= List of airports by ICAO code: N =

List of airports by ICAO code: A - B - C - D - EB-EG - EH-EY - FA-FM - FN-FZ - G - H - ~~I~~ - J - KA-KH - KI-KP - KR-KZ - LA-LJ - LK-LZ - M - N - O - P - Q - R - SA-SC - SD-SH - SI - SJ - SK-SM - SN-SP - SQ - SS-SU - SV-SY - T - U - V - W - ~~X~~ - YA-YG - YH-YQ - YR-YZ - Z

== NC - Cook Islands ==
Also see airport category and list.

ICAO	IATA	Airport name	Community	Coordinates	Notes
NCAI	AIT	Aitutaki Airport (Araura Airport)	Aitutaki (Araura)	18°49′51″S 159°45′51″W	
NCAT	AIU	Enua Airport	Atiu (Enua Manu)	19°58′04″S 158°07′12″W	
NCMG	MGS	Mangaia Airport	Mangaia (Auau Enua)	21°53′45″S 157°54′24″W	
NCMH	MHX	Manihiki Island Airport	Manihiki (Humphrey Island)	10°22′50″S 160°59′59″W	
NCMK	MUK	Mauke Airport	Mauke (Akatoka Manava)	20°08′12″S 157°20′41″W	
NCMN		Manuae Airstrip	Manuae Island	19°16′00″S 158°57′35″W	Closed
NCMR	MOI	Mitiaro Airport (Nukuroa Airport)	Mitiaro (Nukuroa)	19°50′35″S 157°42′12″W	
NCPK	PZK	Pukapuka Island Airport	Pukapuka	10°54′52″S 165°50′20″W	
NCPY	PYE	Tongareva Airport	Penrhyn Island (Tongareva)	09°00′24″S 158°02′12″W	
NCRG	RAR	Rarotonga International Airport	Avarua, Rarotonga	21°12′10″S 159°48′20″W	
NCSW		Suwarrow Airport	Anchorage Island	13°14′41″S 163°06′14″W	Closed

== NF - Fiji and Tonga ==
=== NF - Fiji ===
Also see airport category and list.

ICAO	IATA	Airport name	Community	Coordinates	Notes
NFBC		Beachcomber Island Seaplane Base and Heliport	Beachcomber Island	17°39′13″S 177°15′20″E	
NFCI	ICI	Cicia Airport	Cicia	17°44′35″S 179°20′31″W	
NFCN		Malolo Island Resort Seaplane Base and Heliport	Malolo	17°44′38″S 177°08′49″E	
NFCS	CST	Castaway Island Airport	Castaway Island (Qalito), Mamanuca Islands	17°44′00″S 177°07′37″E	
NFFA	BFJ	Ba Airport	Ba, Viti Levu	17°31′50″S 177°41′25″E	Closed
NFFN	NAN	Nadi International Airport	Nadi, Viti Levu	17°45′19″S 177°26′36″E	
NFFO	PTF	Malolo Lailai Airport	Malolo Lailai	17°46′59″S 177°12′59″E	
NFFR	RBI	Rabi Airport	Rabi	16°32′01″S 179°58′33″E	
NFKB		Kaibu Airport	Kaibu	17°15′15″S 179°29′19″W	
NFKD	KDV	Vunisea Airport	Vunisea (Namalata), Kadavu	19°03′29″S 178°09′25″E	
NFMA	MNF	Mana Island Airport	Mana Island	17°40′23″S 177°05′54″E	
NFMO	MFJ	Moala Airport	Moala	18°34′01″S 179°57′04″E	
NFNA	SUV	Nausori International Airport (Luvuluvu)	Suva, Viti Levu	18°02′36″S 178°33′33″E	
NFNB	LEV	Levuka Airfield	Bureta	17°42′40″S 178°45′31″E	
NFND	PHR	Pacific Harbour/Deuba Seaplane Base	Pacific Harbour / Deuba, Viti Levu	18°15′26″S 178°04′05″E	
NFNG	NGI	Gau Airport	Gau Island	18°06′56″S 179°20′23″E	
NFNH	LUC	Laucala Airport	Laucala (Lauthala Island)	16°44′53″S 179°40′01″W	
NFNK	LKB	Lakeba Airport	Lakeba (Lakemba)	18°11′57″S 178°49′01″W	
NFNL	LBS	Labasa Airport	Labasa (Lambasa), Vanua Levu	16°28′00″S 179°20′23″E	
NFNM	TVU	Matei Airport (Taveuni Island Airport)	Matei, Taveuni	16°41′26″S 179°52′37″W	
NFNO	KXF	Koro Airport	Koro	17°20′45″S 179°25′19″E	
NFNR	RTA	Rotuma Airport	Rotuma	12°28′57″S 177°04′16″E	
NFNS	SVU	Savusavu Airport	Savusavu	16°48′10″S 179°20′26″E	
NFNU	BVF	Dama Airport	Bua, Vanua Levu	16°51′35″S 178°37′23″E	Closed
NFNV	VAU	Vatukoula Airport	Vatukoula, Viti Levu	17°30′00″S 177°51′47″E	
NFNW	KAY	Wakaya Airport	Wakaya	17°37′43″S 179°00′35″E	
NFOL	ONU	Ono-i-Lau Airport	Ono-i-Lau	20°39′32″S 178°44′28″W	
NFRS		Treasure Island Seaplane Base and Heliport	Treasure Island	17°39′18″S 177°15′56″E	
NFSW	YAS	Yasawa Island Airport	Yasawa	16°45′32″S 177°32′44″E	
NFUL		Nanuya Levu Seaplane Base and Heliport	Nanuya Levu	16°57′57″S 177°22′13″E	
NFVB	VBV	Vanuabalavu Airport	Vanua Balavu (Vanuabalavu)	17°14′42″S 178°57′34″W	
NFVL	VTF	Vatulele Airport	Vatulele	18°30′45″S 177°38′20″E	

=== NFT - Tonga ===
Also see airport category and list.

ICAO	IATA	Airport name	Community	Coordinates
NFTE	EUA	ʻEua Airport (Kaufana Airport)	ʻEua	21°22′38″S 174°57′28″W
NFTF	TBU	Fuaʻamotu International Airport	Nukuʻalofa, Tongatapu	21°14′28″S 175°08′58″W
NFTL	HPA	Lifuka Island Airport (Salote Pilolevu Airport)	Lifuka, Ha'apai	19°46′36″S 174°20′28″W
NFTO	NFO	Niuafo'ou Airport (Kuini Lavinia Airport)	Niuafo'ou	15°34′16″S 175°37′51″W
NFTP	NTT	Niuatoputapu Airport (Mata'aho Airport)	Niuatoputapu	15°58′36″S 173°45′18″W
NFTV	VAV	Vava'u International Airport (Lupepau'u Airport)	Vava'u	18°35′07″S 173°57′42″W

== NG - Gilbert and Ellice Islands ==
=== Gilbert Islands (Kiribati) ===
Also see airport category and list.

ICAO	IATA	Airport name	Community	Coordinates
NGAB	ABF	Abaiang Airport	Abaiang	01°47′47″N 173°02′25″E
NGBR	BEZ	Beru Airport	Beru Island	01°21′17″S 176°00′26″E
NGKT	KUC	Kuria Airfield	Kuria	00°13′07″N 173°26′32″E
NGMA	MNK	Maiana Airfield	Maiana	01°00′13″N 173°01′51″E
NGMK	MZK	Marakei Airport	Marakei	02°03′01″N 173°16′00″E
NGMN	MTK	Makin Airport	Makin	03°22′28″N 172°59′32″E
NGNU	NIG	Nikunau Airport	Nikunau	01°18′52″S 176°24′37″E
NGON	OOT	Onotoa Airport	Onotoa	01°47′47″S 175°31′33″E
NGTA	TRW	Bonriki International Airport	Tarawa	01°22′54″N 173°08′49″E
NGTB	AEA	Abemama Airport	Abemama	00°29′27″N 173°49′43″E
NGTE	TBF	Tabiteuea North Airport	Tabiteuea North	01°13′28″S 174°46′32″E
NGTM	TMN	Tamana Airport	Tamana	02°29′09″S 175°58′12″E
NGTO	NON	Nonouti Airport	Nonouti	00°38′23″S 174°25′40″E
NGTR	AIS	Arorae Airport	Arorae	02°36′59″S 176°48′08″E
NGTS	TSU	Tabiteuea South Airport	Tabiteuea South	01°28′28″S 175°03′52″E
NGTU	BBG	Butaritari Airport	Butaritari	03°05′11″N 172°48′41″E
NGUK	AAK	Aranuka Airport	Aranuka	00°11′07″N 173°38′11″E

=== Tuvalu ===
Also see airport category and list.

ICAO	IATA	Airport name	Community	Coordinates
NGFU	FUN	Funafuti International Airport	Funafuti	08°31′30″S 179°11′47″E

== NI - Niue ==
Also see airport category and list.

ICAO	IATA	Airport name	Community	Coordinates
NIUE	IUE	Niue Hanan International Airport	Alofi	19°04′44″S 169°55′33″W

== NL - Wallis and Futuna ==
Also see airport category and list.

ICAO	IATA	Airport name	Community	Coordinates
NLWF	FUT	Pointe Vele Airport (Maopoop Airport)	Futuna Island	14°18′41″S 178°03′58″W
NLWW	WLS	Hihifo Airport	Wallis Island	13°14′18″S 176°11′57″W

== NS - Samoa and American Samoa ==
=== Samoa ===
Also see airport category and list.

ICAO	IATA	Airport name	Community	Coordinates
NSAU	AAU	Asau Airport	Asau	13°30′18″S 172°37′40″W
NSFA	APW	Faleolo International Airport	Apia	13°49′47″S 172°00′30″W
NSFI	FGI	Fagali'i Airport	Fagali'i	13°50′54″S 171°44′30″W
NSMA	MXS	Maota Airport	Salelologa	13°44′32″S 172°15′30″W

=== American Samoa ===
Also see airport category and list.

ICAO	IATA	Airport name	Community	Coordinates
NSAS	OFU	Ofu Airport	Ofu Island	14°11′04″S 169°40′12″W
NSFQ	FAQ	Fitiuta Airport	Fitiuta	14°12′58″S 169°25′25″W
NSTU	PPG	Pago Pago International Airport (Tafuna Airport)	Pago Pago	14°19′41″S 170°42′43″W

== NT - French Polynesia ==
Also see airport category and list.

ICAO	IATA	Airport name	Community	Coordinates	Notes
NTAA	PPT	Faaʻa International Airport	Faʻaʻā, Tahiti	17°33′24″S 149°36′41″W	
NTAR	RUR	Rurutu Airport	Rurutu, Austral Islands	22°25′55″S 151°21′58″W	
NTAT	TUB	Tubuai – Mataura Airport	Tubuai, Austral Islands	23°21′55″S 149°31′27″W	
NTAV	RVV	Raivavae Airport	Raivavae, Austral Islands	23°53′10″S 147°39′55″W	
NTGA	AAA	Anaa Airport	Anaa, Tuamotus	17°21′09″S 145°30′36″W	
NTGB	FGU	Fangatau Airport	Fangatau, Tuamotus	15°49′11″S 140°53′13″W	
NTGC	TIH	Tikehau Airport	Tikehau, Tuamotus	15°07′11″S 148°14′01″W	
NTGD	APK	Apataki Airport	Apataki, Tuamotus	15°34′25″S 146°24′54″W	
NTGE	REA	Reao Airport	Reao, Tuamotus	18°27′48″S 136°26′35″W	
NTGF	FAV	Fakarava Airport	Fakarava, Tuamotus	16°03′15″S 145°39′25″W	
NTGG	FAV	Nengonengo Airstrip	Nengonengo, Tuamotus	18°45′02″S 141°45′31″W	
NTGH	HHZ	Hikueru Airport	Hikueru, Tuamotus	17°32′52″S 142°36′46″W	
NTGI	XMH	Manihi Airport	Manihi, Tuamotus	14°26′15″S 146°04′15″W	
NTGJ	GMR	Totegegie Airport	Totegegie, Gambier Islands	23°05′04″S 134°53′07″W	Nearest to the Pitcairn Islands
NTGK	KKR	Kaukura Airport	Kaukura Atoll	15°39′53″S 146°53′07″W	
NTGM	MKP	Makemo Airport	Makemo, Tuamotus	16°35′12″S 143°39′14″W	
NTGN	NAU	Napuka Airport	Napuka, Disappointment Islands	14°10′36″S 141°16′01″W	
NTGO	TKV	Tatakoto Airport	Tatakoto	17°21′19″S 138°26′42″W	
NTGP	PKP	Puka-Puka Airport	Puka-Puka, Tuamotus	14°48′34″S 138°48′39″W	
NTGQ	PUK	Pukarua Airport	Pukarua, Tuamotus	18°17′44″S 137°01′01″W	
NTGR		Aratika-Perles Airport	Aratika	15°37′22″S 145°29′48″W	
NTGT	TKP	Takapoto Airport	Takapoto, Tuamotus	14°42′36″S 145°14′52″W	
NTGU	AXR	Arutua Airport	Arutua	15°14′47″S 146°37′13″W	
NTGV	MVT	Mataiva Airport	Mataiva, Tuamotus	14°52′12″S 148°42′40″W	
NTGW	NUK	Nukutavake Airport	Nukutavake	19°17′06″S 138°46′19″W	
NTGY	ZTA	Tureia Airport	Tureia (Papahena)	20°46′51″S 138°34′02″W	
NTHE	AHE	Ahe Airport	Ahe	14°25′41″S 146°15′25″W	
NTKA	KHZ	Kauehi Aerodrome	Kauehi (Putake)	14°25′41″S 146°15′25″W	
NTKF	FAC	Faaite Airport	Faaite (Faaiti)	16°41′13″S 145°19′58″W	
NTKH	FHZ	Faahina Airport	Fakahina	15°59′31″S 140°09′53″W	
NTKK	RKA	Aratika Airport	Fakarava	15°29′08″S 145°27′53″W	
NTKM	TJN	Takume Airport	Takume	15°51′17″S 142°16′04″W	
NTKN	NIU	Niau Airport	Niau	16°07′10″S 146°22′11″W	
NTKO	RRR	Raroia Airport	Raroia	16°02′49″S 142°28′37″W	
NTKR	TKX	Takaroa Airport	Takaroa	14°27′22″S 145°01′35″W	
NTKT	KXU	Katiu Airport	Katiu	16°20′22″S 144°24′11″W	
NTKU	NKP	Nukutepipi Airport	Nukutepipi	20°42′06″S 143°02′51″W	
NTMD	NHV	Nuku Hiva Airport	Nuku Hiva, Marquesas Islands	08°47′44″S 140°13′43″W	
NTMN	AUQ	Atuona Airport	Hiva Oa, Marquesas Islands	09°46′07″S 139°00′40″W	
NTMP	UAP	Ua Pou Airport	Ua Pou, Marquesas Islands	09°21′06″S 140°04′40″W	
NTMU	UAH	Ua Huka Airport	Ua Huka, Marquesas Islands	08°56′07″S 139°33′18″W	
NTTB	BOB	Bora Bora Airport (Motu-Mute Airport)	Bora Bora, located on Moto Mute	16°26′37″S 151°45′09″W	
NTTE	TTI	Tetiꞌaroa Airstrip	Tetiꞌaroa, Society Islands	17°00′48″S 149°35′13″W	
NTTG	RGI	Rangiroa Airport	Rangiroa, Tuamotus	14°57′23″S 147°39′33″W	
NTTH	HUH	Huahine - Fare Airport	Huahine, Leeward Islands (Society Islands)	16°41′14″S 151°01′18″W	
NTTM	MOZ	Moorea Airport	Moorea, Windward Islands (Society Islands)	17°29′22″S 149°45′44″W	
NTTO	HOI	Hao Airport	Hao Island	18°04′29″S 140°56′45″W	
NTTP	MAU	Maupiti Airport	Maupiti	16°25′35″S 152°14′36″W	
NTTR	RFP	Raiatea Airport (Uturoa Airport)	Raiatea, Society Islands	16°43′24″S 151°28′01″W	
NTTX	UOA	Mururoa Airstrip	Mururoa	21°48′34″S 138°48′47″W	
NTUV	VHZ	Vahitahi Airport	Vahitahi	18°46′48″S 138°51′11″W	

== NV - Vanuatu ==
Also see airport category and list.

ICAO	IATA	Airport name	Community	Coordinates	Notes
NVSA	MTV	Mota Lava Airport (Valua Airport)	Mota Lava	13°39′57″S 167°42′40″E	
NVSC	SLH	Vanua Lava Airport	Sola	13°51′06″S 167°32′13″E	
NVSD	TOH	Torres Airport	Linua	13°19′39″S 166°38′18″E	
NVSE	EAE	Siwo Airport (Aromai Airport)	Émaé	17°05′25″S 168°20′34″E	
NVSF	CCV	Craig Cove Airport	Craig Cove, Ambrym	16°15′54″S 167°55′28″E	
NVSG	LOD	Longana Airport	Longana	15°18′24″S 167°58′02″E	
NVSH	SSR	Sara Airport	Sara	15°28′15″S 168°09′08″E	
NVSI	PBJ	Paama Airport	Paama	16°25′55″S 168°14′08″E	
NVSL	LPM	Malekoula Airport	Lamap	16°27′14″S 167°49′23″E	
NVSM	LNB	Lamen Bay Airport	Lamen Bay, Epi	16°35′03″S 168°09′33″E	
NVSN	MWF	Maewo-Naone Airport	Maewo	14°59′50″S 168°04′52″E	
NVSO	LNE	Lonorore Airport	Lonorore	15°51′56″S 168°10′19″E	
NVSP	NUS	Norsup Airport	Norsup	16°04′47″S 167°24′02″E	
NVSQ	ZGU	Gaua Airport	Gaua	14°13′05″S 167°35′14″E	
NVSR	RCL	Redcliff Airport	Redcliff	15°28′17″S 167°50′05″E	
NVSS	SON	Santo-Pekoa International Airport	Luganville, Espiritu Santo	15°30′21″S 167°13′17″E	
NVST	TGH	Tongoa Airport	Tongoa	16°53′28″S 168°33′04″E	
NVSU	ULB	Ulei Airport	Ulei, Ambrym	16°19′47″S 168°18′03″E	
NVSV	VLS	Valesdir Airport	Valesdir, Epi	16°47′46″S 168°10′37″E	
NVSW	WLH	Walaha Airport	Walaha, Ambae	15°24′43″S 167°41′28″E	
NVSX	SWJ	South West Bay Airport	South West Bay, Malakula	16°29′02″S 167°26′44″E	
NVSZ	OLJ	Olpoi Airport	Olpoi, Espiritu Santo	14°52′54″S 166°33′29″E	
NVVA	AUY	Anatom Airport (Aneityum Airport)	Aneityum	20°14′57″S 169°46′17″E	
NVVB	AWD	Aniwa Airport	Aniwa	19°14′04″S 169°36′02″E	
NVVD	DLY	Dillon's Bay Airport	Dillon's Bay, Erromango	18°46′10″S 169°00′05″E	
NVVF	FTA	Futuna Airport	Futuna	19°30′59″S 170°13′55″E	
NVVI	IPA	Ipota Airport	Ipota	18°51′23″S 169°17′00″E	
NVVJ		Forari Airport	Forari	17°42′04″S 168°31′38″E	
NVVK		Lenakel Airport	Lenakel	19°30′57″S 169°15′44″E	Closed
NVVQ	UIQ	Quoin Hill Airport	Quoin Hill	17°32′24″S 168°26′31″E	Closed
NVVV	VLI	Bauerfield International Airport	Port Vila	17°41′57″S 168°19′11″E	
NVVW	TAH	Whitegrass Airport	Tanna	19°27′18″S 169°13′26″E	

== NW - New Caledonia ==
Also see airport category and list.

ICAO	IATA	Airport name	Community	Coordinates	Notes
NWWA	TGJ	Tiga Airport	Tiga Island	21°05′45″S 167°48′14″E	
NWWB		Bourail - Poe Airport	Bourail	21°36′35″S 165°23′50″E	
NWWC	BMY	Île Art - Waala Airport (Belep Islands Airport)	Waala, Belep	19°43′14″S 163°39′40″E	
NWWD	KNQ	Koné Airport	Koné	21°03′12″S 164°50′16″E	
NWWE	ILP	Île des Pins Airport	L'Île-des-Pins	22°35′20″S 167°27′21″E	
NWWF		Voh Airport	Voh	20°58′01″S 164°42′00″E	Closed
NWWH	HLU	Nesson Airport	Houailou	21°15′23″S 165°37′03″E	
NWWI	HNG	Hienghène Airport	Hienghène	20°41′40″S 164°59′33″E	Closed
NWWK	KOC	Koumac Airport	Koumac	20°32′33″S 164°15′34″E	
NWWL	LIF	Ouanaham Airport (Wanaham Airport)	Lifou	20°46′30″S 167°14′25″E	
NWWM	GEA	Nouméa Magenta Airport	Nouméa	22°15′30″S 166°28′22″E	
NWWO	IOU	Ile Ouen/Edmond Cane Airport	Ile Ouen	22°27′36″S 166°46′57″E	
NWWP	PUV	Malabou Airport	Poum	20°17′21″S 164°05′58″E	
NWWQ	PDC	Mueo/Nickel Airport	Nepoui	21°18′59″S 164°59′58″E	
NWWR	MEE	Maré Airport	Maré	21°28′54″S 168°02′15″E	
NWWS		Plaine des Lacs Airport	Yaté	22°16′13″S 166°55′32″E	Closed
NWWT		La Foa - Oua Tom Airport	La Foa	21°49′11″S 165°51′40″E	
NWWU	TOU	Touho Airport	Touho	20°47′24″S 165°15′34″E	
NWWV	UVE	Ouvéa Airport	Ouvéa	20°38′26″S 166°34′22″E	
NWWW	NOU	La Tontouta International Airport	Nouméa	22°00′59″S 166°12′58″E	
NWWX		Canala Airport	Canala	21°31′13″S 165°58′19″E	

== NZ - New Zealand ==
Also see airport category and list.

ICAO	IATA	Airport name	Community	Coordinates	Notes
NZAA	AKL	Auckland Airport	Auckland	37°00′29″S 174°47′30″E	
NZAH		Taharoa Ironsands Heliport	Taharoa	38°10′15″S 174°42′16″E	
NZAM		Ashburton Medical Centre Heliport	Ashburton	43°53′39″S 171°44′53″E	
NZAN		Anama Airport	Anama	43°47′37″S 171°23′38″E	
NZAP	TUO	Taupo Airport	Taupo	38°44′23″S 176°05′04″E	
NZAR	AMZ	Ardmore Airport	Auckland	37°01′47″S 174°58′24″E	
NZAS	ASG	Ashburton Aerodrome	Ashburton	43°54′12″S 171°47′48″E	
NZAW		Auckland Harbour Water Aerodrome	Auckland	36°50′02″S 174°45′49″E	
NZBA		Balclutha Aerodrome	Balclutha	46°14′36″S 169°45′00″E	
NZBG		Bulls Gorge Heliport	Kerikeri	35°16′17″S 173°56′30″E	
NZBW		Burwood Hospital Heliport	Christchurch	43°28′47″S 172°41′13″E	
NZCB		Centre Bush Airfield	Winton	46°02′24″S 168°18′42″E	
NZCG		Centennial Park Airfield	Taupō	38°39′55″S 176°08′05″E	
NZCH	CHC	Christchurch Airport	Christchurch	43°29′22″S 172°32′04″E	
NZCI	CHT	Chatham Islands / Tuuta Airport	Chatham Islands	43°48′50″S 176°28′24″W	
NZCL		Cloudy Bay Airfield	Spring Creek	41°27′22″S 174°00′51″E	
NZCS		Cromwell Racecourse Aerodrome	Cromwell	45°02′55″S 169°10′14″E	
NZCV		Cheviot Heliport	Cheviot	42°48′32″S 173°15′56″E	
NZCW		Cromwell Airfield	Cromwell	44°58′48″S 169°13′06″E	
NZCX	CMV	Coromandel Aerodrome	Coromandel Peninsula, North Island	36°47′30″S 175°30′31″E	
NZDA	DGR	Dargaville Aerodrome	Dargaville	35°56′23″S 173°53′37″E	
NZDC		Dunedin City Heliport	Dunedin	45°53′00″S 170°30′30″E	
NZDH		Dunedin Hospital Heliport	Dunedin	45°52′07″S 170°30′34″E	
NZDN	DUD	Dunedin International Airport	Mosgiel, Dunedin	45°55′41″S 170°11′54″E	
NZDU		Dunstan Hospital Heliport	Clyde	45°12′03″S 169°19′54″E	
NZDV		Dannevirke Aerodrome	Dannevirke	40°13′42″S 176°04′43″E	
NZDY		Drury Airfield	Drury	37°05′47″N 174°58′31″E	
NZES		Wharepapa South Airfield	Wharepapa South	38°08′38″S 175°33′01″E	
NZEV		Eves Valley Heliport	Brightwater	41°20′23″S 173°04′39″E	
NZFA		Te Hapua Emergency Heliport	Te Hāpua	34°30′59″S 172°54′41″E	
NZFE		Fernside Fields Airpark	Fernside	43°19′03″S 172°30′42″E	
NZFF		Forest Field Aerodrome	Rangiora	43°23′09″S 172°30′42″E	
NZFG		Fern Gully Heliport	Oban	46°53′42″S 168°06′42″E	
NZFH		Fox Heliport	Fox Glacier	43°28′19″S 170°00′14″E	
NZFI		Feilding Aerodrome	Feilding	40°15′21″S 175°36′21″E	
NZFJ	WHO	Franz Josef Aerodrome	Franz Josef	43°21′47″S 170°08′04″E	
NZFO	FGL	Fox Glacier Aerodrome	Fox Glacier	43°27′43″S 170°01′08″E	
NZFP		Foxpine Aerodrome	Foxton	40°27′24″S 175°16′13″E	
NZFR		Fox River Heliport	Fox Glacier	43°28′07″S 170°00′07″E	
NZFT		Flat Point Aerodrome	Flat Point	41°14′35″S 175°57′37″E	
NZGA		Galatea Aerodrome	Galatea	38°24′31″S 176°44′31″E	
NZGB	GBZ	Great Barrier Aerodrome	Great Barrier Island	36°14′29″S 175°28′19″E	
NZGC		Gore Aerodrome (Charlton Aerodrome)	Gore	46°09′24″S 168°53′54″E	
NZGD		Geraldine Domain Heliport	Geraldine	44°05′49″S 171°14′34″E	
NZGH		Glacier Country Heliport	Franz Josef / Waiau	43°23′14″S 170°10′48″E	
NZGM	GMN	Greymouth Airport	Greymouth	42°27′42″S 171°11′24″E	
NZGO		Gore Hospital Heliport	Gore	46°06′10″S 168°56′19″E	
NZGS	GIS	Gisborne Airport	Gisborne	38°39′48″S 177°58′42″E	
NZGT	GTN	Glentanner Aerodrome	Lake Pukaki	43°54′28″S 170°07′44″E	
NZGY		Glenorchy Aerodrome	Glenorchy	44°52′18″S 168°23′51″E	
NZHA		Hawera Aerodrome	Hāwera	39°33′12″S 174°16′01″E	
NZHB		Helena Bay Heliport	Teal Bay	35°25′23″S 174°21′47″E	
NZHC		Wanaka Lakes Health Centre Heliport	Wānaka	44°42′34″S 169°08′11″E	
NZHF		Huka Falls Heliport	Wairakei Village	38°38′36″S 176°05′18″E	
NZHH		Waikato Hospital Heliport	Hamilton	37°48′23″S 175°16′51″E	
NZHK	HKK	Hokitika Airport	Hokitika	42°42′49″S 170°59′07″E	
NZHM		Hanmer Springs Aerodrome	Hanmer Springs	42°34′11″S 172°47′53″E	
NZHN	HLZ	Hamilton Airport	Hamilton	37°51′59″S 175°20′07″E	
NZHP		Lake Haupiri Airport	Gloriavale Christian Community	42°36′04″S 171°41′57″E	
NZHR		Hanmer Medical Centre Heliport	Hanmer Springs	42°31′13″S 172°49′23″E	
NZHS		Hastings Aerodrome	Hastings	39°38′48″S 176°46′01″E	
NZHT		Haast Aerodrome	Haast	43°52′00″S 169°02′25″E	
NZJA		Tauranga Hospital Heliport	Tauranga	37°42′25″S 176°08′53″E	
NZJB		Wairau Hospital Heliport	Blenheim	41°32′12″S 173°56′37″E	
NZJC		Christchurch Hospital Heliport	Christchurch	43°31′59″S 172°37′26″E	
NZJD		Thames Hospital Heliport	Thames	37°08′09″S 175°32′40″E	
NZJE		Dargaville Hospital Heliport	Dargaville	35°55′44″S 173°52′32″E	
NZJF		Whakatane Hospital Heliport	Whakatāne	37°57′56″S 176°58′36″E	
NZJG		Gisborne Hospital Heliport	Gisborne	38°38′19″S 178°00′13″E	
NZJH		Hastings Hospital Heliport	Hastings	39°37′48″S 176°49′26″E	
NZJI		Bay of Islands Heliport	Kerikeri	35°23′13″S 174°04′10″E	
NZJJ		Christchurch Hospital Hagley Heliport	Christchurch	43°32′13″S 172°37′16″E	
NZJK		Kaitaia Hospital Heliport	Kaitaia	35°07′06″S 173°15′39″E	
NZJL		Auckland Hospital Heliport	Auckland	36°51′33″S 174°46′08″E	
NZJM		Palmerston North Hospital Heliport	Palmerston North	40°20′16″S 175°37′10″E	
NZJN		North Shore Hospital Heliport	Takapuna	36°46′54″S 174°45′31″E	
NZJO		Rotorua Hospital Heliport	Rotorua	38°07′55″S 176°14′48″E	
NZJP		Te Puia Springs Hospital Heliport	Te Puia Springs	38°03′17″S 178°18′16″E	
NZJQ		Taranaki Base Hospital Heliport	New Plymouth	39°04′13″S 174°03′18″E	
NZJR		Whangarei Hospital Heliport	Whangarei	35°44′05″S 174°18′11″E	
NZJS		Southland/Kew Hospital Heliport	Invercargill	46°26′14″S 168°21′34″E	
NZJT		Taumarunui Hospital Heliport	Taumarunui	38°53′23″S 175°15′05″E	
NZJU		Wanganui Hospital Heliport	Whanganui	39°56′36″S 175°02′21″E	
NZJW		Rawene Hospital Heliport	Rawene	35°24′26″N 173°30′23″E	
NZJX		Tokoroa Hospital Heliport	Tokoroa	38°13′55″S 175°51′39″E	
NZJY		Wairoa Hospital Heliport	Wairoa	39°02′33″S 177°24′51″E	
NZJZ		Taupo Hospital Heliport	Taupo	38°41′55″S 176°05′56″E	
NZKC		Kaikoura Medical Centre Heliport	Kaikōura	42°24′16″S 173°40′51″E	
NZKD		Motu Kaikoura Island Aerodrome	Kaikōura Island	36°10′41″S 175°19′28″E	
NZKE	WIK	Waiheke Island Aerodrome	Waiheke Island	36°48′30″S 175°05′07″E	
NZKF		Kaipara Flats Aerodrome	Kaipara Flats	36°24′23″S 174°35′14″E	
NZKH		Kenepuru Hospital Heliport	Kenepuru	41°08′42″S 174°50′05″E	
NZKI	KBZ	Kaikoura Aerodrome	Kaikoura	42°25′30″S 173°36′19″E	
NZKJ		Kaikoura Beachfront Heliport	Kaikōura	42°23′42″S 173°40′51″E	
NZKK	KKE	Kerikeri/Bay of Islands Airport	Kerikeri / Bay of Islands	35°15′46″S 173°54′43″E	
NZKM		Karamea Aerodrome	Karamea	41°14′17″S 172°06′22″E	
NZKN		Kensington Park Heliport	Kensington	35°42′17″S 174°18′46″E	
NZKO	KKO	Kaikohe Aerodrome	Kaikohe	35°27′04″S 173°49′02″E	
NZKP		Koputaroa Airstrip	Koputaroa	40°33′34″S 175°19′59″E	
NZKT	KAT	Kaitaia Airport	Kaitaia	35°04′12″S 173°17′07″E	
NZKY		Kowhai Airfield	Tikokino	39°50′43″S 176°25′17″E	
NZLA		Loburn Abbey Airfield	Fernside	43°14′01″S 172°29′39″E	
NZLE		Lake Station Airport	Saint Arnaud	41°45′33″S 172°44′45″E	
NZLF		Rotorua Lakefront Heliport	Rotorua	38°07′46″S 176°15′10″E	
NZLM		Lumsden Medical Centre Heliport	Lumsden	45°44′28″S 168°26′32″E	
NZLT		Taupo Water Aerodrome	Taupō	38°43′54″S 176°02′06″E	
NZLX	ALR	Alexandra Aerodrome	Alexandra	45°12′42″S 169°22′24″E	
NZMA	MTA	Matamata Airport	Matamata	37°44′04″S 175°44′31″E	
NZMB		Mechanics Bay Heliport	Auckland	36°50′48″S 174°47′19″E	
NZMC	MON	Mount Cook Aerodrome	Aoraki / Mount Cook	43°45′54″S 170°08′00″E	
NZME		Mercer Airfield	Mercer	37°15′33″S 175°06′53″E	
NZMF	MFN	Milford Sound Airport	Milford Sound	44°40′24″S 167°55′24″E	
NZMG		Mangonui Heliport	Taipā	34°59′44″S 173°27′52″E	
NZMH		Masterton Hospital Heliport	Masterton	40°56′51″S 175°40′31″E	
NZMJ		Martins Bay Aerodrome	Fiordland Community	44°21′49″S 168°01′09″E	
NZMK	MZP	Motueka Aerodrome	Motueka	41°07′24″S 172°59′19″E	
NZML		Mid Waiho Loop Airfield	Franz Josef / Waiau	43°21′13″S 170°11′27″E	
NZMM		Middlemore Hospital Heliport	Middlemore	36°57′48″S 174°50′43″E	
NZMO	TEU	Te Anau Airport	Te Anau / Manapouri	45°31′59″S 167°39′00″E	
NZMR		Murchison Aerodrome	Murchison	41°47′48″S 172°18′54″E	
NZMS	MRO	Hood Aerodrome	Masterton	40°58′24″S 175°38′01″E	
NZMV		Methven Heliport	Methven	43°38′05″N 171°39′16″E	
NZMW		Makarora Aerodrome	Makarora	44°13′54″S 169°13′49″E	
NZNE		North Shore Aerodrome (Dairy Flat Airstrip)	Dairy Flat, Auckland	36°39′24″S 174°39′19″E	
NZNF		Norfolk Aerodrome	Inglewood	39°12′16″S 174°13′24″E	
NZNH		Nelson Hospital Heliport	Nelson	41°17′18″S 173°16′20″E	
NZNP	NPL	New Plymouth Airport	New Plymouth	39°00′31″S 174°10′45″E	
NZNR	NPE	Hawke's Bay Airport	Napier	39°27′57″S 176°52′12″E	
NZNS	NSN	Nelson Airport	Nelson	41°17′54″S 173°13′16″E	
NZNV	IVC	Invercargill Airport	Invercargill	46°24′54″S 168°19′12″E	
NZOA		Omarama Airfield	Omarama	44°29′12″S 169°59′10″E	
NZOB		Ocean Beach Heliport	Ocean Beach	46°35′23″S 168°18′20″E	
NZOF		Omaha Flats Airfield	Ōmaha	36°20′46″S 174°45′37″E	
NZOG		Makarora Heliport	Makarora	44°13′59″S 169°13′48″E	
NZOH	OHA	Ohakea Airbase (RNZAF)	Ohakea	40°12′24″S 175°23′13″E	
NZOI		Ongaio Island Aerodrome	Collingwood	40°40′25″S 172°39′52″E	Closed
NZOM		Omaka Aerodrome	Blenheim	41°32′24″S 173°55′19″E	
NZON		Oban Heliport	Oban	46°54′02″S 168°07′28″E	
NZOP		Opotiki Aerodrome	Opotiki	38°01′21″S 177°18′26″E	
NZOR		Oamaru Hospital Heliport	Oamaru	45°05′58″S 170°58′01″E	
NZOS		Otehei Bay Heliport	Urupukapuka Island	35°13′22″S 174°13′48″E	Heliport is on tethered barge
NZOT		Otaki Airstrip	Ōtaki	40°47′01″S 175°09′04″E	
NZOU	OAM	Oamaru Airport	Oamaru	44°58′12″S 171°04′54″E	
NZOW		Onetangi Emergency Heliport	Onetangi	36°48′18″S 175°04′15″E	
NZOX		Okiwi Airfield	Okiwi, Great Barrier Island	36°08′47″S 175°23′13″E	
NZPA		Paihia Heliport	Paihia	35°16′56″S 174°05′29″E	
NZPH		Pudding Hill Airfield	Methven	43°35′14″S 171°31′40″E	
NZPI		West Auckland Airport	Parakai	36°39′06″S 174°26′00″E	
NZPK		Pikes Point Heliport	Southdown	36°55′49″S 174°48′47″E	
NZPM	PMR	Palmerston North International Airport	Palmerston North	40°19′14″S 175°37′10″E	
NZPN	PCN	Picton Aerodrome	Picton - Koromiko	41°20′54″S 173°57′19″E	
NZPO		Porangahau Aerodrome	Pōrangahau	40°16′51″S 176°39′09″E	
NZPP	PPQ	Kapiti Coast Airport	Paraparaumu	40°54′17″S 174°59′21″E	
NZPS		Paihia Waterfront Heliport	Paihia	35°16′55″S 174°05′35″E	
NZPU		Pukekohe Aerodrome	Tuakau	37°15′34″S 174°54′27″E	Closed
NZPW		Papawai Airfield	Pāpāwai	41°06′15″S 175°30′00″E	
NZQN	ZQN	Queenstown Airport	Queenstown	45°01′16″S 168°44′21″E	
NZQW		Queens Wharf Heliport	Wellington	41°17′09″S 174°46′48″E	
NZRA	RAG	Raglan Airfield	Raglan	37°48′17″S 174°51′36″E	
NZRC	SZS	Ryan's Creek Aerodrome	Halfmoon Bay, Stewart Island	46°53′59″S 168°06′07″E	
NZRD		Rosedale Heliport	Rosedale	36°44′33″S 174°42′57″E	
NZRI		Rangitata Island Aerodrome	Rangitata Island	44°05′06″S 171°24′57″E	
NZRK		Rangitaiki Aerodrome	Rangitaiki	38°53′12″S 176°21′49″E	
NZRL		Rotorua Lakes Water Aerodrome	Rotorua	38°06′48″S 176°16′35″E	
NZRN		Ranfurly Medical Centre Heliport	Ranfurly	45°07′47″S 170°06′38″E	
NZRO	ROT	Rotorua Airport	Rotorua	38°06′17″S 176°19′02″E	
NZRR		Ruatoria Aerodrome	Ruatoria	37°53′02″S 178°17′24″E	
NZRT		Rangiora Airfield	Rangiora	43°17′24″S 172°32′30″E	
NZRW		Ruawai Airfield	Ruawai	36°05′45″S 173°58′31″E	
NZRX		Roxburgh Aerodrome	Roxburgh	45°30′42″S 169°19′00″E	
NZSD		Stratford Aerodrome	Stratford	39°19′08″S 174°18′37″E	
NZSF		Springfield Aerodrome	Springfield	43°23′01″S 171°54′40″E	
NZSL		Springhill Airport	Wellsford	36°19′30″S 174°33′20″E	
NZSO		Marlborough Sounds Seaplane Base	Picton	41°15′20″S 174°01′18″E	
NZTC		Tapanui Medical Centre Heliport	Tapanui	45°56′17″S 169°15′48″E	
NZTE		Te Kowhai Aerodrome	Te Kowhai	37°44′42″S 175°09′31″E	
NZTG	TRG	Tauranga Airport	Tauranga	37°40′19″S 176°11′46″E	
NZTH	TMZ	Thames Aerodrome	Thames	37°09′24″S 175°33′01″E	
NZTI		Taieri Aerodrome	Dunedin	45°51′36″S 170°21′30″E	
NZTJ		Tāwhaki National Aerospace Centre	Christchurch	43°49′52″S 172°32′17″E	
NZTK	KTF	Takaka Aerodrome	Takaka	40°48′48″S 172°46′33″E	
NZTL		Lake Tekapo Airport	Tekapo	44°00′18″S 170°26′30″E	
NZTM		Taumarunui Aerodrome	Taumarunui	38°50′36″S 175°15′19″E	
NZTN		Turangi Airport	Turangi	38°58′06″S 175°48′49″E	
NZTO	TKZ	Tokoroa Aerodrome	Tokoroa	38°14′12″S 175°53′34″E	
NZTP		Tekapo MacKenzie Heliport	Lake Tekapo	44°00′46″S 170°24′24″E	
NZTQ		Te Kuiti Hospital Heliport	Te Kūiti	38°20′02″S 175°09′06″E	
NZTR		Te Araroa Airstrip	Te Araroa	37°37′45″S 178°20′51″E	
NZTS		Tasman Heliport	Tasman	41°12′16″S 173°02′58″E	
NZTT		Te Kuiti Airfield	Te Kuiti	38°18′12″S 175°08′49″E	
NZTU	TIU	Richard Pearse Airport	Timaru	44°18′10″S 171°13′31″E	
NZTW		Twizel Medical Centre Heliport	Twizel	44°15′40″S 170°05′52″E	
NZTX		Te Anau Medical Centre Heliport	Te Anau	45°24′58″S 167°43′12″E	
NZTZ		Timaru Hospital Heliport	Timaru	44°24′33″S 171°15′20″E	
NZUK	TWZ	Pukaki Aerodrome	Twizel	44°14′06″S 170°07′06″E	
NZUN		Pauanui Aerodrome	Pauanui	37°01′18″S 175°51′49″E	
NZUR		Murchison Hospital Heliport	Murchison	41°48′23″S 172°19′43″E	
NZVL		Mandeville Aerodrome	Mandeville, Gore	45°59′25″S 168°48′44″E	
NZVR		Taihape Airport	Taihape	39°41′06″S 175°47′19″E	
NZWB	BHE	Woodbourne Airport	Blenheim	41°31′06″S 173°52′13″E	ICAO code also listed as NZBM
NZWE		Kauaroa Bay Heliport	Ōmiha	36°49′47″S 175°03′56″E	
NZWF	WKA	Wanaka Airport	Wanaka	44°43′20″S 169°14′44″E	
NZWG		Whangamata Heliport	Whangamatā	37°12′02″S 175°52′00″E	
NZWH		Wellington Hospital Heliport	Wellington	41°18′30″S 174°46′46″E	
NZWJ		Wellsford Heliport	Wellsford	36°17′51″S 174°31′23″E	
NZWK	WHK	Whakatane Airport	Whakatane	37°55′13″S 176°54′48″E	
NZWL	WML	West Melton Aerodrome	West Melton	43°28′36″S 172°23′48″E	
NZWM		Waimate Aerodrome	Waimate	44°47′24″S 171°05′30″E	
NZWN	WLG	Wellington International Airport	Wellington	41°19′38″S 174°48′19″E	
NZWO	WIR	Wairoa Aerodrome	Wairoa	39°00′55″S 177°24′51″E	
NZWP		RNZAF Base Auckland	Auckland	36°47′15″S 174°37′48″E	
NZWQ		Waitiki Airstrip	Waitiki Landing	34°31′37″S 172°50′18″E	Not open to the public
NZWR	WRE	Whangarei Airport	Whangarei	35°46′06″S 174°21′54″E	
NZWS	WSZ	Westport Airport	Westport	41°44′17″S 171°34′51″E	
NZWT	WTZ	Whitianga Aerodrome	Whitianga	36°49′54″S 175°40′43″E	
NZWU	WAG	Whanganui Airport	Whanganui	39°57′44″S 175°01′31″E	
NZWV		Waihi Beach Aerodrome	Waihi Beach	37°25′48″S 175°57′07″E	
NZWZ		Warkworth Heliport	Warkworth	36°23′52″S 174°39′31″E	
NZYP		Waipukurau Aerodrome	Waipukurau	39°59′48″S 176°32′13″E	
