= List of airports in New Zealand =

This is a list of airports in New Zealand.

== List ==
Locations displayed in bold have international airports. Airport names in bold indicate that it has scheduled passenger service on a commercial airline.

Location	ICAO	IATA	Airport name	Island	Coordinates	Elevation	Longest runway
Alexandra	NZLX	ALR	Alexandra Aerodrome	South	45°12′42″S 169°22′24″E	229 m (752 ft)	1,200 m (3,937 ft)
Ashburton	NZAS	ASG	Ashburton Aerodrome	South	43°54′12″S 171°47′48″E	91 m (298 ft)	1,388 m (4,554 ft)
Auckland (Ardmore)	NZAR	AMZ	Ardmore Airport	North	37°01′47″S 174°58′24″E	34 m (111 ft)	1,411 m (4,629 ft)
Auckland (Dairy Flat)	NZNE		**North Shore Aerodrome**	North	36°39′24″S 174°39′19″E	65 m (212 ft)	811 m (2,661 ft)
**Auckland** (Māngere)	NZAA	AKL	**Auckland Airport**	North	37°00′29″S 174°47′30″E	7 m (23 ft)	3,535 m (11,598 ft)
Auckland (Whenuapai)	NZWP		RNZAF Base Auckland	North	36°47′15″S 174°37′48″E	31 m (103 ft)	2,031 m (6,663 ft)
Balclutha	NZBA		Balclutha Aerodrome	South	46°14′36″S 169°45′00″E	7 m (22 ft)	666 m (2,185 ft)
Blenheim (Omaka)	NZOM	BHE	Omaka Aerodrome	South	41°32′24″S 173°55′19″E	30 m (100 ft)	1,003 m (3,291 ft)
Blenheim (Woodbourne)	NZWB	BHE	**Woodbourne Airport**	South	41°31′06″S 173°52′13″E	33 m (109 ft)	1,425 m (4,675 ft)
Chatham Islands	NZCI	CHT	**Chatham Islands / Tuuta Airport**	Chatham	43°48′50″S 176°28′24″W	12 m (39 ft)	1,850 m (6,070 ft)
**Christchurch**	NZCH	CHC	**Christchurch Airport**	South	43°29′22″S 172°32′04″E	37 m (123 ft)	3,288 m (10,787 ft)
Coromandel	NZCX	CMV	Coromandel Aerodrome	North	36°47′30″S 175°30′31″E	4 m (13 ft)	623 m (2,044 ft)
Cromwell	NZCS		Cromwell Racecourse Aerodrome	South	45°02′55″S 169°10′14″E	227 m (745 ft)	1,020 m (3,346 ft)
Dannevirke	NZDV		Dannevirke Aerodrome	North	40°13′42″S 176°04′43″E	194 m (635 ft)	1,200 m (3,937 ft)
Dargaville	NZDA	DGR	Dargaville Aerodrome	North	35°56′23″S 173°53′37″E	2 m (6 ft)	1,000 m (3,281 ft)
Dunedin (Mosgiel)	NZTI		Taieri Aerodrome	South	45°51′36″S 170°21′30″E	26 m (85 ft)	853 m (2,799 ft)
**Dunedin** (Momona)	NZDN	DUD	**Dunedin Airport**	South	45°55′41″S 170°11′54″E	1 m (4 ft)	1,900 m (6,234 ft)
Eyrewell Forest	NZFF		Forest Field Aerodrome	South	43°23′09″S 172°30′42″E	123 m (402 ft)	1,000 m (3,281 ft)
Feilding	NZFI		Feilding Aerodrome	North	40°15′21″S 175°36′21″E	65 m (214 ft)	1,030 m (3,379 ft)
Fox Glacier	NZFO	FGL	Fox Glacier Aerodrome	South	43°27′43″S 170°01′08″E	174 m (570 ft)	639 m (2,096 ft)
Foxton	NZFP		Foxpine Aerodrome	North	40°27′24″S 175°16′13″E	11 m (36 ft)	1,015 m (3,330 ft)
Franz Josef	NZFJ		Franz Josef Aerodrome	South	43°21′47″S 170°08′04″E	93 m (305 ft)	870 m (2,854 ft)
Galatea / Murupara	NZGA		Galatea Aerodrome	North	38°24′31″S 176°44′31″E	168 m (550 ft)	1,025 m (3,363 ft)
Gisborne	NZGS	GIS	**Gisborne Airport**	North	38°39′48″S 177°58′42″E	5 m (15 ft)	1,310 m (4,298 ft)
Glenorchy	NZGY		Glenorchy Aerodrome	South	44°52′18″S 168°23′51″E	383 m (1,255 ft)	675 m (2,215 ft)
Glentanner / Lake Pukaki	NZGT	GTN	Glentanner Aerodrome	South	43°54′28″S 170°07′44″E	542 m (1,777 ft)	1,052 m (3,451 ft)
Gore	NZGC		Gore Aerodrome	South	46°09′24″S 168°53′54″E	60 m (198 ft)	1,282 m (4,206 ft)
Great Barrier Island (Claris)	NZGB	GBZ	**Great Barrier Aerodrome**	Great Barrier	36°14′29″S 175°28′19″E	6 m (21 ft)	950 m (3,117 ft)
Great Barrier Island (Ōkiwi)	NZOX		Okiwi Airfield	Great Barrier	36°08′47″S 175°23′13″E	3 m (10 ft)	750 m (2,461 ft)
Greymouth	NZGM	GMN	Greymouth Airport	South	42°27′42″S 171°11′24″E	3 m (11 ft)	1,031 m (3,383 ft)
Haast	NZHT		Haast Aerodrome	South	43°52′00″S 169°02′25″E	7 m (22 ft)	700 m (2,297 ft)
**Hamilton**	NZHN	HLZ	**Hamilton Airport**	North	37°51′59″S 175°20′07″E	52 m (172 ft)	2,059 m (6,755 ft)
Hanmer Springs	NZHM		Hanmer Springs Aerodrome	South	42°34′11″S 172°47′53″E	299 m (980 ft)	922 m (3,025 ft)
Hastings	NZHS		Hastings Aerodrome	North	39°38′48″S 176°46′01″E	20 m (64 ft)	1,075 m (3,527 ft)
Hāwera	NZHA		Hāwera Aerodrome	North	39°33′12″S 174°16′01″E	114 m (374 ft)	965 m (3,166 ft)
Hokitika	NZHK	HKK	**Hokitika Airport**	South	42°42′49″S 170°59′07″E	47 m (153 ft)	1,176 m (3,858 ft)
Invercargill	NZNV	IVC	**Invercargill Airport**	South	46°24′54″S 168°19′12″E	2 m (5 ft)	2,160 m (7,087 ft)
Kaikohe	NZKO	KKO	Kaikohe Aerodrome	North	35°27′04″S 173°49′02″E	175 m (573 ft)	1,540 m (5,052 ft)
Kaikōura	NZKI	KBZ	Kaikoura Airport	South	42°25′30″S 173°36′19″E	6 m (19 ft)	700 m (2,297 ft)
Kaipara Flats	NZKF		Kaipara Flats Aerodrome	North	36°24′23″S 174°35′14″E	27 m (90 ft)	839 m (2,753 ft)
Kaitaia	NZKT	KAT	**Kaitaia Airport**	North	35°04′12″S 173°17′07″E	82 m (270 ft)	1,402 m (4,600 ft)
Karamea	NZKM		**Karamea Aerodrome**	South	41°14′17″S 172°06′22″E	9 m (28 ft)	945 m (3,100 ft)
Kerikeri	NZKK	KKE	**Kerikeri Airport**	North	35°15′46″S 173°54′43″E	150 m (492 ft)	1,190 m (3,904 ft)
Lake Tekapo	NZTL		Lake Tekapo Airport	South	44°00′18″S 170°26′30″E	761 m (2,496 ft)	950 m (3,117 ft)
Makarora	NZMW		Makarora Airstrip	South	44°13′54″S 169°13′49″E	302 m (990 ft)	600 m (1,969 ft)
Mandeville	NZVL		Mandeville Aerodrome	South	45°59′25″S 168°48′44″E	102 m (335 ft)	980 m (3,215 ft)
Masterton	NZMS	MRO	Hood Aerodrome	North	40°58′24″S 175°38′01″E	111 m (364 ft)	1,205 m (3,953 ft)
Matamata	NZMA	MTA	Matamata Airport	North	37°44′04″S 175°44′31″E	55 m (182 ft)	1,089 m (3,573 ft)
Mercer	NZME		Mercer Airfield	North	37°15′33″S 175°06′53″E	9 m (30 ft)	1,057 m (3,468 ft)
Milford Sound	NZMF	MFN	**Milford Sound Airport**	South	44°40′24″S 167°55′24″E	3 m (10 ft)	767 m (2,516 ft)
Motueka	NZMK	MZP	Motueka Aerodrome	South	41°07′24″S 172°59′19″E	12 m (38 ft)	781 m (2,562 ft)
Mount Cook	NZMC	MON	Mount Cook Aerodrome	South	43°45′54″S 170°08′00″E	656 m (2,153 ft)	1,473 m (4,833 ft)
Murchison	NZMR		Murchison Aerodrome	South	41°47′48″S 172°18′54″E	162 m (532 ft)	570 m (1,870 ft)
Napier	NZNR	NPE	**Hawke's Bay Airport**	North	39°27′57″S 176°52′12″E	2 m (6 ft)	1,750 m (5,741 ft)
Nelson	NZNS	NSN	**Nelson Airport**	South	41°17′54″S 173°13′16″E	5 m (17 ft)	1,347 m (4,419 ft)
New Plymouth	NZNP	NPL	**New Plymouth Airport**	North	39°00′31″S 174°10′45″E	30 m (97 ft)	1,310 m (4,298 ft)
Oamaru	NZOU	OAM	Oamaru Airport	South	44°58′12″S 171°04′54″E	30 m (97 ft)	1,283 m (4,209 ft)
Ohakea	NZOH	OHA	RNZAF Base Ohakea	North	40°12′24″S 175°23′13″E	50 m (164 ft)	2,440 m (8,005 ft)
Omarama	NZOA		Omarama Airfield	South	44°29′12″S 169°59′10″E	421 m (1,380 ft)	1,387 m (4,551 ft)
Ōpōtiki	NZOP		Opotiki Aerodrome	North	38°01′21″S 177°18′26″E	8 m (25 ft)	1,020 m (3,346 ft)
Palmerston North	NZPM	PMR	**Palmerston North Airport**	North	40°19′14″S 175°37′10″E	46 m (151 ft)	1,902 m (6,240 ft)
Parakai	NZPI		West Auckland Airport	North	36°39′06″S 174°26′00″E	2 m (8 ft)	745 m (2,444 ft)
Paraparaumu	NZPP	PPQ	**Kapiti Coast Airport**	North	40°54′17″S 174°59′21″E	6 m (19 ft)	1,187 m (3,894 ft)
Pauanui	NZUN		Pauanui Aerodrome	North	37°01′18″S 175°51′49″E	6 m (19 ft)	848 m (2,782 ft)
Picton	NZPN	PCN	**Picton Aerodrome**	South	41°20′54″S 173°57′19″E	43 m (140 ft)	780 m (2,559 ft)
**Queenstown**	NZQN	ZQN	**Queenstown Airport**	South	45°01′16″S 168°44′21″E	357 m (1,171 ft)	1,777 m (5,830 ft)
Raglan	NZRA	RAG	Raglan Airfield	North	37°48′17″S 174°51′36″E	4 m (14 ft)	585 m (1,919 ft)
Rangiora	NZRT		Rangiora Airfield	South	43°17′24″S 172°32′30″E	55 m (180 ft)	1,180 m (3,871 ft)
Rangitata Island	NZRI		Rangitata Island Aerodrome	South	44°05′06″S 171°24′57″E	88 m (288 ft)	1,040 m (3,412 ft)
Rotorua	NZRO	ROT	**Rotorua Airport**	North	38°06′17″S 176°19′02″E	286 m (938 ft)	2,114 m (6,936 ft)
Roxburgh	NZRX		Roxburgh Aerodrome	South	45°30′42″S 169°19′00″E	154 m (506 ft)	1,273 m (4,177 ft)
Ruatoria	NZRR		Ruatoria Aerodrome	North	37°53′02″S 178°17′24″E	76 m (250 ft)	1,000 m (3,281 ft)
Ruawai	NZRW		Ruawai Airfield	North	36°05′45″S 173°58′31″E	2 m (6 ft)	717 m (2,352 ft)
Stewart Island / Rakiura	NZRC	SZS	**Ryan's Creek Aerodrome**	Stewart	46°53′59″S 168°06′07″E	86 m (282 ft)	632 m (2,073 ft)
Stratford	NZSD		Stratford Aerodrome	North	39°19′08″S 174°18′37″E	288 m (946 ft)	900 m (2,953 ft)
Taihape	NZVR		Taihape Airport	North	39°41′06″S 175°47′19″E	472 m (1,550 ft)	455 m (1,493 ft)
Tākaka	NZTK	KTF	**Tākaka Aerodrome**	South	40°48′48″S 172°46′33″E	30 m (100 ft)	832 m (2,730 ft)
Taumarunui	NZTM		Taumarunui Aerodrome	North	38°50′36″S 175°15′19″E	198 m (650 ft)	1,190 m (3,904 ft)
Taupō	NZAP	TUO	**Taupō Airport**	North	38°44′23″S 176°05′04″E	407 m (1,335 ft)	1,386 m (4,547 ft)
Tauranga	NZTG	TRG	**Tauranga Airport**	North	37°40′19″S 176°11′46″E	4 m (13 ft)	1,825 m (5,988 ft)
Te Anau / Manapouri	NZMO	TEU	Te Anau Airport	South	45°31′59″S 167°39′00″E	209 m (687 ft)	1,594 m (5,230 ft)
Te Kowhai	NZTE		Te Kowhai Aerodrome	North	37°44′42″S 175°09′31″E	35 m (115 ft)	983 m (3,225 ft)
Te Kūiti	NZTT		Te Kuiti Airfield	North	38°18′12″S 175°08′49″E	49 m (160 ft)	866 m (2,841 ft)
Thames	NZTH	TMZ	Thames Aerodrome	North	37°09′24″S 175°33′01″E	3 m (11 ft)	1,112 m (3,648 ft)
Timaru	NZTU	TIU	**Richard Pearse Airport**	South	44°18′10″S 171°13′31″E	27 m (89 ft)	1,280 m (4,199 ft)
Tokoroa	NZTO	TKZ	Tokoroa Aerodrome	North	38°14′12″S 175°53′34″E	372 m (1,221 ft)	1,120 m (3,675 ft)
Tūrangi	NZTN		Tūrangi Airport	North	38°58′06″S 175°48′49″E	372 m (1,220 ft)	860 m (2,822 ft)
Twizel	NZUK	TWZ	Pukaki Airport	South	44°14′06″S 170°07′06″E	480 m (1,575 ft)	1,530 m (5,020 ft)
Waiheke Island	NZKE	WIK	Waiheke Island Aerodrome	Waiheke	36°48′30″S 175°05′07″E	136 m (445 ft)	630 m (2,067 ft)
Waihi Beach	NZWV		Waihi Beach Aerodrome	North	37°25′48″S 175°57′07″E	1 m (4 ft)	584 m (1,916 ft)
Waimate	NZWM		Waimate Aerodrome	North	44°47′24″S 171°05′30″E	24 m (80 ft)	616 m (2,021 ft)
Waipukurau	NZYP		Waipukurau Aerodrome	North	39°59′48″S 176°32′13″E	131 m (430 ft)	1,055 m (3,461 ft)
Wairoa	NZWO	WIR	Wairoa Aerodrome	North	39°00′55″S 177°24′51″E	13 m (42 ft)	1,371 m (4,498 ft)
Wānaka	NZWF	WKA	**Wānaka Airport**	South	44°43′20″S 169°14′44″E	348 m (1,142 ft)	1,200 m (3,937 ft)
**Wellington**	NZWN	WLG	**Wellington Airport**	North	41°19′38″S 174°48′19″E	12 m (41 ft)	1,815 m (5,955 ft)
West Melton	NZWL		West Melton Aerodrome	South	43°28′36″S 172°23′48″E	93 m (305 ft)	997 m (3,271 ft)
Westport	NZWS	WSZ	**Westport Airport**	South	41°44′17″S 171°34′51″E	4 m (13 ft)	1,280 m (4,199 ft)
Whakatāne	NZWK	WHK	**Whakatāne Airport**	North	37°55′13″S 176°54′48″E	6 m (20 ft)	1,280 m (4,199 ft)
Whanganui	NZWU	WAG	**Whanganui Airport**	North	39°57′44″S 175°01′31″E	8 m (26 ft)	1,372 m (4,501 ft)
Whangārei	NZWR	WRE	**Whangarei Airport**	North	35°46′06″S 174°21′54″E	41 m (133 ft)	1,097 m (3,599 ft)
Whitianga	NZWT	WTZ	**Whitianga Aerodrome**	North	36°49′54″S 175°40′43″E	5 m (15 ft)	1,446 m (4,744 ft)

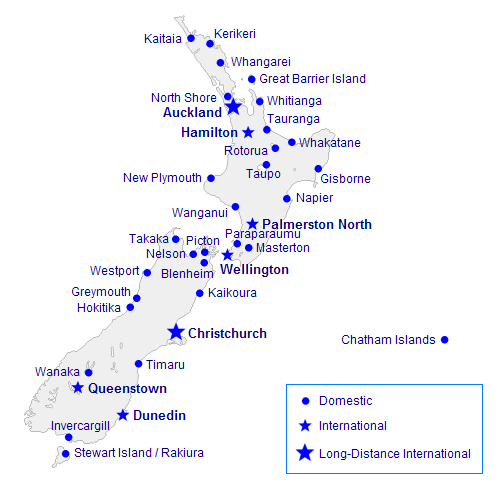
Map of airports in New Zealand with scheduled air services

== See also ==
- Transport in New Zealand
- List of busiest airports in New Zealand
- List of airports by ICAO code: N#NZ - New Zealand
- List of former Royal New Zealand Air Force stations
