= List of former Royal New Zealand Air Force stations =

Air force bases in New Zealand

This list of former RNZAF stations and bases includes most of the stations, airfields and administrative headquarters previously used by the Royal New Zealand Air Force.

== New Zealand ==
=== North Island ===
Base	Region	Year opened	Year closed	Notes
RNZAF Waipapakauri	Northland	1939	1945	Closed in 1945, with its facilities abandoned. The station hospital is now the Waipapakauri Hotel, while the runways have been converted back into farmland.
RNZAF Kaitaia	Northland	1942	1945	Built with large A shaped runways to accommodate American B-17 bomber aircraft. Transferred to civilian use as Kaitaia Airport in the postwar period.
RNZAF Onerahi	Northland	1939	1945	Transferred to civilian use as Whangarei Airport.
RNZAF Hobsonville	Auckland	1928	2002	Wing Commander A B Greenway was commanding officer, RNZAF Station Hobsonville, in late May 1948. The base was merged with RNZAF Base Whenuapai to form RNZAF Base Auckland. Now largely redeveloped into housing.
RNZAF Swanson	Auckland	1943	1945	Housed the Weapons training school in 1944, the site is now mostly residential area.
RNZAF Seagrove	Auckland	1942	1945	Reverted to farmland.
RNZAF Ardmore	Auckland	1943	1957	Now Ardmore Airport, a significant general aviation airport for the Auckland region.
RNZAF Te Rapa	Waikato	1942	1992	Now The Base
RNZAF Rukuhia	Waikato	1942	1946	Now Hamilton Airport.
RNZAF Te Awamutu	Waikato	1942	c. 1945	Functioned as store depot and engineering station, rather than an operational airfield
RNZAF Raglan	Waikato	1941		Still in use as Raglan Airstrip.
RNZAF Waharoa	Waikato	1942	1945	Still in use as Matamata Aerodrome.
RNZAF Tokoroa	Waikato	-	-	Held in reserve, but never used. Reverted to civilian use as Tokoroa Aerodrome.
RNZAF Tauranga	Bay of Plenty	1940	1944	Reverted to civilian use as Tauranga Airport.
RNZAF Rotorua	Bay of Plenty	1942	1945	Reverted to civilian use as Whakarewarewa Aerodrome. Whakarewarewa was replaced by the present Rotorua Airport and converted to residential housing.
RNZAF New Plymouth RNZAF Bell Block	Taranaki	1939	1945	Reverted to civilian use as New Plymouth Airport.
RNZAF Linton	Manawatū-Whanganui	1943	1943	Now the site of Linton Army Camp.
RNZAF Wereroa	Manawatū-Whanganui	1939	1942	Little remains of the current site today. The runways have been turned back into farmland, while the Speldhurst Country Estate has largely been developed over the training station. However, as of early 2021, several buildings remain on the East of the site.
RNZAF Feilding	Manawatū-Whanganui	1939	1945	Reverted to civilian use as Feilding Aerodrome.
RNZAF Milson	Manawatū-Whanganui	1942	1944	Reverted to civilian use as Palmerston North Airport.
RNZAF Kaitoke	Manawatū-Whanganui	1939	1945	Built to accommodate American B-17 bomber aircraft. Reverted to civilian use as Whanganui Airport.
RNZAF Masterton	Wellington	1939	1945	Reverted to civilian use, now hosts Wings over Wairarapa and serves as a general aviation airport.
RNZAF Gisborne	Gisborne	1942	1944	Reverted to civilian use as Gisborne Airport.
RNZAF Paraparaumu	Wellington	1941	1947	Reverted to civilian use as the main airport for Wellington during the postwar period until significant upgrades at Rongotai Airport. Now operates as a small general aviation aerodrome with the name Kapiti Coast Airport.
RNZAF Mangaroa	Wellington	1942	1949	Several buildings still remain on Flux Road.
RNZAF Hutt	Wellington	1939	1940	The Hutt Railway Workshops are still occupied by KiwiRail, the successor to New Zealand Railways.
RNZAF Rongotai	Wellington	1938	1945	Now Wellington International Airport. While the airport is no longer operated by the military, the RNZAF still perform operations here, in addition to maintaining a military logistics terminal on the Western Apron.
RNZAF Wellington	Wellington	1939	1945	Air Headquarters was located in Stout Street at Defence Headquarters, now the Ministry of Business Innovation and Employment building. Several parts of the National Museum were also taken over for military use. WAAF servicewomen were lodged in the Bristol Hotel in Cuba Street and the Molesworth Street Barracks on the corner of Molesworth and Hill Streets. Today the Bristol remains as a hotel and pub, but the Molesworth Street barracks were removed to make way for St. Pauls Cathedral. The former American camp at Anderson park was further used as temporary accommodation, now reverted to park area.

=== South Island ===
Base	Region	Year opened	Year closed	Notes
RNZAF Nelson	Nelson	1941	1946	Today the former RNZAF station remains open as Nelson Airport. Many of the RNZAF buildings and hangars are still in use today.
RNZAF Takaka	Tasman	1942	1945	In use today as Takaka Aerodrome.
RNZAF Motueka	Tasman	c. 1941	c. 1945	In use today as Motueka Aerodrome.
RNZAF Omaka	Marlborough	1939	1944	Today Omaka is a significant general aviation aerodrome in the Marlborough region. It is also home to a large collection of historical World War I and II aircraft, with aircraft owned by enthusiasts such as Stuart Trantrum, Peter Jackson and Mike Nicholls. The aerodrome features events such as Classic Fighters, and features a large museum featuring aviation heritage. Many former RNZAF buildings remain on site, with some used by a local Air Training Corps unit.
RNZAF Delta	Marlborough	1943	1944	Land reverted to farmland, with many areas being used as vineyards.
RNZAF Fairhall	Marlborough	1942	1943	Land reverted to farmland, with many areas being used as vineyards.
RNZAF Wairau Valley	Marlborough	c. 1943	c. 1944	Little information on the usage or history of the site, much is unknown.
RNZAF Dillons Point	Marlborough	--	--	Land held in reserve, but never used.
RNZAF Lake Grassmere	Marlborough	1938	c. 1947	Used for RNZAF operations and the nearby lake was used for training ops. The former lake bed/airfield site is now mainly used for solar salt production.
RNZAF Waimakariri	Canterbury	1942	1945	Returned to farm land.
RNZAF Eyreton	Canterbury	--	--	Land held in reserve, but never used.
RNZAF Christchurch Central	Canterbury	1940	1945	Requisitioned or rented buildings in the city center used for administrative and support purposes during World War II, now in civilian use.
RNZAF Addington	Canterbury	1939	1940	Functioned as a Technical Training School for airmen, riggers, and fitters. Located at the Addington Railway Workshops.
RNZAF Wigram	Canterbury	1923	1995	New Zealand's oldest air base. Now the home of the Air Force Museum of New Zealand.While the original plot of land remains, most of the extended base area has been converted into residential housing.
RNZAF Norwood	Canterbury	1939	1945	Mostly reverted to farm land. However, several hangar and accommodation block ruins can be found.
RNZAF Lyttelton	Canterbury	c. 1939	1945	Port depot, dispatched and received RNZAF personnel going overseas and to the North Island etc.
RNZAF Cashmere	Canterbury	1939	1945	Several buildings are owned by Heritage New Zealand and are open to the public. The University of Canterbury operates seismic equipment in the underground bunkers.
RNZAF Birdlings Flat	Canterbury	1939	1945	Training airstrip and firing / bomb range. Used for practicing bomb dropping and gunnery. Is now no longer in use.
RNZAF Darfield	Canterbury	--	--	Land held in reserve, but never used. May have been selected as a satellite field for RNZAF Te Pirita.
RNZAF Te Pirita	Canterbury	1942	1943	Returned to farm land.
RNZAF Ashburton	Canterbury	1942	1944	Reverted to civilian use as Ashburton Aerodrome.
RNZAF Maronan	Canterbury	--	--	Land held in reserve, but never used.
RNZAF Mayfield	Canterbury	--	--	Land held in reserve, but never used.
RNZAF Timaru	Canterbury	1939	1945	Reverted to civilian use as Richard Pearse Airport.
RNZAF Waitaki	Otago	1941	1945	Now Oamaru Airport.
RNZAF Ranfurly	Otago	c. 1942	1945	Reverted to civilian or agricultural use.
RNZAF Cromwell	Otago	1942	1945	Reverted to civilian use as Cromwell Racecourse Aerodrome
RNZAF Hillside	Otago	1939	1940	The Hillside Railway Workshops are still occupied by KiwiRail, the successor to New Zealand Railways.
RNZAF Taieri	Otago	1939	1959	Reverted to civilian use as Taieri Aerodrome. Several air force hangars and buildings remain.
RNZAF Outram	Otago	--	--	Land held in reserve, but never used.
RNZAF Momona	Otago	--	--	Land held in reserve, but never for wartime purposes. Site of the new Dunedin Airport to replace Taieri Aerodrome in 1962.
RNZAF Milton	Otago	--	--	Land held in reserve, but never used.
RNZAF Balclutha	Otago	c. 1942	1945	Reverted to civilian use as Balclutha Aerodrome.
RNZAF Middlemarch	Otago	c. 1942	1945	Served as an emergency or satellite landing ground for the nearby RNZAF Taieri.
RNZAF Sutton	Otago	c. 1942	1945	Emergency / Practice airfield. Reverted to agricultural land.
RNZAF Queenstown	Otago	1940	1945	Reverted to civilian use, now Queenstown Airport
RNZAF Glenorchy	Otago	c. 1942	1945	Emergency landing and training ground, reverted to civilian use, now Glenorchy Aerodrome
RNZAF Makarora	Otago	c. 1942	1945	Served as an emergency landing ground. Reverted to civilian use, now Makarora Airstrip
RNZAF Karamea	West Coast	c. 1940	1945	In use today as Karamea Aerodrome.
RNZAF Jacksons Bay	West Coast	c. 1942	1945	Emergency or Auxiliary landing ground. Reverted to civilian use.
RNZAF Haast	West Coast	1942	1945	In 1942, the RNZAF had the aerodrome's existing primary runway extended, so that it could be used by Vickers Vincents from RNZAF Nelson in emergencies or during specific patrols. Reverted to civilian use postwar as Haast Aerodrome.
RNZAF Mount Cook Hermitage	West Coast	c. 1942	1945	Auxiliary and emergency landing ground, reverted to civilian use, now Mount Cook Aerodrome
RNZAF Waiho	West Coast	c. 1942	1945	Emergency landing site. Destroyed on 21 December 1984, when the Waiho River burst its banks.
RNZAF Landsborough	West Coast	c. 1942	1945	Satellite and emergency landing ground, now part of the Landsborough Flats.
RNZAF Mussel Point	West Coast	c. 1942	1945	Served as an emergency or auxiliary airfield, now largely rural land.
RNZAF Arawata	West Coast	c. 1942	1945	Auxiliary and emergency landing field, reverted to original state.
RNZAF Hokitika	West Coast	c. 1942	1945	Located on the south side of the Hokitika River. Reverted to civilian use postwar, but closed in 1948. A replacement airport was built in the hills northeast of the city.
RNZAF Greymouth	West Coast	c. 1940	1945	Reverted to civilian use, now Greymouth Airport
RNZAF Inchbonnie	West Coast	c. 1942	1945	Auxiliary and emergency landing ground. Reverted to farmland.
RNZAF Westport	West Coast	1942	1945	Reverted to civilian use, now Westport Airport
RNZAF Gore	Southland	1939	1945	Reverted to civilian use as Gore Aerodrome.
RNZAF Dawsons Farm RNZAF Invercargill	Southland	1939	1945	RNZAF Dawsons Farm remained operational throughout World War II, while the new Invercargill Airport was constructed. Due to its proximity to Antarctica, Invercargill Airport retains some minor military use by the Royal New Zealand Air Force, Royal Australian Air Force, United States Air National Guard, and Aeronautica Militaire.

== See also ==
- Royal New Zealand Air Force
- List of New Zealand military bases
- New Zealand Defence Force
- List of airports in New Zealand
