= NZPI =

NZPI can stand for various things:

- Parakai Aerodrome, NZPI code
- New Zealand Planning Institute
