= Thames Aerodrome =

- IATA: TMZ; ICAO: NZTH

Summary
- Operator: Thames-Coromandel District Council
- Location: Thames, New Zealand
- Built: 1940
- Elevation AMSL: 10 ft / 3 m
- Coordinates: 37°9′36″S 175°32′58″E
- Website: http://www.tcdc.govt.nz/Our-Services/Airfields/Thames-Airfield-NZTH/
- Interactive map of Thames Aerodrome

Runways
Direction	Length		Surface
Direction	ft	m	Surface
14/32	3,648	1,112	Gravel
05/23	2,319	707	Gravel

The Thames Aerodrome serves the town of Thames, in the Waikato region of the North Island of New Zealand. It is 3 km south of the town of Thames. The Aerodrome is named in honour of former Thames resident Air Chief Marshal Sir Keith Park, Commander of 11 Group Fighter Command during the Battle of Britain.

== See also ==
- List of airports in New Zealand
- List of airlines of New Zealand
- Transport in New Zealand

== Sources ==
- AIP New Zealand Aerodrome Chart (PDF)
