= Pukaki Airport =

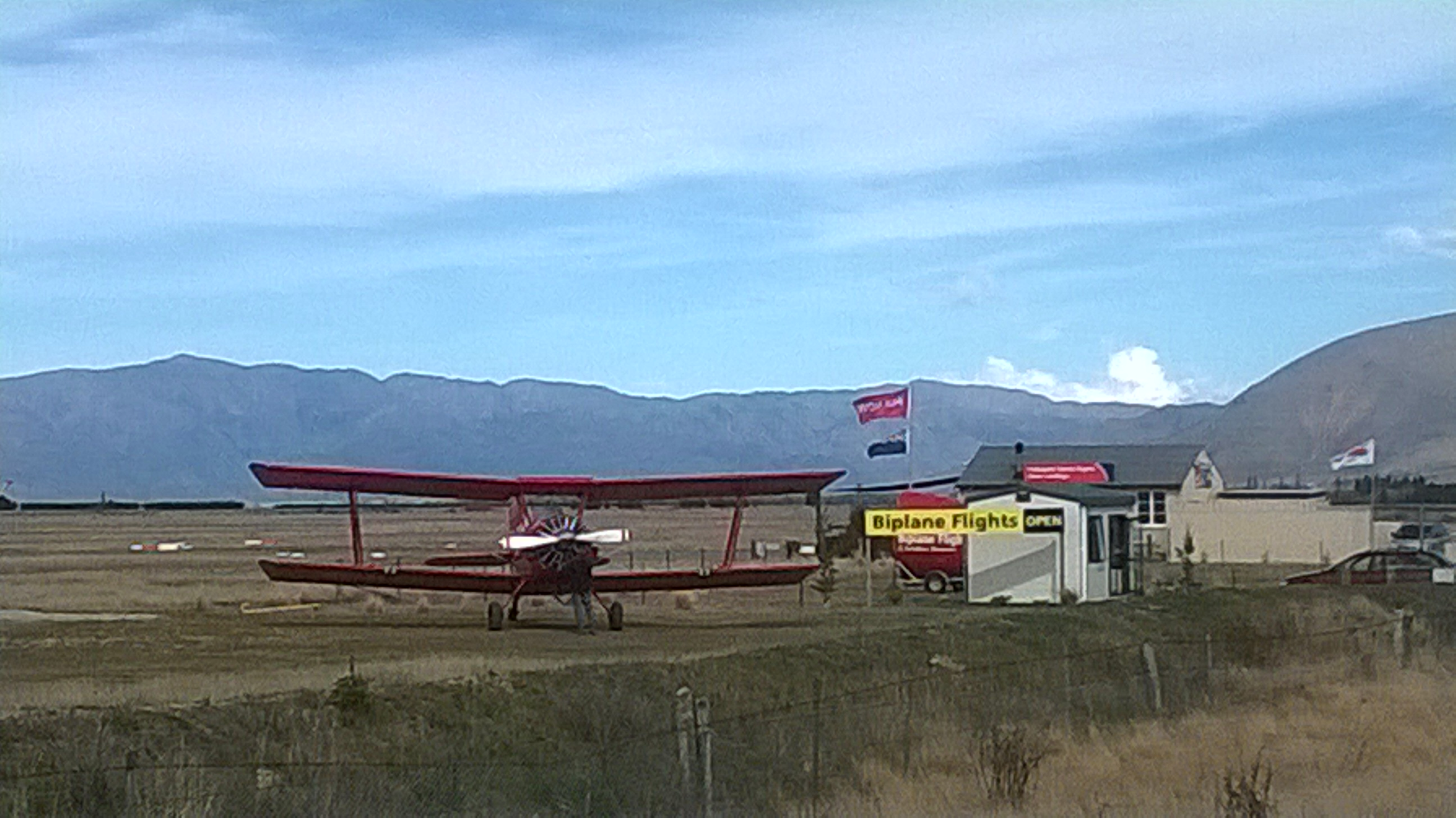
- Pukaki Airport in 2014
- IATA: TWZ; ICAO: NZUK

Summary
- Airport type: Public
- Operator: Pukaki Airport Authority
- Location: Twizel, New Zealand
- Elevation AMSL: 1,575 ft / 480 m
- Coordinates: 44°14′13″S 170°7′8″E
- Website: http://www.airportpukaki.co.nz
- Interactive map of Pukaki Airport

Runways
Direction	Length		Surface
Direction	ft	m	Surface
33/15	3,550	1,082	asphalt
07/25	1,804	550	grass

Pukaki Airport (IATA: TWZ, ICAO: NZUK) is a small airport in the Mackenzie District of the South Island of New Zealand. The airport is located about 3 km north from the township of Twizel and is 284 km from Christchurch.

The airport contains a fully automated Met Service weather station, thirteen hangars, and fuel supplies.

Resident operators offer charter and scenic flights from the aerodrome.

A record low temperature was set at Pukaki Airport of -19.8 °C on the morning of 23 June 2015.

The airport was also one of the filming locations of the 2009 zombie movie Last of the Living.

== See also ==
- List of airports in New Zealand
- List of airlines of New Zealand
- Transport in New Zealand
