= Waiheke Island Aerodrome =

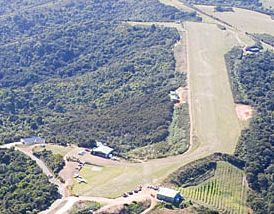
- IATA: WIK; ICAO: NZKE

Summary
- Airport type: Private
- Operator: Waiheke Airport Management Ltd
- Location: Onetangi Bay
- Elevation AMSL: 445 ft / 137 m
- Coordinates: 36°48′30″S 175°05′07″E
- Interactive map of Waiheke Island Aerodrome

Runways
Direction	Length		Surface
Direction	ft	m	Surface
17/35	2,123	655	Grass

Waiheke Island Aerodrome (IATA: WIK, ICAO: NZKE) is a private airport on Waiheke Island, 17 nautical miles northeast of Auckland, New Zealand.

== General ==
Waiheke Island Aerodrome is situated on the top of a ridge line south of Onetangi Bay and is the only airport on Waiheke Island. It is privately owned and operated and prior permission to land is required. The airport is used primarily for residents of and visitors to Waiheke Island where Waiheke Wings is the only island-based operator. The airfield is also used for medevac from Waiheke Island to Auckland hospitals.

The grass runway is positioned on the top of the ridge line with the northerly landing direction preferred due to the uphill slope. As the area features significant changes in topography there is the possibility of tricky crosswinds, sometimes coming from both sides of the runway concurrently. This, along with the local noise sensitivity, is one reason why prior permission to land is required before planning of any trip to the airfield.

The airfield is also the only licensed landing site for helicopters on Waiheke Island, although there are other private landing sites but with capped monthly landing counts.

== Sources ==
- NZAIP Volume 4 AD

https://www.aip.net.nz/pdf/NZKE_51.1_52.1.pdf

== See also ==
- List of airlines of New Zealand
- List of airports in New Zealand
- Transport in New Zealand
