= Rangiora Airport =

Airport in Rangiora, New Zealand

Rangiora Airfield
- IATA: none; ICAO: NZRT

Summary
- Coordinates: 43.2892°S 172.5413°E
- Website: www.rangiora.com/pages/rangiora-airport-and-airfield.php
- Interactive map of Rangiora Airfield

Rangiora Airfield (NZRT) is located 4.8 kilometres (3 miles) west-north-west of Rangiora township, north of Christchurch, New Zealand. It is managed by the Waimakariri District Council. It is the base of startup airline Electric Air. The company operates ZK-EAL, a Pipistrel Alpha Electro from the airfield.

It has three grass runways. The main, 950-metre (3,120-foot) long capable of handling aircraft up to DC-3 size. The runways are unlit, and users are asked to take care when approaching.

There are 40 private hangars located on the airfield site as this is a recreational facility. Users ask that the public respect private property on the field.

Jet A1 and AvGas are available with the use of a 'Swipe Card'.

== See also ==
- List of airports in New Zealand
- List of airlines of New Zealand
- Transport in New Zealand
