= Whitianga Aerodrome =

- IATA: WTZ; ICAO: NZWT

Summary
- Airport type: Private
- Operator: Mercury Bay Aero Club, PO Box 44, Whitianga.
- Location: Whitianga, New Zealand
- Elevation AMSL: 49 ft (15 m)
- Coordinates: 36°49′44″S 175°40′57″E
- Interactive map of Whitianga Aerodrome

Runways
Direction	Length		Surface
Direction	ft	m	Surface
04/22	4,678	1,426	Grass
16/34	2,286	697	Grass

Whitianga Aerodrome (IATA: WTZ, ICAO: NZWT) serves the town of Whitianga, New Zealand. The aerodrome is located 1.5 NM west of Whitianga on the eastern side of the Coromandel Peninsula in the North Island of New Zealand.

The aerodrome is operated by the Mercury Bay Aero Club. The aerodrome is popular with model aircraft enthusiasts and glider pilots.

== Airlines and destinations ==
Whitianga Aerodrome is connected to Tauranga Airport and Great Barrier Aerodrome (Claris) by Sunair, and to Auckland Airport by Barrier Air.

Air Auckland bases an aircraft at Whitianga used for both scheduled services and sightseeing charters.

== See also ==
- List of airports in New Zealand
- List of airlines of New Zealand
- Transport in New Zealand
