= R. F. Joyce Observatory =

- Observatory code: R65
- Location: Bells Road, West Melton, Christchurch, New Zealand
- Coordinates: 43.4981°S 172.3505°E
- Website: https://www.cas.org.nz/

R. F. Joyce Observatory is the home observatory of the Canterbury Astronomical Society (CAS) and is situated near West Melton, Christchurch, New Zealand.

The observatory is the result of the bequest of R. F. Joyce, a founding member and former President of the CAS.

The primary instruments in use are a 16" Meade RCX400, a 14.5" Cassegrain telescope, two 11" Schmidt-Cassegrain telescopes, and a 120mm refractor.
