= Wairoa Aerodrome =

Coordinates: 39°00′25″S 177°24′54″E

- IATA: WIR; ICAO: NZWO

Summary
- Location: Wairoa, New Zealand
- Elevation AMSL: 42 ft (13 m)
- Interactive map of Wairoa Aerodrome

Runways
Direction	Length		Surface
Direction	ft	m	Surface
16/34	4,498	1,371	Bitumen/Grass

Wairoa Aerodrome (IATA: WIR, ICAO: NZWO) is a small airport located on the northern outskirts of Wairoa, in Hawke's Bay, New Zealand. Wairoa Aerodrome provides a service for light aircraft and is used mainly for air charter operations. In 2023 Sunair commenced a Napier to Wairoa route.

== Operational data ==
The Wairoa Aerodrome runway is a 1,371 m (4,498 ft) long grass strip with a 914 m (2,999 ft) all-weather sealed strip on its southern two thirds.

== Airlines and destinations ==
Sunair connects Wairoa Aerodrome to Hawke's Bay Airport (Napier).

== See also ==
- List of airports in New Zealand
- List of airlines of New Zealand
- Transport in New Zealand
