= Alexandra Aerodrome =

Airport in New Zealand

- IATA: ALR; ICAO: NZLX

Summary
- Airport type: Public
- Operator: Central Otago District Council
- Serves: Alexandra, New Zealand
- Elevation AMSL: 752 ft (229 m)
- Coordinates: 45°12′42″S 169°22′24″E
- Interactive map of Alexandra Aerodrome

Runways
Direction	Length		Surface
Direction	ft	m	Surface
01/19	2,139	652	Grass
14R/32L	3,937	1,200	Asphalt
14L/32R	3,937	1,200	Grass

Alexandra Aerodrome (IATA: ALR, ICAO: NZLX) is an aerodrome 2 NM (3.7 km) northwest of Alexandra, New Zealand.

== History ==
The aerodrome saw South Pacific Airlines of New Zealand (SPANZ) operate Douglas DC-3 services from December 1960 to February 1966; then Mount Cook Airlines used Britten-Norman Islanders from 1969 to 1991, connecting to Dunedin and Queenstown. Goldfields Air flew during 1985–86 to Christchurch. Pacifica Air flew into Alexandra during 1988–89; and Airlink during 1989.

In 2007-2008 Mainland Air trialled scheduled services from Dunedin to Alexandra and Queenstown, but due to lack of patronage these did not continue. Mainland Aviation College, a division of Mainland Air, set up a flight training college in late 2009 which no longer operates in Alexandra.

The Central Otago Flying Club has operated from the aerodrome for over 50 years with various aircraft. In 2021 the club replaced their ageing Cessna 172 (ZK-ERW) with a 6-cylinder 195 hp Cessna 172XP (ZK-XPD) and a Cessna 150 Aerobat (ZK-DNO).

In mid 2025 both of these aircraft were replaced with a 4-cylinder 180hp Cessna 172 (ZK-TFS) which is better suited for member hire and flight training.

== Operational Information ==
- Circuit
  - Powered aircraft
    - 01/19, 32 Left hand
    - 14 Right hand
  - Gliders and tugs
    - 14 Left hand
    - 32 Right hand
- FAL
  - Mobil Aerostop, Jet A1, Avgas100
  - BP Jet A1
  - RFS CAT1 located in terminal area

== See also ==
- List of airports in New Zealand
- List of airlines of New Zealand
- Transport in New Zealand

== Sources ==
- NZAIP Volume 4 AD
- New Zealand AIP
- Alexandra Aerodrome at Airports Worldwide
- Central Otago Flying Club
