= Mercer Airfield =

- IATA: none; ICAO: NZME

Summary
- Airport type: Private
- Owner: Neil Young
- Operator: Palms on George Ltd
- Location: Mercer, New Zealand
- Elevation AMSL: 30 ft (9.1 m)
- Coordinates: 37°15′27″S 175°6′54″E
- Website: Mercer Airport Website
- Interactive map of Mercer Airfield

Runways
Direction	Length		Surface
Direction	ft	m	Surface
09R/27L	2,460	750	Grass

Mercer Airfield (ICAO: NZME) is an uncontrolled aerodrome 3.23 NM (6 km) northeast of Mercer Village in the Waikato region of New Zealand.

== History ==
Mercer Airfield was developed by Jim and Libby Lyver. Little information is available however, Mercer Backpackers relocated their operations to the airport as far back as 2002.

In December 2010, Mercer Airport was put up for sale by its then-owner the Auckland Recreational Airparks Trust (ARA Trust); with a tender closing on 16 December 2010. It was published by the Sports Aviation Association (Auckland Chapter) Inc; that the airfield had been acquired by Neil Young.

In May 2014, the Auckland Aero Club held their annual Club Competition at Mercer Airfield.

In 2016, the 56th New Zealand Association of Women in Aviation Annual Rally and Conference was held at Mercer Airfield between 1 and 6 June. In addition to the NZAWA, members from the Australian Women Pilots' Association (AWPA) were also in attendance. In November 2016, Mercer Airfield hosted the Flying NZ Northern Region Competitions.

== Operational information ==
Under the ownership of the ARA Trust, the airfield was used primarily for recreational flying.

Nowadays, Mercer Airport operates primarily for commercial reasons such as skydiving, training and public flying. There are also Helicopter operations on, and north of the airfield.

Mercer Airfield is used as a secondary training ground for Helicopter Flight Training Ltd.

== Accidents and incidents ==
Accidents and incidents that occurred at or near Mercer Airport include:

- 25 January 2000 – A Piper PA-23-250 over-ran the runway due to wet weather. No Injuries, however the aircraft sustained substantial damage.
- 9 August 2000 – A Cessna U206 operating on a parachuting flight lost sight of the runway upon landing and 'landed short of the strip'. Pilot sustained no injuries, however plane suffered substantial damage.
- 19 October 2006 – A Cessna A185E crashed on touchdown at the Airfield. The pilot suffered no injuries, however the plane flipped onto its top.
- 17 August 2009 – There was a near collision near Mercer Airport.
- 18 February 2012 – The engine of a Cessna 182 operating on a parachuting flight lost power on final approach and landed in a paddock before the runway. Pilot sustained no injuries, however plane suffered substantial damage.
- 1 October 2015 – A minor crash occurred after a microlight plane crashed at the Airfield. The pilot suffered minor injuries, however, he did survive.

== See also ==
- List of airports in New Zealand
- List of airlines of New Zealand
- Transport in New Zealand
