= Foxpine Aerodrome =

Aerodrome in New Zealand

- IATA: none; ICAO: NZFP

Summary
- Airport type: Private
- Location: Foxton, New Zealand
- Elevation AMSL: 39 ft / 12 m
- Coordinates: 40°27′24″S 175°16′12″E
- Interactive map of Foxpine Aerodrome

Runways
| Direction | Length | | Surface |
| Direction | ft | m | Surface |
|---|---|---|---|
| 09/27 | 3,130 | 954 | Grass |

Foxpine Aerodrome (ICAO NZFP) is a small aerodrome located northwest of, and on the border with, Foxton, New Zealand. The aerodrome has one grass runway with headings 09/27 and a length of about 954 m (3,130 ft).

Covering nearly 12 ha (30 acres), the aerodrome is privately owned. It was established in 1977 by Noel Oxnam, the owner of a family-run timber mill in Foxton. In 1978, he obtained an air service licence under the name Foxpine Air Charter, allowing him to operate air charter and taxi services from Foxton. In May 1986, the company launched a scheduled service between Palmerston North and Wellington. However, the service proved unviable and ceased operations twelve months later, in May 1987.

The aerodrome is currently owned by Foxpine Airfield Ltd, whose majority shareholders are Keven Roberts and John Whitehead.

== Accidents ==
On April 5, 2013 a Piper Cherokee over ran the runway. The crash was caused by an engine failure while doing touch and gos.

== See also ==
- List of airports in New Zealand
