= Greymouth Airport =

Airport

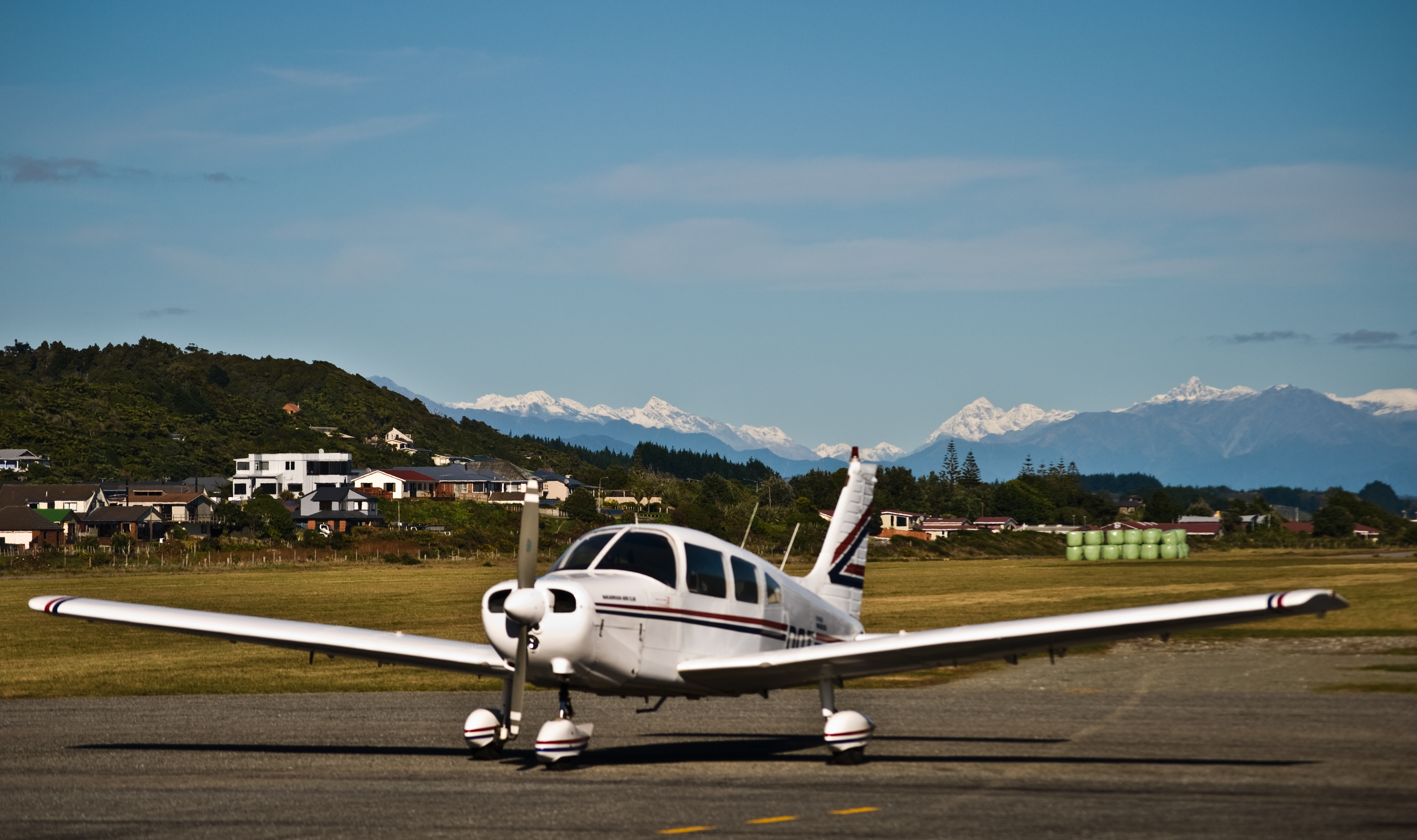
- Greymouth Airport, West Coast, New Zealand, 12 May 2008
- IATA: GMN; ICAO: NZGM

Summary
- Airport type: Public
- Operator: Grey District Council
- Location: Greymouth
- Elevation AMSL: 14 ft / 4 m
- Coordinates: 42°27′42″S 171°11′24″E
- Interactive map of Greymouth Airport

Runways
| Direction | Length | | Surface |
| Direction | ft | m | Surface |
|---|---|---|---|
| 01/19 | 3,579 | 1,091 | Bitumen |

Greymouth Airport (IATA: GMN, ICAO: NZGM) is a small, uncontrolled aerodrome located in the suburb of Blaketown, 1 Nautical mile (1.9 km) south of the Greymouth CBD on the West Coast of the South Island of New Zealand.

The aerodrome is operated by the Grey District Council and is available for general use without notice to the operator. Hangarage for light aircraft and refuelling facilities are available.

The most recent commercial flights were operated by Air West Coast which began on 8 November 2002 direct to Westport then onto Wellington and to Christchurch. These services were discontinued on 1 August 2008, apparently due to high costs and strong competition from Air New Zealand. Coast Air operated a daily de Havilland Twin Otter service to Christchurch and Nelson from 1986 to 1988.

Today there are no scheduled flights using the airport. Charter flights could previously be arranged via Air West Coast. One such charter flight collected passengers off the TranzAlpine train at Greymouth station and flew them back to Christchurch over Mt Cook and the Glaciers.

== See also ==
- List of airports in New Zealand
- List of airlines of New Zealand
- Transport in New Zealand
