= Ashburton Aerodrome =

- IATA: ASG; ICAO: NZAS

Summary
- Airport type: Public
- Operator: Ashburton Airport Authority
- Location: Ashburton, New Zealand
- Elevation AMSL: 298 ft / 91 m
- Coordinates: 43°54′12″S 171°47′48″E
- Interactive map of Ashburton Aerodrome

Runways
| Direction | Length | | Surface |
| Direction | ft | m | Surface |
|---|---|---|---|
| 02/20 | 2,943 | 897 | Grass |
| 06/24 | 4,554 | 1,388 | Grass |
| 11/29 | 3,360 | 1,024 | Grass |
| 16/34 | 3,543 | 1,080 | Grass |

Ashburton Aerodrome (IATA: ASG, ICAO: NZAS) is a small airport 2 NM (3.7 km; 2.3 mi) to the east of Ashburton township on the east coast of the South Island, New Zealand. Newmans Air operated a Christchurch to Queenstown service via Ashburton in the 1980s which allowed skiers to connect to the nearby skifield of Mt. Hutt. Currently there are no scheduled services operating to Ashburton.

The airfield is home to the Ashburton Aviation Museum, containing a collection of around 40 military and civilian aircraft and related displays.

The Ashburton District Council, as owner, increased fees in 2023/24 for users of the airport as part of the long term development plan. It was claimed that the increase in fees led to a drop of 1700 aircraft movements. The Aviation Museum also raised concerns about their viability because of a 75% increase in rental charges.

== Operational information ==
- Pilot Controlled Lighting Runway 16/34
- Circuit: All runways left hand
  - Circuit Height: 1300 ft AMSL

== See also ==
- List of airports in New Zealand
- List of airlines of New Zealand
- Transport in New Zealand

== Sources ==
- NZAIP Volume 4 AD
- AIP New Zealand (PDF)
