= Canala Airport =

Airport in New Caledonia

- IATA: none; ICAO: NWWX

Summary
- Airport type: Public
- Operator: Government
- Serves: Canala, New Caledonia
- Elevation AMSL: 7 ft (2.1 m)
- Coordinates: 21°31′13″S 165°58′19″E

Map
- Location of the airport in New Caledonia

Runways
Direction	Length		Surface
Direction	m	ft	Surface
11/29	950	3,116	Asphalt
- Sources: AIP France, DAFIF

Canala Airport (ICAO: NWWX) is an airport serving Canala, a commune in the North Province of New Caledonia (French: Nouvelle-Calédonie), an overseas territory (territoire d'outre-mer) of France in the Pacific Ocean.
