= Tokoroa Aerodrome =

- IATA: TKZ; ICAO: NZTO

Summary
- Airport type: Public use
- Operator: South Waikato District Council
- Location: Tokoroa, New Zealand
- Elevation AMSL: 1,221 ft / 372 m
- Coordinates: 38°14′12″S 175°53′34″E

Map
- Location of aerodrome in Waikato

Runways
Direction	Length		Surface
Direction	ft	m	Surface
13/31	2,788	850	Bitumen
13/31	3,674	1,120	Grass

Tokoroa Aerodrome (IATA: TKZ, ICAO: NZTO) is a public aerodrome owned by the South Waikato District Council and is located one nautical mile east-southeast of Tokoroa township in the Waikato region of New Zealand.

The airfield plays home to the Tokoroa and Districts Aero Club Inc. and a keen community of RC model aircraft flyers.

== See also ==
- List of airports in New Zealand
- List of airlines of New Zealand
- Transport in New Zealand
