= West Melton, New Zealand =

Town in Canterbury, New Zealand

West Melton
- Minor urban area
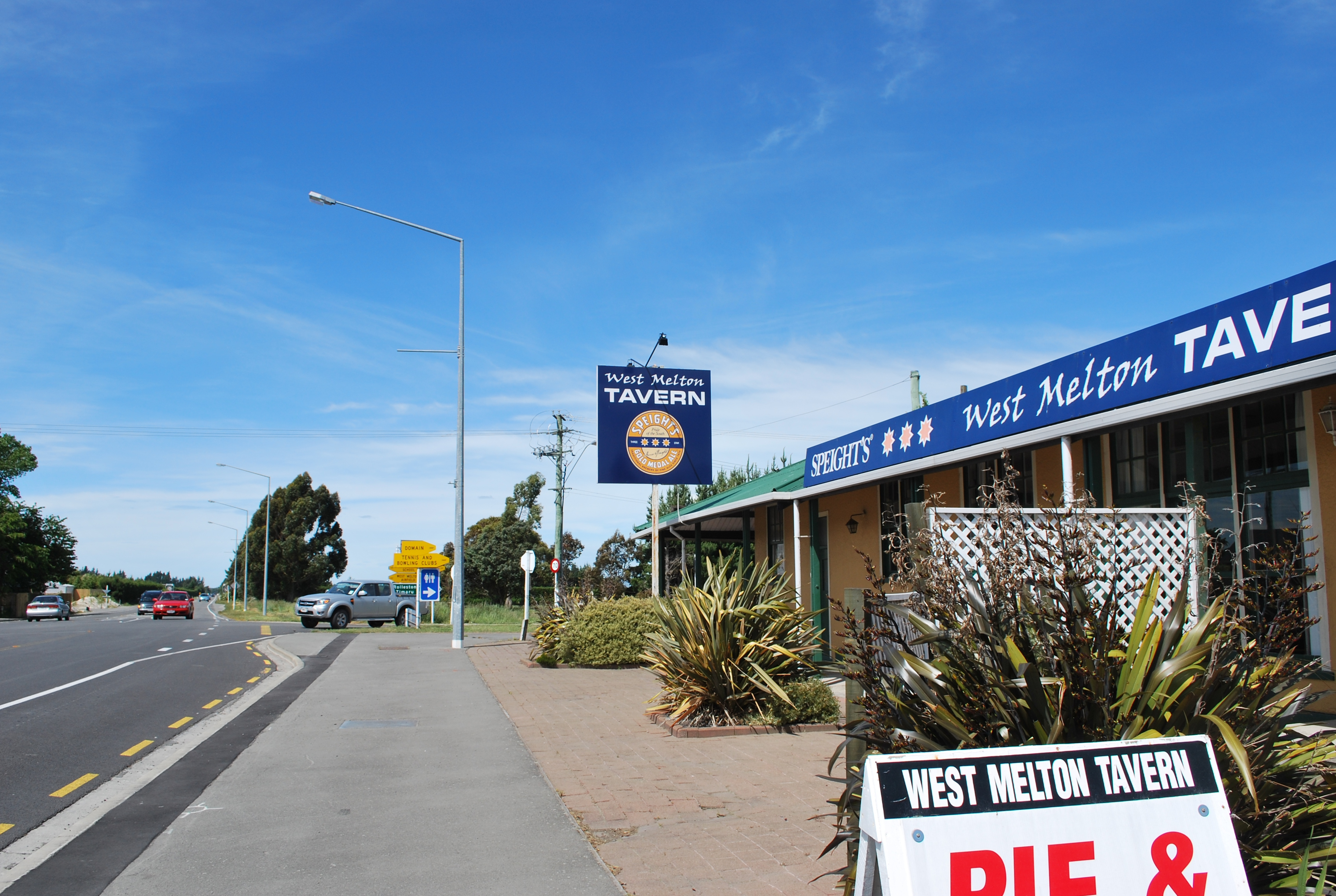
- West Melton Tavern, 2011
- Interactive map of West Melton
- Coordinates: 43°31′S 172°22′E
- Country: New Zealand
- Region: Canterbury
- Territorial authority: Selwyn District
- Ward: Malvern
- Community: Malvern
- Electorates: Selwyn; Te Tai Tonga (Māori)

Government
  - Territorial authority: Selwyn District Council
  - Regional council: Environment Canterbury
  - Mayor of Selwyn: Lydia Gliddon
  - Selwyn MP: Nicola Grigg
  - Te Tai Tonga MP: Tākuta Ferris

Area
  - Total: 2.99 km^{2} (1.15 sq mi)
- Elevation: 88 m (289 ft)

Population (June 2025)
  - Total: 2,700
  - Density: 900/km^{2} (2,300/sq mi)
- Time zone: UTC+12 (New Zealand Standard Time)
  - Summer (DST): UTC+13 (New Zealand Daylight Time)
- Local iwi: Ngāi Tahu

West Melton is a town in the Selwyn District, in the Canterbury region of New Zealand's South Island. It is located 24 kilometres (15 mi) west of Christchurch and is part of the Christchurch metropolitan area. The town has a population of 2,450 (June 2023), making it the 123rd-largest urban area in New Zealand, the 16th-largest in Canterbury and fifth-largest in the Selwyn District (behind Darfield and before Leeston).

== History ==
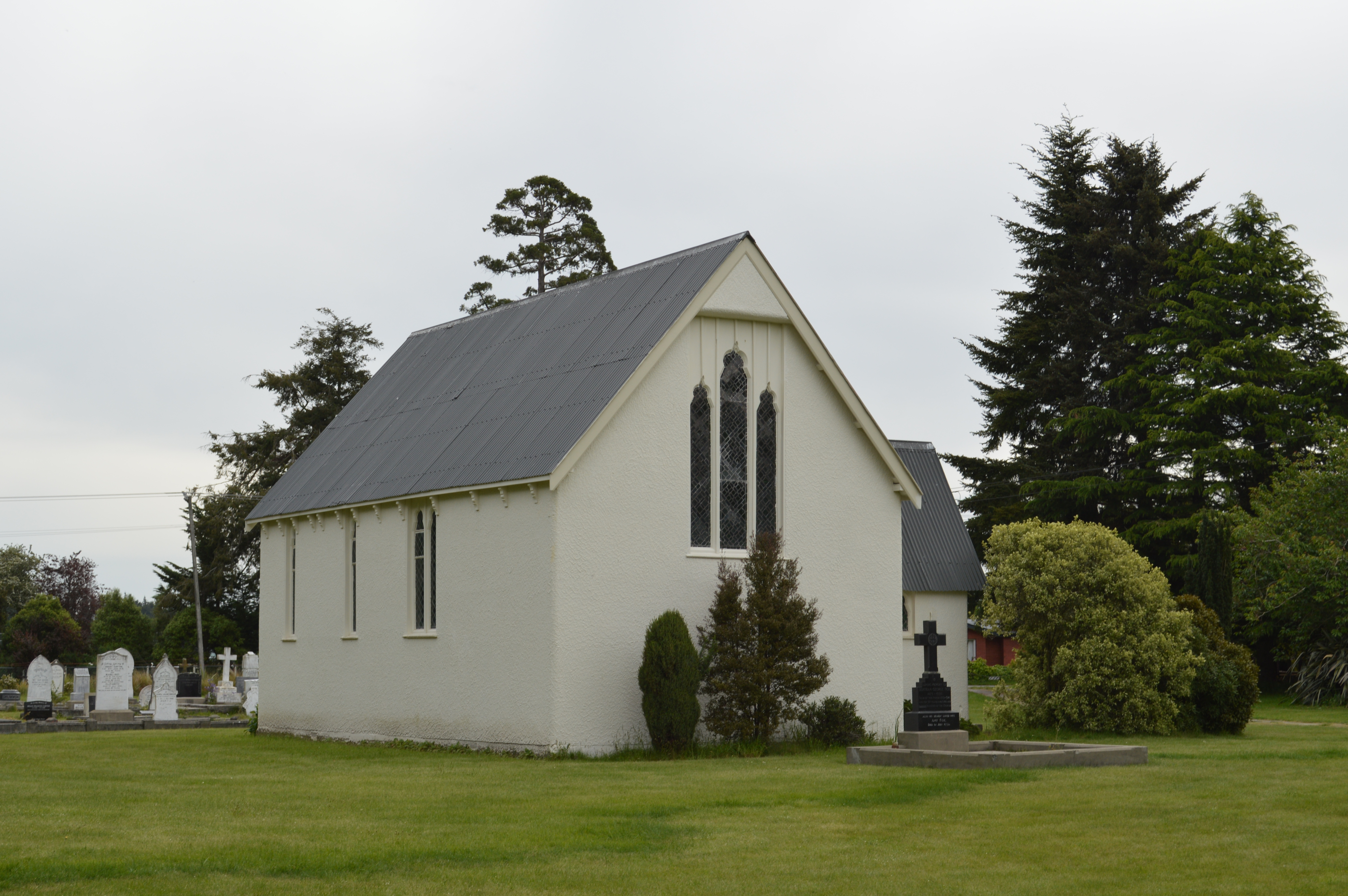
St Paul's Anglican church, 2013

West Melton was first settled in the 1870s, where it has long been associated with horse racing (trotting), cropping, and sheep farming. Recently, it has become associated with wine growing and deer farming. In 1881, Alfred Saunders arrived in West Melton, where he bought a farm that he referred to as a "bleak and wild looking property".

On 26 October 2014, West Melton residents celebrated the town's 150th anniversary.

=== Urban expansion ===
In 2007, West Melton saw the start of its urban expansion. Gainsborough and Halkett Grove subdivisions were the first developments to be built, followed by Preston Downs to the west of Gainsborough and a third subdivision called Wilfield built to the south of Gainsborough.

One more subdivision and a southern extension of Wilfield are planned to be built. This third subdivision is being developed by Hughes Developments Ltd, and will be built to the east of Gainsborough. A retirement village, developed by Marama Te Wai Ltd, is to be built to the west of Preston Downs. This is in contrast to scaled-down plans. In December 2020, original plans were for a 50-hectare subdivision to be built, however, in June 2022, only 12.5 hectares was allocated for zoning change.

The spread of housing developments into fertile rural land has led to tensions between the traditional farming community and recent arrivals. It is common for these tensions to spill onto community notice boards.

== Demographics ==
West Melton is described by Statistics New Zealand as a small urban area, and covers 2.99 km^{2} (1.15 sq mi). It had an estimated population of 2,700 as of June 2025, with a population density of 903 people per km^{2}.

Historical population for West Melton
Year	Pop.	±% p.a.
2006	327	—
2013	666	+10.70%
2018	1,971	+24.23%
2023	2,409	+4.10%
The 2006 population is for a larger area of 5.32 km^{2}. Source:

West Melton had a population of 2,409 in the 2023 New Zealand census, an increase of 438 people (22.2%) since the 2018 census, and an increase of 1,743 people (261.7%) since the 2013 census. There were 1,179 males, 1,221 females, and 6 people of other genders in 798 dwellings. 1.2% of people identified as LGBTIQ+. The median age was 43.4 years (compared with 38.1 years nationally). There were 597 people (24.8%) aged under 15 years, 228 (9.5%) aged 15 to 29, 1,206 (50.1%) aged 30 to 64, and 378 (15.7%) aged 65 or older.

People could identify as more than one ethnicity. The results were 94.0% European (Pākehā); 7.5% Māori; 1.0% Pasifika; 4.2% Asian; 0.4% Middle Eastern, Latin American and African New Zealanders (MELAA); and 2.4% other, which includes people giving their ethnicity as "New Zealander". English was spoken by 97.6%, Māori by 1.4%, Samoan by 0.1%, and other languages by 7.3%. No language could be spoken by 1.7% (e.g. too young to talk). New Zealand Sign Language was known by 0.9%. The percentage of people born overseas was 18.6, compared with 28.8% nationally.

Religious affiliations were 37.4% Christian, 0.1% Islam, 0.1% Māori religious beliefs, 0.5% Buddhist, 0.1% New Age, and 0.9% other religions. People who answered that they had no religion were 55.0%, and 5.6% of people did not answer the census question.

Of those at least 15 years old, 555 (30.6%) people had a bachelor's or higher degree, 996 (55.0%) had a post-high school certificate or diploma, and 258 (14.2%) people exclusively held high school qualifications. The median income was $58,500, compared with $41,500 nationally. 498 people (27.5%) earned over $100,000 compared to 12.1% nationally. The employment status of those at least 15 was 1,032 (57.0%) full-time, 291 (16.1%) part-time, and 27 (1.5%) unemployed.

=== Rural surrounds ===
Halkett is a rural statistical area north of West Melton and south of the Waimakariri River. It covers 86.01 km^{2} (33.21 sq mi). It had an estimated population of 1,760 as of June 2025, with a population density of 20 people per km^{2}.

Newtons Road is a rural statistical area south of West Melton, and north of Burnham Military Camp and Rolleston. It covers 153.83 km^{2} (59.39 sq mi). It had an estimated population of 3,720 as of June 2025, with a population density of 24 people per km^{2}. Newtons Road includes Rolleston Prison.

Historical population for Halkett and Newtons Road
Year	Pop.	±% p.a.
2006	3,891	—
2013	4,857	+3.22%
2018	5,097	+0.97%
2023	5,430	+1.27%
The 2006 population uses a smaller boundary for Newtons Road of 153.14 km^{2}. Source:

Halkett and Newtons Road together had a population of 5,430 in the 2023 New Zealand census, an increase of 333 people (6.5%) since the 2018 census, and an increase of 573 people (11.8%) since the 2013 census. There were 2,919 males, 2,496 females, and 12 people of other genders in 1,830 dwellings. 2.6% of people identified as LGBTIQ+. There were 861 people (15.9%) aged under 15 years, 840 (15.5%) aged 15 to 29, 2,796 (51.5%) aged 30 to 64, and 933 (17.2%) aged 65 or older.

People could identify as more than one ethnicity. The results were 91.9% European (Pākehā); 9.4% Māori; 1.7% Pasifika; 3.5% Asian; 0.7% Middle Eastern, Latin American and African New Zealanders (MELAA); and 3.2% other, which includes people giving their ethnicity as "New Zealander". English was spoken by 97.8%, Māori by 1.8%, Samoan by 0.2%, and other languages by 6.6%. No language could be spoken by 1.3% (e.g. too young to talk). New Zealand Sign Language was known by 0.4%. The percentage of people born overseas was 15.4, compared with 28.8% nationally.

Religious affiliations were 32.7% Christian, 0.3% Islam, 0.3% Māori religious beliefs, 0.5% Buddhist, 0.3% New Age, 0.1% Jewish, and 0.8% other religions. People who answered that they had no religion were 58.1%, and 7.0% of people did not answer the census question.

Of those at least 15 years old, 1,053 (23.0%) people had a bachelor's or higher degree, 2,688 (58.8%) had a post-high school certificate or diploma, and 831 (18.2%) people exclusively held high school qualifications. 753 people (16.5%) earned over $100,000 compared to 12.1% nationally. The employment status of those at least 15 was 2,391 (52.3%) full-time, 828 (18.1%) part-time, and 69 (1.5%) unemployed.

Individual statistical areas
Name	Population	Dwellings	Median age	Median income
West Melton	2,409	798	43.4 years	$58,500
Halkett	1,704	615	48.4 years	$45,800
Newtons Road	3,726	1,215	45.2 years	$42,900
New Zealand			38.1 years	$41,500

== Services ==
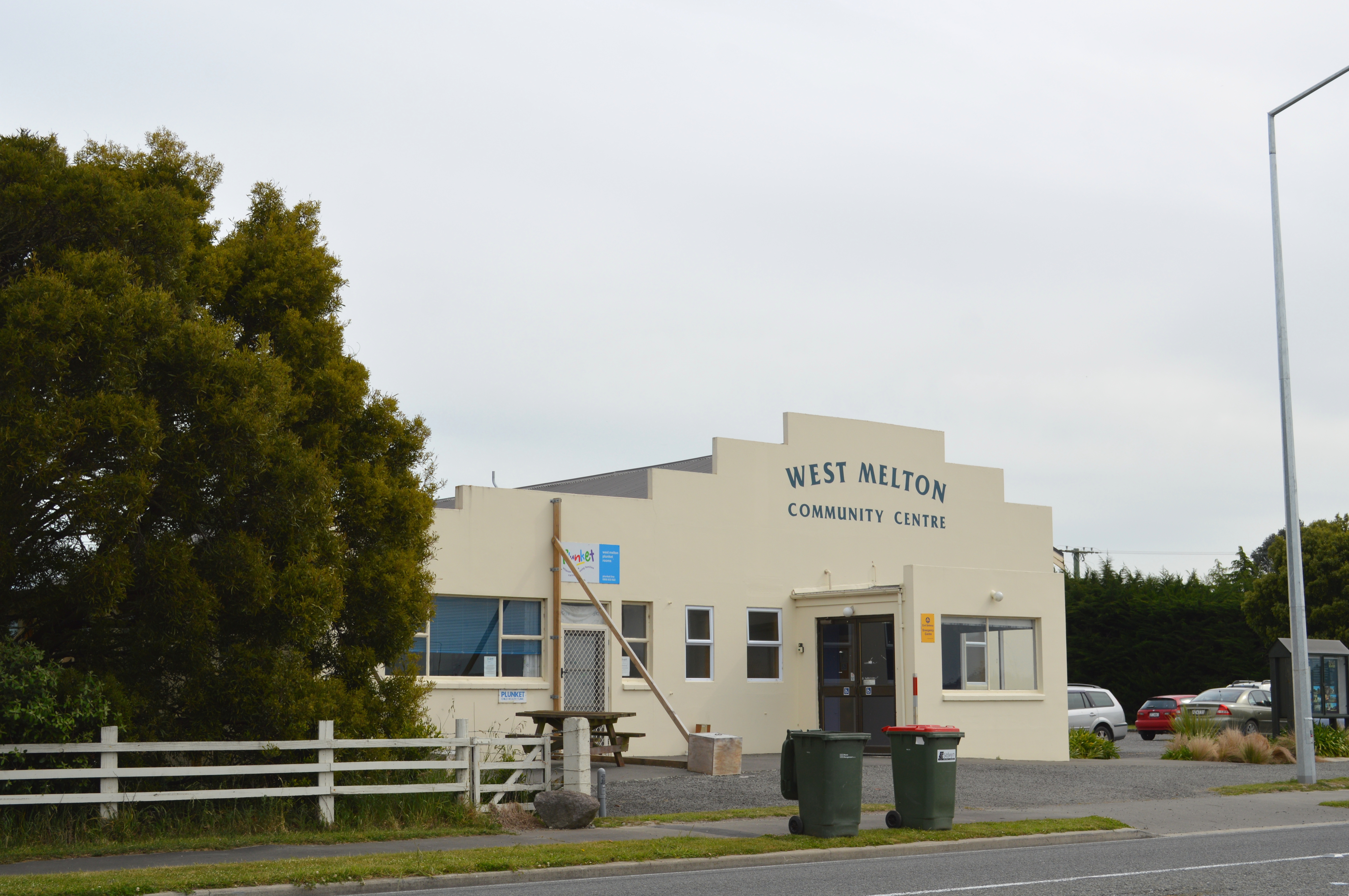
West Melton community centre

West Melton has a shopping precinct including a Four Square supermarket, community centre and a domain, as well as a primary school. West Melton Aerodrome is located in the area, as is the Canterbury Astronomical Society.

A skate park and playground were built next to the community centre. The skate park finished completion in 2022, while the playground was completed in 2023

== Education ==
West Melton School is a full primary school catering for years 1 to 8. It had a roll of 486 as of July 2026. The school opened in 1871.

== Transport ==
=== Bus ===
West Melton is serviced with the 86 bus route, a weekday morning and evening express route that connects Darfield with the Central Christchurch.

=== Road ===
West Melton is accessed by State Highway 73 which pass through the centre of the town. West Melton is also closely linked to the newly built extension of the Christchurch Southern Motorway via Weedons Ross Road Interchange.

On 20 March 2023, West Melton's first set of traffic lights were installed and turned on at the intersection of State Highway 73 and Weedons Ross Road.

== Sport ==
Moore Park Speedway is a motorcycle speedway venue approximately 5 kilometres north of the town. It is located on Weedons Ross Road, adjacent to West Melton airfield. The track is a significant venue for important motorcycle speedway events and has held the final of the New Zealand Solo Championship in 2012, 2015, 2018 and 2021.
