= Coromandel Aerodrome =

- IATA: CMV; ICAO: NZCX

Summary
- Airport type: Private
- Operator: Coromandel Flying Club
- Location: Coromandel, New Zealand
- Elevation AMSL: 13 ft / 4 m
- Coordinates: 36°47′30″S 175°30′31″E
- Interactive map of Coromandel Aerodrome

Runways
Direction	Length		Surface
Direction	ft	m	Surface
12/30	2,043	623	Grass

Coromandel Aerodrome (IATA: CMV, ICAO: NZCX) is a small aerodrome located 2 Nautical Miles (3.7 km) south of Coromandel Township on the Coromandel Peninsula of the North Island of New Zealand.

== Operational information ==
- Runway Strength: ESWL 1270

The aerodrome is operated by the Coromandel Flying Club, and has a 'one way' strip, with landing always on 12 and take-off on 30, except for approved local pilots under unusual weather conditions. The surface is grass and generally usable even in wet weather.

The aerodrome has also been modelled for Microsoft Flight Simulator X.
