= Pauanui Aerodrome =

- IATA: none; ICAO: NZUN

Summary
- Airport type: Private
- Operator: Thames District Council
- Location: Pauanui Beach, Coromandel, New Zealand
- Elevation AMSL: 13 ft (4.0 m)
- Coordinates: 37°01′00″S 175°52′00″E
- Interactive map of Pauanui Aerodrome

Runways
Direction	Length		Surface
Direction	ft	m	Surface
05/23	2,502	782	Grass

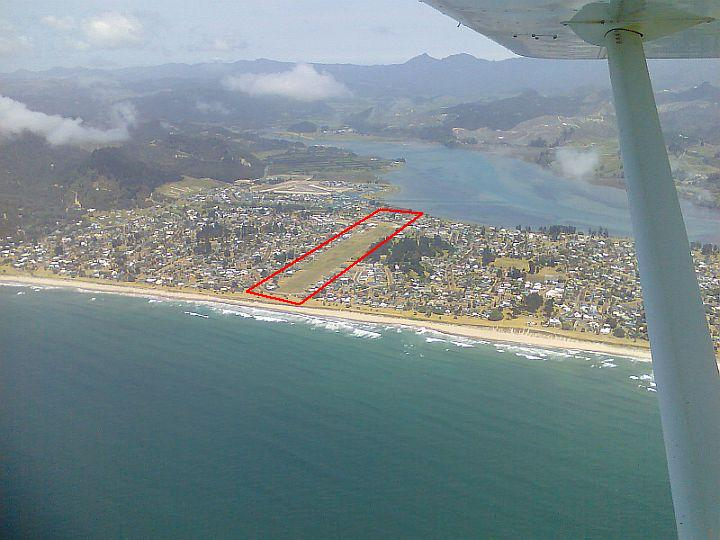
Pauanui Airfield from the East

Pauanui Aerodrome (ICAO: NZUN) is a small aerodrome located in the middle of the Pauanui Beach township on the Coromandel Peninsula of the North Island of New Zealand.

== History ==
The Pauanui airstrip was first constructed in the late 1960s and was considered important by the property developers, the Hopper brothers, both during the development of Pauanui and as a selling point to their future buyers. During the development, the ability to fly to Pauanui would reduce the trip from their offices in Auckland from 3 hours to approximately a 40 minute flight from the North Shore airfield. This meant that the airstrip was one of the first parts developed and both the Hopper brothers gained their Private Pilots Licenses in the late 1960s.

The airstrip was used as a promotional tool to sell properties in the new beach side development from 1968, when the first sections were put up for sale, through to the mid 70s.

Each enquiring customer was given a voucher to view Pauanui from the air.

This voucher was covertly marked with an A, B, or C. A meant the person had purchased a property and got a flight for 10 to 15 minutes over their newly purchased section. B meant they were a serious buyer, and usually given a 10 to 15 minute flight over the area they were considering. C meant they were considered a time waster and given a short, and sometimes, rough flight.

== Operational information ==
The Pauanui Aerodrome is a grass strip. The surface is grass on sand and usable even in wet weather. Runway strength is ESWL 1140 restricted to 910kg in wet conditions. The runway is 23/05. Runway 23 is a right hand circuit. Pauanui does not have fuel or lights. There is a pilot activated AWIB

There is one instrument approach, RNP248 for runway 23.

It is built on a peninsula so the approach for both runway 23 and runway 05 are over water, which means that moderate to severe turbulence and windshear can be expected in certain wind directions.

The aerodrome is unattended, during most of the year the traffic is light, with less than 30 aircraft movements per day. On busy days, especially over Christmas and New Years this can increase to over 120 movements per day.

Landing fees can be paid at the honesty-box at the small unattended "shed" which is located approximately 1/2 down the runway on the southern side. This is where the AWIB equipment is located and there is ample aircraft parking available. There are no set tie downs.

The aerodrome is next to the golf course, and a skatepark on the Tairua approach end. The aerodrome is lined with beach houses, some of which have a hangar as the lower floor and most of which have aircraft tie-down points in the yard.

Pauanui Village centre with cafes and other facilities is a 500m walk to the south west from the eastern-most threshold, or 120m walk from the unattended shed.

There is a surf beach at the eastern end of the runway, and an estuary beach with calmer conditions to the western end.

Summary information is available here.

== Present Day ==
Pauanui is a popular destination for light aircraft flying in for a swim or lunch at the cafes. In the summer it is not uncommon to see aerobatics performed near slipper island by owners of the Yak-52s who visit or own a hanger home on the strip in Pauanui.

== Accidents and incidents ==
Accidents and incidents that occurred at or near Pauanui Aerodrome include:

- 22 October 2011 - A Britten-Norman Trislander abandoned the take-off, but did not manage to stop before the end of the runway. Resulting in minor damage and no injuries to the 13 passengers and crew.
- 9 April 2022 - A Fly Synthesis Storch had a mechanical problem on landing and veered off the runway. There were no injuries to the 2 occupants.
- 25 December 2025 - A Falcomposite Furio, ZK-WBW, veered off the runway whilst attempting to take off and crashed into a house on the side of the airstrip. The house received sustainable damage to the front. St John reported 2 injuries to the occupants of the aircraft, who were taken to Thames Hospital. The Civil Aviation Authority is investigating.
