= Dannevirke Aerodrome =

- IATA: none; ICAO: NZDV

Summary
- Airport type: Private
- Operator: Tararua District Council
- Location: Dannevirke
- Elevation AMSL: 635 ft / 194 m
- Coordinates: 40°13′42″S 176°04′43″E
- Interactive map of Dannevirke Aerodrome

Runways
Direction	Length		Surface
Direction	ft	m	Surface
02/20	3,937	1,200	Grass
08/26	2,283	696	Grass

Dannevirke Aerodrome (IATA: N/A, ICAO: NZDV) is a small airport located 2 nautical miles (3.7 km) south southwest of Dannevirke in the Tararua District in the North Island of New Zealand.

== Operational Information ==
- Runway Strength:
  - 02/20: ESWL 8000
  - 08/26: ESWL 3630
- No runway lighting available
- Circuit Fixed Wing:
  - Runways 20, 26 – Left Hand
  - Runways 02, 08 – Left Hand
- Circuit Helicopters:
  - Runways 02, 08 – Left Hand
  - Runways 20, 26 – Left Hand

== Sources ==
- NZAIP Volume 4 AD
- New Zealand AIP
