= Galatea Aerodrome =

- IATA: none; ICAO: NZGA

Summary
- Airport type: Private
- Operator: Urewera Aero Club
- Location: Murupara
- Elevation AMSL: 550 ft / 168 m
- Coordinates: 38°24′31″S 176°44′31″E
- Interactive map of Galatea Aerodrome

Runways
Direction	Length		Surface
Direction	ft	m	Surface
01/19	3,362	1,025	Grass

Galatea Aerodrome (IATA: N/A, ICAO: NZGA) is a small airfield located 4 Nautical miles (7.4 km) north northeast of Murupara township in the Bay of Plenty in the North Island of New Zealand.

== Operational Information ==
- Runway Strength – ESWL 5700
- No lighting available

== Sources ==
- NZAIP Volume 4 AD
- New Zealand AIP (PDF)
