= Forest Field Aerodrome =

- IATA: none; ICAO: NZFF

Summary
- Airport type: Private
- Operator: C J & P A Collings
- Location: Christchurch
- Elevation AMSL: 402 ft / 123 m
- Coordinates: 43°23′09″S 172°21′38″E
- Interactive map of Forest Field Aerodrome

Runways
Direction	Length		Surface
Direction	m	ft	Surface
05/23	730	2,395	Grass
10/28	750	2,461	Grass
18/36	1,000	3,281	Grass

Forest Field Aerodrome (IATA: N/A, ICAO: NZFF) is a small airport 10 nautical miles (18.5 km) to the northwest of Christchurch International Airport in Canterbury, New Zealand. The aerodrome is a privately operated airport.

== Operational information ==
- No runway lighting
- Runway strength ESWL 9,080
- Circuit: All Runways – left hand
  - Circuit Height: 1,500 ft AMSL

== Sources ==
- NZAIP Volume 4 AD
- New Zealand AIP (PDF)
