= Waihi Beach Aerodrome =

- IATA: none; ICAO: NZWV

Summary
- Airport type: Privately owned, Public Use
- Operator: Double R Waihi
- Location: Waihi Beach, Thames-Coromandel District, New Zealand
- Elevation AMSL: 4 ft / 1 m
- Coordinates: 37°25′48″S 175°57′07″E

Map
- Location of aerodrome in NZ

Runways
Direction	Length		Surface
Direction	ft	m	Surface
13/31	2,100	640	Grass

Waihi Beach Aerodrome (ICAO: NZWV) is a privately owned grass airstrip, one nautical mile to the south of Waihi Beach township in the Thames-Coromandel District of New Zealand
