= West Melton Aerodrome =

Airport in West Melton, New Zealand

- IATA: WML; ICAO: NZWL

Summary
- Owner: Canterbury Aero Club
- Location: West Melton, New Zealand
- Elevation AMSL: 305 ft / 93 m
- Coordinates: 43°28′34″S 172°23′28″E

Map
- Interactive map of West Melton Aerodrome

Runways
Direction	Length		Surface
Direction	ft	m	Surface
04/22	3,271	997	Bitumen/Grass
11/29	2,086	636	Grass
17/35	2,263	690	Grass

West Melton Aerodrome (IATA: WML, ICAO: NZWL) is a small airport located in West Melton, Canterbury, New Zealand. West Melton Aerodrome is located just 6 nautical miles west of Christchurch International Airport. It is owned and operated by the Canterbury Aero Club.
