= Balclutha Aerodrome =

Airport in New Zealand

- IATA: none; ICAO: NZBA

Summary
- Airport type: Private
- Operator: South Otago Aero Club
- Location: Balclutha, New Zealand
- Elevation AMSL: 22 ft / 7 m
- Coordinates: 46°14′36″S 169°45′00″E
- Interactive map of Balclutha Aerodrome

Runways
Direction	Length		Surface
Direction	ft	m	Surface
07/25	2,185	666	Grass

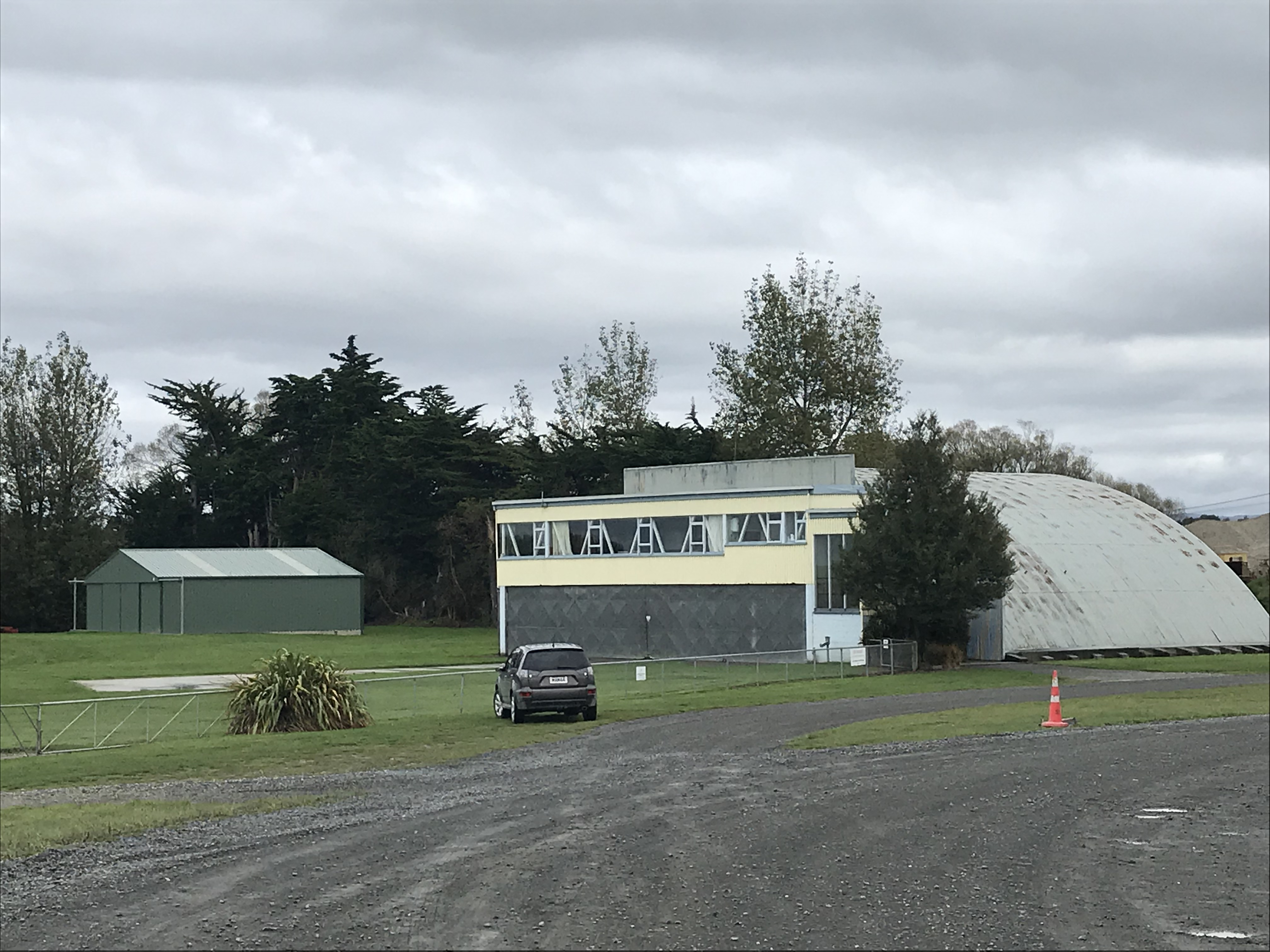
Balclutha Aerodrome

Balclutha Aerodrome (IATA: N/A, ICAO: NZBA) is a small airport 0.5 Nautical Miles (1 km) southeast of Balclutha township on the east coast of the South Island, New Zealand.

The aerodrome is operated by and is home to the South Otago Aero Club. The aerodrome is popular with model aircraft enthusiasts and glider pilots.

Operational information:

- Airfield elevation is 22 ft AMSL
- Runway 07/25, 666 x 91 meters grass
- No Runway lighting available
- Surface strength ESWL 820
- Circuit: RWY 07 – right hand; RWY 25 – left hand
- Circuit Height: 1000 ft AMSL

== Sources ==
NZAIP Volume 4 AD

- AIP New Zealand (PDF)
