= Gore Aerodrome =

- IATA: none; ICAO: NZGC

Summary
- Airport type: Public
- Operator: Gore District Council
- Location: Gore, New Zealand
- Elevation AMSL: 198 ft / 60 m
- Coordinates: 46°09′24″S 168°53′54″E
- Interactive map of Gore Aerodrome

Runways
Direction	Length		Surface
Direction	ft	m	Surface
01/19	4,206	1,282	Grass topped compacted clay/soil
06/24	2,031	619	Grass
12/30	1,765	538	Grass

Gore Airport (IATA: N/A, ICAO: NZGC), also known as Charlton Aerodrome, is an aerodrome between Gore and Mataura in New Zealand. It is 3.5 miles South West of Gore on SH1.

== Operational information ==
- Circuits left hand all runways.
- BP avgas 100 swipecard. Jet A1 available on request.
- No landing fees.
- The aerodrome is home to Phoenix Aviation whose main business is aerial crop dressing.
