= West Auckland Airport =

West Auckland Airport Parakai
- IATA: none; ICAO: NZPI

Summary
- Airport type: Public
- Operator: West Auckland Airport Company Ltd
- Location: Auckland
- Elevation AMSL: 6 ft / 2 m
- Coordinates: 36°39′06″S 174°26′00″E
- Website: WestAucklandAirport.co.nz
- Interactive map of West Auckland Airport Parakai

Runways
Direction	Length		Surface
Direction	ft	m	Surface
07/25	2,804	900	Bitumen 760m, plus a Grass on Limestone extension 140m.

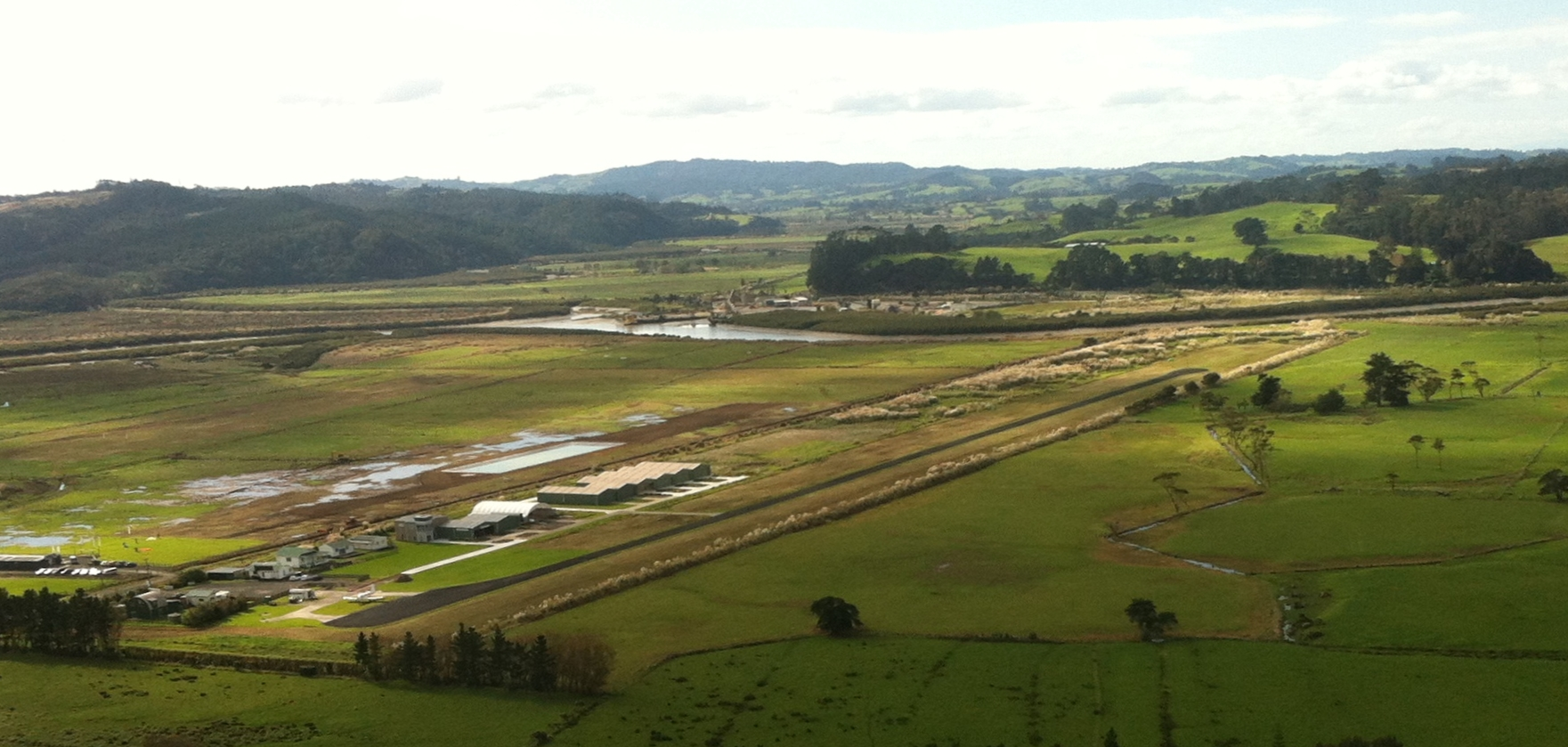
West Auckland Airport Parakai from the South West

West Auckland Airport Parakai (ICAO: NZPI) West Auckland Airport is a general aviation (GA) airport on the North Western edge of Auckland, New Zealand. It is close to the town of Parakai and 2 nautical miles (3.8 km) northwest of Helensville at the southern end of the Kaipara Harbour. The Airport is operated by West Auckland Airport Company Ltd, under 'Airport Authority' status.

== History ==
The Helensville Aero Club operated from Helensville Airfield from the 1940s, moving to Parakai and renaming the airfield as Parakai Airfield (Parakai Aerodrome) during the 1960s. Starting with a grass surface, the runway was realigned and built up with limestone during the 1980s to make it usable all year round, and the surface gradually improved. Services provided: Flight training by various clubs and flying schools, taking students up to Commercial Pilot Licence (CPL) level. Commercial flights to Great Barrier Island. Private aircraft hangarage. Intensive Skydiving operations built up from 1986 and in 2003 and 2013 the NZ Skydiving Championships were held at the airfield. From 2013 onwards many NZ Skydive Championships have been held at the Airport.

On 17 February 2020, an 'Order in Council' was passed designating West Auckland Airport Company Ltd an 'Airport Authority' under the 'Airport Authorities Act 1966', which came into effect on 1 April 2020.

== Present day ==
West Auckland Airport is one of three GA airports serving light aircraft in Auckland, along with Ardmore Airport to the south east and North Shore Airfield to the north east of the city.

The Airport is working towards becoming a secondary regional Airport to provide domestic flights for the 400,000 Auckland residents for whom it is the nearest airport. The location allows for major development without displacing any houses or the existing light aircraft runway.

Flight Instructors provide flight training from ab initio through to the Microlight Advanced National Pilot Certificate in 3-axis Tecnam aircraft. All training aircraft are dual control and two of them have BRS 'whole aircraft' parachutes installed.

The airport is base for Leading Edge Aviation Ltd aircraft engineers (the Southern Hemisphere repack Station for BRS Ballistic parachutes), Skydive Auckland, three flight training organisations, and the 'Aimm' Airport Movement Management System.

Most fixed-base operator (FBO) services are available including fuel Avgas and Mogas. Hangarage for private aircraft is often available in the 16 privately owned and FBO hangars. Space is available for building of private hangars. Being an 'Airport Authority' allows considerable flexibility of usage for non-Aviation industries, so long as the activity does not conflict with Airport operations.

== Operational information ==
- Airport elevation is 6 ft AMSL
- Runway 07/25 is 760m of Bitumen and a 140m all weather extension with grass on limestone, for a total length of 900m. On takeoff or go-around, all aircraft, including rotorcraft, must remain over the centreline of the runway and below 500 ft until well past the ends of the runway to maintain separation from parachutes.
- Taxiways: There are concrete taxiways to all permanent hangars.
- Circuit: RWY 07 – left hand; RWY 25 – right hand
- Circuit height: 1000 ft AMSL, all circuits to the north. Due to frequent skydiving, aircraft must join downwind, base or final (NOT overhead) and fly a wide circuit.

The airport is uncontrolled with mandatory radio calls on 123.5 within 10 nm of the airport.

By road West Auckland Airport is 34 minutes from the Auckland CBD and 30 minutes from Silverdale.

== Sources ==
- NZAIP Volume 4 AD
- New Zealand AIP (PDF)
