= Cromwell Racecourse Aerodrome =

- IATA: none; ICAO: NZCS

Summary
- Airport type: Private
- Operator: Central Otago District Council
- Location: Cromwell, New Zealand
- Elevation AMSL: 745 ft / 227 m
- Coordinates: 45°02′55″S 169°10′14″E
- Interactive map of Cromwell Racecourse Aerodrome

Runways
Direction	Length		Surface
Direction	ft	m	Surface
09/27	2,723	830	Grass
18/36	3,346	1,020	Grass

Cromwell Racecourse Aerodrome (IATA: N/A, ICAO: NZCS) is a small airport 1 Nautical Mile (1.9 km) to the west of Cromwell township in Central Otago in the South Island of New Zealand. The aerodrome is located on the boundary of the Cromwell Racecourse which is used for horse racing and adjacent to Cromwell Hospital.

Operational information:

- No runway lighting
- Runway strength ESWL 3630
- Circuit: RWY 36 – right hand RWY 18/27 – left hand
  - Circuit Height: 1800 ft AMSL
- Runway 09: Landing Prohibited
- Runway 27: Take-off prohibited

== Sources ==
- NZAIP Volume 4 AD
- New Zealand AIP
