= Haast Aerodrome =

- IATA: none; ICAO: NZHT

Summary
- Airport type: Private
- Operator: Heliventures Ltd
- Location: Haast, New Zealand
- Elevation AMSL: 22 ft / 7 m
- Coordinates: 43°52′00″S 169°02′25″E
- Interactive map of Haast Aerodrome

Runways
Direction	Length		Surface
Direction	ft	m	Surface
16/34	2,297	700	Gravel

Haast Aerodrome, (IATA: N/A, ICAO: NZHT) is an aerodrome 1 mile (1.6 km) north of Haast in New Zealand.

== Operational Information ==
- Circuit: RWY16 Right hand, RWY34 Left hand
- FAL: Z Avgas swipecard
- Commercial Activities not permitted

== Sources ==
- NZAIP Volume 4 AD
- New Zealand AIP (PDF)
