= Motueka Aerodrome =

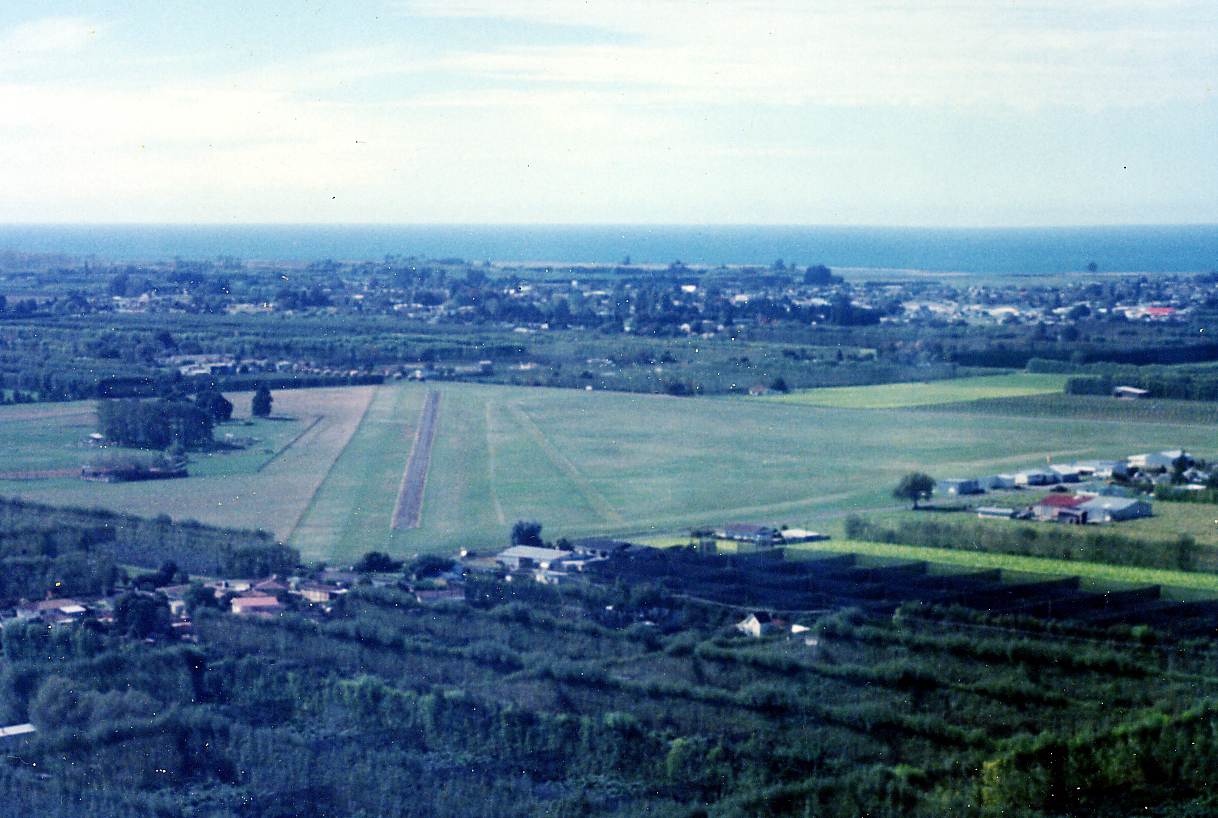
- Motueka Aerodrome
- IATA: MZP; ICAO: NZMK

Summary
- Airport type: Public
- Owner: Tasman District Council
- Operator: Tasman District Council
- Serves: Motueka
- Location: Motueka
- Elevation AMSL: 38 ft (12 m)
- Coordinates: 41°7′24″S 172°59′38″E
- Interactive map of Motueka Aerodrome

Runways
| Direction | Length | | Surface |
| Direction | ft | m | Surface |
|---|---|---|---|
| 02/20 | 2,391 | 729 | Asphalt |

Motueka Aerodrome (IATA: MZP, ICAO: NZMK) is the airport serving Motueka, New Zealand, and is owned and managed by Tasman District Council.

The current runway is 729 metres long and 11 metres wide with an asphalt surface. This is an adequate length to operate Piper Navajo aircraft. The aerodrome has no control tower, but hangars and refuelling facilities are available.

The following companies operate from Motueka Aerodrome:

- Blue Sky Microlight
- Motueka Aero Club
- Nelson Aviation College
- Skydive Abel Tasman
- Nelson Tasman Air

The runway at Motueka Aerdrome is often used by the Nelson Drag Racing Association for drag racing events. In 1984, Motueka Air started scheduled passenger flights from Motueka to Wellington, New Zealand using a Piper Aztec aircraft. Within a couple of years, the Motueka Air network had grown to include Nelson, Wellington and Palmerston North using additional Piper Chieftains. In 1988, Motueka Air was renamed Air Nelson and relocated to Nelson Airport.
