= List of airlines of New Zealand =

This is a list of airlines that have an Air Operator Certificate issued by the Civil Aviation Authority of New Zealand.

== Scheduled airlines ==
Airline	Image	IATA	ICAO	Callsign	Base	Notes
Air Chathams		3C	CVA	CHATHAM	Chatham Islands / Tuuta Airport	
Air New Zealand		NZ	ANZ	NEW ZEALAND	Auckland Airport	The flag carrier and national airline of New Zealand.
Barrier Air			GBA	BARRIER	Auckland Airport	
Golden Bay Air		G1	GBY	GOLDEN BAY	Takaka Aerodrome	
Originair		OG	OGN	ORIGIN	Nelson Airport	
Sounds Air		S8	SDA	SOUNDSAIR	Picton Aerodrome	
Stewart Island Flights		WK	RKU	RAKIURA	Invercargill Airport	
Sunair		ZU	SAV	SUNAIR	Tauranga Airport	

== Charter airlines ==
Airline	Image	IATA	ICAO	Callsign	Base	Notes
Air Safaris			SRI	AIRSAFARI	Lake Tekapo Airport	
Airwork			AWK	AIRWORK	Auckland Airport	
Glenorchy Air					Queenstown Airport	
Air Kaikoura					Kaikoura Airport	
Air Napier					Hawke's Bay Airport	
Salt Air					North Shore Aerodrome	

== Cargo airlines ==
Airline	Image	IATA	ICAO	Callsign	Base	Notes
Parcelair		P4	APK	AIRPAK	Palmerston North Airport	Owned by Freightways and Airwork.
Texel Air		TT	TNZ	TEXEL	Auckland Airport	Subsidiary of Bahrain-based cargo airline Texel Air.

== See also ==
- List of defunct airlines of New Zealand
- List of airlines
- List of general aviation operators of New Zealand
