= List of airlines of Tonga =

This is a list of airlines of Tonga.

== Active ==
Airline	Image	IATA	ICAO	Callsign	Commenced operations	Notes
Lulutai Airlines		L8	TON	TONGA	2020	

== Defunct ==
Airline	Image	IATA	ICAO	Callsign	Commenced operations	Ceased operations	Notes
Airlines Tonga					2005	2008	
Chathams Pacific		CP			2008	2013	Subsidiary of Air Chathams
Fly Niu Airlines					2004	2004	
Friendly Island Airways		WR	HRH		1984	1991	Renamed/merged to Royal Tongan Airlines
Peau Vavaʻu		3O	PVU	PEAU	2004	2009	
Royal Tongan Airlines		WR	HRH	TONGA ROYAL	1991	2004	
Real Tonga		R4	RLT	REAL TONGA	2013	2020	

== See also ==
- List of airports in Tonga
- List of defunct airlines of Oceania
