= List of airports in Tonga =

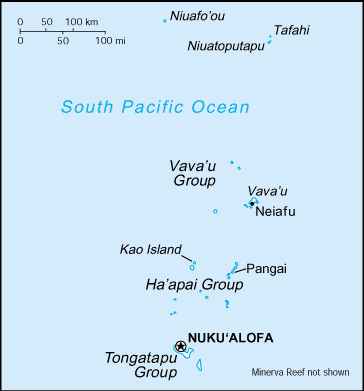
Map of Tonga

This is a list of airports in Tonga, sorted by location.

Tonga, officially the Kingdom of Tonga, is an archipelago in the South Pacific Ocean, consisting of 169 islands, 36 of them inhabited. The Kingdom stretches over a distance of about 800 kilometres (500 mi) in a north–south line. The islands that constitute the archipelago lie south of Samoa, about one-third of the way from New Zealand to Hawaiʻi.

== Airports ==
Location served	ICAO	IATA	Airport name	Coordinates
ʻEua	NFTE	EUA	ʻEua Airport (Kaufana Airport)	21°23′S 174°57′W
Lifuka, Haʻapai	NFTL	HPA	Lifuka Island Airport (Salote Pilolevu Airport)	19°46′36″S 174°20′28″W
Niuafoʻou	NFTO	NFO	Niuafoʻou Airport (Kuini Lavinia Airport)	15°34′16″S 175°37′51″W
Niuatoputapu	NFTP	NTT	Niuatoputapu Airport (Mata'aho Airport)	15°58′36″S 173°45′18″W
Tongatapu	NFTF	TBU	Fuaʻamotu International Airport	21°14′28″S 175°08′58″W
Vavaʻu	NFTV	VAV	Vavaʻu International Airport (Lupepauʻu Airport)	18°35′07″S 173°57′42″W

== See also ==
- Transport in Tonga
- List of airports by ICAO code: N#NF - Fiji, Tonga
- Wikipedia:WikiProject Aviation/Airline destination lists: Oceania#Tonga
