= Real Tonga =

Airline of Tonga (2013–2020)

IATA	ICAO	Call sign
R4	RLT	REAL TONGA
- Founded: 4 March 2013
- Ceased operations: 27 May 2020
- Hubs: Fuaʻamotu International Airport
- Fleet size: 1
- Destinations: 6
- Headquarters: Nuku’alofa, Tonga
- Key people: Tevita Palu (CEO)
- Website: www.realtonga.to

Real Tonga, stylised as REALtonga, was an airline that operated domestic flights within the Pacific island-country of Tonga. It commenced operations in March 2013, becoming the twelfth airline to operate domestic flights in Tonga since air services began there. In 2020 the airline ceased all operations.

== History ==
Real Tonga commenced operations on 4 March 2013, taking over services previously operated by Chathams Pacific, a subsidiary of New Zealand-based airline Air Chathams. The airline was started up with funding from the owner Tevita Palu, as well as the gifting of several aircraft from China to the Tongan government, including a Xian MA60, which were then leased to Real Tonga.

The use of the MA60 generated controversy in both Tonga and New Zealand due to the type's safety record, and the New Zealand government issued a travel advisory, warning against air travel in Tonga. As a result of this, tourist numbers dropped, particularly on the outer islands, where the reduction in the number of tourists had a significant impact on the local economy.

In June 2014, Real Tonga announced that it had purchased two British Aerospace Jetstream 32 aircraft from Australia.

On 12 May 2020 Real Tonga was not operating after the MA60 lease was terminated, the Y-12 lease expired and the Saab 340 was out of service after a birdstrike incident. This occurred amid issues related to the COVID-19 pandemic, including the laying off of staff and pilots.

Two weeks later, on 27 May, the Tongan government announced they were cutting support for Real Tonga in favour of a new airline to be called Lulutai Airlines. It was reported that the airline had been running at a loss for seven years since its inception in 2013. This would make the Real Tonga the fifth Tongan domestic operator to cease operations since Royal Tongan Airlines collapsed in 2004. (See also: List of defunct airlines of Tonga).

== Safety record ==
Attempts were made to verify that the MA60 flown by Real Tonga was safe. Pilot Rodger McCutcheon said the MA60 is an excellent airplane. Ex-Air New Zealand pilots with over 15000 flight hours offered to re-certify the plane. The chief executive of Samoa Air added that he didn't believe the MA60 aircraft, gifted to Tonga by China, is a significant safety issue.

However, on March 6 of 2015, the airline decided to ground and return the MA60 turboprop, due to pressure from the New Zealand government. By doing this, the Pacific island nation triggered a release of NZ$10 million in aid to it. A 68-seater ATR 72-600 was leased from Fiji Airways to operate a number of charter flights.

== Destinations ==
Destination	IATA	ICAO	Airport
'Eua	EUA	NFTE	'Eua Airport
Ha'apai	HPA	NFTL	Salote Pilolevu Airport
Niuafo'ou	NFO	NFTO	Niuafoʻou Airport
Niuatoputapu	NTT	NFTP	Niuatoputapu Airport
Tongatapu	TBU	NFTF	Fuaʻamotu International Airport ^{[base]}
Vava'u	VAV	NFTV	Vava'u International Airport

== Fleet ==
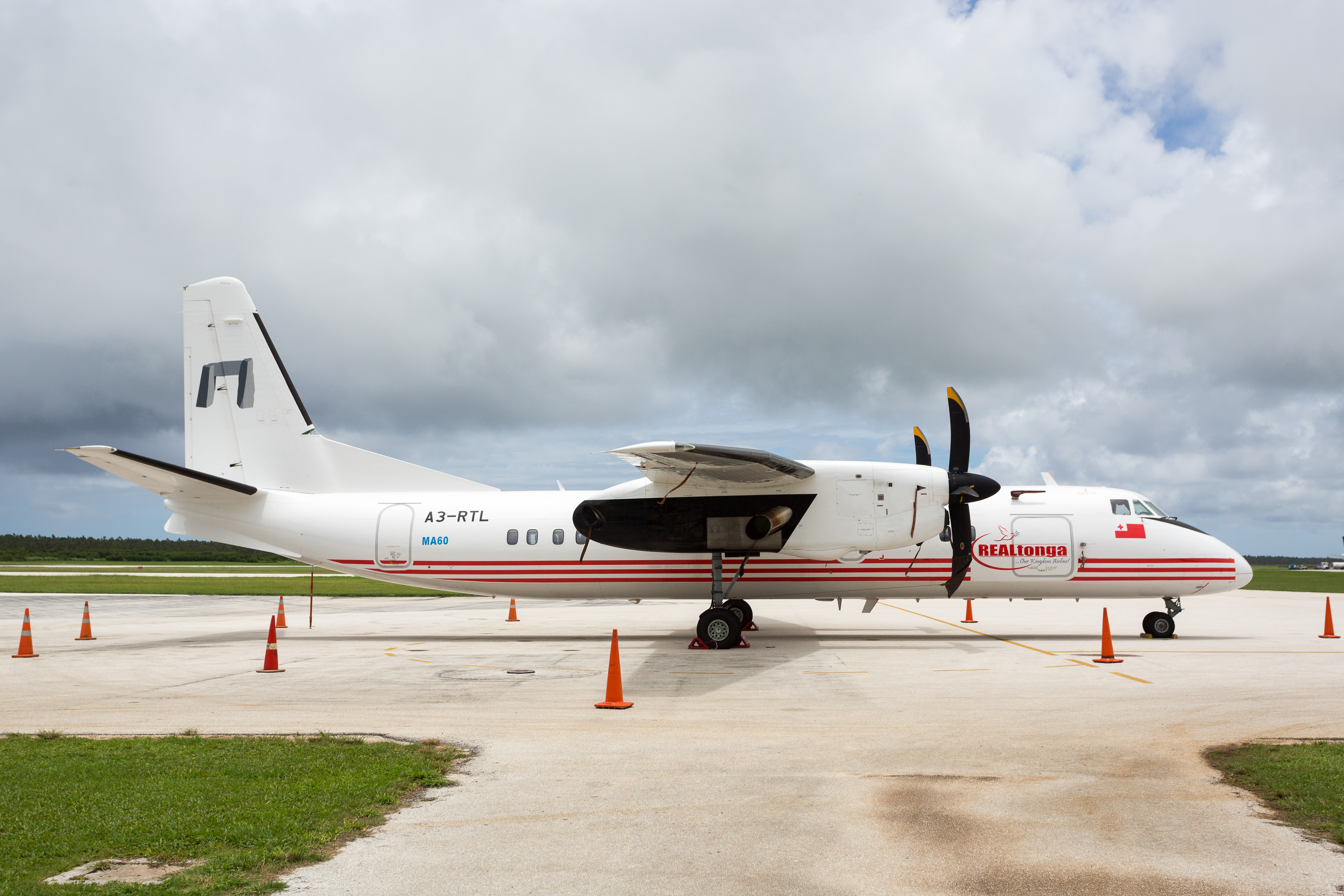
REALtonga's Xian MA60 at Fuaʻamotu International Airport

The Real Tonga fleet comprised the following aircraft (as of August 2016):

Real Tonga fleet
Aircraft	In fleet	Orders	Passengers	Notes
Saab 340B Plus	1	—	32	
Total	1			

== See also ==
- Royal Tongan Airlines
