= Royal Tongan Airlines =

National airline of Tonga (1985–2004)

IATA	ICAO	Call sign
WR	HRH	TONGA ROYAL
- Founded: 1985
- Ceased operations: 18 May 2004
- Hubs: Fuaʻamotu International Airport
- Fleet size: 2
- Destinations: 12
- Parent company: Government of Tonga
- Headquarters: Royco Building, Nukuʻalofa, Tonga
- Employees: 100

Royal Tongan Airlines was the national airline of Tonga operated from 1985 until liquidation in 2004. It was a government agency and operated interisland services and international routes.

== History ==
=== Formative years ===
In 1983 a feasibility study was undertaken by All Nippon Airways to investigate the setting up of a Tongan airline. It was planned for Friendly Island Airways to begin operations in October 1984, with technical and managerial assistance provided by the Japanese airline, and for the airline to operate a surplus ANA Boeing 737-200. The plan was dropped in favour of Tongan participation in Air Nauru, which was expected to take delivery of a third Fokker F28 and was also expected to extend the Nauru-Apia route to Tonga. At the time, flights between Apia and Tonga were operated exclusively by Polynesian Airlines.

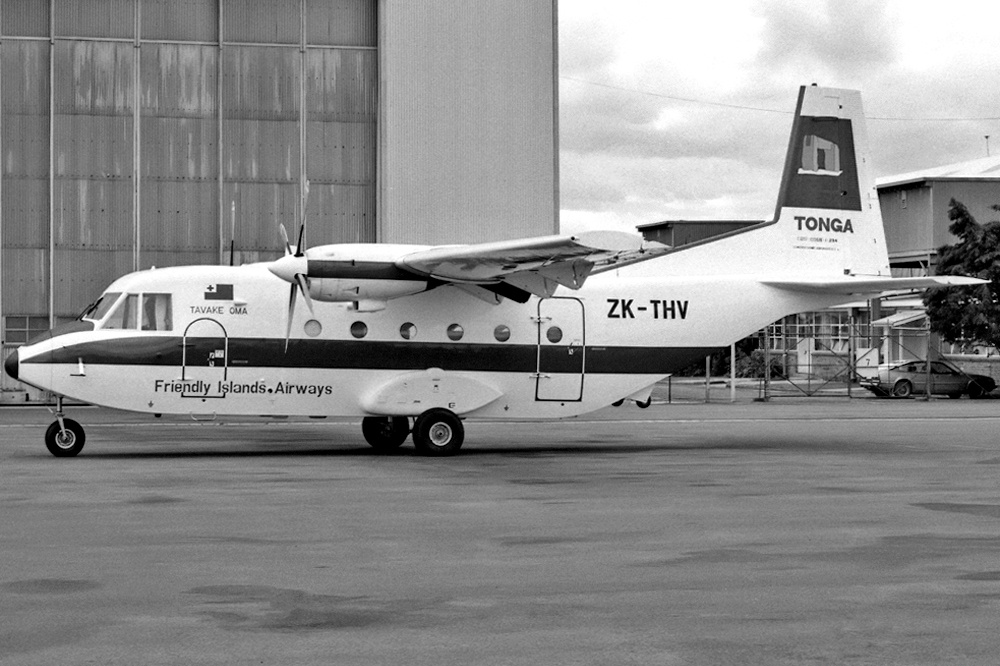
Friendly Island Airways CASA 212 at Essendon Airport (1986)

In 1985, King of Tonga Taufa'ahau Tupou IV visited the British Aerospace factory in Woodford, leading to hopes with the manufacturer that Tonga would purchase the British Aerospace ATP. However, the government of Tonga and the Tonga Commodities Board purchased a CASA 212 and Britten Norman Islander with which domestic flights could be started. Flights to Pago Pago (American Samoa) and Apia (Western Samoa) were begun with the CASA in 1986. As airfields in Vavaʻu, Haʻapai, ʻEua and the Niuas were upgraded, the airline upgraded the inter-island aircraft. In 1989 the airline leased two de Havilland Canada DHC-6 Twin Otters to replace the CASA and Islander, and after the initial lease period, purchased the aircraft from the lessor, Guinness Peat Aviation. In June 1991, the name was changed from Friendly Island Airways to Royal Tongan Airlines, and international services were begun with a Boeing 737-200 which was leased from Solomon Airlines from Tongatapu to Auckland, New Zealand. The airline was considering acquiring a Douglas DC-8 in order to operate flights to Australia, New Zealand and Honolulu, however this didn't eventuate and in 1994 the airline entered into a codeshare agreement with Polynesian Airlines on routes to Sydney, Honolulu and Los Angeles.

In June 1995, an agreement was signed with Air Pacific, which saw the lease-sharing of a Boeing 737-300 operated on Royal Tongan routes. The airline also gained approval from the Australian government to carry passengers on its Sydney-Auckland-Tonga route. In 1996 the airline opened an office in Honolulu, and began codesharing on Air New Zealand flights from Tongatapu to the Hawaiian capital. On 28 October 1997, a codeshare agreement with Polynesian Airlines was begun. The agreement signed in early October 1997, saw Polynesian Airlines extending its Apia-Wellington-Melbourne flights to operate Apia-Tonga-Wellington-Melbourne. The agreement was a continuation of efforts by airlines in the South Pacific to pool their limited resources to maximise their services. By 1998, at the age of 37, Silva McLeod, Tonga's first woman pilot, was working full time as a captain for them.

Direct flights between Tongatapu and Sydney were announced in April 1999 as part of a Tongan initiative to increase tourist numbers from Australia. The once-weekly flights, the first by a Tongan airline to Australia, were operated by a chartered Air Pacific Boeing 737.

=== International expansion ===
A delegation from the government of Niue travelled to Tonga to try to persuade Royal Tongan to continue flying to Niue from Tonga past 28 October 2002; that date on which the flights were to cease, and Polynesian Airlines would begin jet service to Auckland. Royal Tongan told the Niuean government that it could no longer justify the service.

In 2002, the airline leased a Boeing 757 from Royal Brunei Airlines in order to restart international flights. The deal saw the aircraft being leased for a period of five years, initially as a wet lease later to be changed to a dry lease. Prince Tuʻipelehake, and a majority of Tongan MPs, opposed the government giving Royal Tongan financial support with public funds due to the high levels of debt the airline was already in.

Royal Tongan service of the 757, nicknamed 'Ikale Tahi, was inaugurated at Fuaʻamotu International Airport on 23 November 2002, with thrice-weekly flights from Tongatapu to Auckland, with a once-a-week extension to Sydney. In 2003 it obtained its own air operator's certificate with a view to launching flights to Honolulu. On 19 December, the airline was due to launch a once-weekly direct flight from Tongatapu to Honolulu, marking the entry of the airline in the American market.

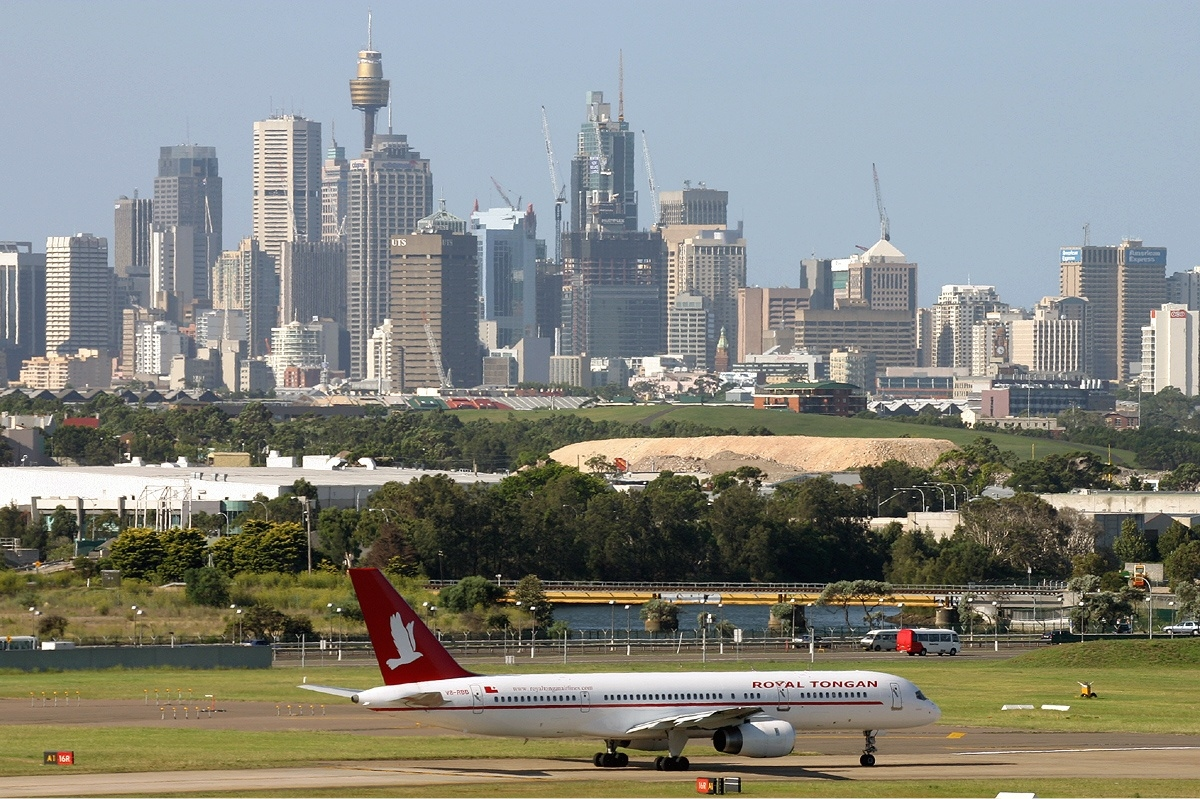
Royal Tongan Boeing 757-200 at Sydney Airport (2004).

The Director of the Tongan Human Rights and Democracy Movement claimed the restructuring of the airline suffered from a lack of transparency. Lopeti Senituli noted that Tongan Prime Minister Prince ʻUlukālala Lavaka Ata wrote to the board of Royal Tongan Airline and instructed them to resign. At the same time, he noted that Shoreline, a company owned by the prince, had expressed an interest in taking over the airline.

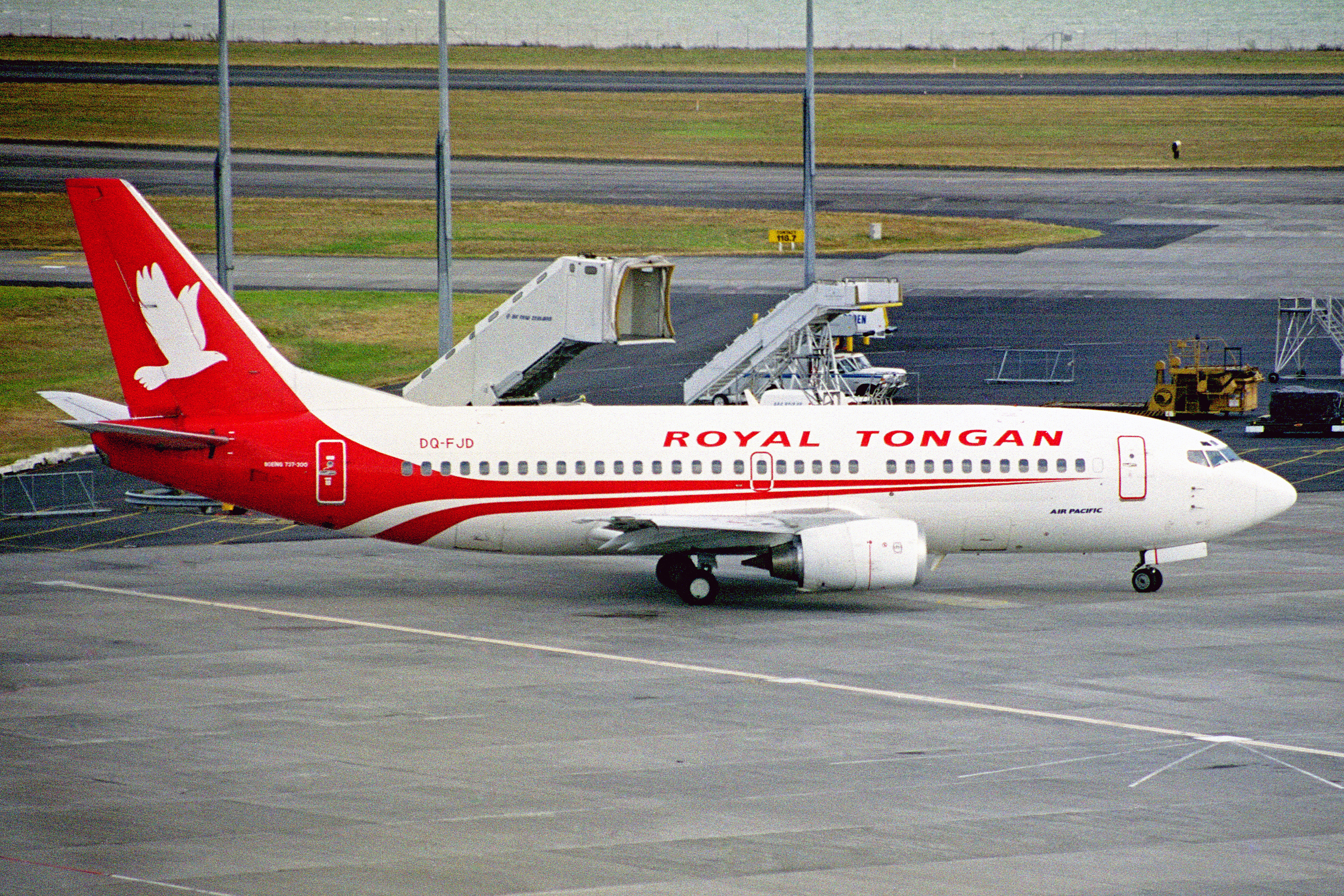
A Royal Tongan Boeing 737-300 leased from Air Pacific

The airline commissioned KPMG to review the airline's financial position, and in November 2003 the report by the accounting firm concluded that the airline was nearly insolvent and that too few passengers were flying on the airline's international routes. The review found that Royal Tongan had lost US$5.5 million in the first nine months of its international operations. It was also determined that whilst Royal Tongan expected a 65% load factor on these flights, the actual figure was closer to 34%. In dismissing KPMG's review, CEO Logan Appu, stated that the airline would continue to operate internationally, and confirmed that the airline would begin flights to Honolulu in December 2003, in spite of the report recommending that Royal Tongan ditch the international flights and concentrate only on domestic services. People's Representative Feleti Sevele noted that report suggested that the government would need to inject US$10 million into the airline, whilst the entire Tongan budget is only US$50 million.

The introduction of flights by Royal Tongan to Rarotonga sparked a price war with Air New Zealand. Five night packages to Rarotonga before Royal Tongan entered the scene cost approximately NZ$1299, and after the airline entered the market prices dropped to NZ$829–$899 for seven night packages.

=== Towards liquidation ===
The airline stopped selling international flights on 23 April 2004, and announced that the last international flight would leave Tongatapu for Auckland the following day, whereby the Boeing 757 was repossessed for non-payment and returned to Royal Brunei Airlines. Whilst airline management provided no reasons for the cessation of international flights, it was believed to be linked to the funding crisis which was being experienced by the state-owned airline. After the closure, Tonga was reliant on Air New Zealand, Air Pacific, Air Fiji and Polynesian Airlines for international air services. The cessation of international flights also had the side effect of stranding mail being sent to Tonga in Auckland, up to a month afterwards, due to limited cargo space being available on the Air New Zealand flights to the nation, and in late May it was reported that the nation had not received mail for a week.

Akilisi Pohiva, a pro-democracy member of Tonga's parliament blamed King Taufa'ahau Tupou IV for the financial crisis of the airline, and called on the king to use his own funds to bail Royal Tongan out of its financial woes. He noted that the Tupou had issued a royal decree for the 757 project to proceed, despite opposition from the cabinet and parliament, and claimed that the monarchy is not accountable to the public.

On 18 May 2004, the airline ceased all operations with the remaining one hundred employees losing their jobs, and the islands of Tonga being left without domestic air service. The closure was forced as the airline's only airworthy aircraft, the Shorts 360, broke down and the airline had no funds with which to repair it. Airline administration was hoping that the government would bail it out, but this did not eventuate.

In discussing the sending of Australian and New Zealand specialists to Tonga, to help the government wind up the airline, Phil Goff, the New Zealand Minister of Foreign Affairs stated "lessons can be learned from how and why the RTA collapsed." The Tongan government confirmed that it had a financial commitment in the airline to the value of 14 million Tongan paʻanga, and had pumped some 20 million paʻanga into the airline since its inception in 1985.

In July 2004 PricewaterhouseCoopers found that the only substantial remaining assets of the company were a hangar and the two aircraft. It recommended that the aircraft be repaired and sold. By December 2004, it was reported that creditors had lodged claims of US$8.5 million from the liquidators, but had recovered only US$1.13 million from the sale of assets. PricewaterCoopers also noted that only 106 of 206 former employees of the airline had thus far lodged claims. The Twin Otter was sold in January 2005 for US$850,000, and the sale of assets from the airline's offices in Nukuʻalofa and abroad netted US$71,000 and US$8,000 respectively.

In the absence of domestic flights in Tonga, by June 2004 Air Waves of Vava'u and Fly Niu Airlines had begun operations on some of the former Royal Tongan routes.

== Destinations ==
Royal Tongan mainly operated domestic flights linking all the major islands the capital Nukuʻalofa. The airline also operated a number of international destinations, linking Nukuʻalofa to some 6 international points.

City	Country	Airport
ʻEua	Tonga	ʻEua Airport
Apia	Samoa	Faleolo International Airport
Auckland	New Zealand	Auckland Airport
Haʻapai	Tonga	Lifuka Island Airport
Honolulu	United States	Daniel K. Inouye International Airport
Nadi	Fiji	Nadi International Airport
Niuafoʻou	Tonga	Niuafoʻou Airport
Niuatoputapu	Tonga	Niuatoputapu Airport
Nukuʻalofa	Tonga	Fuaʻamotu International Airport - Hub
Rarotonga	Cook Islands	Rarotonga International Airport
Sydney	Australia	Sydney Airport
Vavaʻu	Tonga	Vavaʻu International Airport

== Fleet ==
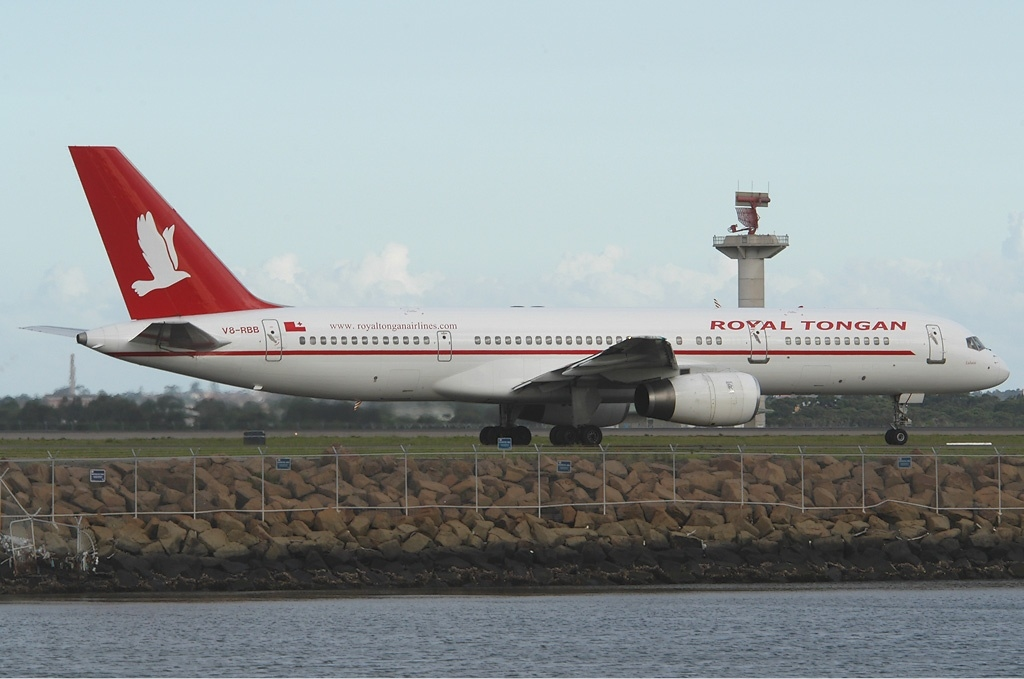
A Royal Tongan Airlines Boeing 757-200 at Sydney

As of its closure the Royal Tongan Airlines fleet included:

Royal Tongan Airlines Fleet
Aircraft	In service	Future	Passengers	Notes
Boeing 757-200	1	0	200	Leased from Royal Brunei Airlines
Boeing 737-200	1	0	115	

=== Former fleet ===
- CASA 212
- Britten Norman Islander
- de Havilland Canada DHC-6 Twin Otter
- Boeing 737-300
- Boeing 767-200
- Hawker Siddeley HS-748
