= List of Fiji Airways destinations =

As of December 2025, Fiji Airways operates scheduled services to 28 international destinations in 15 countries, including charter destinations. This list does not include destinations served by subsidiary Fiji Link.

== List ==
Country	City/territory	airport	Notes	Ref.
Australia	Adelaide	Adelaide Airport		
Australia	Brisbane	Brisbane Airport		
Australia	Cairns	Cairns Airport		
Australia	Canberra	Canberra Airport	Ends February 5, 2027	
Australia	Gold Coast	Gold Coast Airport		
Australia	Melbourne	Melbourne Airport		
Australia	Sydney	Sydney Airport		
Canada	Vancouver	Vancouver International Airport		
China	Beijing	Beijing Capital International Airport	Seasonal charter	
China	Hangzhou	Hangzhou Xiaoshan International Airport	Seasonal charter	
China	Hong Kong	Hong Kong International Airport		
China	Shanghai	Shanghai Pudong International Airport	Seasonal charter	
Fiji	Nadi	Nadi International Airport	Hub	
Fiji	Suva	Nausori International Airport	Secondary hub	
France	New Caledonia, Nouméa	La Tontouta International Airport	Terminated	
Japan	Tokyo	Narita International Airport		
Kiribati	Kiritimati	Cassidy International Airport		
Kiribati	Tarawa	Bonriki International Airport		
New Zealand	Auckland	Auckland Airport		
New Zealand	Christchurch	Christchurch Airport		
New Zealand	Wellington	Wellington Airport		
Papua New Guinea	Port Moresby	Port Moresby International Airport	Terminated	
Samoa	Apia	Faleolo Airport		
Singapore	Singapore	Changi Airport		
Solomon Islands	Honiara	Honiara International Airport		
Taiwan	Taipei	Taoyuan International Airport	Seasonal charter	
Tonga	Neiafu	Vavaʻu International Airport		
Tonga	Nukuʻalofa	Fuaʻamotu Airport		
Tuvalu	Funafuti	Funafuti International Airport		
United States	American Samoa, Pago Pago	Pago Pago International AirPort	Terminated	
United States	Dallas	Dallas Fort Worth International Airport	Terminated	
United States	Honolulu	Daniel K. Inouye International Airport		
United States	Los Angeles	Los Angeles International Airport		
United States	San Francisco	San Francisco International Airport		
Vanuatu	Espiritu Santo	Santo International Airport	Terminated	
Vanuatu	Port Vila	Bauerfield International Airport		
