= Peau Vavaʻu =

Airline of Tonga (2004–2007)

IATA	ICAO	Call sign
3O	PVU	PEAU
- Founded: 27 May 2004
- Commenced operations: 6 June 2004
- Ceased operations: November 2007
- Hubs: Haʻapai; Nukuʻalofa; Vavaʻu
- Headquarters: Pacific Royale Hotel, Nukuʻalofa, Tongatapu, Tonga
- Key people: George Tupou V (Owner); Joseph Ramanlal (Owner Director); Soane Ramanlal (Secretary)

Peau Vavaʻu Ltd (or Air Waves of Vavaʻu) was an airline based at the Pacific Royale Hotel in Nukuʻalofa, Tongatapu, Tonga. It operated domestic services. Its main base was Fuaʻamotu International Airport, Tongatapu, with hubs at Lifuka Island Airport and Vavaʻu International Airport.

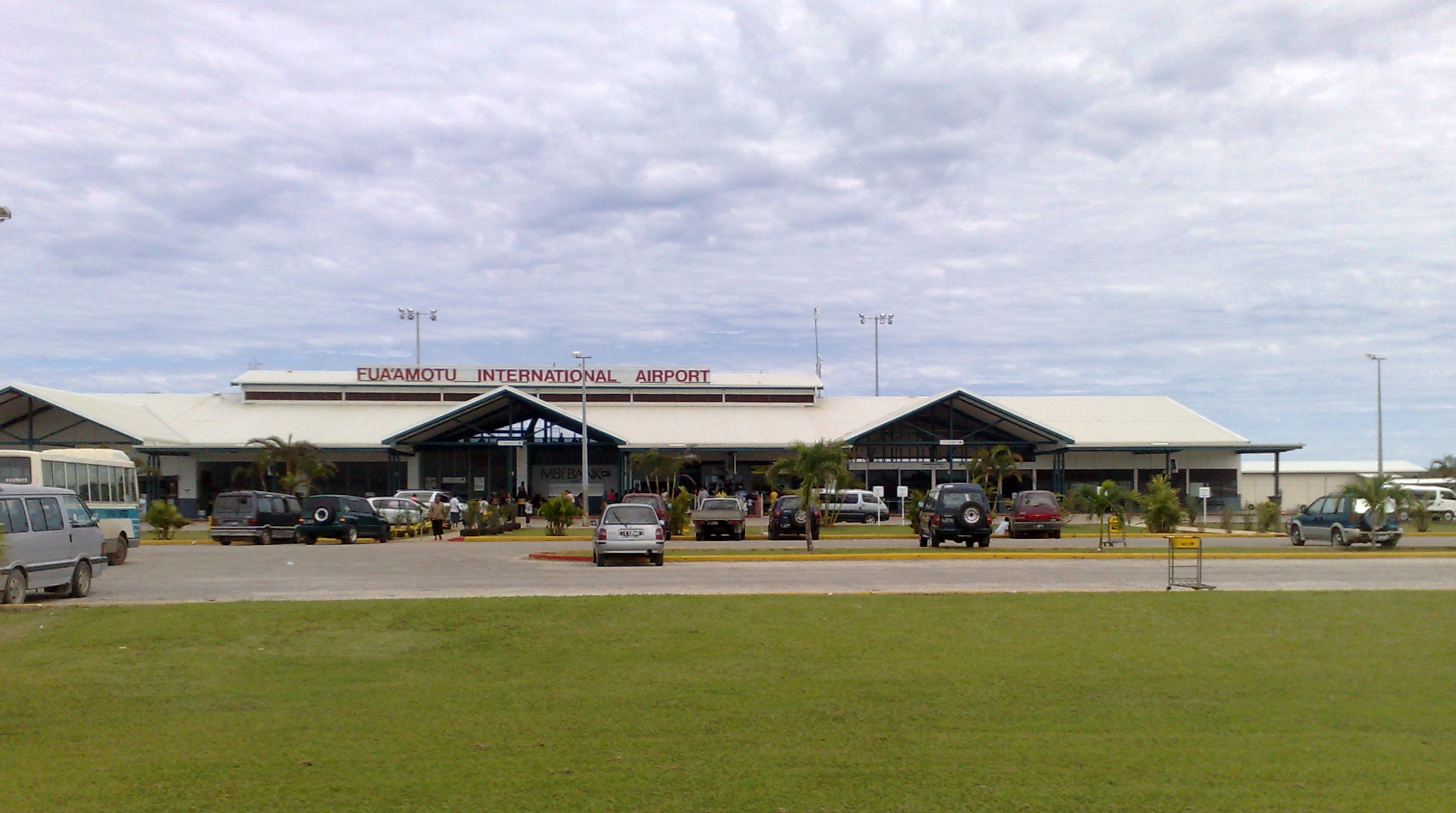
Fua'amoto International Airport

== History ==
Peau Vavaʻu was formed in May 2004 following the wake of the collapse of Royal Tongan Airlines. The airline was 50% owned by Crown Prince Tupouto'a. It began operations on 9 June 2004, using a Douglas DC-3 leased from New Zealand company Pion Air. In August 2004 the company was awarded a monopoly on domestic air transport under a new "one airline" policy, forcing the competing Fly Niu Airlines to cease operations. In August 2004 it announced the addition of a Britten-Norman BN-2 Islander to its fleet. In November 2004 it added a chartered De Havilland Canada Dash 8. that same month a test flight to ʻEua Airport overshot the runway, resulting in a flat tyre.

A second DC-3 arrived by Christmas 2004, when Peau Vavaʻu purchased both DC-3s from Pion Air. In March 2005 Peau Vavaʻu arranged to sublease an Air Chathams Convair aircraft from Reef Shipping, which had set up an airline in Niue. In February 2005 the airline was criticised for the high fares it proposed charging for flights to Niuatoputapu. In October 2005 the Tongan government threatened to withdraw the airline's monopoly after it had failed to service the Niua Islands. The monopoly was finally withdrawn and the "one airline" policy overturned in May 2006.

Flights were temporarily suspended in November 2006 when their corporate headquarters were destroyed during the 2006 Nukuʻalofa riots. Flights were planned to resume in May 2007. However, the airline never flew again, and its license was eventually surrendered in January 2008.

== Destinations ==
Peau Vavaʻu operated scheduled flights to Tongatapu, Haʻapai, and Vavaʻu.

== Fleet ==
The Peau Vavaʻu fleet included the following aircraft:

- BAe Jetstream 41
- Beechcraft Queen Air
- Douglas DC-3 among the last DC-3 in regular scheduled service worldwide

== Code data ==
- IATA Code: 3O
- ICAO Code: PVU
- Callsign: PEAU
