= Air Chathams =

Airline of New Zealand

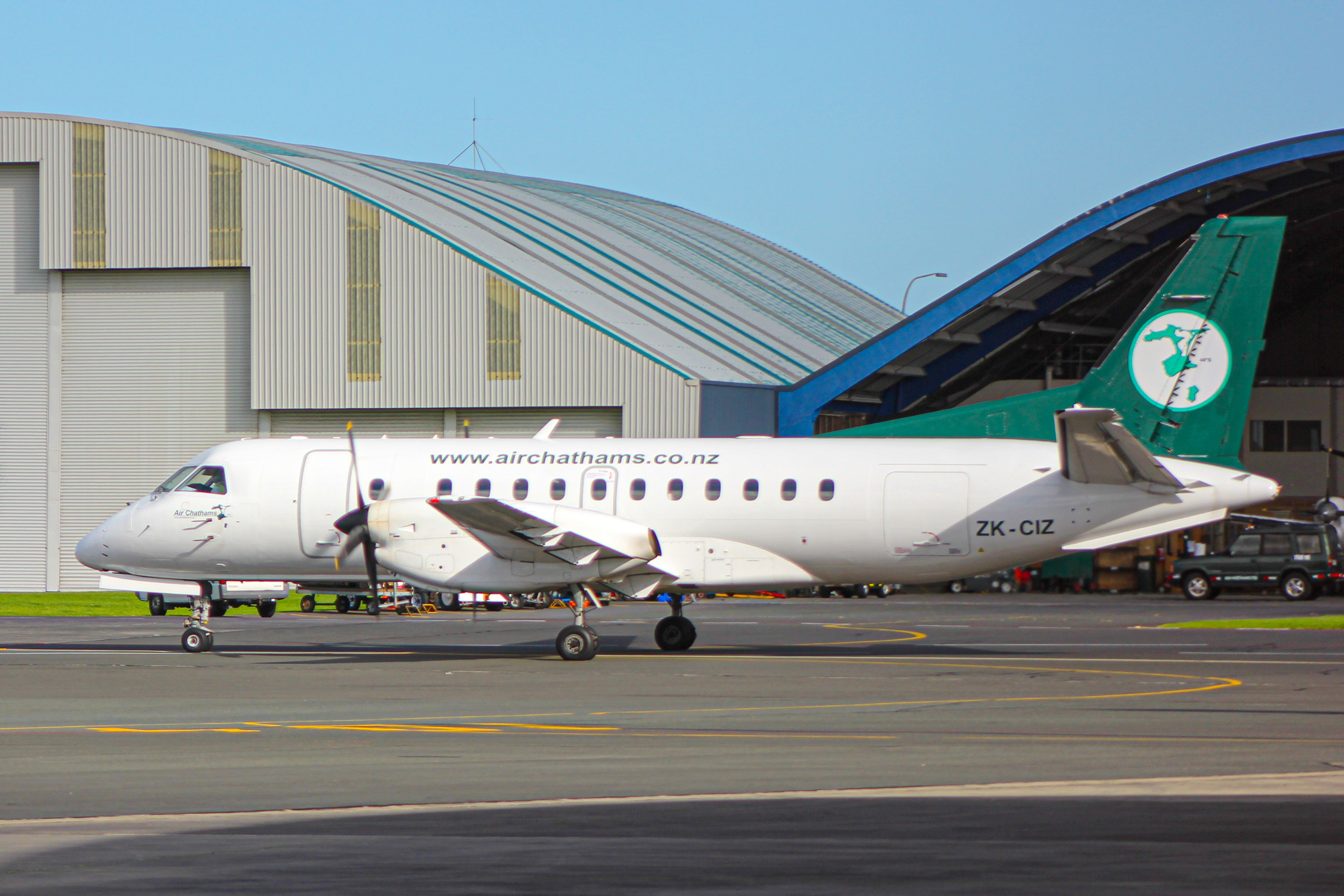
- Saab 340 at Auckland Airport in 2021
IATA	ICAO	Call sign
3C	CVA	CHATHAM
- Founded: 1984
- Operating bases: Auckland Airport, Chatham Islands Airport
- Fleet size: 10
- Destinations: 9
- Headquarters: Chatham Islands
- Key people: Craig Emeny (founder & director); Duane Emeny (CEO)
- Website: www.airchathams.co.nz

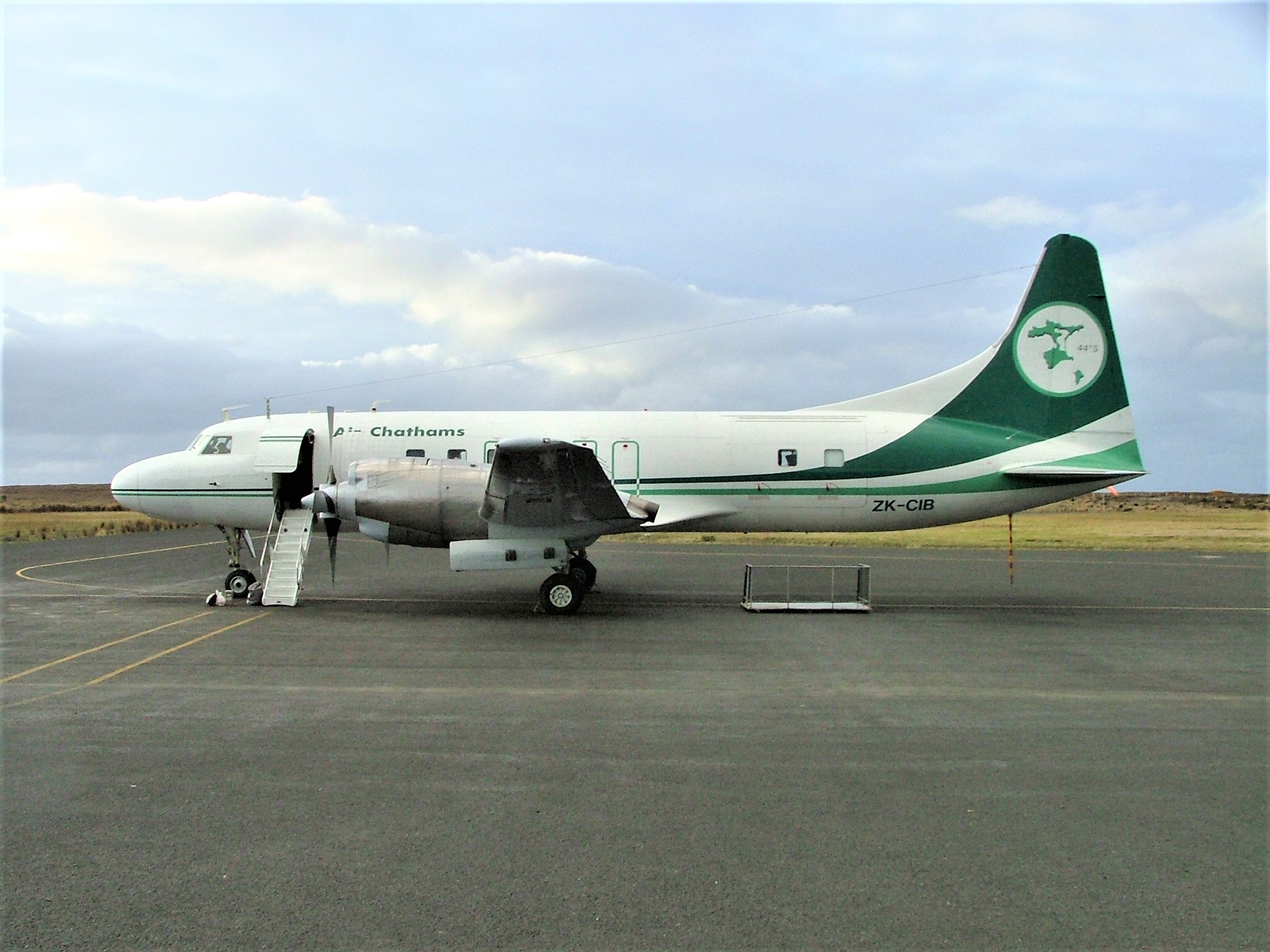
Air Chathams Convair 580 at Chatham Islands / Tuuta Airport in 2003

Air Chathams Limited is an airline based in the Chatham Islands, New Zealand. It was established in 1984 and operates scheduled passenger services between the Chatham Islands and mainland New Zealand, along with routes between Auckland and Whakatāne and Auckland and Whanganui. Its main base is Chatham Islands / Tuuta Airport.

== History ==
The airline was set up by Craig and Marion Emeny in 1984, and transports freight and people to and from mainland New Zealand.

Craig Emeny first moved to the Chatham Islands as a pilot to operate services primarily between Chatham and Pitt Islands. At that time the lack of regularity in flights to mainland New Zealand saw him start his own airline and begin operations to mainland airports. Air Chathams had the advantage of being based on the Chatham Islands and were able to avoid many of the weather-related issues that other airlines had operating to the Chathams. As the freight and passenger market developed, Air Chathams grew from operating small piston-engine aircraft to 50-seat two-engine turbo-prop aircraft.

In 2014 Air Chathams established a flight operations and maintenance base at Auckland Airport. From this base the company provides maintenance services both internally and to other airlines under contract. A fully owned subsidiary (Chathams Pacific) operated scheduled flights in Tonga until March 2013. The introduction of Chinese (PRC) aid financed aircraft and training facilities at the request of the Tongan government introduced competition to Chathams Pacific's routes. Air Chathams' management decided not to compete with the new airline, Real Tonga, and ceased all Tongan operations. With Air New Zealand regional route cut-backs, Air Chathams began serving the Auckland to Whakatāne route on 29 April 2015, Auckland to Whanganui on 31 July 2016 and Auckland to Kāpiti Coast from 20 August 2018.

In mid-2018, the airline announced that it was looking to re-establish flights between Auckland and Norfolk Island. Air Chathams announced in April 2019 they would be taking over a fourth Air NZ route by starting a weekly service from Auckland to Norfolk Island on 6 September 2019. In January 2025 Air Chathams announced that they were ending services to Norfolk Island in April 2025 due to rising operating costs and loss of subsidies from the Norfolk Island Regional Council.

== Destinations ==
=== Air Chathams destinations ===
This is a list of destinations, past and present, served by Air Chathams.

Hub
Future destination
Terminated destination
Charter

Destination	Country	IATA	ICAO	Airport
Auckland	New Zealand	AKL	NZAA	Auckland Airport
Blenheim	New Zealand	BHE	NZWB	Blenheim Airport
Chatham Island	New Zealand	CHT	NZCI	Chatham Islands / Tuuta Airport ^{[Base]}
Christchurch	New Zealand	CHC	NZCH	Christchurch Airport
Kāpiti Coast	New Zealand	PPQ	NZPP	Kapiti Coast Airport
Gisborne	New Zealand	GIS	NZGS	Gisborne Airport
Napier	New Zealand	NPE	NZNR	Hawkes Bay Airport
Pitt Island	New Zealand		NZPT	Pitt Island Airport (on demand)
Wellington	New Zealand	WLG	NZWN	Wellington Airport
Whakatāne	New Zealand	WHK	NZWK	Whakatāne Airport
Whanganui	New Zealand	WAG	NZWU	Whanganui Airport
Norfolk Island	Australia	NLK	YSNF	Norfolk Island Airport

=== Chathams Pacific destinations ===
This is a list of destinations formerly served by Chathams Pacific, a wholly owned subsidiary of Air Chathams that operated between 2007 and 2013.

Terminated destination

Destination	Country	IATA	ICAO	Airport
'Eua	Tonga	EUA	NFTE	'Eua Airport
Ha'apai	Tonga	HPA	NFTL	Salote Pilolevu Airport
Niuafoʻou	Tonga	NFO	NFTO	Niuafoʻou Airport
Niuatoputapu	Tonga	NTT	NFTP	Niuatoputapu Airport
Tongatapu	Tonga	TBU	NFTF	Fuaʻamotu International Airport
Vava'u	Tonga	VAV	NFTV	Vava'u International Airport

=== Interline agreements ===
- Air New Zealand

== Fleet ==
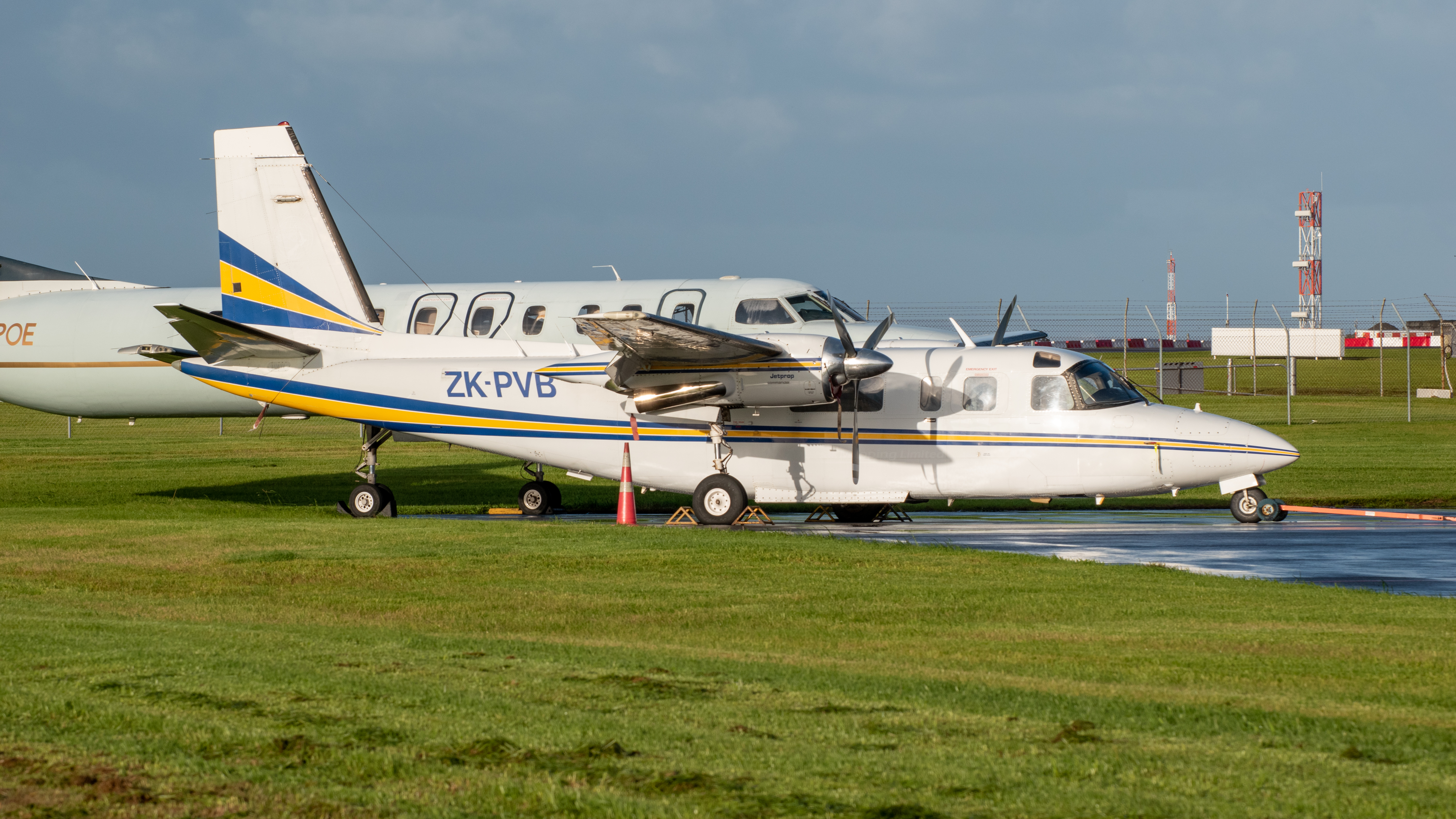
The single Air Chathams owned Aero Commander, at Auckland Airport

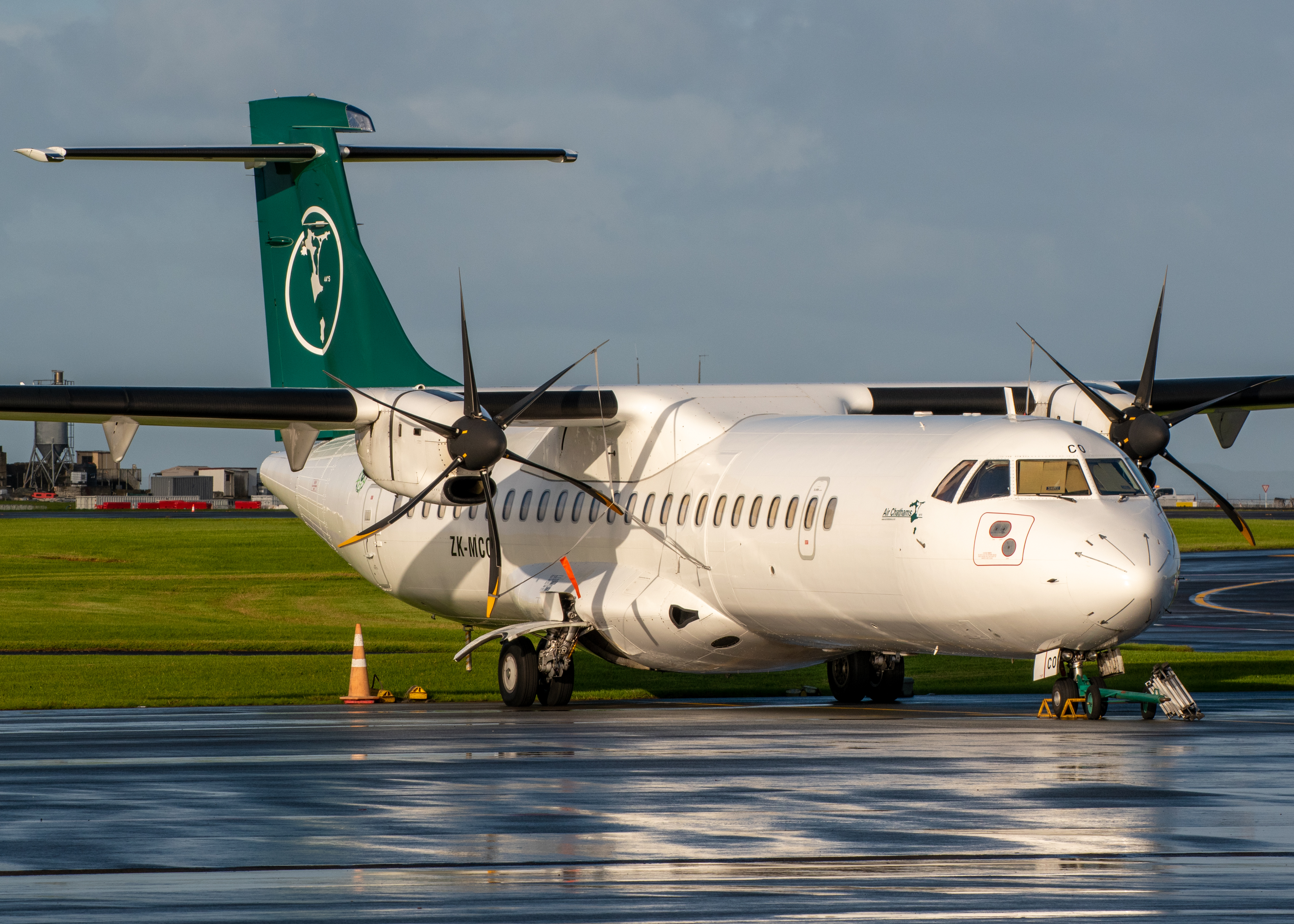
Air Chathams ATR72-500

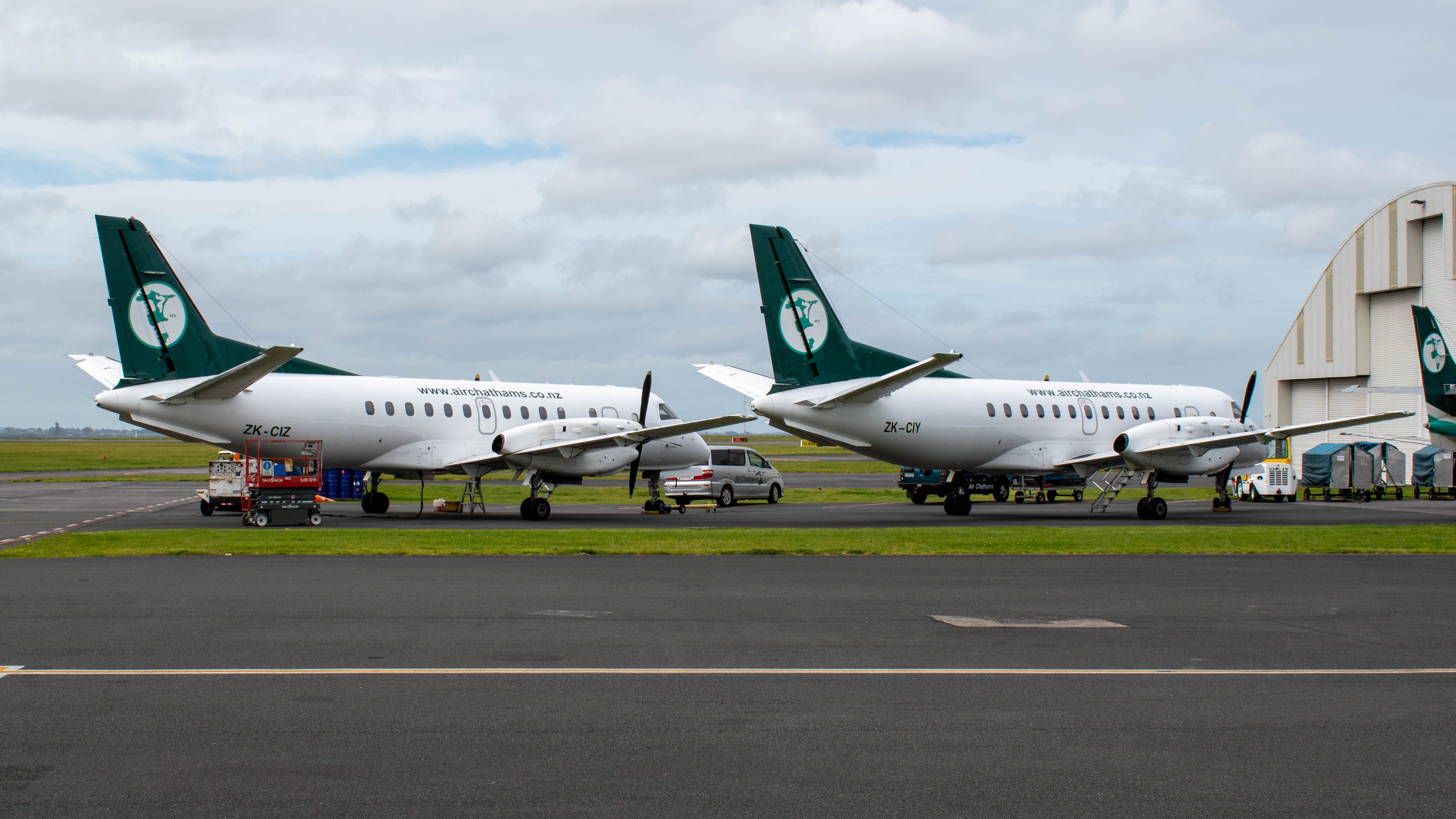
Two of the Air Chathams Saab 340s

As of January 2025, the fleet includes the following aircraft:

Air Chathams fleet
Aircraft	In service	Orders	Passengers	Notes
Aero Commander 690A	1	—	4	Use only for aerial mapping and survey duties.
ATR 72-500	2		68	(as of August 2025)
Cessna 206	1	—	5	Only flying between Chatham Island and Pitt Island.
Saab 340A	5	—	34	(as of August 2025)
Saab 340B	1	—	36	(as of August 2025)
Total	10			

The ATR and Saab 340s are used across the company's operations as well as contract freight services and charter work. The Cessna 206 provides a non-regular service between Chatham Island and Pitt Island and is on standby for search and rescue or local flights around the Chatham Islands. The airline's Aero Commander 690 has been wet-leased out for aerial mapping and survey duties.

Air Chathams acquired two ATR 72-500s from Mount Cook Airline in 2018. They run flights for Tauck Tours in summer, and assist with peak traffic to Whanganui and the Chatham Islands during winter. They are also used for flights to Te Anau. On 21 November 2024 an ATR72-500 flew from Auckland to Invercargill and return for a private charter, the longest non-stop flights by an ATR carrying passengers in New Zealand.

Air Chathams historic fleet
Aircraft	Total	Introduced	Retired	Notes
Convair 580	5	1984	2021	ZK-KFL operated as a freighter aircraft
Fairchild Metro III	3	1994	2024	All three were sold to Australia
Douglas DC-3	1	2015	2025	

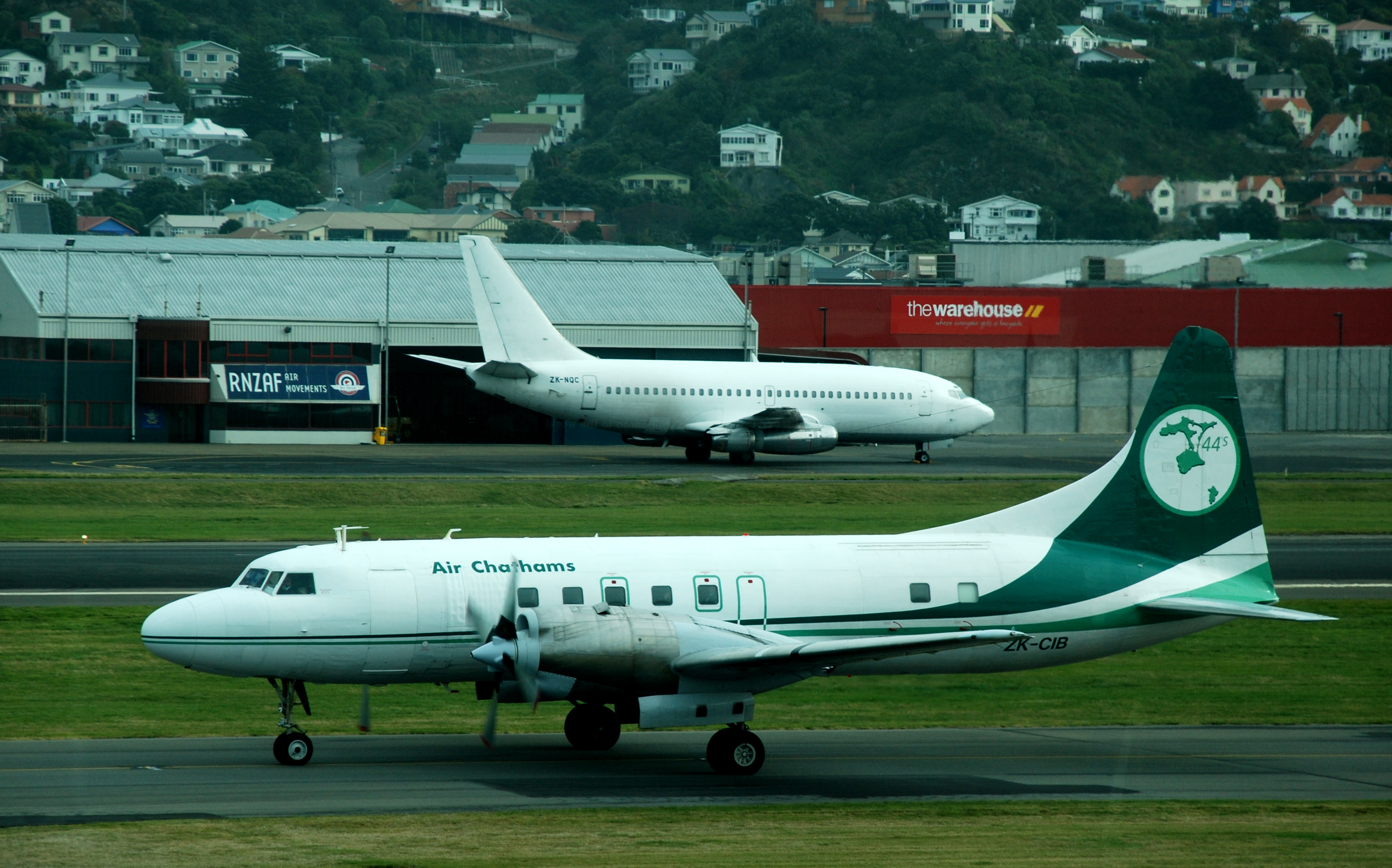
Air Chathams Convair 580 at Wellington Airport

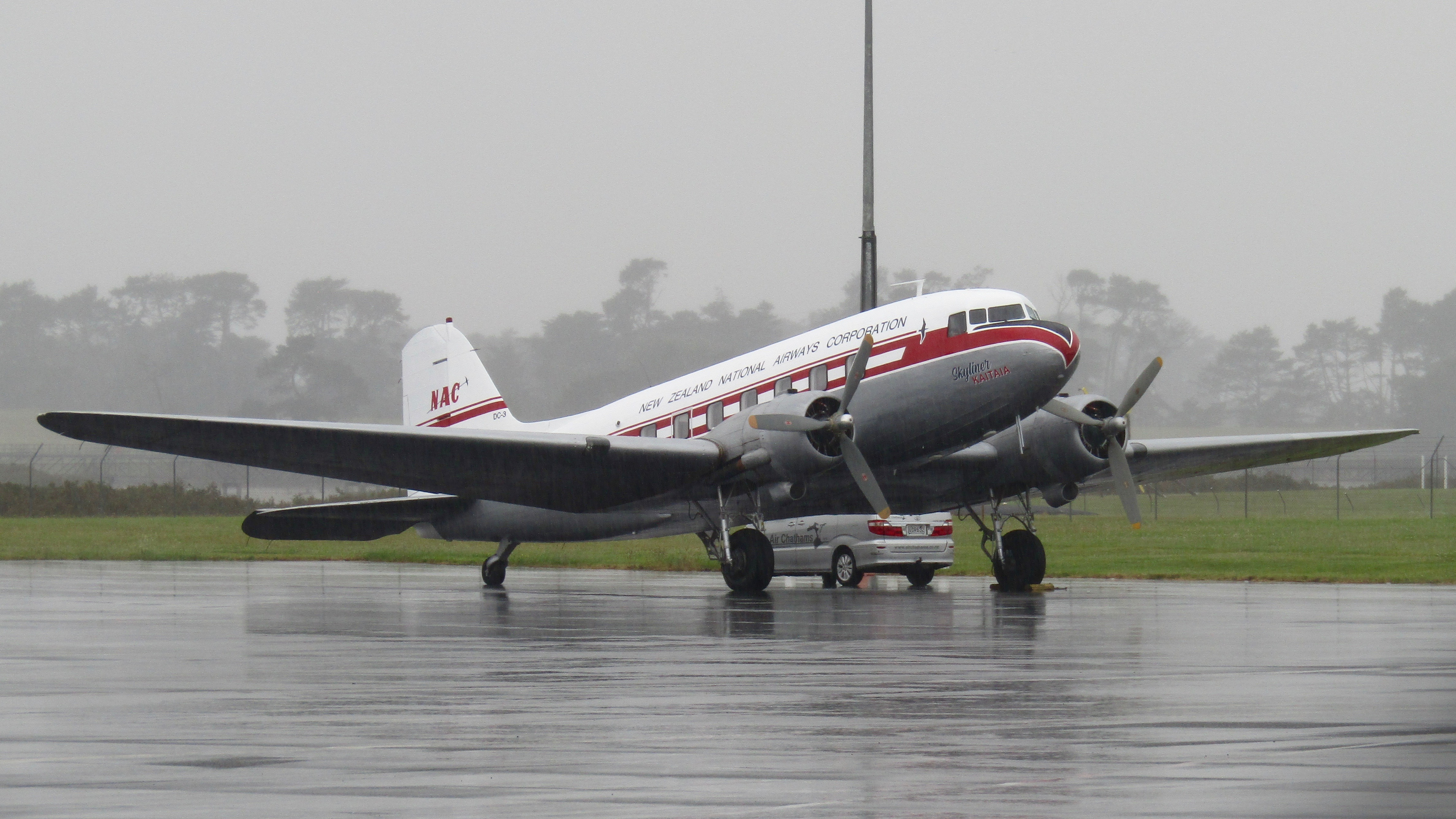
Air Chathams' NAC-livered DC-3 parked at their ramp at Auckland Airport

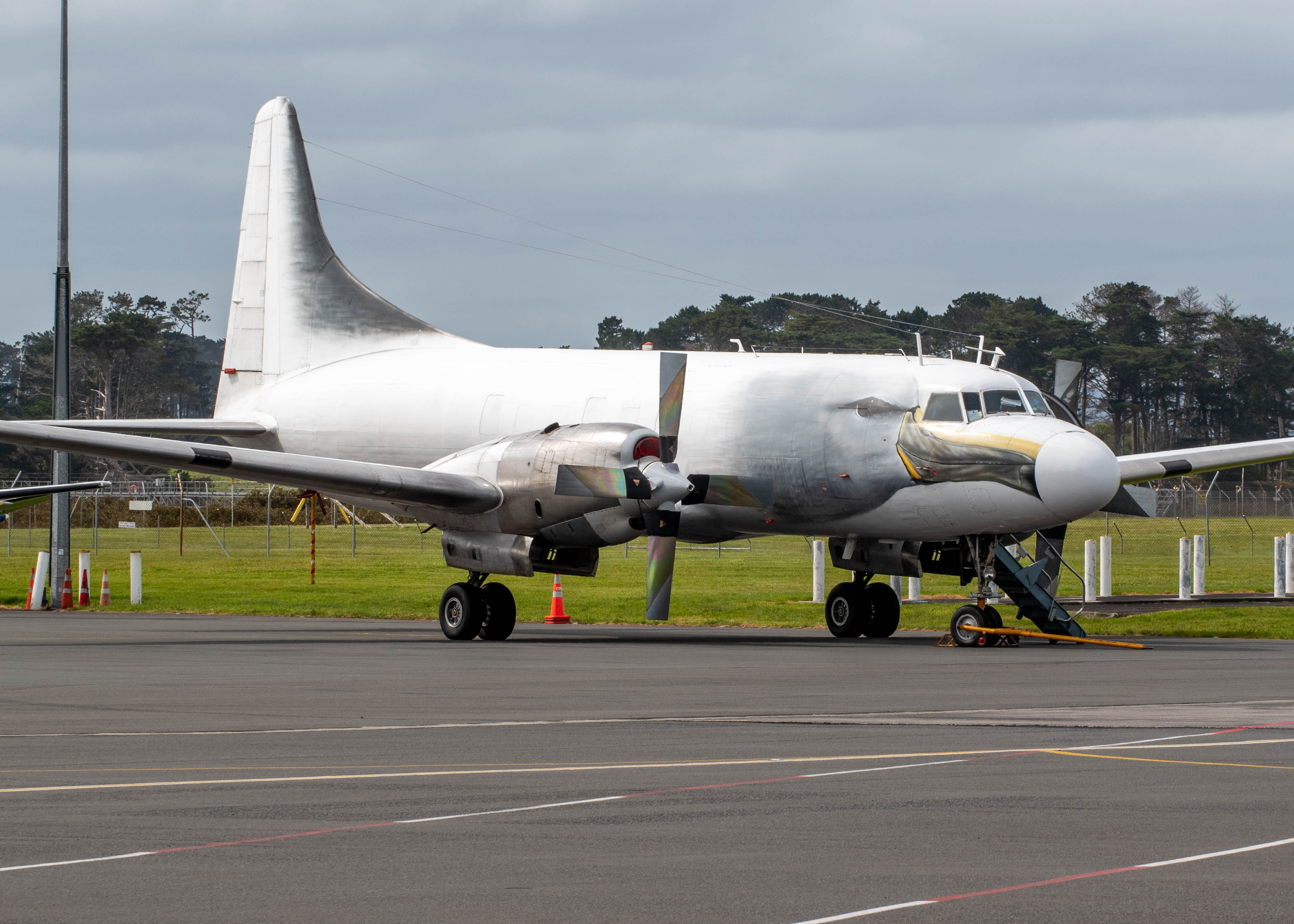
The Air Chathams CV-580 'Toroa Freighter' at Auckland Airport

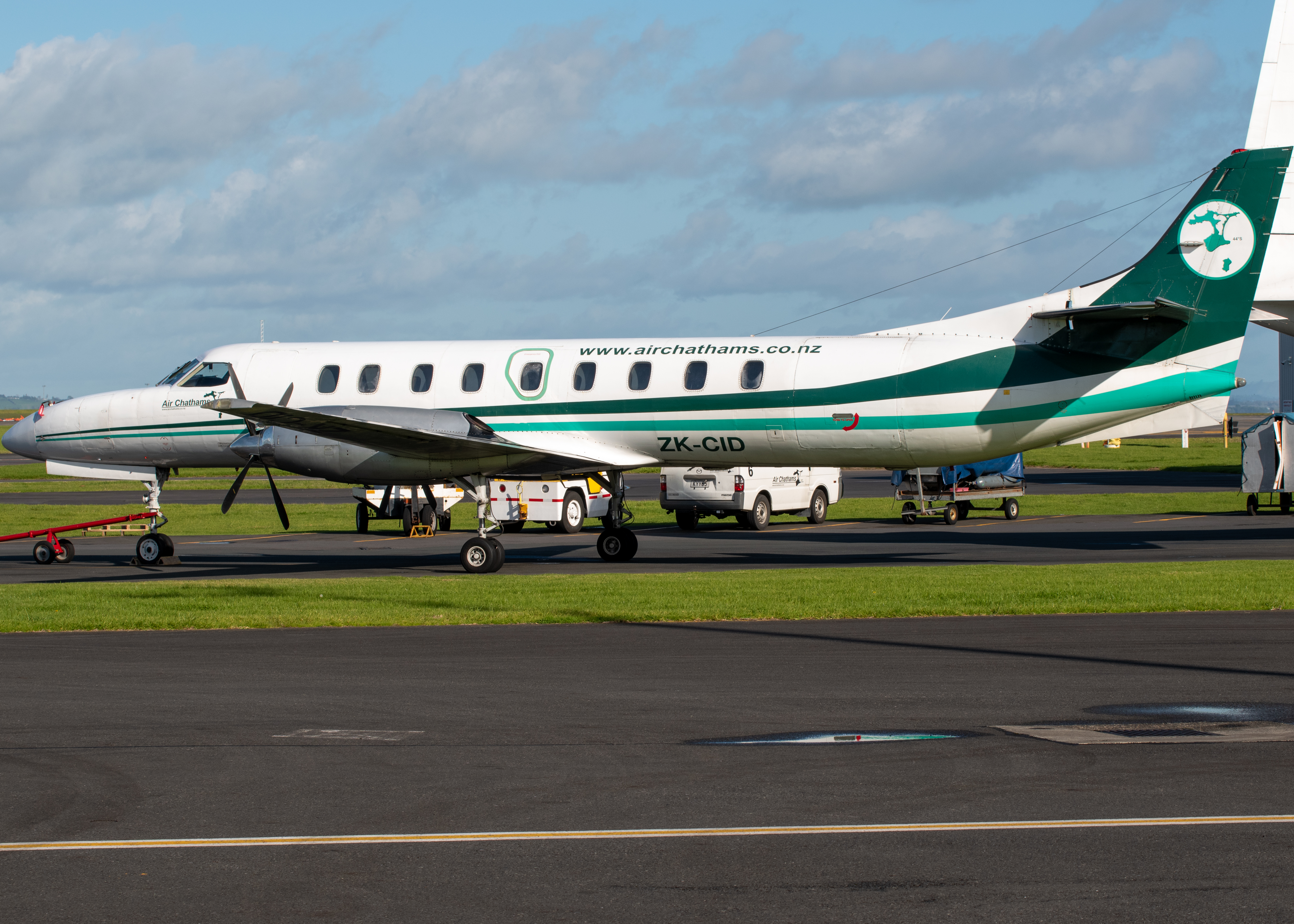
Air Chathams Fairchild Metroliner ZK-CID
