= Lifuka Island Airport =

Airport in Lifuka, Haʻapai, Tonga

Lifuka Island Airport Salote Pilolevu Airport
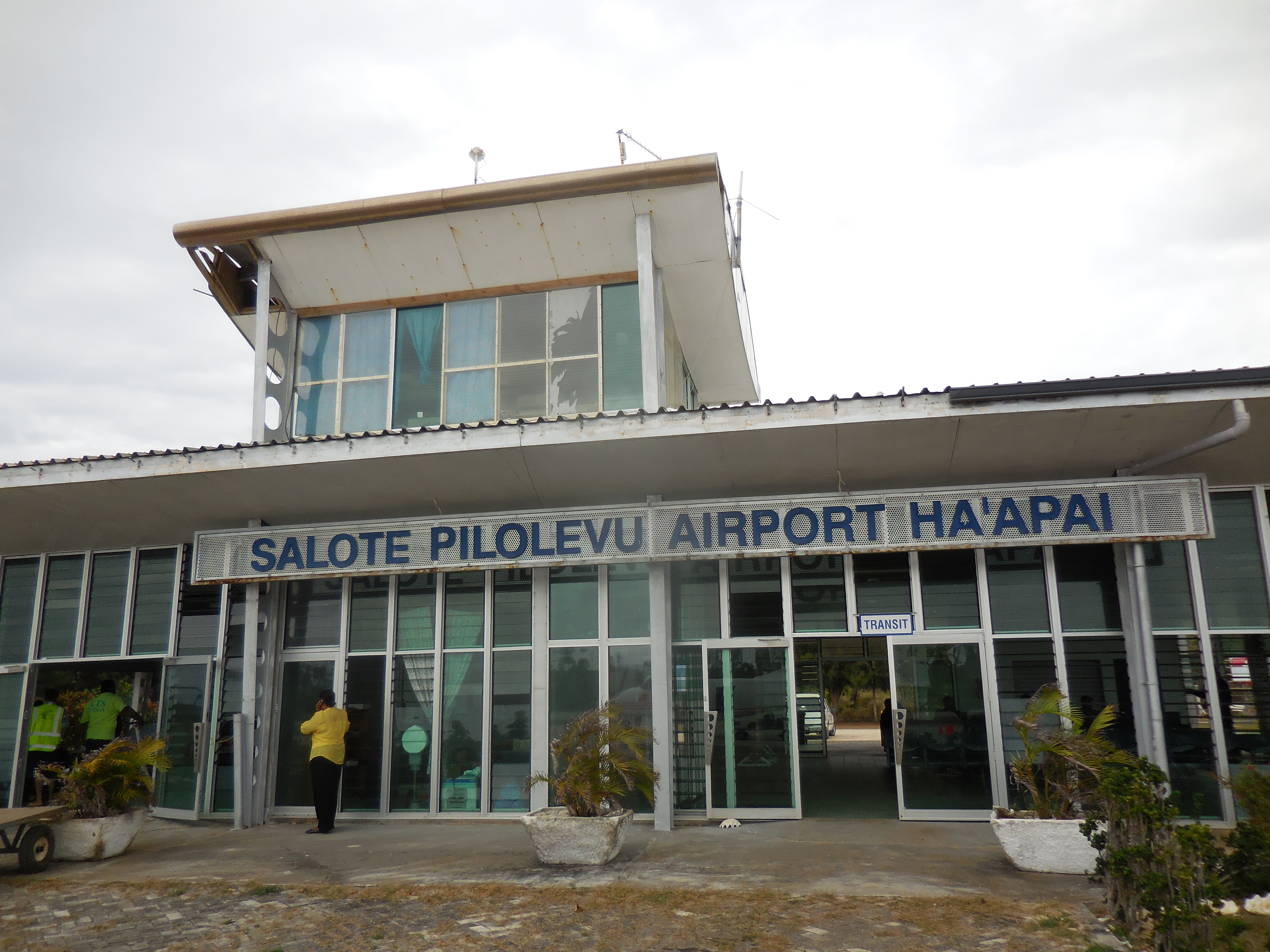
- IATA: HPA; ICAO: NFTL

Summary
- Airport type: Public
- Operator: Ministry of Civil Aviation
- Location: Lifuka, Haʻapai, Tonga
- Elevation AMSL: 29 ft (8.8 m)
- Coordinates: 19°46′36″S 174°20′28″W
- Website: www.tongaairports.com

Map
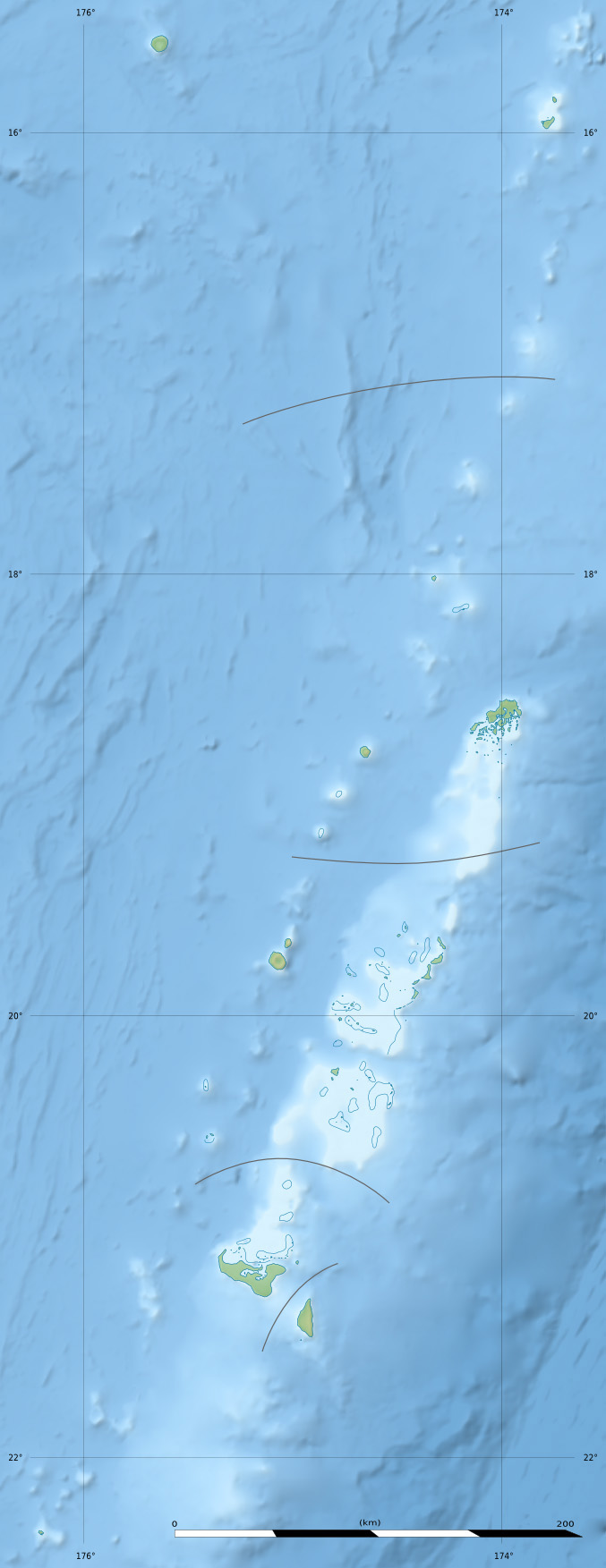
- Location of airport in Tonga

Runways
Direction	Length		Surface
Direction	ft	m	Surface
11/29	3,940	1,200	bituminous, tar or asphalt
- Source: Skybrary

Lifuka Island Airport (IATA: HPA, ICAO: NFTL), also known as Salote Pilolevu Airport or Haʻapai Airport, is an airport on Lifuka in Tonga. The airport is located 5 km (3.1 mi) north of the capital Panga, and is only served domestically, roughly 40 minutes by flight to Tongatapu and 30 minutes to Vava'u. Taxis serve the airport, and services include a cafe inside the terminal.

One of the airport's more distinctive features is the dirt road intersecting the runway. The road is the only path connecting Lifuka and Foa islands. Gates staffed by airport employees are used to prevent vehicle access during aircraft operations; the rest of the airport is otherwise secured with barbed wire fencing.

There is no aviation fuel or refueling service for aircraft available at the airport.

== History ==
Royal Tongan Airlines commenced operations to Ha'apai in the mid 1980s with CASA 212 aircraft. Around this time the airfield was improved, allowing Twin Otter operations to commence.

HS 748 operations followed this before the Short 360 began services on the route, flying to Ha'apai until the airline's collapse.

Following the collapse of Royal Tongan Airlines, Peau Vava'u was formed on 27 May 2004 as Tonga's first domestic-only airline, and remained the only airline in Tonga for a short period of time as a one-airline policy was imposed. This policy was revoked in 2005, the second domestic operating license being taken up by Airlines Tonga later that year.

Peau Vava'u operated flights to Ha'apai with leased DC-3s in June 2004, with Convair CV-580 flights commencing in May 2005 subleased from Reef Air and Air Chathams.

Air Fiji formed Airlines Tonga in December 2005 as a joint venture with Tongan travel agency Teta Tours. The airline was created to provide domestic services to Tonga, Ha'apai among the destinations.

Air Fiji chartered New Zealand operator Air Chathams to fly services in July 2006 for Airlines Tonga with Convair CV-580 aircraft for about a month.

In 2006, Peau Vava'u cut all flights after damage to its office in November. The airline never resumed flights. This made Airlines Tonga the only domestic carrier in Tonga until its collapse in August 2008.

On 14 April 2008, Chathams Pacific began five weekly flights to Ha'apai from Tongatapu. Services were inaugurated after the failure of Airlines Tonga and Peau Vava'u in the preceding years to fill the gap they left. This made the airline the only operator for some time.

Ha'apai flights were once again provided by Convair CV-580s, but also a Fairchild Metroliner and a Beech Queen Air.

With the announcement of Chinese funding for a new airline to compete with Chathams Pacific in early 2012, CEO Craig Emeny announced a withdrawal of flights from 2 March 2013.

Real Tonga supposedly would commence operation with two leased Harbin Y-12s on 4 March, however due to delays in aircraft arrivals, Air Chathams was chartered to fly services for the week following the end of operations.

Real Tonga would later receive a their own Y-12 and a Xian MA60 amid controversy over the type's safety. The MA60 was grounded in February 2015 due to these concerns. The airline has repetitively grounded the type since, but as of 2020, it's reported to still be operating.

In May 2016 Real Tonga commenced Saab 340 operations to Ha'apai.

The airport's deteriorating runway surface has been reported as the cause of multiple incidents of foreign object debris damages to aircraft operating to the airfield in 2015.

== Airlines and destinations ==
Lulutai Airlines connects Lifuka Island Airport to Fuaʻamotu International Airport (Nukuʻalofa).

== Gallery ==
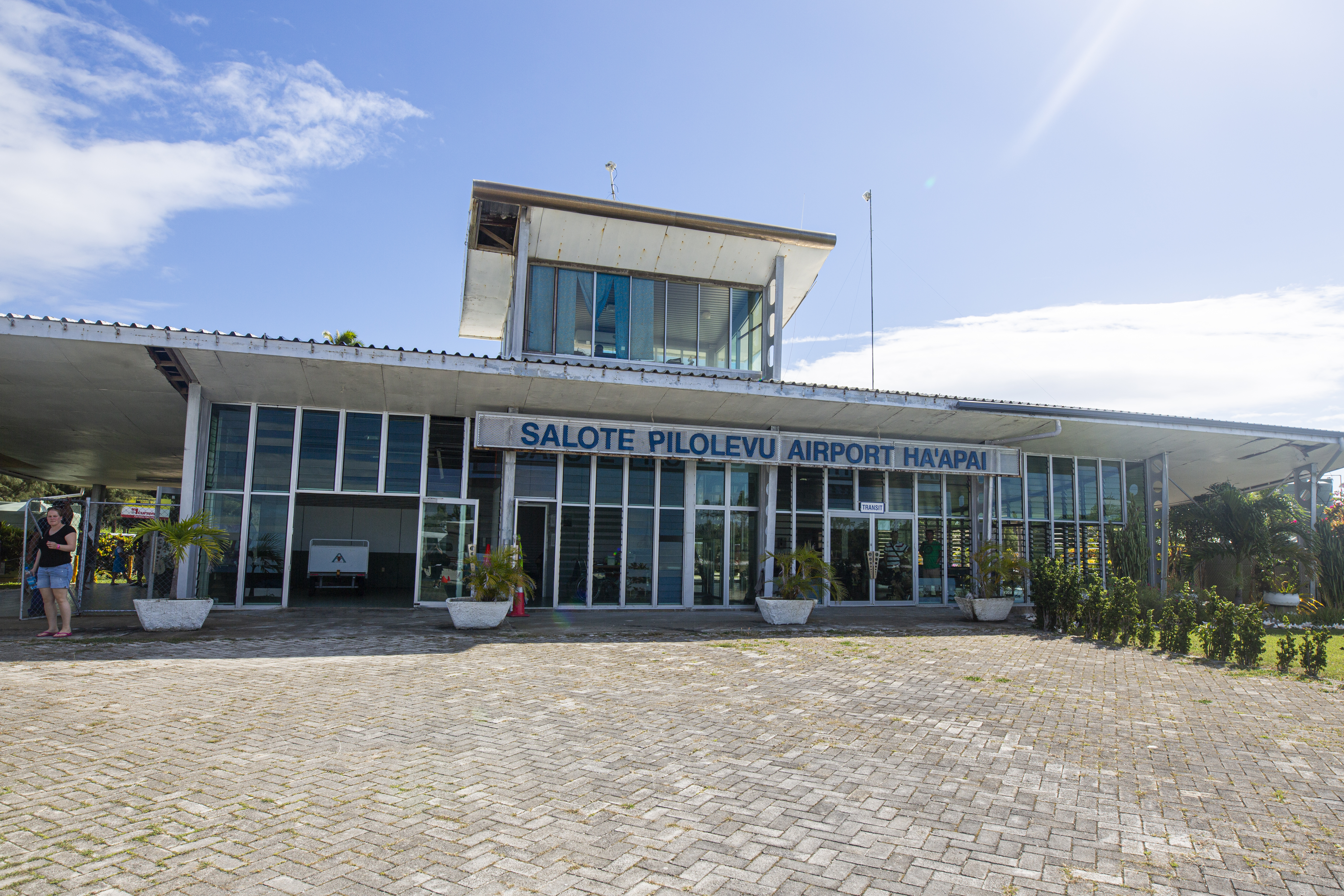
Terminal airside

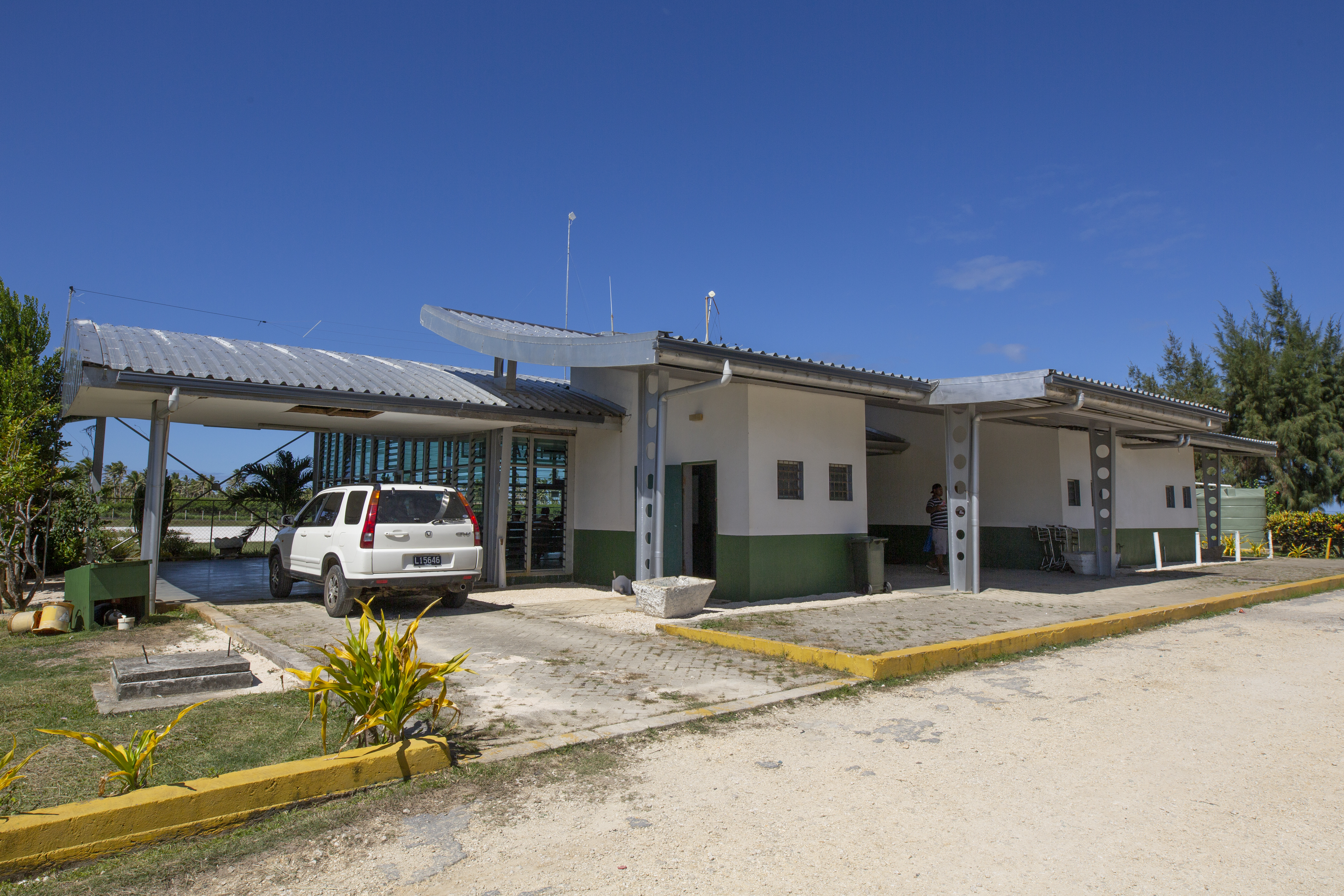
Terminal landside

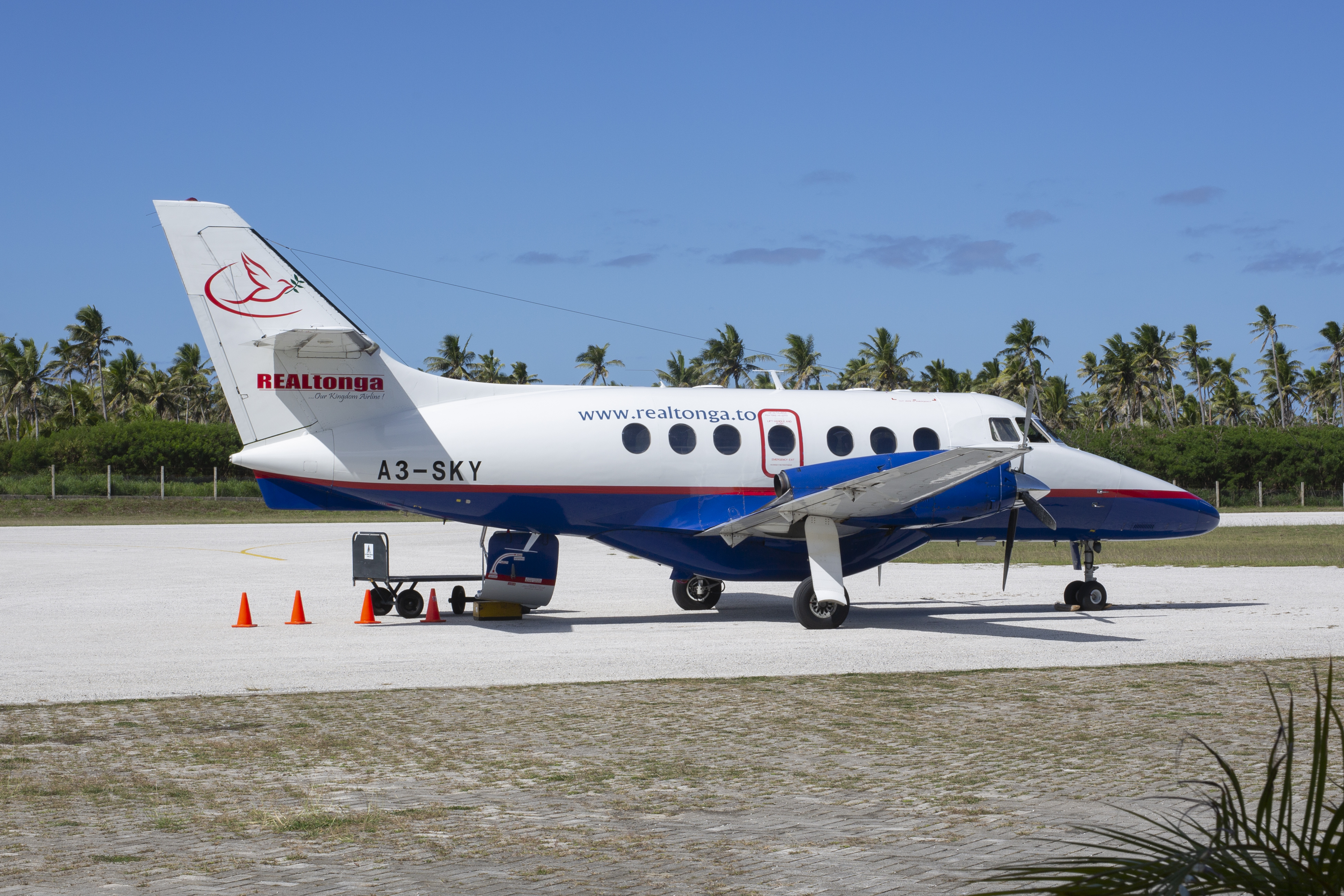
Real Tonga Airlines
