= Chatham Islands / Tuuta Airport =

Airport on Chatham Island, New Zealand

Chatham Islands Tuuta Airport
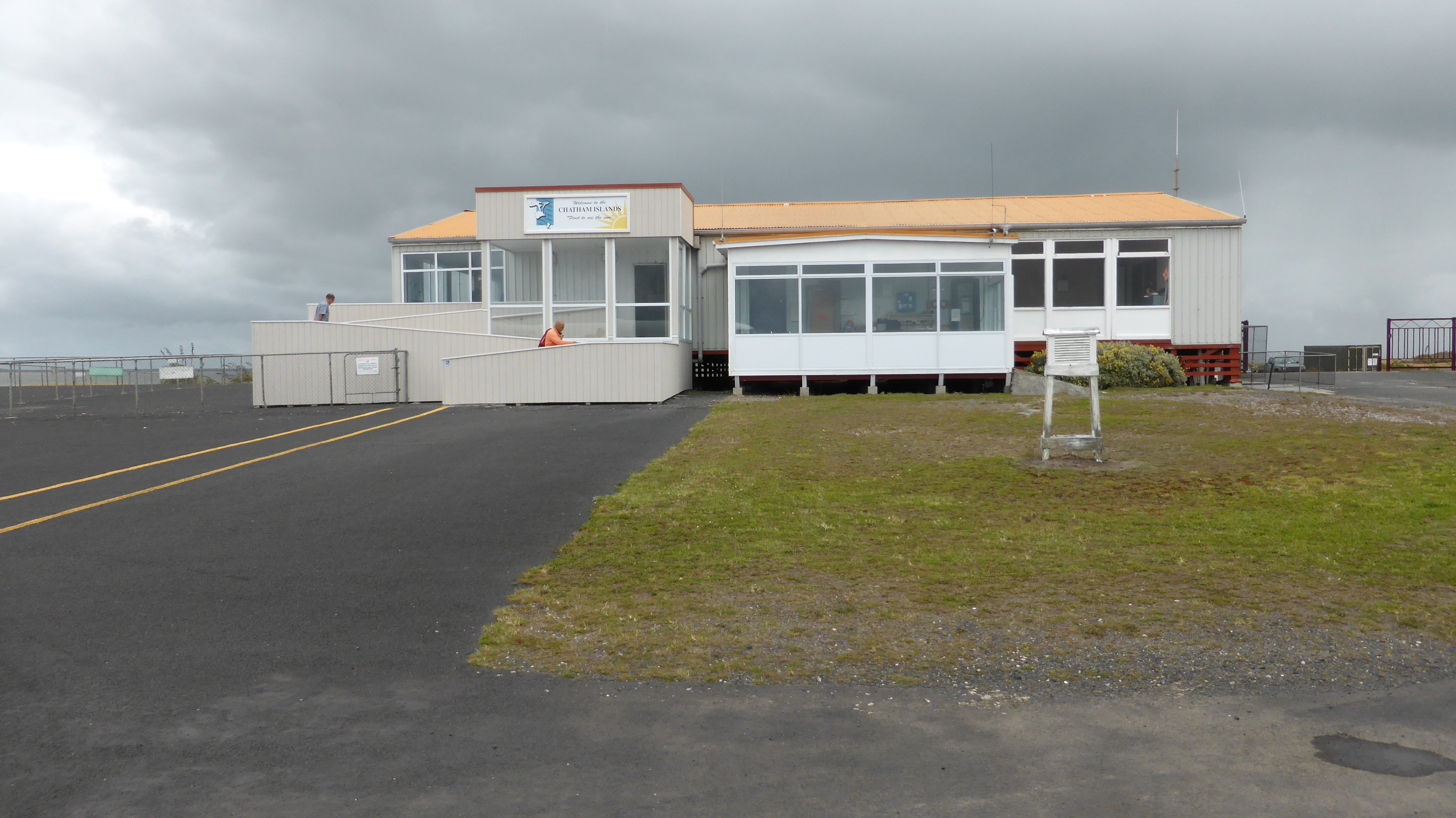
- The airport terminal before renovation
- IATA: CHT; ICAO: NZCI

Summary
- Airport type: Public
- Owner: Chatham Islands Enterprise Trust, Inc
- Operator: Chatham Islands Airport Limited
- Location: Waitangi, Chatham Islands
- Elevation AMSL: 43 ft (13 m)
- Coordinates: 43°48′36″S 176°27′26″W

Map
- Location on Chatham Island

Runways
Direction	Length		Surface
Direction	m	ft	Surface
05/23	1,850	6,070	Bitumen
- Sources: New Zealand AIP

Chatham Islands / Tuuta Airport (IATA: CHT, ICAO: NZCI) is an airport 10.5 nautical miles (19.4 km; 12.1 mi) northeast of Waitangi township on Chatham Island, New Zealand.

The airport, in part named in honour of Inia William Tuuta, the Chatham Islander who donated the land for the airport, was completed in 1982 to replace a compacted grass airstrip at Te Hapupu that could only handle slow-flying Safe Air Bristol Freighter aircraft. The Armstrong Whitworth Argosy immediately started operating to the islands using the new airport until 1990, when Mount Cook Airlines and later Air Chathams took over air services to and from mainland New Zealand.

A small aviation museum is also based there, signifying the importance that aviation has played in developing the economic wealth of the island group.

Air Chathams operates services to Auckland, Christchurch, and Wellington year round, with increased services in the summer. The airport is the base of Air Chathams and usually houses two aircraft overnight.

== Airport improvements ==
In 2012, the New Zealand Government announced plans to develop the airport as part of an overall economic plan for the Chatham Islands. Proposals included an extension out to 5250 feet (1600 metres) and resurfacing of the runway. A new passenger and administration terminal was also planned along with a larger apron area and a new large aircraft hangar.

In the first week of October 2024, the airport welcomed its first jet aircraft after a 490m extension of its existing runway (extended from 1360m to 1850m and widened from 30m to the standard 45m), strengthening work and doubled the size of the apron. A Texel Air Boeing 737 BCF cargo plane landed at the airport. The project was part of a $42m Government-funded project aimed at the island's connectivity and resilience and enhancing economic development opportunities.

On 12 August 2026, the airport's new terminal opened, after the original terminal building, built in 1982, was redeveloped. The new terminal included a new secure departure lounge, arrivals and check-in facilities were upgraded and security was enhanced. This was the last phase of the two phase airport redevelopment.

== Airlines and destinations ==
=== Passenger ===
Airlines	Destinations
Air Chathams	Auckland, Christchurch, Pitt Island (on request), Wellington
