= Airlines Tonga =

Airline of Tonga

Airlines Tonga Air Fiji Ltd

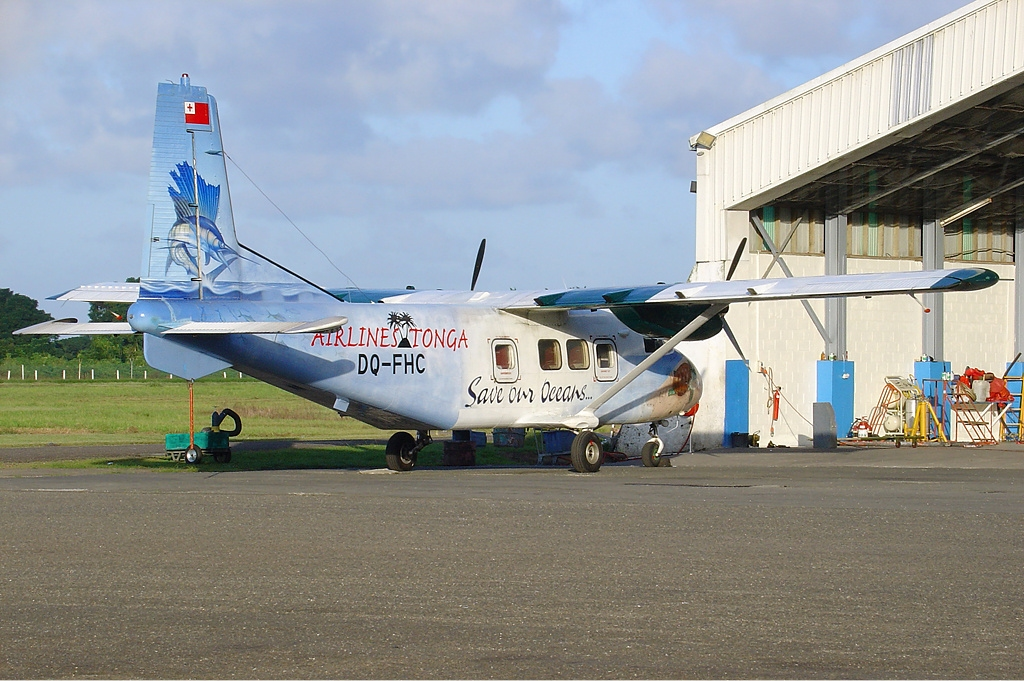
- Founded: December 2005
- Commenced operations: 2006
- Ceased operations: August 23, 2008
- Operating bases: Nukuʻalofa, Tonga
- Fleet size: See Fleet below
- Destinations: See Destinations below
- Parent company: Air Fiji (51%); Teta Tours (49%)
- Website: airlinestonga.com

Airlines Tonga was an airline based in Nukuʻalofa, Tonga. It operated services within Tonga and flights are operated on its behalf by Air Fiji.

== History ==
The airline started operations in December 2005 as a joint venture partnership between Air Fiji (49%) and Tongan travel agency Teta Tours (51%). Airlines Tonga became the second domestic airline of Tonga after Peau Vavaʻu.

On August 23, 2008, Airlines Tonga ceased all activity indefinitely, citing its inability to meet rising fuel costs.

== Destinations ==
Airlines Tonga operated services from Tongatapu to the following destinations:

- Vava'u
- Ha'apai
- 'Eua

== Fleet ==
The airline operated the following aircraft:

- 2x Harbin Y-12 Mark II twin engine turboprop aircraft
- Embraer EMB 110 Bandeirante twin engine turboprop aircraft
