= Fly Niu Airlines =

Airline in Tonga

- Founded: June 2004
- Commenced operations: June 2004
- Ceased operations: 10 September 2004
- Headquarters: Tonga

Fly Niu Airlines was an airline based in Tonga. It began and ceased operations in 2004.

== History ==
The airline was established 2004 as one of a number of services following the collapse of Royal Tongan Airlines. It began operations on 16 June 2004 using a De Havilland Canada Dash 8 flying to Vavaʻu. On 3 August 2004 the Tongan government revoked its air operators certificate after introducing a "one airline" policy on the basis that the country is too small to support more than one domestic airline. The monopoly was then granted to Peau Vavaʻu, owned by then Crown Prince Tupouto'a. The airline's certificate was reinstated after it obtained a court injunction against the policy, but it was forced to cease operations on 10 September 2004 after the injunction was overturned by Tonga's Supreme Court. A subsequent judicial review was unsuccessful.

In October 2019, Fly Niu CEO ‘Atu Fīnau announced that the airline to be flying in Tonga by December that year. The CEO said he had been told Lord Tu’ivikano's government removed the kingdom's one airline policy.
