= Niuatoputapu Airport =

Niuatoputapu Airport Mata'aho Airport
- IATA: NTT; ICAO: NFTP

Summary
- Airport type: Public
- Owner: Government
- Operator: Ministry of Civil Aviation
- Location: Hihifo, Niuatoputapu, Tonga
- Elevation AMSL: 9 m (30 ft)
- Coordinates: 15°58′36″S 173°47′30″W
- Website: www.tongaairports.com

Map
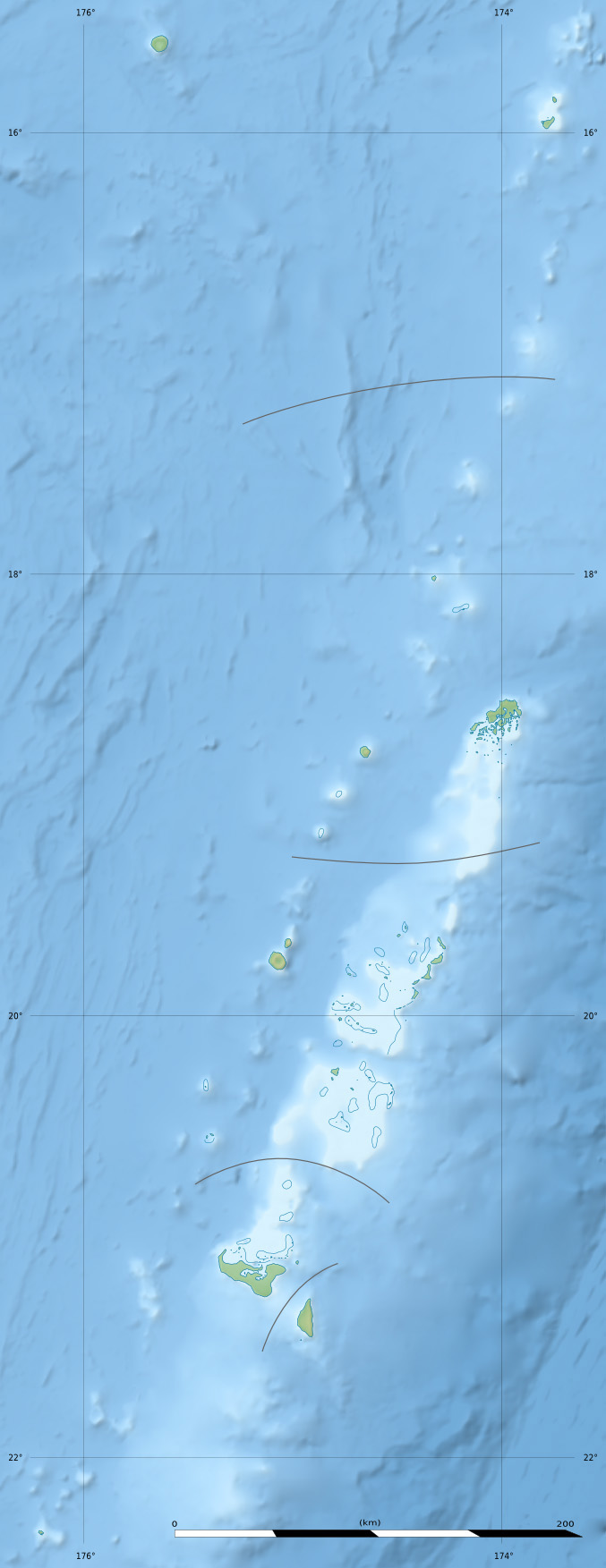
- Location of airport in Tonga

Runways
Direction	Length		Surface
Direction	ft	m	Surface
	4,000	1,219	unsealed coral strip

Niuatoputapu Airport (IATA: NTT, ICAO: NFTP), also known as Mata'aho Airport, is an airport in Niuatoputapu, Tonga. The airfield is an unsealed coral strip.

Damage to the airport from the 2009 Samoa earthquake and tsunami caused it to be temporarily closed following the disaster. After clearing the mud and debris of the runway, the rest of the country was finally equipped to provide aid to empower the Niuatoputapu residents and facilitated the rehabilitation of the community.

A small cinder block building acts as terminal and airport office. Fuel drums are located next to the terminal.

Connections to other parts of the island are made by taxi.

The airport was serviced by Real Tonga, but in 2020 the airline ceased operations, leaving the country without a domestic air service. Lulutai Airlines has now taken over the Tonga to Niuatoputapu route.

== Airlines and destinations ==
Lulutai Airlines connects Niuatoputapu Airport to Fuaʻamotu International Airport (Nukuʻalofa).
