= Vavaʻu International Airport =

Vavaʻu International Airport Malaʻe Vakapuna Fakavahaʻapuleʻanga Vavaʻu
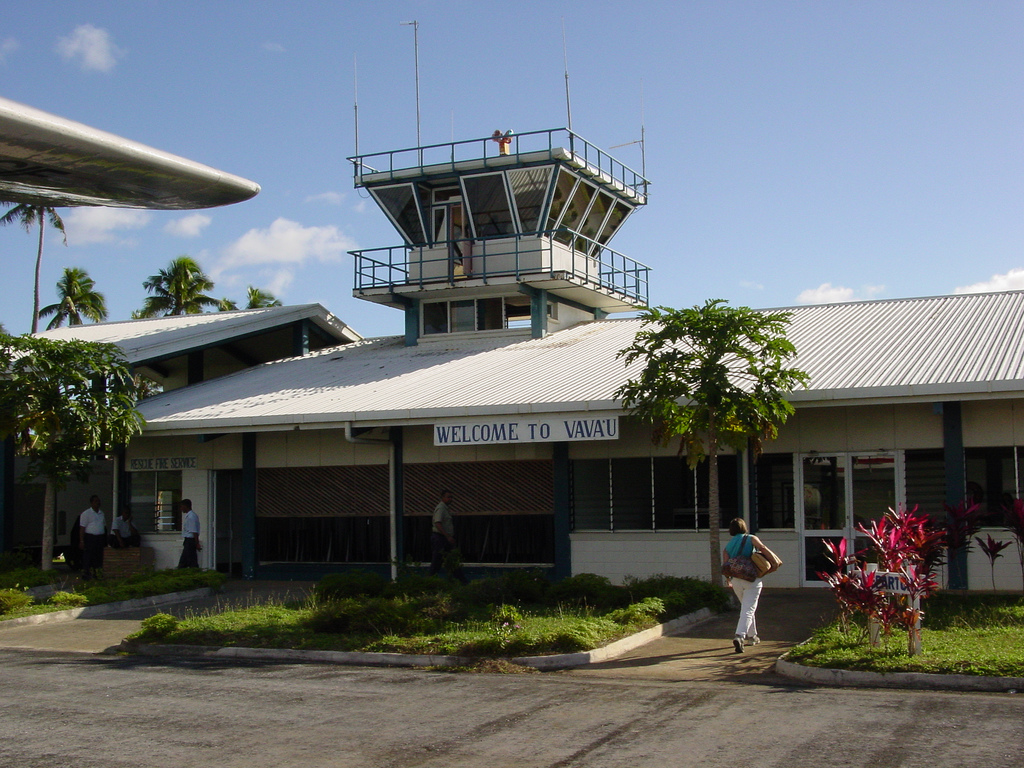
- IATA: VAV; ICAO: NFTV

Summary
- Airport type: Public
- Operator: Ministry of Civil Aviation
- Location: Vavaʻu, Tonga
- Elevation AMSL: 236 ft (72 m)
- Coordinates: 18°35′07″S 173°57′42″W

Map
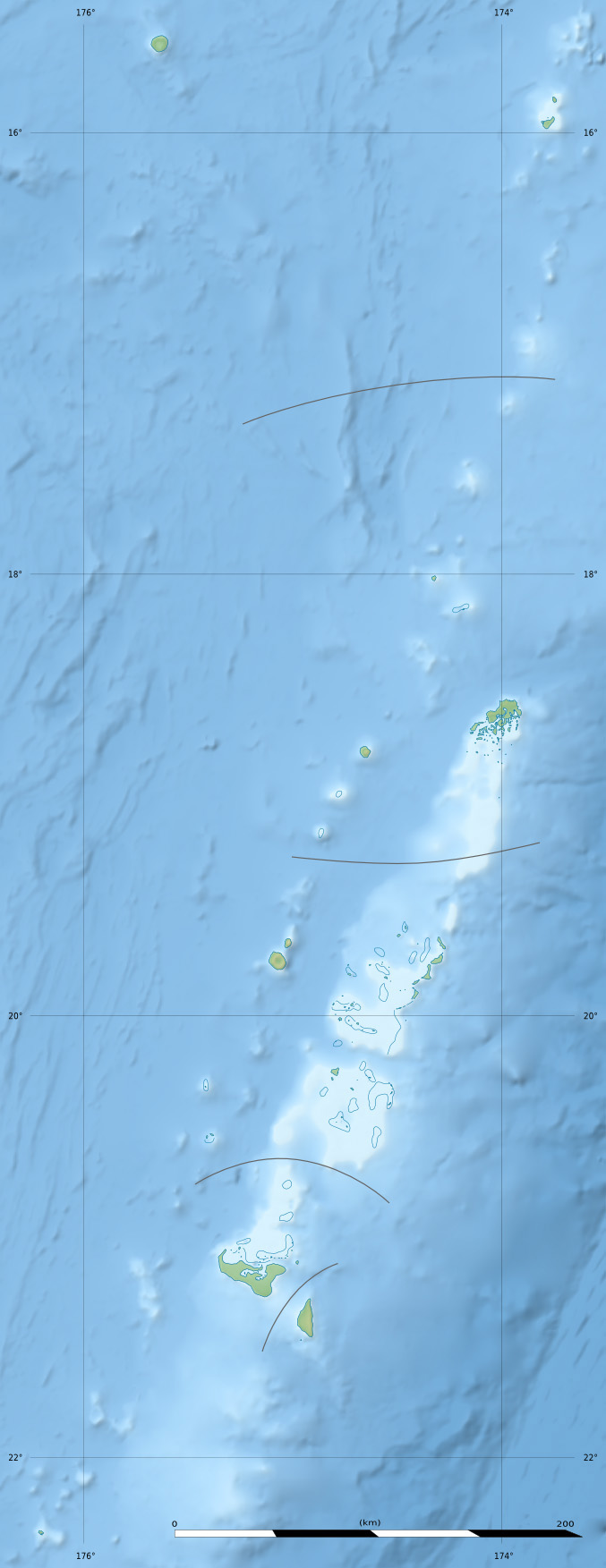
- Location of airport in Tonga

Runways
Direction	Length		Surface
Direction	ft	m	Surface
08/26	5,593	1,705	Bitumen
- Source: World Aero Data

Vavaʻu International Airport (IATA: VAV, ICAO: NFTV), also known as Lupepauʻu International Airport, is an airport in Vavaʻu, Tonga. The airport is located 10 km (6.2 mi) north of the capital Neiafu.

The airport has limited direct service, currently through Fiji Airways. Previously services had been provided by Chathams Pacific (until 2013) and Real Tonga (until 2020). In 2020, Lulutai Airlines began service but paused service in January 2023 due to its damaged aircraft needing repairs.

Less frequent services connect Vava’u to Ha’apai, Niuafoʻou and Niuatoputapu. Flight time is 50 minutes to Tongatapu, 30 minutes to Ha’apai and a little over one hour to both Niuatoputapu and Niuafo’u.

In October 2021 the Tongan Government announced plans for an NZ$172 million upgrade of the airport, including a longer runway, replacement terminal, and renewable energy plant. The expansion would allow direct flights from New Zealand and Australia, and be funded by a public-private partnership. In December 2024 acting prime minister Samiu Vaipulu announced the airport would be privatised. In February 2025 the new government of ʻAisake Eke reversed the privatisation decision.

== Airlines and destinations ==
=== Passenger ===
Airlines	Destinations
Fiji Airways	Seasonal: Nadi
Lulutai Airlines	Nuku'alofa
