= Niuafoʻou Airport =

Niuafoʻou Airport Kuini Lavinia Airport
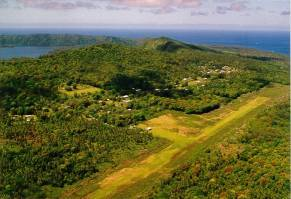
- The Niuafoʻou airstrip as seen from a plane
- IATA: NFO; ICAO: NFTO

Summary
- Airport type: Public
- Owner: Government
- Operator: Ministry of Civil Aviation
- Location: Niuafoʻou, Tonga
- Elevation AMSL: 72 m (236 ft)
- Coordinates: 15°34′16″S 175°37′51″W
- Website: www.tongaairports.com

Map
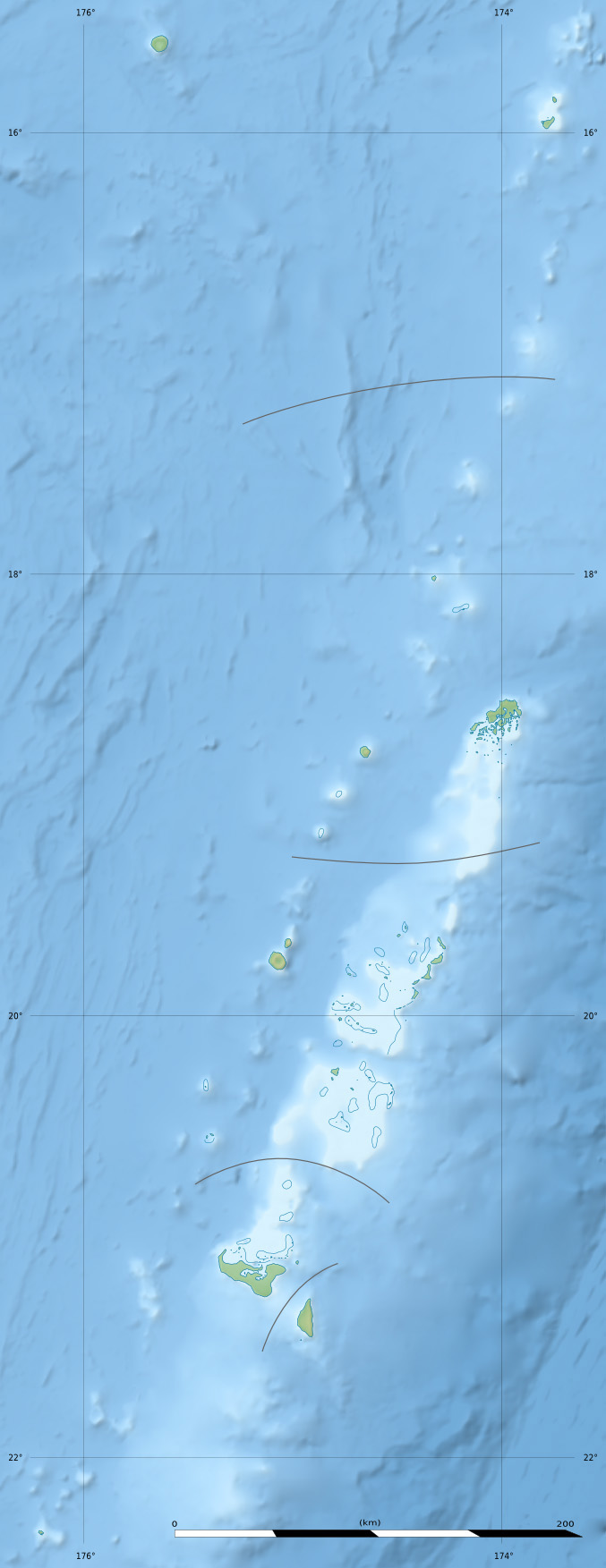
- Location of airport in Tonga

Runways
Direction	Length		Surface
Direction	ft	m	Surface
	2,800	853	Grass strip

Niuafoʻou Airport (IATA: NFO, ICAO: NFTO), also known as Kuini Lavinia Airport, is an airport in Niuafoʻou, Tonga. It was built in 1983. Its inauguration was celebrated with an issue of stamps.

== Airlines and destinations ==
Lulutai Airlines connects Niuafoʻou Airport to Fuaʻamotu International Airport (Nukuʻalofa).

== Facilities ==
The airport has one runway with a grass surface that is 853 metres (2,799 ft) in length.
