= Lulutai Airlines =

Airline of Tonga

IATA	ICAO	Call sign
L8	TON	TONGA
- Founded: 24 September 2020; 6 years ago
- Hubs: Fuaʻamotu International Airport
- Fleet size: 2
- Destinations: 6
- Parent company: Government of Tonga
- Headquarters: Nuku’alofa, Tonga
- Website: www.lulutai-airlines.to

Lulutai Airlines is a Tongan airline that operates domestic flights within Tonga. It commenced operations on 24 September 2020, after the collapse of Tonga's only domestic airline, Real Tonga.

== History ==
Lulutai Airlines began flying in September 2020. This followed the demise of Real Tonga earlier that year, leaving Tonga without domestic air service. Real Tonga had struggled to be financially viable since its inception in 2013. COVID-19 exacerbated that situation, and $500,000 in damages from a bird strike incident in Vava'u in May 2020 involving the Saab 340 forced the airline to close. Soon after, the Saab's owner, Montrose Global, canceled the lease and transferred the plane to Lulutai Airlines on a dry lease. The Tongan Government owns the Y12 plane after China donated it.

== Fleet ==
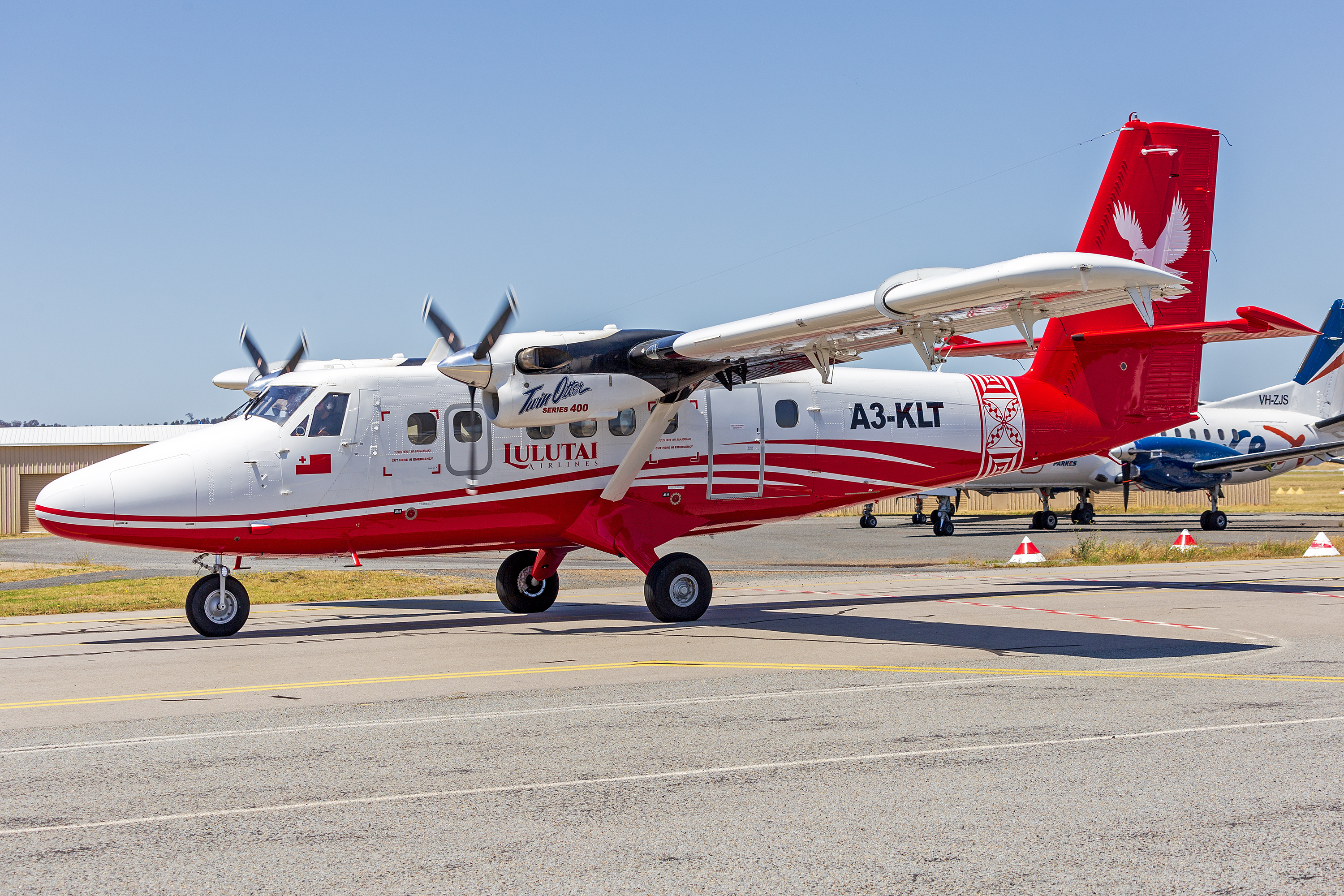
Viking Air DHC-6 Twin Otter Series 400

As of August 2025, Lulutai Airlines operates the following aircraft:

Lulutai Airlines fleet
Aircraft	In service	Orders	Passengers	Notes
Harbin Y-12	1	—	Max 17	
Saab 340B(Plus)	1	—	Max 34	
Total	2	—		

Tongan Government-owned Lulutai Airlines provides much-needed connectivity between the Tongan islands. The airline has a fleet of just two planes, a Saab 340 (A3-PUA) and a 12 seater Harbin Y-12 that formerly flew for now-defunct Real Tonga.

== Destinations ==
Lulutai Airlines connects Tonga's primary airport at Tongatapu (near the capital Nukuʻalofa) with ʻEua, Vava'u, Ha'apai, Niuafo'ou, and Niuatoputapu. According to the airline's website, it is planning to offer international service to Fiji, Niue, and New Zealand in the future, however it provided no expected launch dates.

== Incidents and accidents ==
On 17 January 2023, Lulutai Airlines sent out an urgent public notice: "We regret to inform the public that our Saab aircraft must undertake urgent maintenance work, and will therefore be unable to conduct flights beginning Tuesday 17 January, 2023. Although our other aircraft, the Y12 is still flying, we kindly ask for your understanding and cooperation as we prioritise passengers travelling for medical reasons, and passengers travelling to connect to international flights. Once again, we apologise for the inconvenience caused, but safety of air travel is our most important consideration." Fiji Airways announced that it would support operations from February through June while the airline's Saab aircraft is undergoing urgent repairs that may take up to four months to complete. Passengers, islanders, and tourism companies expressed their frustration receiving refunds and disappointment with the news. The island of Vava'u has experienced devastating economic impacts to its tourism industry resulting from the suspension of services. In February 2023, the Australian government announced that it would help develop a business plan to aid Lulutai Airlines and help it serve the island of Vava'u while the repairs were being completed.

In December 2023 a Lulutai Saab 340 hit a cement block while taxiing at Fuaʻamotu International Airport. No passengers were harmed.
