= ʻEua Airport =

Airport in ʻ Mua, Tonga

Eua Airport Kaufana Airport
- IATA: EUA; ICAO: NFTE

Summary
- Airport type: Public
- Operator: Ministry of Civil Aviation
- Serves: ʻEua, Tonga
- Location: ʻ Mua
- Elevation AMSL: 325 ft (99 m)
- Coordinates: 21°22′38″S 174°57′28″W
- Website: www.TongaAirports.com

Map
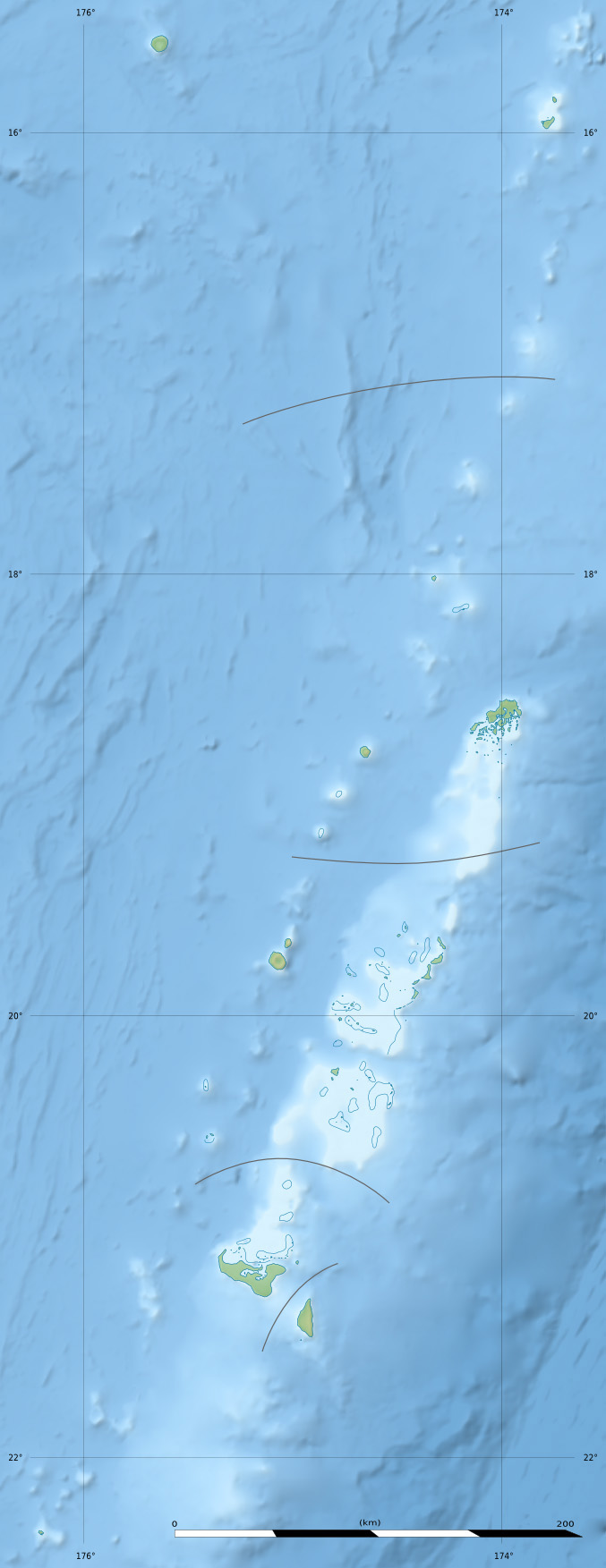
- Location of airport in Tonga

Runways
Direction	Length		Surface
Direction	ft	m	Surface
16/34	2,247	685	Coral
- Sources: FAA PilotWeb NOTAM, Great Circle Mapper

Eua Airport (IATA: EUA, ICAO: NFTE), known in Tonga as Kaufana Airport, is an airport in ʻEua, Tonga. The airport is located 3 km (1.9 mi) southeast of the capital 'Ohonua. The airfield is an unsealed coral strip.

== Airlines and destinations ==
Lulutai Airlines connects ʻEua Airport to Fuaʻamotu International Airport (Nukuʻalofa).
