= Fuaʻamotu International Airport =

International airport in Tonga

Fuaʻamotu International Airport Malaʻe Vakapuna Fakavahaʻapuleʻanga Fuaʻamotu
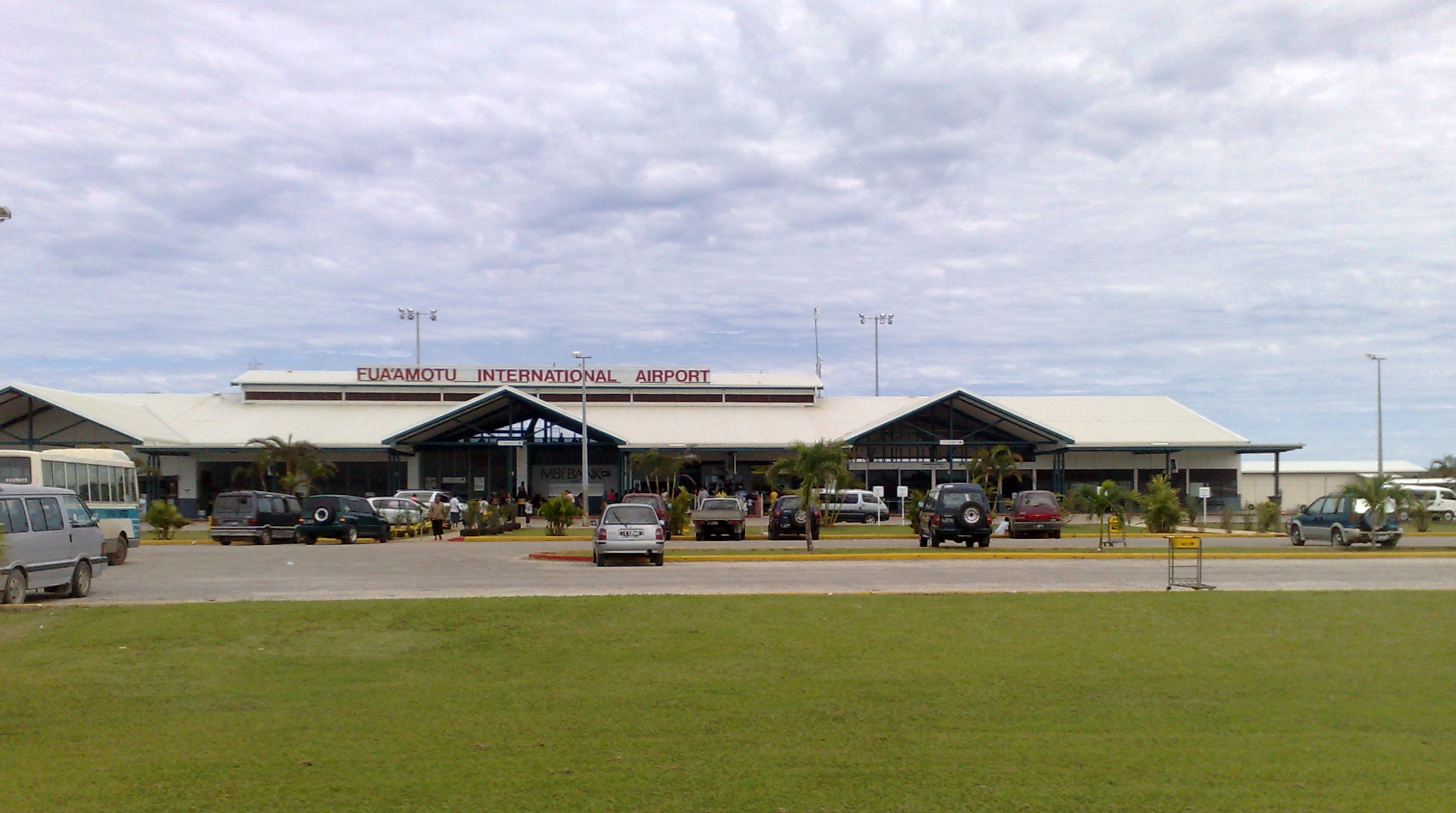
- IATA: TBU; ICAO: NFTF

Summary
- Airport type: Public
- Operator: Ministry of Civil Aviation
- Serves: Nukuʻalofa, Tonga
- Location: Tongatapu
- Elevation AMSL: 126 ft (38 m)
- Coordinates: 21°14′28″S 175°08′58″W

Map
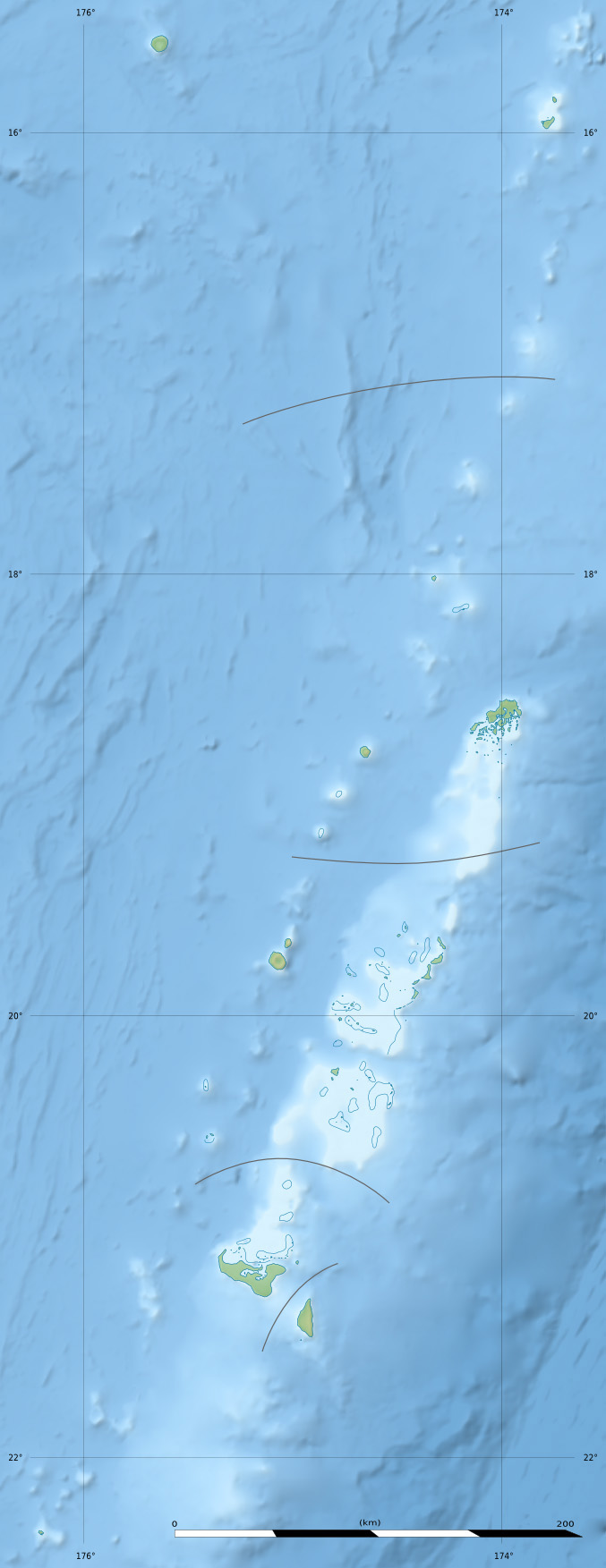
- Location of airport in Tonga NFTF (Oceania)

Runways
| Direction | Length | | Surface |
| Direction | ft | m | Surface |
|---|---|---|---|
| 11/29 | 8,795 | 2,681 | Asphalt |
| 17/35 | 4,951 | 1,509 | Grass/soil |

Fuaʻamotu International Airport (IATA: TBU, ICAO: NFTF) is an international airport in Tonga. It is on the south side of the main island, Tongatapu, 20 km from the capital of Tonga, Nukuʻalofa. Although named after the nearby village of Fuaʻamotu, which is on Tungī's (the king's) estate, in reality the airfield is located on the Tuʻi Pelehake's estate, closer to the village of Pelehake (which did not yet exist as a village during the early aviation days).

The air field was constructed by Seabees of the 1st Construction Battalion with assistance and labor of the U. S. Army 147th Infantry Regiment. It was intended as a World War II heavy bomber field, and had three coral-surfaced runways. In the late 1970s, it was expanded to permit jet aircraft to use the runways. Fuaʻamotu is now suitable for up to Boeing 767 size aircraft, but remains closed to larger jets (e.g. Boeing 747s).

Fuaʻamotu International Airport is equipped with VOR/DME (114.5) and NDB (245) navigational facilities. No ILS is available. Lighting is provided for the runway, apron, and taxiway. International airlines with regular services to Fuaʻamotu include Air New Zealand and Fiji Airways. Fiji Airways flies Boeing 737-800 aircraft from Nadi and ATR 42-600 aircraft from Suva (operated by Fiji Link). Air New Zealand flies Airbus A320neo, Boeing 777 and Boeing 787 aircraft from Auckland. In March 2016, Air New Zealand announced plans to serve Fuaʻamotu with a one-off Boeing 787-9s for the Auckland–Tonga route due to demand on June 15, 2016. Virgin Australia flew a Boeing 737-800 from Sydney and Auckland until services were withdrawn in 2020. Under Tongan law, Fuaʻamotu International Airport is closed on Sundays — only to be opened in distress, after the minister's approval.

== Air traffic control ==
Fuaʻamotu is a total controlled aerodrome and all traffic is guided by air traffic control. The tower is contactable on 118.5, and Ground on 121.9. Outside of the hours of service at Fuaʻamotu a limited FIS is available by Auckland Oceanic.

Runway 11/29 (elev 91 ft/28m): PCN 45 FBXT (flexible pavement, medium subgrade strength, medium tyre pressure (1,500 kPa (220 psi)), technical evaluation completed). Runway end identifier lights are installed at each end of the runway, as are T-VASI glidescope indicators. Low intensity runway lighting is provided, and a simple low intensity lighting approach lighting system is installed on Runway 11.

== Size restrictions ==
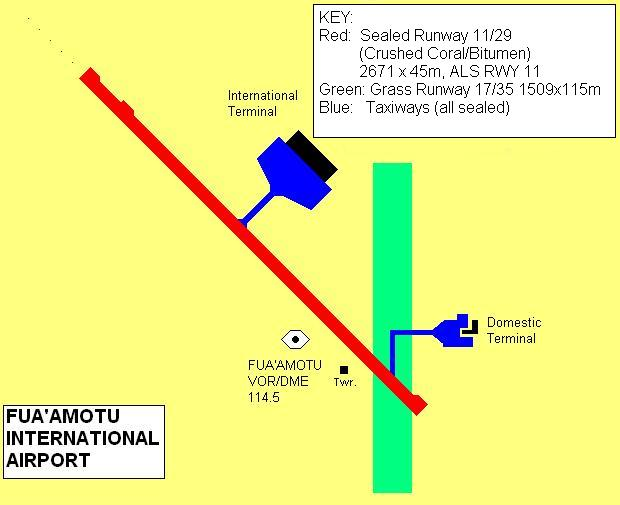
Map of Fuaʻamotu International Airport

It is the strength of the runway rather than the length that restricts operations from Fuaʻamotu. Even a fully laden Boeing 767-300ER on a flexible pavement B strength, such as at this airport, requires a Pavement Classification Number (PCN) of 59, therefore is not allowed to take off with full load. The same can be said of a Boeing 747-400, which theoretically could take off and land at Fuaʻamotu length-wise, but needs a PCN of 66, and would therefore damage the runway severely in the process (A B747-400 weighs over twice as much as a B767-300ER).

== Ground transport ==
There is no public bus service to the airport, but several hostels and hotels in Nukuʻalofa meet flights, and taxis are available.

== Airlines and destinations ==
| Airlines | Destinations |
|---|---|
| Air New Zealand | Auckland |
| Fiji Airways | Nadi |
| Lulutai Airlines | 'Eua, Ha'apai, Niuafoʻou, Niuatoputapu, Vava'u |
| Qantas | Sydney |

== See also ==
- Transport in Tonga
- List of airports in Tonga
