= Tolson River =

Coordinates: 46.897431°S 167.959879°E

Location
- Country: New Zealand

The Tolson River is a river in Stewart Island, New Zealand. A tributary of Freshwater River, it rises north of Mount Rakeahua and flows into that river near its outlet into Paterson Inlet.

== See also ==
- List of rivers of New Zealand
