= Freshwater River =

River on Stewart Island / Rakiura, New Zealand

Coordinates: 46°54′S 167°58′E

Location
- Country: New Zealand

Physical characteristics
- Source
  - location: Stewart Island
- Mouth
  - location: Paterson Inlet

The Freshwater River is the longest river on Stewart Island, the third largest of New Zealand's islands. It arises close to the island's northwestern point, from which it is separated by a ridge, and flows southeastward for 25 kilometres (16 mi) before reaching the Paterson Inlet on the island's central east coast. The catchment includes much of the island's north, with tributaries on the southern slopes of Mount Anglem and the eastern slopes of the Ruggedy Mountain area.

The river flows through the Ruggedy Flat wetland, an area of 10,148 ha (25,080 acres) that is classified by Manaaki Whenua Landcare Research as a wetland ecosystem of national significance for its biodiversity. The Freshwater River valley covers some 150 square kilometres (58 mi^{2}) (almost a tenth of the island's total area) including the majority of the flat land on Stewart Island. The valley includes wetland, wire rush peat-lands, acid bog, pools, red tussock areas, mānuka shrub and patches of podocarp forest, and supports diverse birdlife including the Stewart Island fernbird (mātātā) and Stewart Island robin (toutouwai). The valley also contains the southernmost kahikatea forest in New Zealand.

The mudflats in Paterson Inlet at the mouth of the Freshwater River are one of the most important feeding areas on Stewart Island for the critically endangered Southern New Zealand dotterel.

Freshwater River is navigable at high tide from Paterson Inlet and is used by water taxi services to transport walkers to Freshwater Landing, at the junction of the Southern Circuit and Northwest Circuit walking tracks. The Southern Circuit tramping track runs along the lower reach of the river.

== Works cited ==
- "Stewart Island/Rakiura Conservation Management Strategy and Rakiura National Park Management Plan" (PDF). Department of Conservation. March 2012.
