= Oban, New Zealand =

Town in Stewart Island, New Zealand

Oban Pā nui o Hau (Māori)
- Town
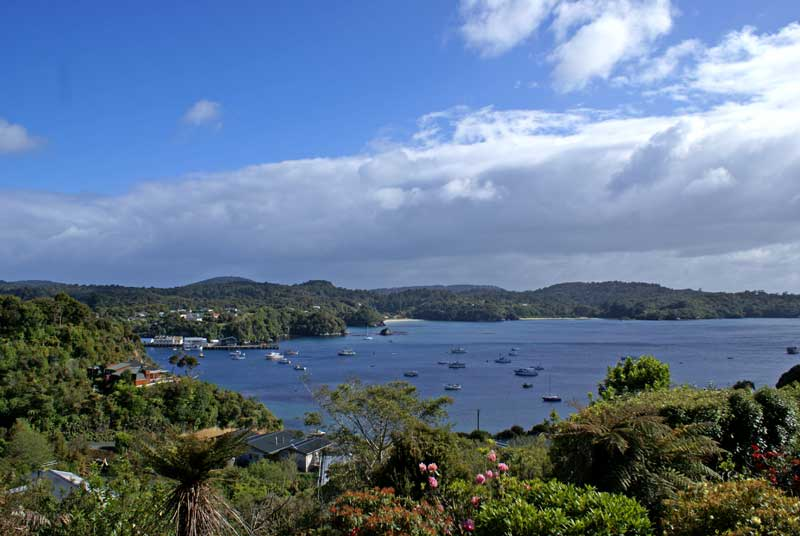
- Overlooking Oban and Halfmoon Bay
- Interactive map of Oban
- Coordinates: 46°54′S 168°08′E
- Country: New Zealand
- Region: Southland Region
- Territorial authorities of New Zealand: Southland District
- Ward: Stewart Island/Rakiura Ward
- Community: Stewart Island/Rakiura Ward Community
- Electorates: Invercargill; Te Tai Tonga (Māori)

Government
  - Territorial authority: Southland District Council
  - Regional council: Southland Regional Council
  - Mayor of Southland: Rob Scott
  - Invercargill MP: Penny Simmonds
  - Te Tai Tonga MP: Mananui Ramsden

Area
  - Total: 2.59 km^{2} (1.00 sq mi)

Population (June 2025)
  - Total: 380
  - Density: 150/km^{2} (380/sq mi)

Oban is the principal settlement on Stewart Island, the southernmost inhabited island of the New Zealand archipelago. Oban is centred on Halfmoon Bay (sometimes used as an alternative name for the town), and stretches over a peninsula to Paterson Inlet. It has aircraft connections with Invercargill and a ferry service to Bluff, both on the mainland South Island.

The settlement was named after Oban in Scotland (An t-Òban in Scottish Gaelic, meaning The Little Bay), due to the strong influence Scottish settlers had in the south of early colonial New Zealand.

The island has received a moderate boost of commerce and some millions in government funding since tourism increased markedly after the opening of the Rakiura National Park.

It is possible to see kākā during the day and kiwi during the night in Oban. Efforts have been made to eradicate many of the introduced predators of native birds in Oban, such as stoats and domestic cats, with bigger plans to target possums, three species of rat, and hedgehogs.

== Demographics ==
Oban is described by Statistics New Zealand as a rural settlement. It covers 2.59 km^{2} (1.00 sq mi), and had an estimated population of 380 as of June 2025, with a population density of 147 people per km^{2}. It is part of the wider Stewart Island statistical area.

Historical population
Year	Pop.	±% p.a.
2006	291	—
2013	273	−0.91%
2018	300	+1.90%

Oban had a population of 300 at the 2018 New Zealand census, an increase of 27 people (9.9%) since the 2013 census, and an increase of 9 people (3.1%) since the 2006 census. There were 165 households, comprising 156 males and 144 females, giving a sex ratio of 1.08 males per female, with 33 people (11.0%) aged under 15 years, 51 (17.0%) aged 15 to 29, 144 (48.0%) aged 30 to 64, and 69 (23.0%) aged 65 or older.

Ethnicities were 92.0% European/Pākehā, 19.0% Māori, 1.0% Pasifika, 1.0% Asian, and 1.0% other ethnicities. People may identify with more than one ethnicity.

Although some people chose not to answer the census's question about religious affiliation, 65.0% had no religion, 26.0% were Christian, 1.0% were Buddhist and 3.0% had other religions.

Of those at least 15 years old, 66 (24.7%) people had a bachelor's or higher degree, and 45 (16.9%) people had no formal qualifications. 39 people (14.6%) earned over $70,000 compared to 17.2% nationally. The employment status of those at least 15 years old was that 150 (56.2%) people were employed full-time, 42 people (15.7%) were part-time, and 3 (1.1%) were unemployed.

== Climate ==
The centre of Oban, 2025

The Köppen-Geiger climate classification system classifies its climate as a mid-latitude oceanic (Cfb). Temperatures are mild to cool year-round, with average high temperatures ranging from 17.2 °C (63.0 °F) in January, the warmest month, to 9.9 °C (49.8 °F) in July, the coolest month. The strong oceanic influence here results in small temperature variations. The diurnal temperature variation is quite low, around 7–8 °C (13–14 °F) year-long, and seasonal temperature variation (the difference between the warmest and coldest months) is about 7 °C (13 °F). Precipitation averages 1,490 mm (58.65 in) per year, and is evenly distributed far across the year (see climate chart). Year-round, Oban lies in the direct path of mid-latitude cyclones (low-pressure systems, or depressions) arriving from the Southern Ocean, generally moving from southwest to northeast, or west to east. As such, the climate is predominantly windy, cloudy and rainy; clear days and days with calm to minimal wind are rare.

Climate data for Oban, Stewart Island (1991–2020 normals, extremes 1975–present)
Month	Jan	Feb	Mar	Apr	May	Jun	Jul	Aug	Sep	Oct	Nov	Dec	Year
Record high °C (°F)	30.6 (87.1)	28.5 (83.3)	26.5 (79.7)	29.0 (84.2)	20.5 (68.9)	17.5 (63.5)	16.0 (60.8)	17.1 (62.8)	21.3 (70.3)	25.0 (77.0)	26.5 (79.7)	28.5 (83.3)	30.6 (87.1)
Mean daily maximum °C (°F)	17.6 (63.7)	17.5 (63.5)	16.2 (61.2)	14.4 (57.9)	12.4 (54.3)	10.4 (50.7)	10.1 (50.2)	10.8 (51.4)	12.5 (54.5)	13.6 (56.5)	14.9 (58.8)	16.7 (62.1)	13.9 (57.1)
Daily mean °C (°F)	13.6 (56.5)	13.5 (56.3)	12.3 (54.1)	10.7 (51.3)	9.0 (48.2)	7.0 (44.6)	6.5 (43.7)	7.2 (45.0)	8.6 (47.5)	9.7 (49.5)	10.9 (51.6)	12.7 (54.9)	10.1 (50.3)
Mean daily minimum °C (°F)	9.6 (49.3)	9.5 (49.1)	8.4 (47.1)	7.0 (44.6)	5.7 (42.3)	3.6 (38.5)	2.8 (37.0)	3.7 (38.7)	4.8 (40.6)	5.7 (42.3)	7.0 (44.6)	8.7 (47.7)	6.4 (43.5)
Record low °C (°F)	1.0 (33.8)	0.9 (33.6)	0.7 (33.3)	−0.4 (31.3)	−6 (21)	−7.3 (18.9)	−6 (21)	−7 (19)	−4.5 (23.9)	−1.8 (28.8)	−0.4 (31.3)	0.6 (33.1)	−7.3 (18.9)
Average rainfall mm (inches)	138.4 (5.45)	106.9 (4.21)	139.3 (5.48)	118.7 (4.67)	155.3 (6.11)	139.6 (5.50)	130.8 (5.15)	116.0 (4.57)	122.8 (4.83)	146.5 (5.77)	134.4 (5.29)	116.3 (4.58)	1,565 (61.61)
Average rainy days (≥ 1.0 mm)	15.3	13.6	15.4	16.0	17.9	17.8	17.0	16.5	16.0	17.0	17.0	16.1	195.5
Average relative humidity (%)	84.3	87.4	87.4	89.4	91.1	90.9	91.3	89.9	85.0	84.3	81.6	82.6	85.8
Source: NIWA (rainy days and humidity 1975–2015)

== Rakiura Museum ==
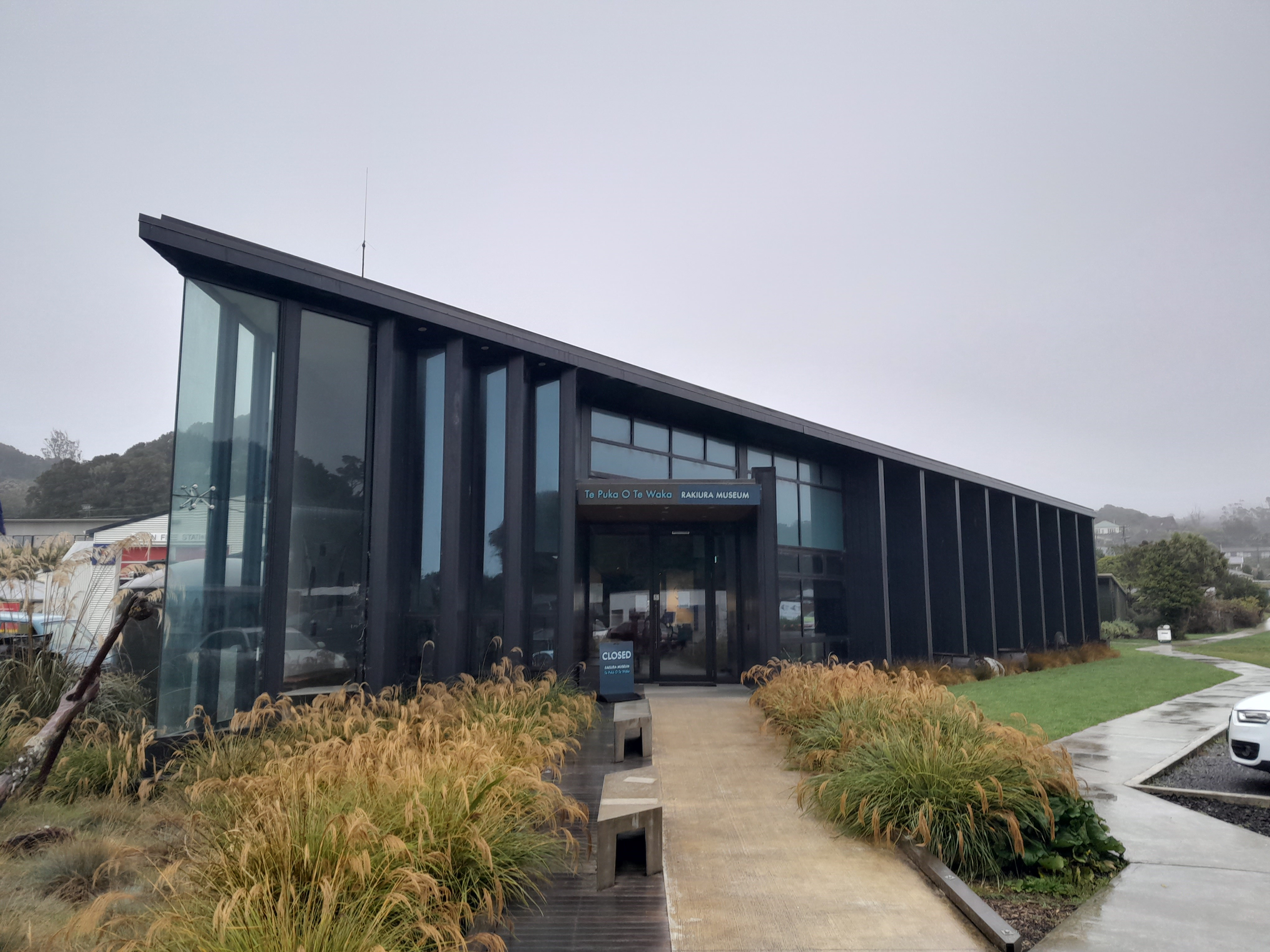
Rakiura Museum, 2023

The Rakiura Museum was first opened in 1960 in a converted house. It was reopened in December 2020 in a purpose-built $3 million building in December 2020. It contains artifacts and displays including the history of whaling and sealing around Stewart Island, boat building, Māori settlement and natural history of Stewart Island.

== Transport ==
=== Ferry services ===
The ferry journey across Foveaux Strait between Bluff Harbour on the South Island and Oban is about 39 km (21 nmi) long. The present high speed catamaran service typically takes one hour. As of 2024, the ferry service is operated by the tourism company RealNZ (formerly Real Journeys).

=== Air services ===
Stewart Island Flights provides air services across Foveaux Strait between Invercargill Airport and Ryan's Creek Aerodrome above Oban. Their aircraft also land on the sand at Mason Bay, Doughboy Bay, and West Ruggedy Beach.

== Education ==
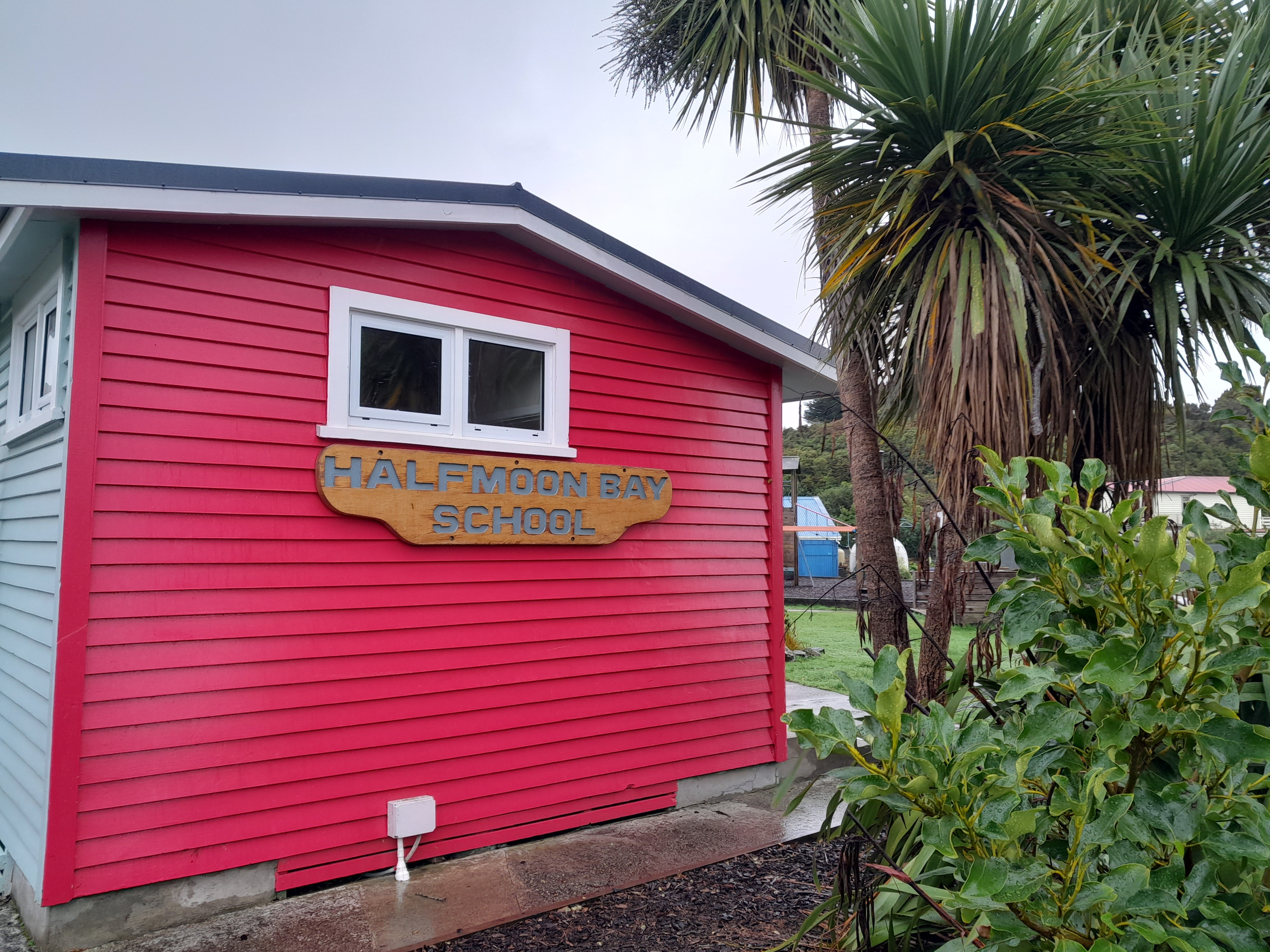
Halfmoon Bay School, 2023

Halfmoon Bay School / Te Kura o Rakiura caters for years 1 to 8 with a roll of 31 students as of July 2026. The school was established in 1874.

== Churches ==
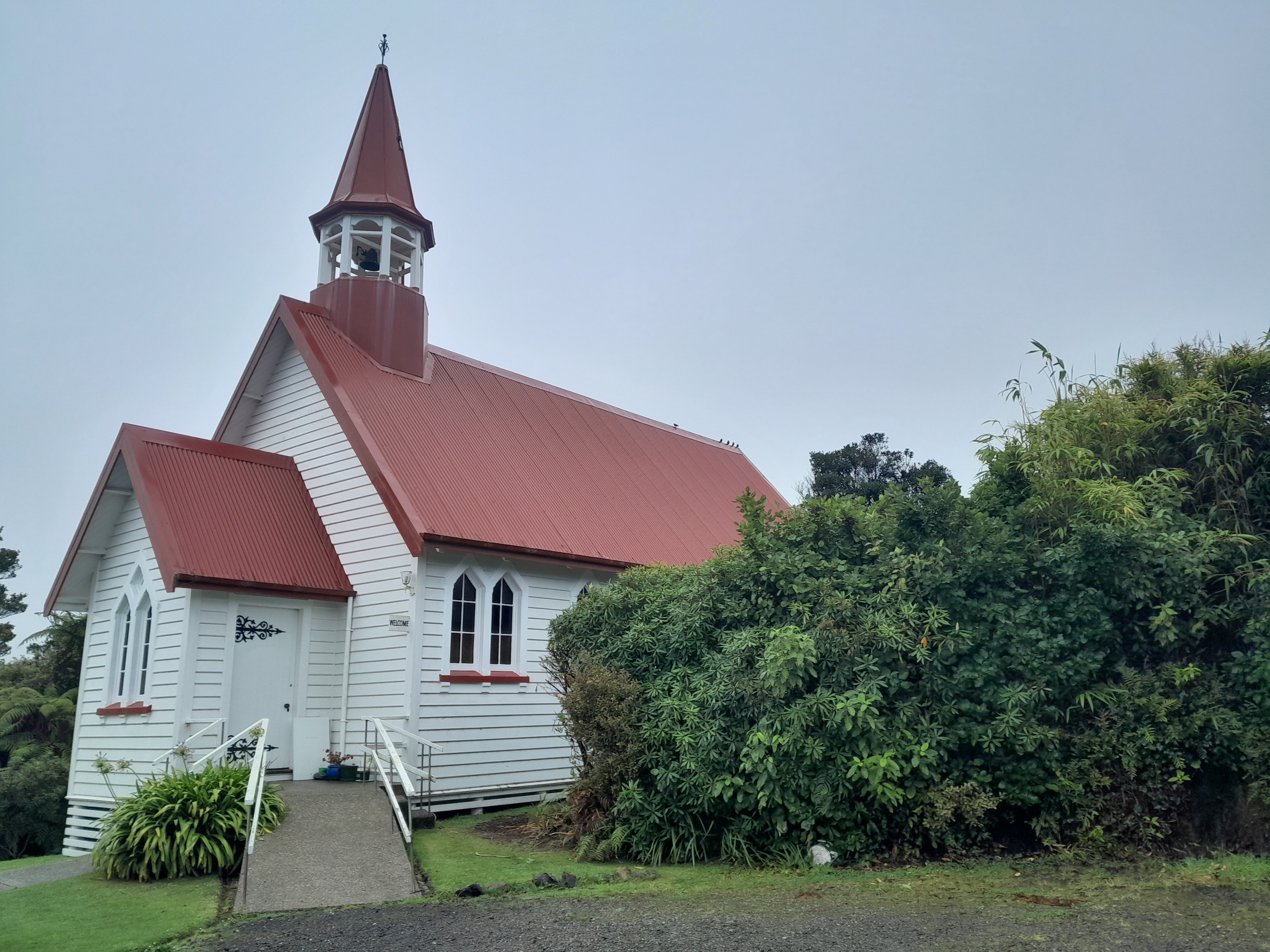
Oban Presbyterian Church, 2023

Oban Presbyterian Church was built in 1904. Electric lighting was installed in 1957. It is located on Kamahi Road and overlooks Halfmoon Bay. It has no resident minister, but has visiting preachers.

St Andrews Anglican Church is situated at 10 Excelsior Road. Prince Harry visited St Andrews in 2015.
