= NZRC =

NZRC may refer to:

- New Zealand Railways Corporation, New Zealand railway company
- New Zealand Rally Championship, New Zealand's leading rallying championship
- NZRC, the ICAO airport code for Ryan's Creek Aerodrome, Stewart Island, New Zealand
