= Bravo Island =

Island in New Zealand

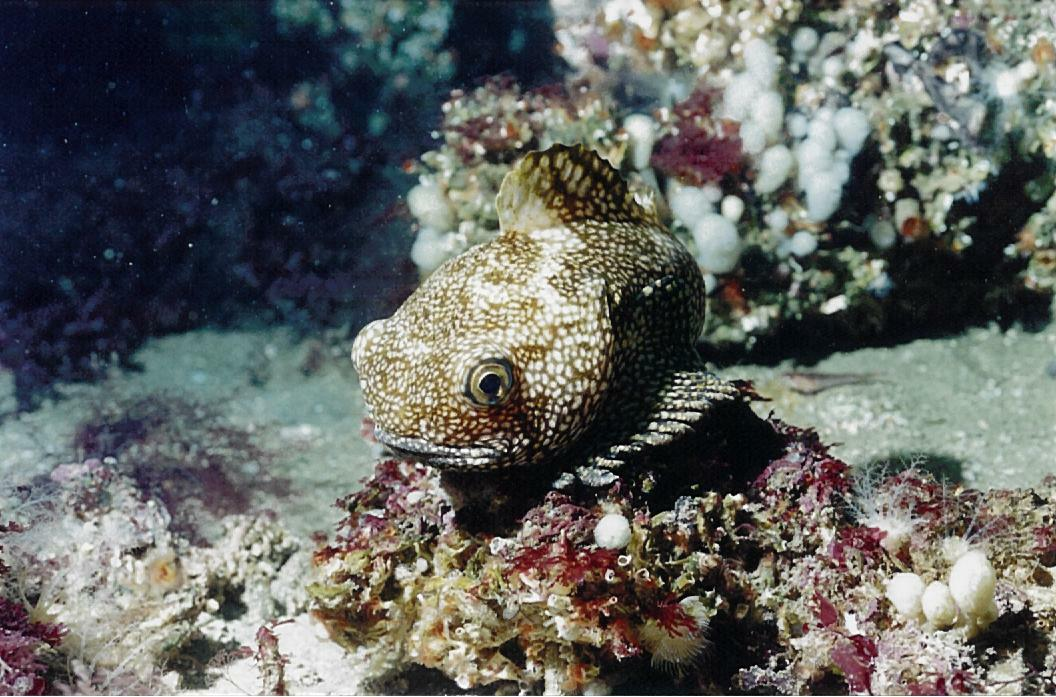
- Dark toadfish at Bravo Island

Geography
- Location: Stewart Island
- Coordinates: 46.96175°S 168.136056°E

Administration
- New Zealand
- Region: Southland

Demographics
- Population: uninhabited

Bravo Island is an island on the east of Stewart Island, New Zealand. It sits in the junction between Big Glory Bay and Paterson Inlet.

== See also ==
- List of islands of New Zealand
