= Ulva Island (New Zealand) =

Island in New Zealand

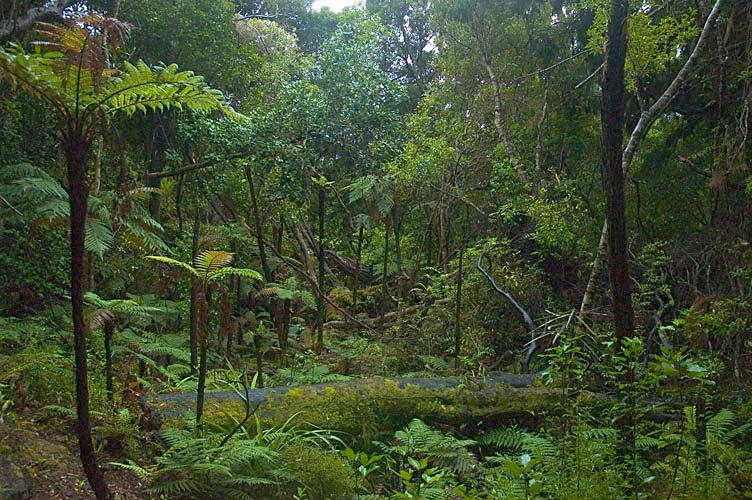
- Temperate rainforest on Ulva Island
- Interactive map of Ulva Island

Geography
- Location: Paterson Inlet
- Coordinates: 46.934°S 168.131°E
- Area: 2.7 km^{2} (1.0 sq mi)
- Length: 3.5 km (2.17 mi)

Administration
- New Zealand

Demographics
- Population: 0

Ulva Island (from Scottish Gaelic: Eilean na Ulbha) is a small island about 3.5 km (2.17 mi) long lying within Paterson Inlet, which is part of Stewart Island in New Zealand. The Māori name for the island is Te Wharawhara.

== Geography ==
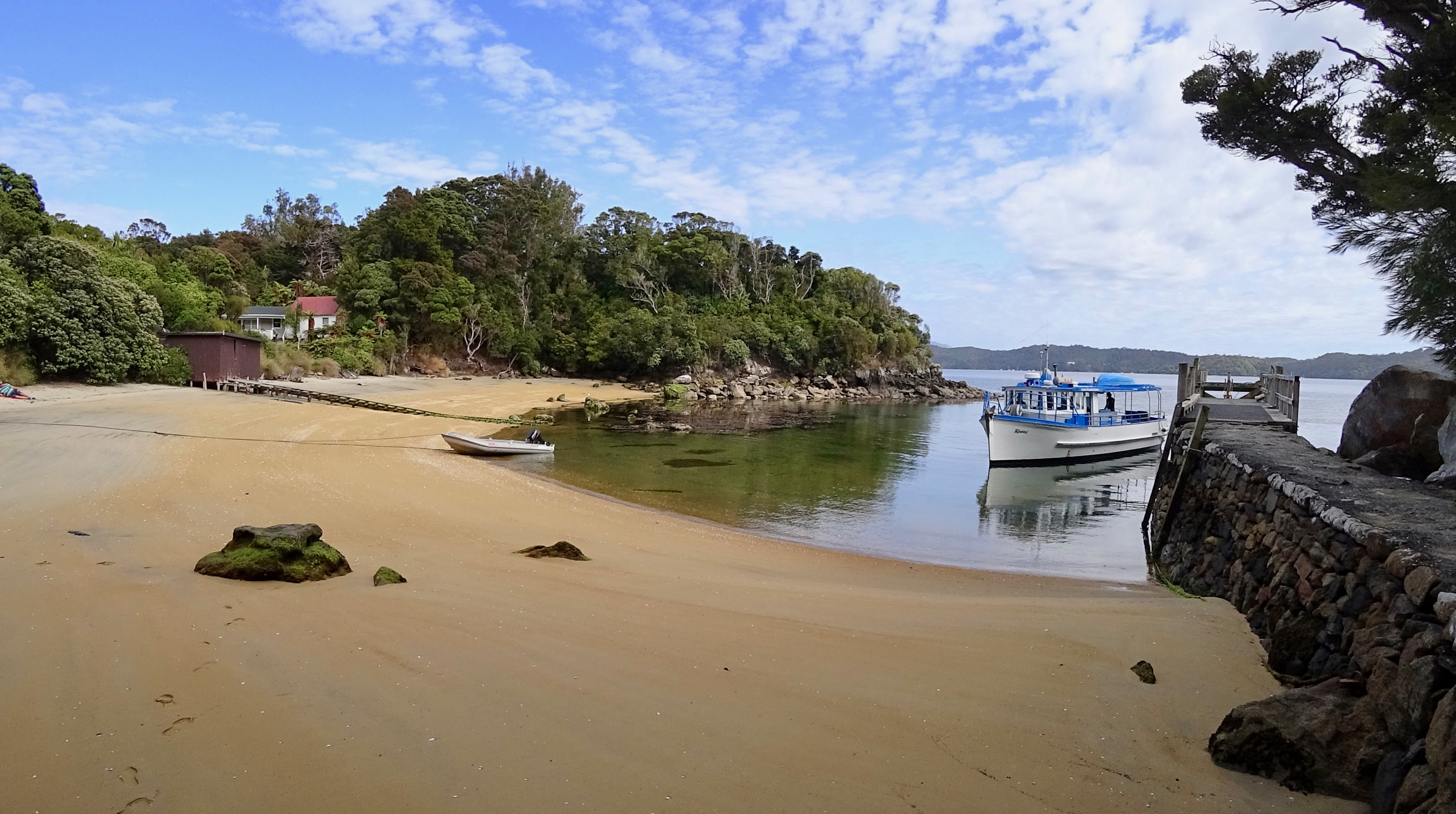
Ulva Island Post Office Bay, wharf area with ferry

It has an area of 267 hectares (660 acres), of which almost all 261 hectares (640 acres) is part of Rakiura National Park. It was named after the island of Ulva in the Inner Hebrides of Scotland, and was formerly called Coopers Island.

== Biodiversity ==
A South Island saddleback on Ulva Island, where they were first released in 2000. A population of South Island saddlebacks is maintained on the island by the University of Otago.

Ulva Island's relative isolation, but easy access from Stewart Island has allowed it to become an important natural resource area. It is a sanctuary for both birds and plants, holding species that on the mainland of New Zealand are rare or have died out. In 1997, the island was declared rat-free, following an eradication programme, and extirpated birds have been reintroduced to the island. The birds include the South Island saddleback (tīeke), yellowhead (mohua) and Stewart Island robin. Other birds on the island that are rare on the mainland include the Stewart Island subspecies of southern brown kiwi (tokoeka), rifleman (tititipounamu), yellow-crowned and red-fronted parakeet, and South Island kākā or forest parrot, as well as several other species. The endangered yellow-eyed penguin uses the island for breeding sites.

The shortest distance across the water from Rakiura to Ulva Island is around 800 metres (2,600 ft), and this is within the swimming range of Norway rats. There have been more than 20 rat incursions detected between 1997 and 2022. The gestation period of Norway rats is 3 weeks, so a population can build up quickly. In 2022, the Department of Conservation announced that a rat incursion in February had not been successfully contained, and that rats had spread to other parts of the island, posing a significant threat to the most vulnerable species on the island. The Predator Free Rakiura trust commented that the discovery of rats on Ulva Island provided support for the need to eradicate predators on mainland Rakiura.

The Department of Conservation currently maintains the public portion of the island including its predator free status. A small portion of the island (approximately 8 hectares or 20 acres between Sydney Cove and Post Office Bay) is privately owned.

The liverwort species Lophocolea mediinfrons is thought to be endemic to northeastern Ulva Island.

== Tourism ==
Walking track on Ulva Island

Ulva Island is a major drawcard for visitors to Stewart Island, with regular water taxi services operating from Golden Bay wharf on Stewart Island. Water taxis typically take less than 10 minutes for the journey between Golden Bay Wharf and the wharf on Ulva Island. The island has no roads or accommodation, but well-formed easy walking tracks connecting Sydney Cove, Boulder Beach and West End Beach, all on the western half of the island and offering walking options from 20 minutes to 3 hours.

On the island, visitors can see endangered birds not present on Stewart Island and rare on the main South Island, and are also likely to encounter sea lions on the coast or even venturing a short distance into the interior of the island on the walking tracks, and are advised to stay well clear of them. Feeding of wildlife, camping, and bringing pets is not allowed.

== See also ==
- List of islands of New Zealand
- List of islands
- Desert island
