= Rakiura National Park =

National park in New Zealand

- IUCN category II (national park)
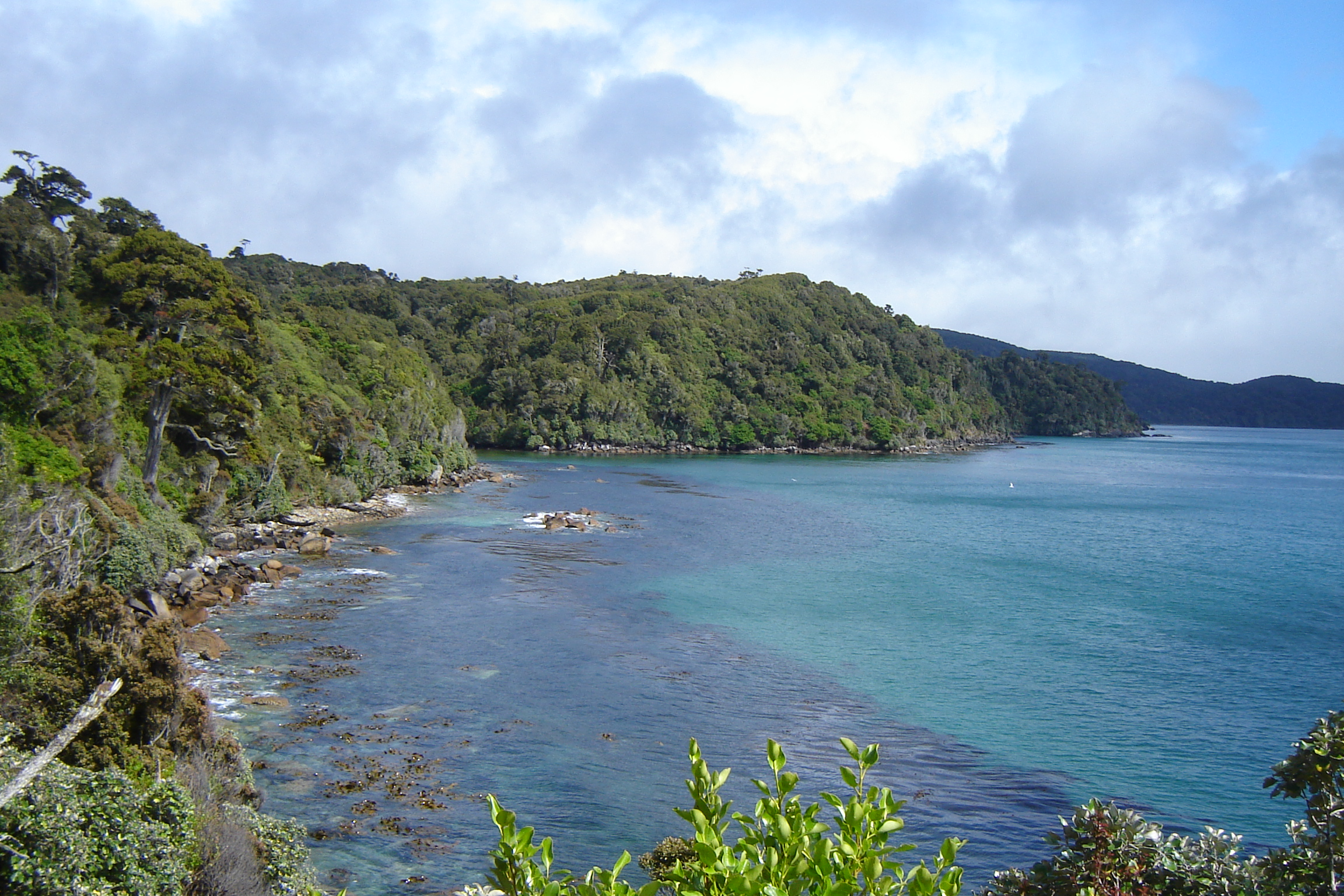
- Interactive map of Rakiura National Park
- Location: Stewart Island / Rakiura, New Zealand
- Nearest town: Oban
- Coordinates: 46°54′S 168°7′E
- Area: 1,399.6 km^{2} (540.4 sq mi)
- Established: 2002
- Governing body: Department of Conservation
- Website: Official website

Rakiura National Park is a nature reserve park located on Stewart Island / Rakiura, New Zealand. It is the newest national park of New Zealand and opened in 2002. The protected area covers about 85% of the island.

== History ==
=== Park establishment ===
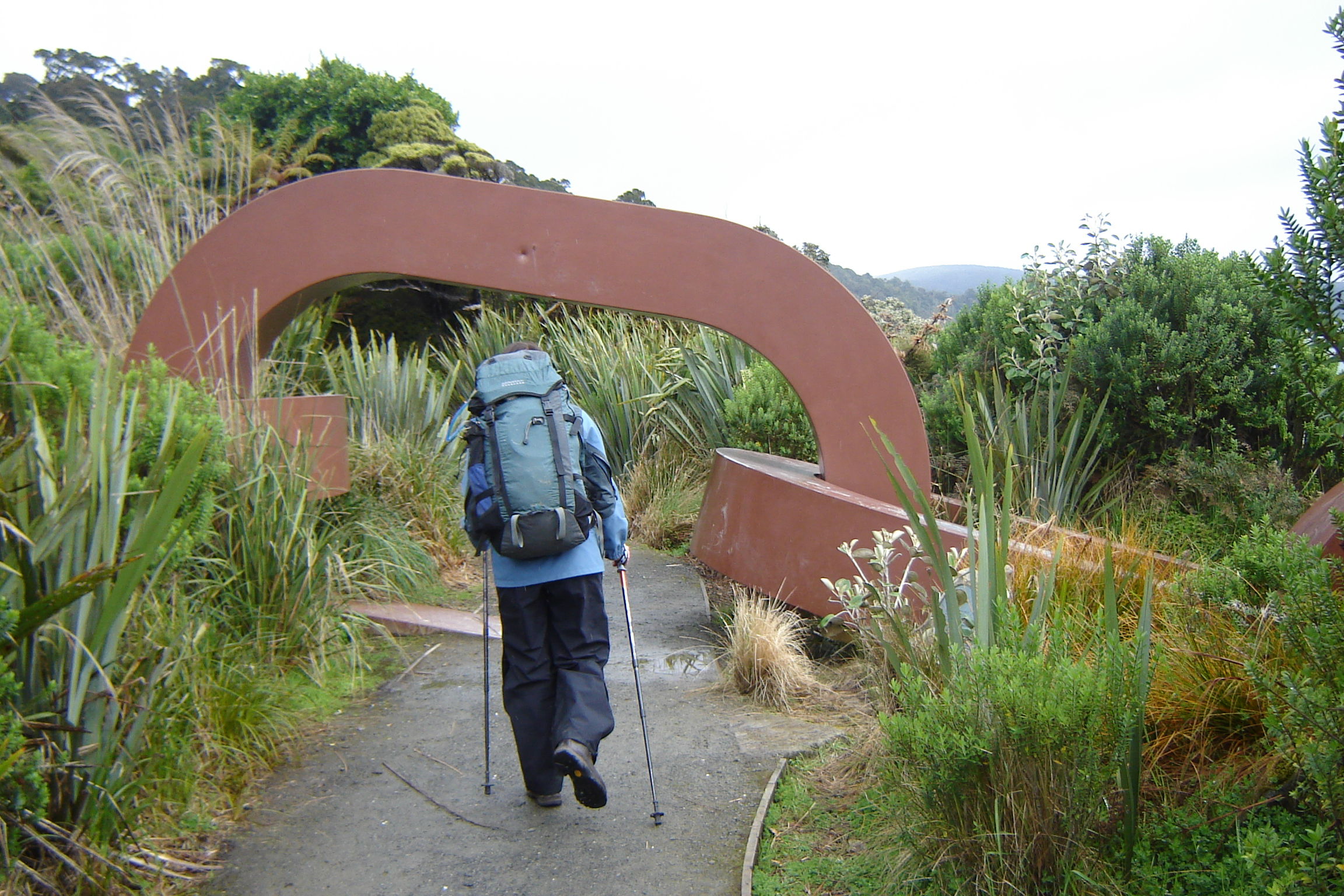
Robert Beck's Chain Sculpture, at the entrance to Rakiura National Park

Rakiura National Park is the 14th of New Zealand's national parks and was officially opened on 9 March 2002 by the Prime Minister, Helen Clark, the Minister of Conservation, Sandra Lee, and the mountaineer Sir Edmund Hillary. It is New Zealand's newest national park.

== Geography ==
Rakiura National Park covers close to 1,400 square kilometres (540 sq mi), which is about 85% of Stewart Island / Rakiura, New Zealand's third-largest island. The park area excludes the township area around Halfmoon Bay (Oban) and some roads as well as private or Māori-owned land further inland. It is made up of a network of former nature reserves, scenic reserves, and State Forest areas. A chain sculpture at the entrance to Rakiura National Park symbolises the Māori mythology of the island, which held that the South Island was the canoe of the demigod Māui and that Rakiura was the canoe's anchor, as evidenced by an alternative name for the island of "Te Punga o Te Waka a Māui" (the anchor of Māui's canoe). The sculpture was designed by noted Southland sculptor Russell Beck, and was unveiled as part of the opening of the national park. In 2008, a similar sculpture was erected in Bluff, and it represents the other end of the chain.

== Ecology ==
Near Port William Hut, North Coast

=== Fauna ===
Many native birds can be found within the park, and Rakiura offers perhaps the best opportunity anywhere in New Zealand for viewing kiwi in the wild. This is in part due to the absence of stoats and ferrets. Home to the Southern brown kiwi or Tokoeka, this is the largest of the kiwi species. There are thought to be around 15,000 kiwi on Stewart Island / Rakiura.

Certain coastal areas of this park are breeding areas for the endangered yellow-eyed penguin. Weka, a flightless and curious bird species, can only be found on offshore islands. The South Island kākā can commonly be seen near the town of Halfmoon Bay and Ulva Island.

In the 1970s, kākāpō were found in the Tin Range at a time when it was thought that the species was nearly extinct. The kākāpō have been transferred to nearby Codfish Island / Whenua Hou, which is not part of the national park.

== Tramping ==
=== Rakiura Track ===
Rakiura Track

The popular Rakiura Track is within the national park. The 32 kilometres (20 mi) long track typically takes three days and two nights to complete, and is of "Great Walk" standard, however, the middle section can be quite muddy. The track meanders through lowland kāmahi, tōtara and rimu forest. The track takes in Port William and the north arm of Paterson Inlet. Rakiura kiwi is often seen at night time near the huts.

=== Northwest Circuit ===
Northwest Circuit Track between Mason Bay and Freshwater River

The Northwest Circuit circumnavigates the northern and western aspects of Stewart Island. The track is 125 kilometres (78 mi) long and takes most people between eight and ten days to complete, but can be challenging due to widespread, deep mud. Most of the track is along the coastline visiting a series of very isolated sandy beaches. Once it reaches Mason Bay, the track crosses the Freshwater Depression before reaching Paterson Inlet. There are ten huts on the track which are, in general, spaced between five and seven hours walk apart.

Mason Bay can also be reached by continuing west from Rakiura Track's North Arm Hut, and Stewart Island Flights offers flights to and from Mason Bay, including a day trip option where passengers are flown from Oban to Mason Bay, landing on the beach, and walk back to Freshwater Hut for a pick up and return to Oban by boat.

=== Southern Circuit ===
The Southern Circuit is a challenging nine-day tramping trip. It is 70 kilometres (43 mi) long, and after rain can involve long periods of walking in mud and deep water. The Southern Circuit takes in Doughboy Bay Hut. This eight-bed hut is the southernmost hut in the Department of Conservation's network.

== See also ==
- National parks of New Zealand
- Forest parks of New Zealand
- Tramping in New Zealand
- Protected areas of New Zealand
