= Mount Anglem =

Mountain in New Zealand

Mount Anglem / Hananui
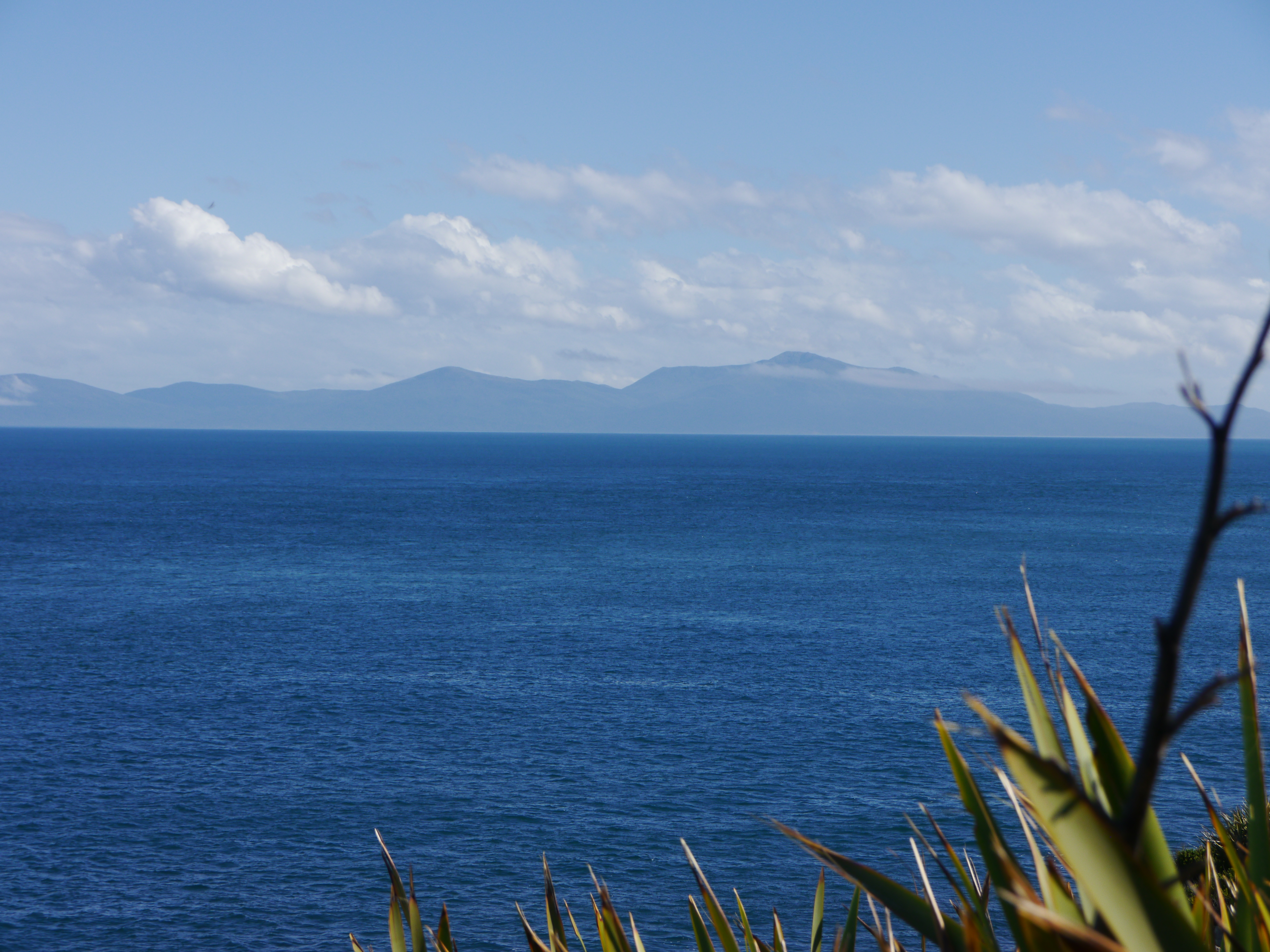
- Mount Anglem seen from The Bluff

Highest point
- Elevation: 980 m (3,220 ft)
- Prominence: 980 m (3,220 ft)
- Coordinates: 46°44′26″S 167°54′59″E

Geography
- Location within New Zealand
- Location: Stewart Island / Rakiura, New Zealand

Mount Anglem / Hananui is the highest point on New Zealand's Stewart Island / Rakiura. It is located 20 kilometres (12 mi) northwest of Oban, close to the island's north coast, and rises to an elevation of 980 metres (3,215 ft) above sea level. Following the passage of the Ngāi Tahu Claims Settlement Act 1998, the name of the peak was officially altered to Mount Anglem / Hananui.

Views from Mount Anglem include those inland looking west onto the floodplains. The southern tip of the South Island is visible on a clear day.
