= Paterson Inlet =

Large forested harbour in Stewart Island, New Zealand

Paterson Inlet / Whaka a Te Wera
- Paterson Inlet as seen from Observation Rock in Oban. Iona Island is visible just off shore.
- Interactive map of Paterson Inlet / Whaka a Te Wera
- Location: Stewart Island, New Zealand
- Coordinates: 46°56′24″S 168°05′27″E
- Type: Ria
- Etymology: Whaka a Te Wera after Te Wera, a local chief. Paterson Inlet has unclear origins.
- River sources: Rakeahua River, Freshwater River, Tolson River
- Basin countries: New Zealand
- Max. length: 16 kilometres (9.9 mi)
- Max. width: 6.3 kilometres (3.9 mi)
- Surface area: 100 square kilometres (39 sq mi)
- Max. depth: 45 metres (148 ft)
- Islands: Around 20 islands, including Ulva Island, Native Island, and Bravo Island
- Sections/sub-basins: Big Glory Bay, South West Arm, North Arm

Paterson Inlet (officially Paterson Inlet / Whaka a Te Wera) is a large natural harbour—specifically a ria—in the eastern coast of Stewart Island, New Zealand. Much of the land surrounding Paterson Inlet is unspoilt forest, and runoff into the harbour is especially clean.

== History ==
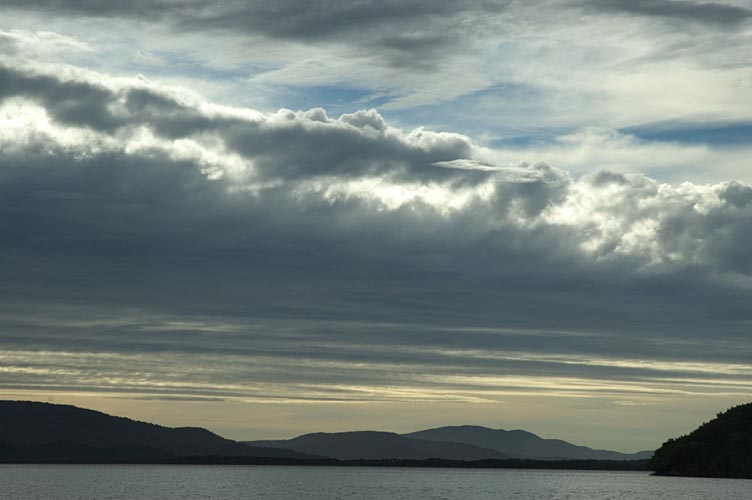
The inlet at sundown

This region was first inhabited by the Māori, who settled at a locale known as The Neck, which is a long peninsula that extends across the mouth of the inlet from the southern coast. The only town on Stewart Island, Oban is located on the north coast of the inlet, close to its mouth. In earlier times, the inlet was used as a base for whaling. Southern right whales were the main target in this area and over exploited. However, their sightings around the island are increasing recently.

View from Observation Point overlooking the inlet

== Geography ==
Paterson Inlet has three main arms; North Arm and South West Arm lie at the upper reaches of the inlet, 15 kilometres from its mouth. Big Glory Bay, the third arm of the inlet, lies behind The Neck in the southeast of the inlet. The inlet drains the Rakeahua and Freshwater Rivers, the latter of which drains a large swampy valley that covers much of the northern part of the island.

Several islands lie in the inlet, notably Ulva Island and Native Island.

== Fishing ==
In 2004, the majority of Paterson Inlet was made a mātaitai reserve, a type of marine reserve which prohibits commercial fishing while allowing customary rights to fish, as well as recreational fishing. The reserve, designated Te Whaka a Te Wera Mātaitai Reserve, does not cover the Ulva Island–Te Wharawhara Marine Reserve which was also created in 2004, but was designated a marine reserve to prohibit all fishing.
