= Dawson Farm Aerodrome =

Former aerodrome in Myross Bush, New Zealand

The Dawson Farm aerodrome was located at Myross Bush, New Zealand, northeast of the southern city of Invercargill. As the name suggests, the airfield was created by a local farming family for the eventual development into Invercargill's first public aerodrome in 1929. Local aviation enthusiasts as well as national aviation personalities such as George Bolt were visitors, bringing the still rare sight of aircraft into the region. At the time it was located a considerable distance from the town centre and city officials opted for a closer site, building a new airport on reclaimed land in the New River estuary in 1939, now today's Invercargill Airport. This was to encourage commercial services.

== Air Force use ==
The then New Zealand Permanent Airforce, later the RNZAF, were regular visitors right up to and including World War Two, commandeering it as a backup field in 1939 and enlarging the grass landing strip, although the aerodrome was never used as a permanent base and only for training and urgent communications. Aircraft included the Vickers Vincent light bomber of No. 2 General Reconnaissance Squadron which performed emergency maritime patrols in the area. The Airspeed Oxford was also flown from the temporary base. Once the new Invercargill Airport site construction finished, larger RNZAF-operated aircraft landed there instead.

At the end of hostilities in 1945, the RNZAF delisted the aerodrome from its use and returned the site to the city, which soon leased the land back to the local farming community.

== What's left? ==
Invercargill Airport's site was for many years prone to flooding. Three damaging floods took place within ten years, first in 1978, the largest and most damaging in 1984, and the last in 1987, forced the City Council to reconsider the Dawson Farm site for a new relocated airport. Although favoured by the city, costs were seen as prohibitive as it would have involve moving power pylons away from proposed approach vectors. A major flood protection scheme which the New Zealand Government would pay for was approved instead, and the Dawson Farm proposal was dropped.

The flat area of the aerodrome has now been turned over to intensive dairy farming, but 'Aerodrome Road' (located off McIvor Road) still give access to Invercargill's first airport site. Classed as a private right of way and signed 'no exit', officially the road dead-ends in a farmyard area, the site of Dawson Farm and air terminal, but actually carries on out to State Highway 98 between Lorneville and Dacre, with corresponding 'no exit' signs located at this end as well.
