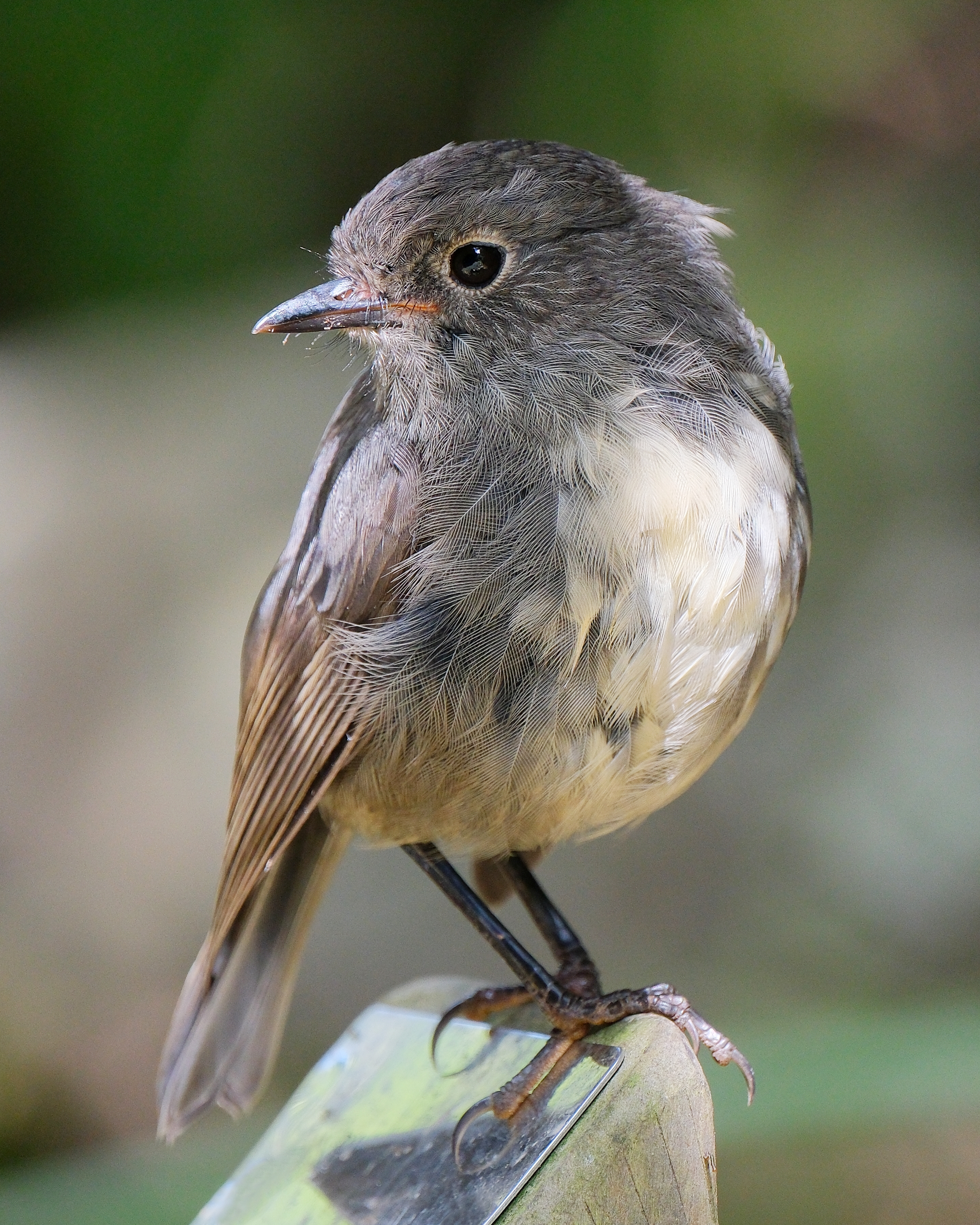

Conservation status
- Least Concern (IUCN 3.1)

Scientific classification
- Kingdom: Animalia
- Phylum: Chordata
- Class: Aves
- Order: Passeriformes
- Family: Petroicidae
- Genus: Petroica
- Species: P. australis

Binomial name
- Petroica australis (Sparrman, 1788)

= South Island robin =

Passerine species of bird native to New Zealand's South Island

The South Island robin (Petroica australis; also known in Māori as the kakaruai) is a sparrow-sized bird found only in New Zealand, where it has the status of a protected endemic species. The birds are sparsely distributed through the South Island and Stewart Island / Rakiura, although the distribution is not continuous. The nominate, and the Stewart Island robin (P. australis rakiura) are the two subspecies. The species is closely related to the North Island robin (formerly P. australis longipes, now considered a distinct species), and also to the extremely rare black robin (P. traversi) of the Chatham Islands.

== Taxonomy ==
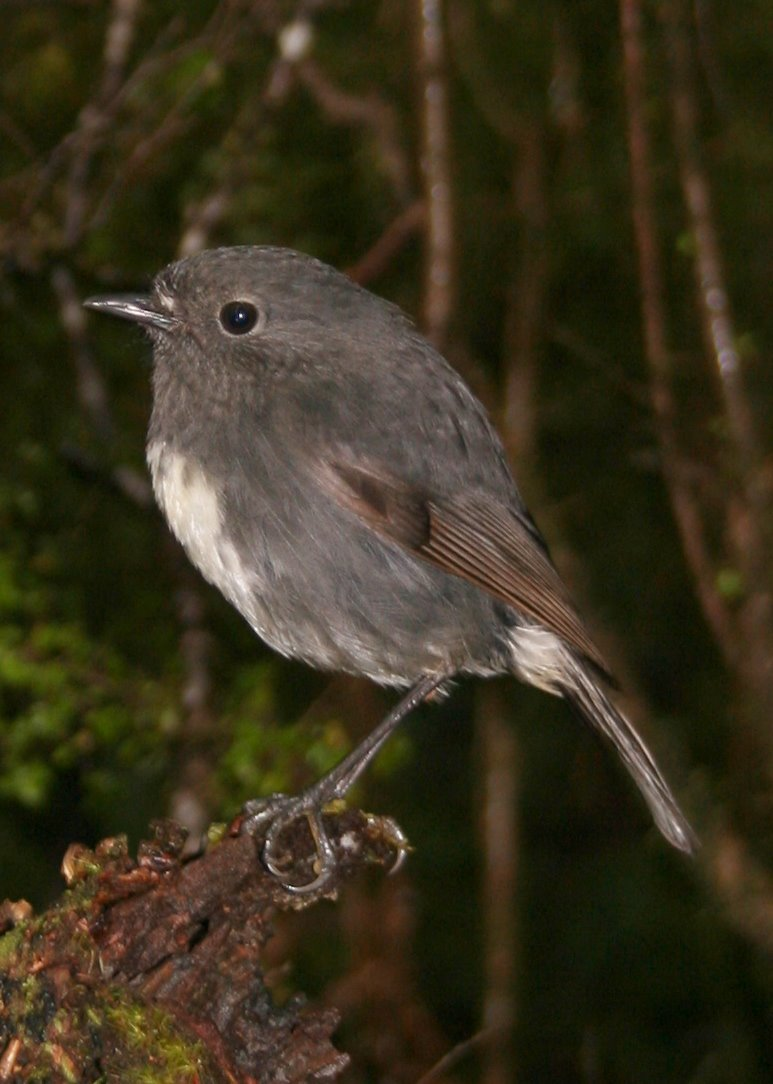
South Island robin

The South Island robin has two subspecies: P. australis australis, the nominate form, and P. australis rakiura, the Stewart Island robin. These subspecies do not overlap in their distributions. The North Island robin (P. longipes), the tomtit (Petroica macrocephala), and the black robin (Petroica traversi) in the Chatham Islands are closely related species. P. traversi seems to be a Chatham Island derivative of P. australis, although the position of the most recent common ancestor has yet to be determined. The family Petroicidae of Australasian robins has a total of 49 species, mostly in Australia, New Zealand, and New Guinea.

== Fossil record ==
There is molecular phylogenetic evidence to suggest two waves of immigration by the Petroica genus from Australia. P. longipes and P. australis can be traced to the first and P. macrocephala to the second wave. The evidence suggests that P. longipes and P. australis began to diverge prior to the Pleistocene era, and that the two South Island subspecies of P. australis began to diverge after the Pleistocene era. The separation time for the former was about three million years, and only 10,000 years (i.e., postglacial) for the latter. Fossils of New Zealand robins can sometimes be found near pit fall deposits, as they do most of their feeding/foraging on the ground. The fossil record also indicates the robins' presence throughout lowland New Zealand until drastic habitat reduction through deforestation by the Polynesian ancestors of the Māori and later European colonisers.

== Description ==
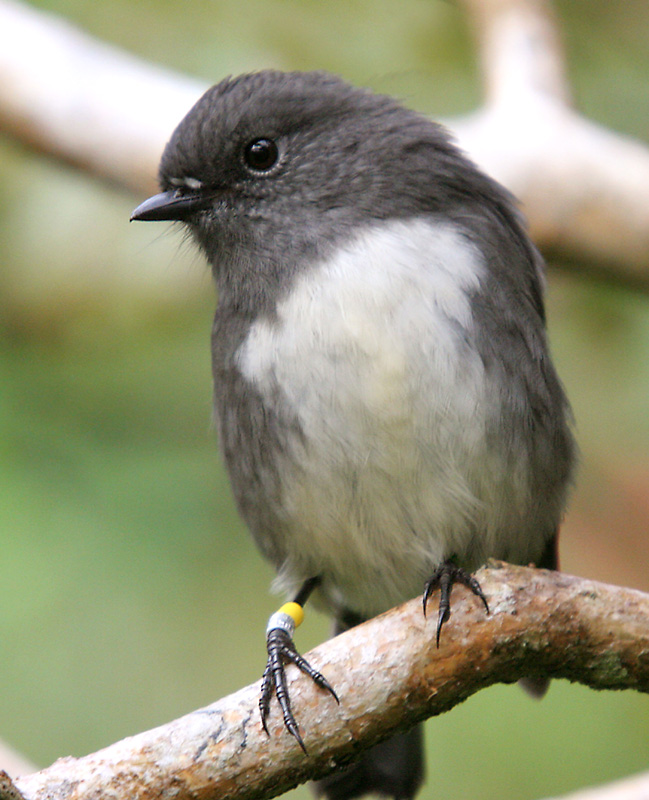
Stewart Island robin

The South Island robin is a small passerine, 10–18 cm in length and weighing around 35 g. North Island robins do resemble both females and juveniles of the South Island robins, as well as all the Stewart Island robins, which can sometimes make it difficult to distinguish between the three. The females and juveniles within a particular group of robins look similar to each other, although newly independent juveniles may not yet have the more lightly coloured breast patch. However, male North Island robins are almost black with a white spot just above the beak, as well as the greyish-white lower breast. Females and juveniles are greyer with more variable pale patches on their breasts and throats. Male South Island robins are dark grey, except for the distinct yellowish-white lower chest, while females and juveniles are again lighter grey with a less distinct breast. Finally, Stewart Island robins look similar to North Island robins (both males and females).

New Zealand robins are relatively long-lived; life-spans of at least 14 years have been recorded in the wild.

== Distribution ==
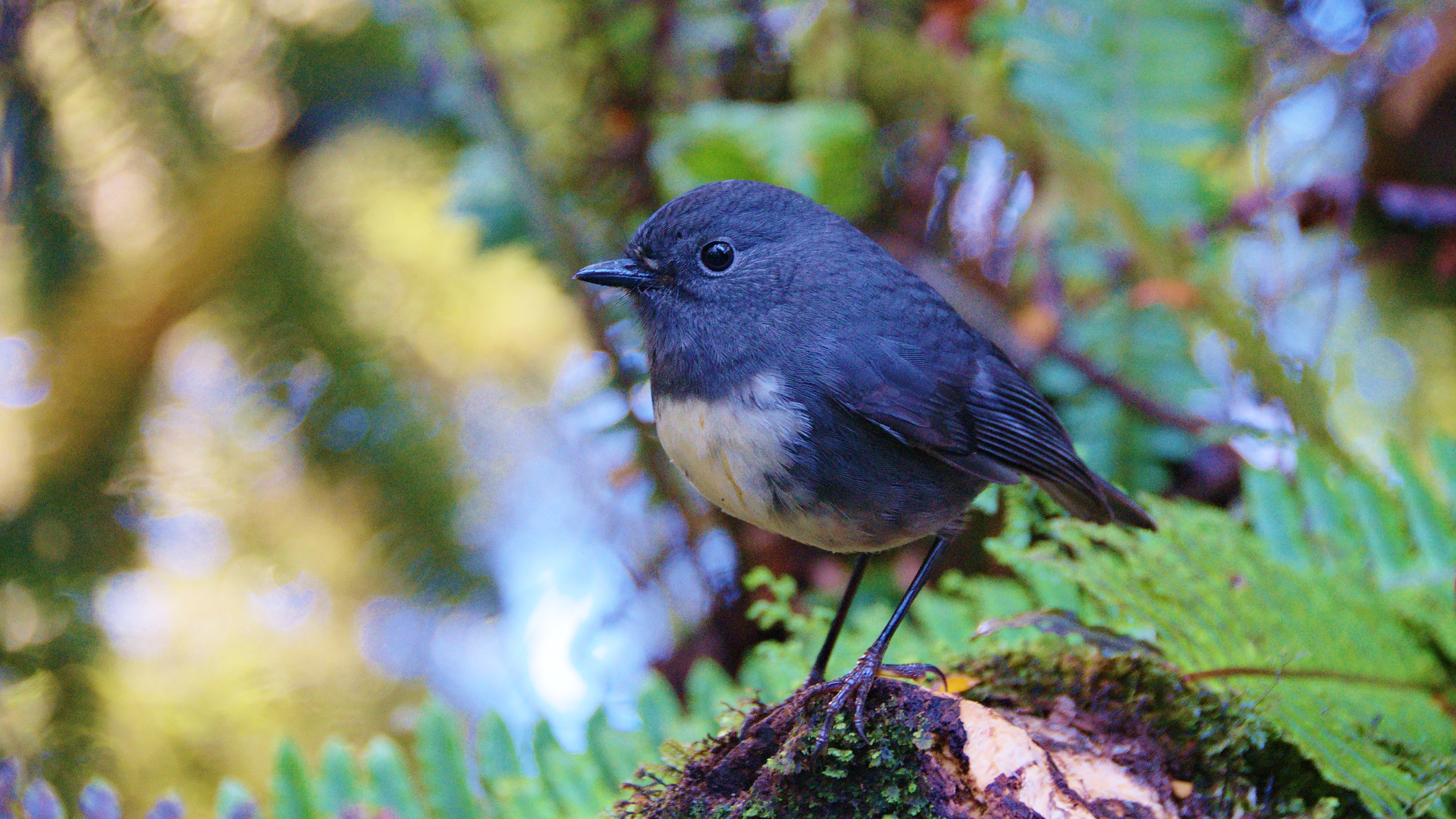
South Island robin, Southland District

Historically, the South Island robin inhabited much of the lowland of New Zealand's South Island, but its distribution has become much more patchy in the last century due to habitat loss and introduced predation. There are two populations on the east coast of the South Island, and they are slightly more common in the north and west. It has fared slightly better than the Stewart Island robin, which has been relegated to 3 subpopulations, all of which are in Leptospermum swamp scrubland—although this is not their preferred habitat, it is less heavily populated by mammalian predators. The total population was lower than 500 individuals at one point. A programme of translocation to predator-free islands (such as Ulva Island, Motuara Island, and Nukuwaiata Island) was instituted and proved relatively successful at establishing new populations (around 600 individuals on Motuara alone). In the South Island, P. australis has a strong affinity for Douglas fir plantations, instead of the native forests (kanuka trees) or Monterey pine plantations. This is apparently due to forest structure rather than strict food availability or viable nesting sites, as the species prefers structurally simple forests with dense, even canopies, and ground covered with leaf litter. When the population was introduced to Ulva Island, nesting was positively correlated with the presence of broad-leaved coastal vegetation.

== Behaviour and ecology ==
=== Breeding ===
South Island robins are genetically monogamous, and extra-pair paternity is rare. As they do typically remain monogamous, are non-migratory, and remain on their breeding territories year-round, a male and female in one territory will compete for food resources during non-breeding times. Competition is reduced somewhat by slightly different foraging methods; however, they will steal from their mate's cache if given the opportunity. Males do dominate females, and thus will aggressively exclude females from food, such that females will only access food sources when unattended by the males. During breeding season, the female is solely responsible for nest building and incubation, and the male will provide the female and the hatchlings with food.

South Island robins become sexually mature between six and 12 months of age. They begin their breeding season fairly early in August or September (Southern Hemisphere spring) and thus can make use of the winter's remaining food stores during this time. They build open-cup nests in tree-forks or inside tree cavities. Incubation lasts 18 days, and chicks leave the nest after 21 days. Five to 25 days after fledglings leave the nest, the pair may breed again. Modal clutch size is two eggs, with the expected inverse correlation between dimensions and number of eggs. Replacement clutches, in the case of loss of eggs or nestlings to predation, can be produced relatively rapidly, within 3–10 days.

=== Feeding ===
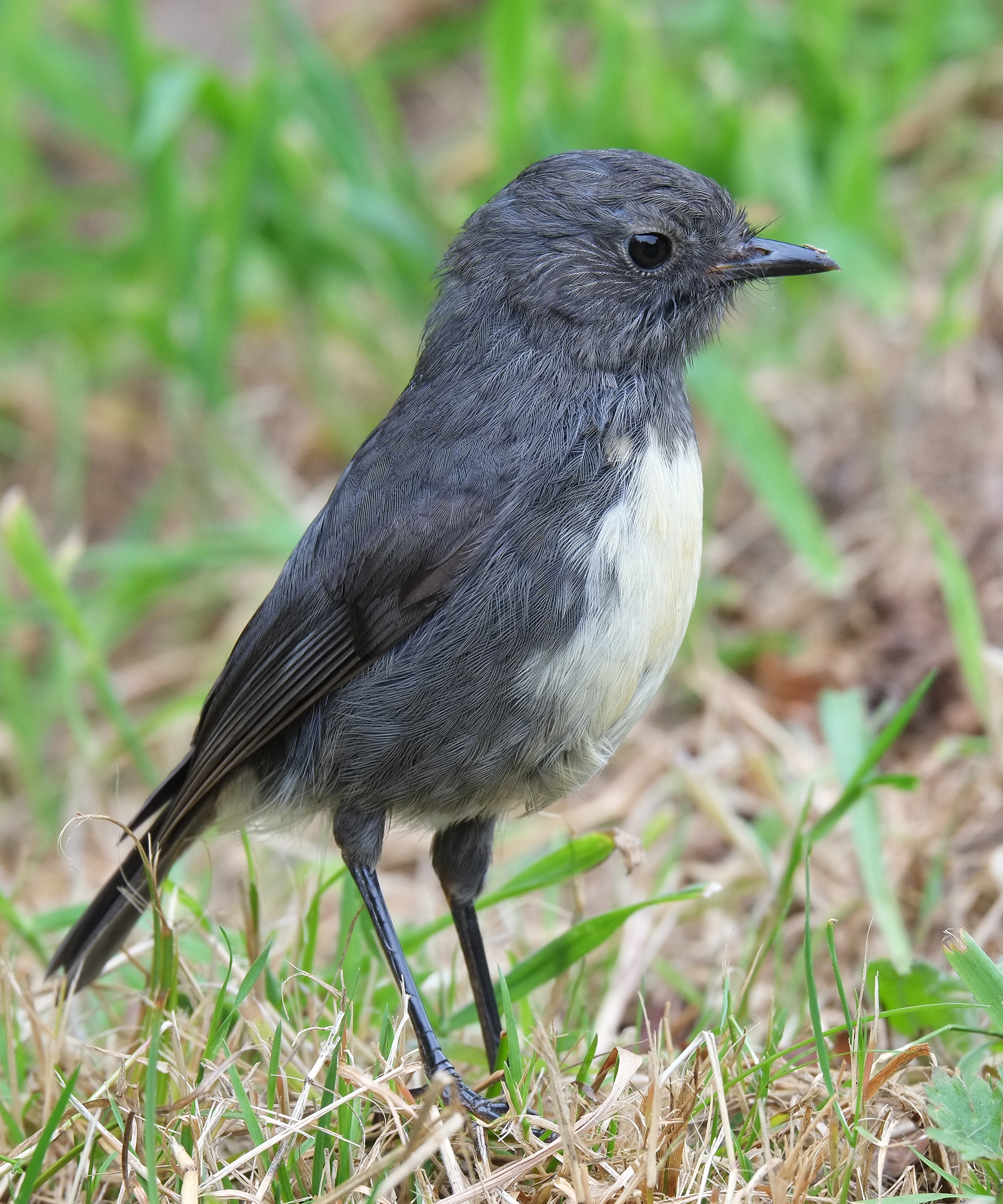
South Island robin foraging on the ground

Invertebrates, including earthworms, beetles, and other arthropods foraged from the leaf litter comprise most of the South Island robins' diet. Invertebrate prey may be cached whole or in portions. Single items are cached at separate sites. Prey is typically stored within 10 metres of where it was procured, even if the bird is outside its own territory. In the winter the primary cache is earthworms, while during the summer the trend is toward cicadas. South Island robins have a very good memory of their storage sites; a male was observed to empty as many as five consecutive caches before returning the stores to his mate during incubation. The birds have demonstrated an ability to differentiate and prioritise caches of varying sizes, up to 12 total items, without any training, which appears to be the highest recorded numerical competency of any wild animal. Because of its high metabolic rate, a robin might spend as much as 90% of its day foraging or storing during the winter. South Island robins have also been observed to eat berries on occasion; however, these are not cached.

=== Vocalisation ===
A male's call during non-breeding season is a series of loud notes with descending frequency, which start in rapid succession and finish slowly. During breeding season, the males resort to full song to court the females. Full song is a loud, clear, and continuous song, which can last for more than 30 minutes with very brief pauses, and is typically sung from the canopy or an emergent tree. Singing also appears to be performed as part of a strategic regulation of body mass. While robins sing during the dawn chorus as well as throughout the day, they seem to increase their singing according to food availability. When they have had more food, they will increase energetic behaviours, such as singing, to arrive at a strategic mass by dusk. Thus, even though two robins might begin the day with different weights, they will end the day with similar weights. A side-effect of this behaviour might be the showcasing of a particular male's ability to sequester resources: the longer he sings, the more capable he is of finding food, and thus a better candidate for a mate.

== Conservation ==
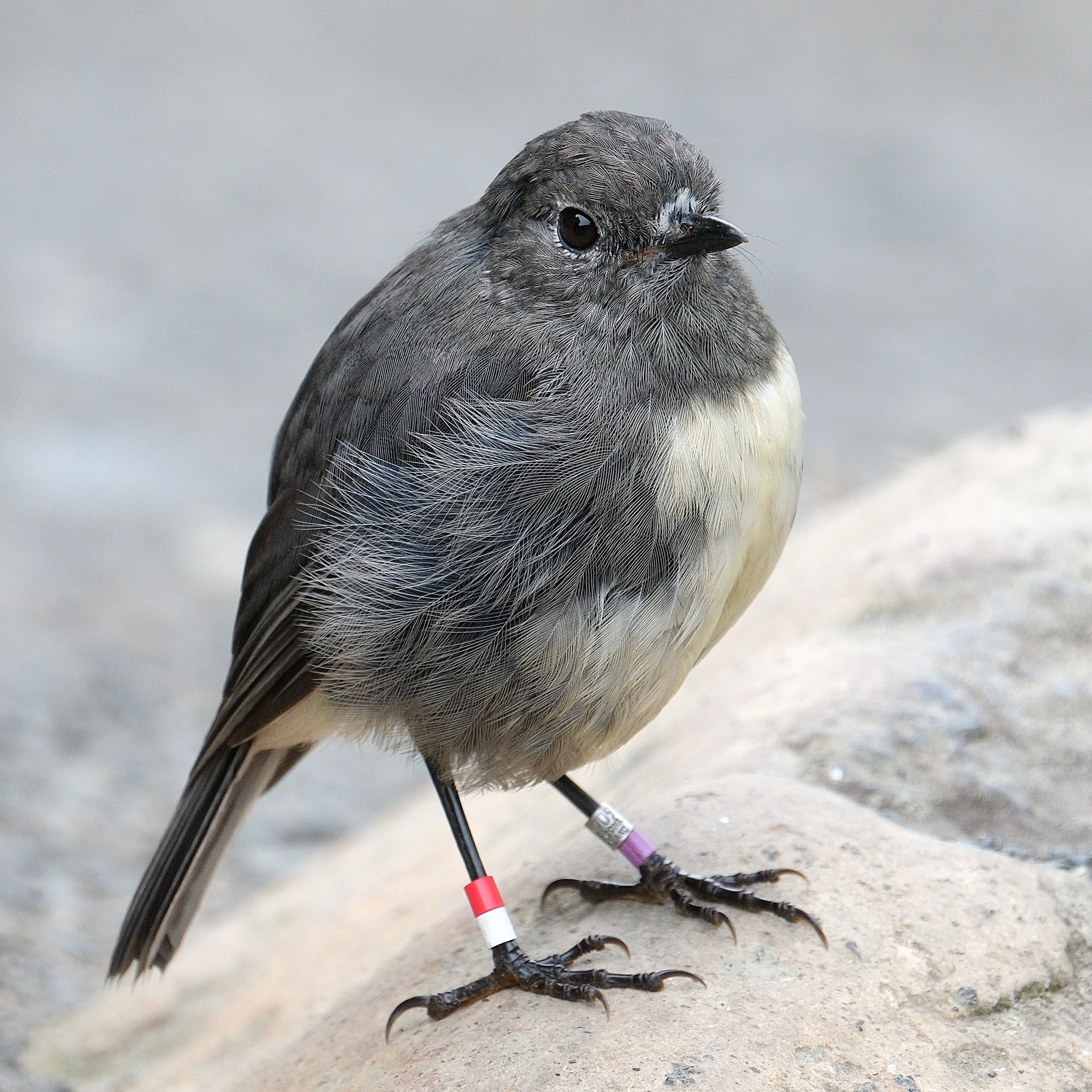
Banded South Island robin at Orokonui Ecosanctuary

The South Island robin is listed as being of least concern on the IUCN Red List. However, the Stewart Island robin (Petroica australis rakiura) has gone through a couple of bottlenecked populations recently because of deforestation and habitat loss, as well as introduced predators, such as rats, stoats, and feral cats. Because of this sharp decline in the Stewart Island population, several attempts have been made to translocate the Stewart Island robin to other islands nearby where introduced predators do not exist or have been eradicated (see above). However, many of these translocations have involved 12 or fewer colonising individuals, making inbreeding nearly unavoidable. This has led to some apparent immunocompetency issues as well as reproduction problems. On Motuara Island, high rates of hatching failure as well as fewer clutches were observed. Inbreeding and its genetic and immunological consequences, therefore, remain a concern with this subspecies.

In contrast, birds in the South Island do not show much genetic loss in comparison with historical populations, although their distribution on the island has become increasingly fragmented.

== South Island robins and 1080 poison ==
Robins have generally responded well to pest control programmes using aerial 1080 operations, with increased chick and adult survival, and increases in population size. A 2012 scientific study of a marked population by the University of Otago during a contemporary 1080 poison operation using cereal baits showed no negative impact on robins, and suggested a likely population increase by reducing predation pressure from introduced mammals. However, some robin deaths have been recorded as a result of accidental 1080 poisoning following pest control operations. Most of these were associated with four specific operations in the 1980s that used poor-quality carrot baits.
