= Rakeahua River =

Coordinates: 46°59′S 167°54′E

Location
- Country: New Zealand

The Rakeahua River is a river in Stewart Island / Rakiura, New Zealand, flowing into Paterson Inlet.

== See also ==
- List of rivers of New Zealand
