= Ryan's Creek Aerodrome =

Airport in New Zealand

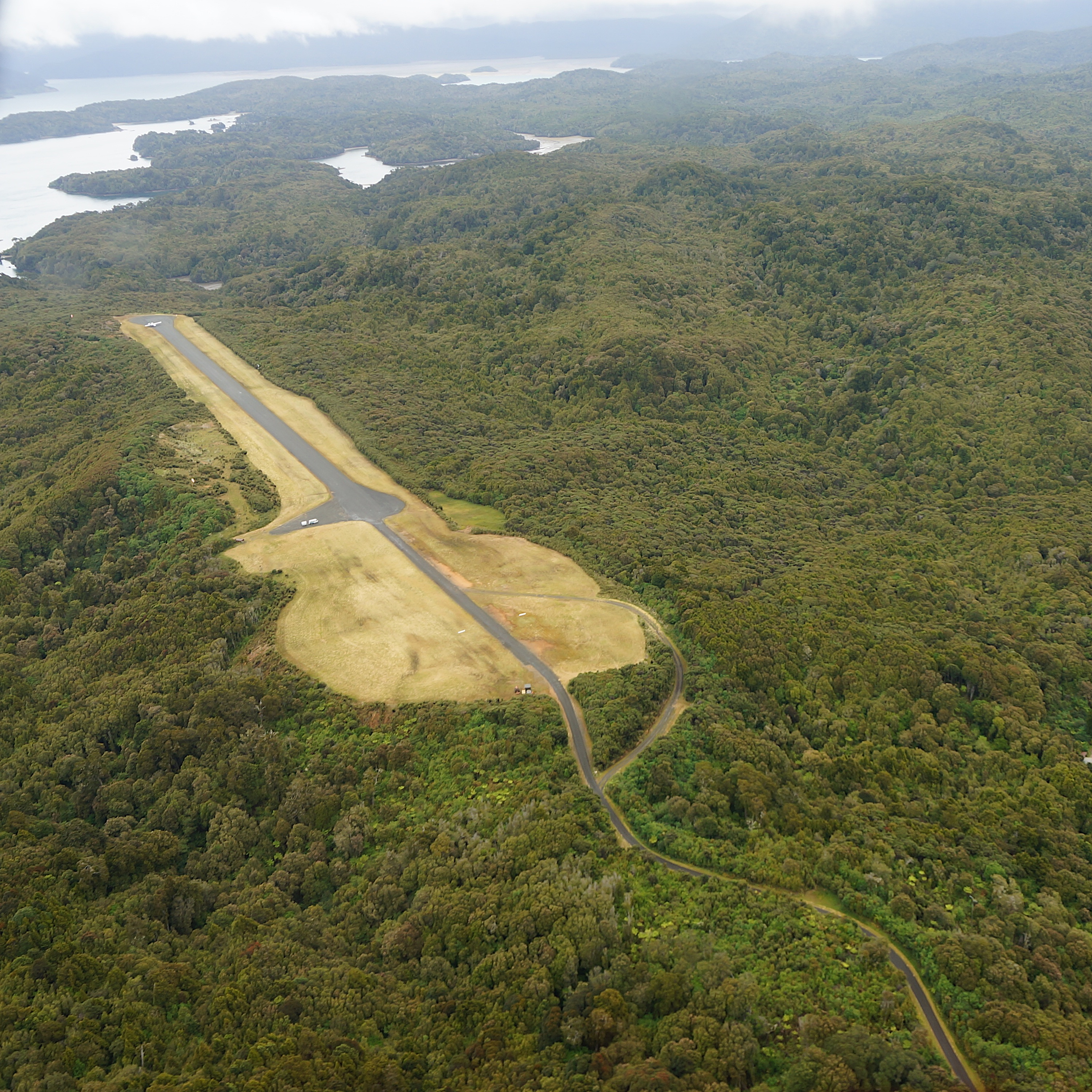
- IATA: SZS; ICAO: NZRC

Summary
- Airport type: Public
- Operator: South East Air
- Serves: Oban, New Zealand
- Location: Stewart Island, New Zealand
- Elevation AMSL: 288 ft (88 m)
- Coordinates: 46°53′59″S 168°06′06″E

Map
- Location of Ryan's Creek Aerodrome within New Zealand

Runways
Direction	Length		Surface
Direction	m	ft	Surface
04/22	800	2,625
- Source: New Zealand AIP

Ryan's Creek Aerodrome (IATA: SZS, ICAO: NZRC) is a small airstrip on Stewart Island in southern New Zealand.

== History ==
The aerodrome was built in the late 1970s and opened on 10 March 1979 to accommodate operations by Stewart Island Air Services. In the mid-1980s the runway and taxiways were asphalted. In 1990 a hill at one end of the strip was leveled; this left more room for aircraft to land and allowed easier access to the airstrip. A celebration of 25 years since the establishment of the airstrip was held in March 2004.

The aerodrome is used by Stewart Island Flights for scheduled services to Invercargill Airport.

== Facilities ==
The airport is at an elevation of 288 feet (88 m) above mean sea level. It has one runway, designated "04/22", which measures 800 by 66 metres (2,625 ft × 217 ft).

== Airlines and destinations ==
Ryan's Creek Aerodrome is connected to Queenstown Airport by Glenorchy Air, and to Invercargill Airport by Stewart Island Flights.

== See also ==
- List of airports in New Zealand
- List of airlines of New Zealand
- Transport in New Zealand
