= Stewart Island Flights =

New Zealand airline

| IATA | ICAO | Call sign |
|---|---|---|
| WK | RKU | RAKIURA |
- Founded: 2000; 26 years ago
- Fleet size: 4
- Destinations: 2
- Parent company: South East Air Ltd
- Headquarters: Invercargill, New Zealand
- Key people: Bill Moffatt (Director); Leon Bax (Director)
- Website: stewartislandflights.co.nz

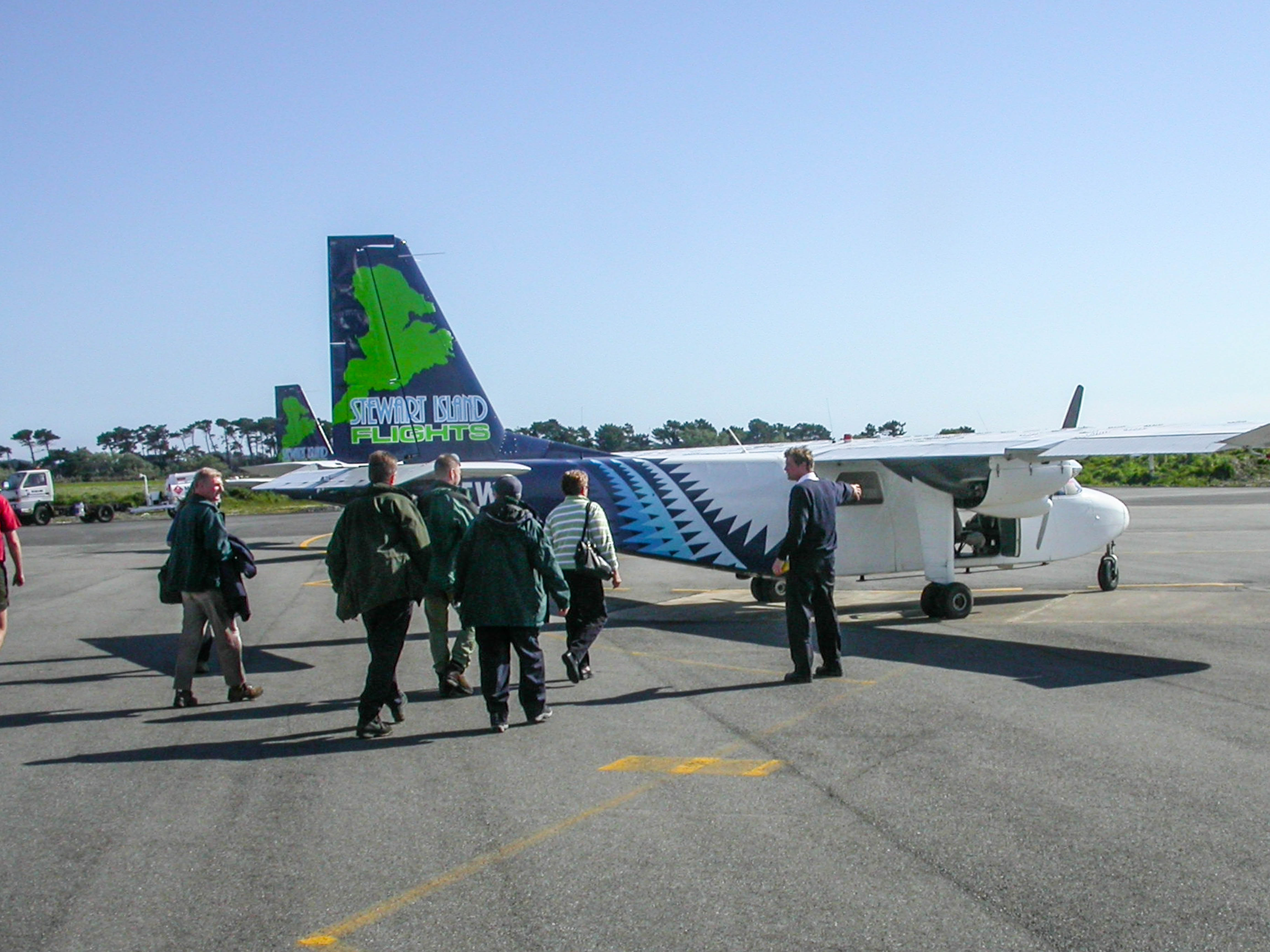
Flight to Stewart Island, Invercargill Airport

Stewart Island Flights is a commuter airline from New Zealand that conducts scheduled flights on light aircraft between Invercargill and Stewart Island. The airline also operates charter services to several of the island's beaches. In 2000, Southern Air was acquired by South East Air Ltd, which was founded by Raymond Hector and Bill Moffatt in 1993. Since then, South East Air Ltd has been the parent company and holder of the Air Operator Certificate (AOC) under which Stewart Island Flights and Invercargill Aircraft Maintenance operate.

Hector retired from the roles of chief executive and chief pilot of Stewart Island Flights in 2021 after co-owning the business and its parent company for a total of 28 years. Leon Bax was appointed as replacement company director.

== Services ==
The airline operates three flights a day between Invercargill Airport and Ryan's Creek Aerodrome on Stewart Island, with regular additional departures during the summer season (October to the end of April). SIF also arranges scenic flights around Stewart Island and the Southland Region.

The company also flies from Mason Bay on the western side of Stewart Island, to Duck Creek, Martin's Creek, Cavalier, and Kilbride. and beach landing sites at Doughboy Bay, Little Hellfire Beach, West Ruggedy Beach, Sealers Bay (Codfish Island), and Smoky Beach.

Until 2011, the parent company South East Air operated an IFR post run using a Piper PA-32 between Invercargill and Dunedin. As such, South East Air was one of only two companies in New Zealand that had the capability to fly a single-engine piston aircraft at night under IFR.

== Fleet ==
As of January 2024, the Stewart Island Flights fleet consists of the following aircraft:

Stewart Island Flights fleet
| Aircraft | Total | Orders | Passengers |
|---|---|---|---|
| Britten-Norman BN-2A-26 Islander | 2 | | 9 |
| Piper PA-32-300 Cherokee Six | 1 | | 5 |
| Cessna 185E Skywagon | 1 | | 5 |
| Total | 4 | | |

In September 2026, Stewart Island Flights announced their intentions to refurbish and return a fifth aircraft into service after receiving a $670,000 loan from the Regional Infrastructure Fund.

== Incidents ==
In 2011, a Piper Cherokee aircraft operated by Stewart Island Flights crashed in shallow water shortly after taking off from Doughboy Bay beach. The pilot and the sole passenger on board both swam to safety. The cause of the incident was attributed to a wind downdraft.

== Recognition ==
In 2007, the airline won the Corporate Conservation Award at the Department of Conservation awards evening, in recognition of the support provided for Stewart Island Community and Environment Trust and conservation management at Stewart Island.

In 2023, the airline was named as New Zealand's "most loved" airline, following a survey carried out by Australian-based foreign exchange company S-Money.
