= Invercargill Airport =

Airport in the South Island of New Zealand

- IATA: IVC; ICAO: NZNV

Summary
- Airport type: Public
- Operator: Invercargill Airport Ltd
- Location: Invercargill
- Elevation AMSL: 5 ft (1.5 m)
- Coordinates: 46°24′44″S 168°18′46″E
- Website: www.invercargillairport.co.nz

Map
- Location of Invercargill Airport in New Zealand

Runways
Direction	Length		Surface
Direction	m	ft	Surface
04/22	2,210	7,251	Asphalt
04R/22L	695	2,280	Grass
07/25	426	1,398	Grass
12/30	913	2,996	Grass

Statistics (2013)
- Passengers: 270,924

Invercargill Airport (IATA: IVC, ICAO: NZNV) is a fully secured controlled domestic designated airport located 1.6 km (one mile) west of the central business district of Invercargill at the bottom of the South Island of New Zealand. It is the southernmost controlled airport in New Zealand and the Commonwealth of Nations. Formed on land reclaimed from the Waihopai/New River Estuary in 1938, the airport was prone to flooding, notably in 1984 when it was inoperable for two months. The Invercargill City Council considered moving the airport back to Dawson Farm, Myross Bush, the original site up to 1942. Instead, a large flood protection scheme was built, but during its construction heavy rain and an unusually high tidal surge flooded it again in 1987. There have been no problems since. The airport has a main secured terminal, a backup international secured terminal and 5 tarmac gates. Invercargill is the eleventh-busiest airport in New Zealand by passenger traffic.

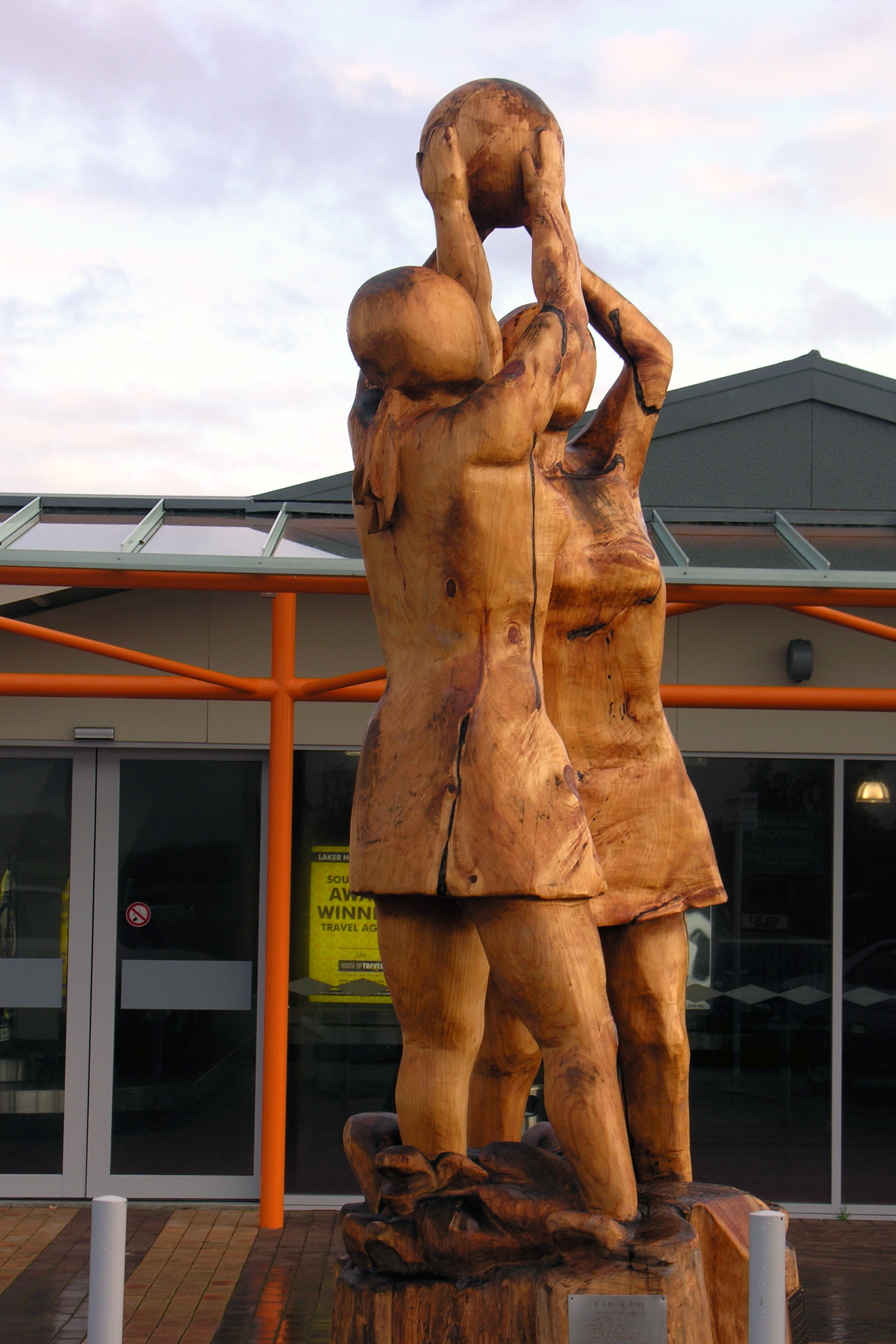
Netball sculpture, Invercargill Airport, Southland, New Zealand, 22 July 2005

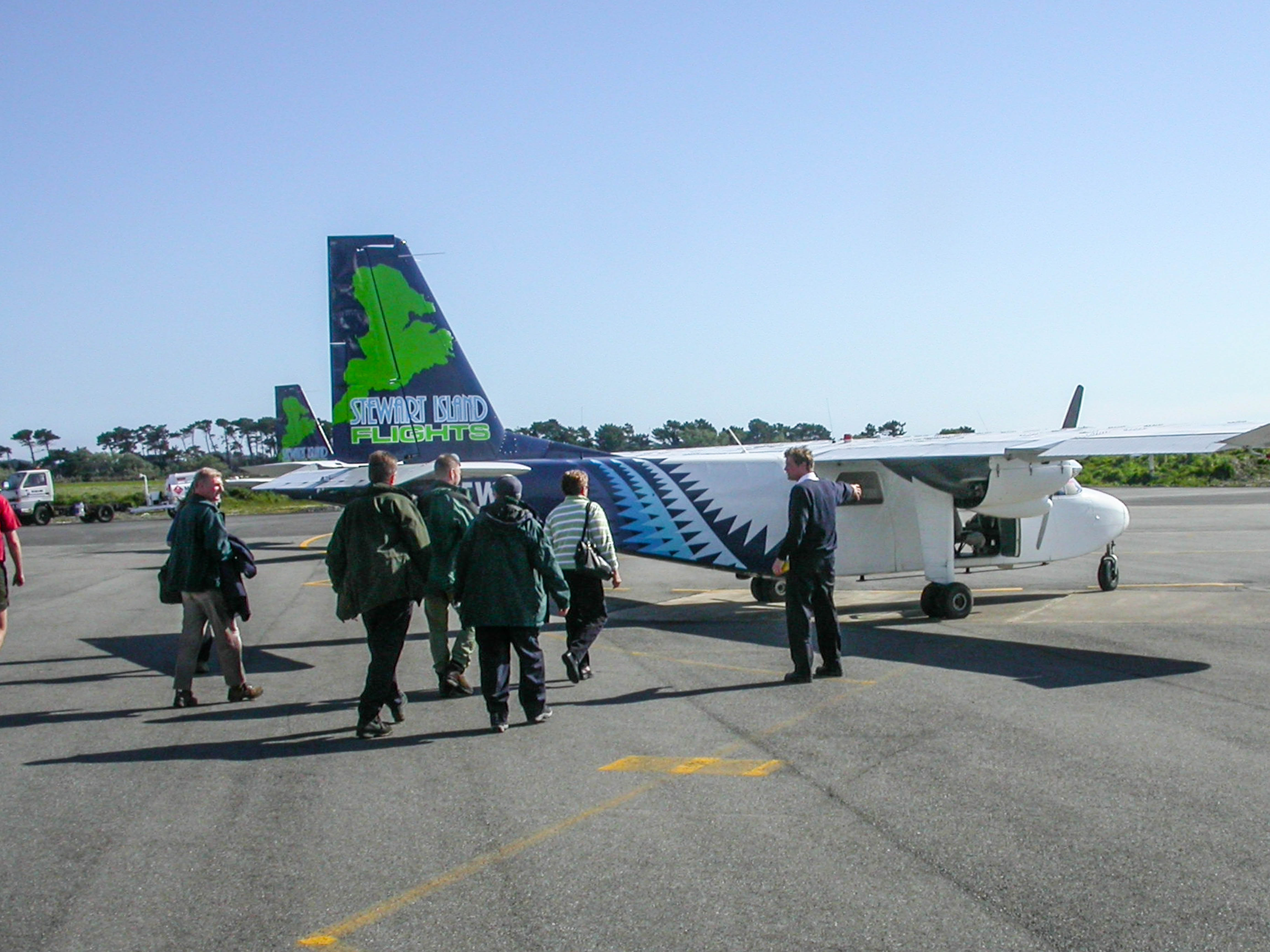
Flight to Stewart Island, Invercargill Airport

== History ==
Today's airport is located on what was a tidal estuary lake. The site was chosen as it is closer to the city than the original aerodrome, Dawson Farm, located a then considerable 10 km away northeast of Invercargill. The draining and stabilising of land began in 1936. The continual draining of the surrounding land was (and still is) achieved with the use of a large canal and tidal pumping system. It took until 1939 before a rudimentary landing strip was considered acceptable for light aircraft to land. By then World War Two had begun and the RNZAF used it as an auxiliary field while Dawson Farm remained the air force's aerodrome of choice as heavier patrol bombers could land there. The city council built two hangars and the air force a larger facility. Pre-fabricated office blocks provided basic administration facilities.

The airport's first scheduled service was on 7 November 1944 by Union Airways' Lockheed 10 Electra flying from Dunedin. The terminal facilities were little more than two small sheds at the time; and a Union Airways limousine bus service provided passengers a direct link to the downtown terminal located on The Crescent.

When the Government nationalized all airlines to create NAC in 1947, the Electra service was replaced by de Havilland DH.89s. Once the new paved runway was created in 1956 along with a new substantial but temporary terminal, Douglas DC-3s began operating. Meanwhile, a local airline, Amphibian Airways, had started the Stewart Island route in the early 1950s, using Grumman Widgeons. The amphibians also serviced isolated coastal lighthouses and their settlements. Stewart Island Air Services took over in the late 1970s, and was then taken over by Southern Air in 1981, which still provides the air service to Stewart Island as Stewart Island Flights.

== Growth ==
The runway was lengthened periodically over the years to cater for larger aircraft in time, such as NAC Fokker F27s (1961), NAC Vickers Viscount (1969), culminating with NAC's Boeing 737-200 type in 1975. Other aircraft such as RNZAF Boeing 727-100 and Ansett New Zealand BAe 146 s have used the runway with ease. Currently the runway length is 2210 metres.

=== Terminal facilities ===
The passenger terminal facilities originally developed around a striking "Festival of Britain" styled two-level structure built in 1963, which featured a distinctive lozenge-shaped roof and fully glazed airside walls giving great views of the runway from the upper deck. A ground-level outdoor viewing gallery allowed passengers and well wishers to mingle; this area was in 2002, closed to all but passengers. It was built against the original small 1956-built "temporary" terminal which was turned into the freight and baggage area. The small control tower in the original structure became a convenient skylight upon the completion of a standard NZCAA five-storey "flowerpot" control tower in 1962. A jetway was added by Air New Zealand in 1988 to ease passenger comfort during inclement weather. Airlines also provided premium club passenger lounges for their member patrons. As frequency of air services increased, the ground floor space became cramped while the upstairs space was usually empty. After Air New Zealand removed its jetway in 2012, it was decided to look at refurbishing the ground floor and extending it, or replace the structure which had to be brought up to new Earthquake safety codes.

New Terminal Building, 2016

In 2013 the airport announced a new terminal building was to be constructed at a cost of $13.3 million, with construction funded by Invercargill City Holdings Ltd (Holdco); the then current terminal was over 50 years old and had major seismic issues that needed to be brought up to new safety codes. It was deemed more economical to demolish and rebuild a new terminal. Construction of the new single-storey structure began in 2014 and gradually built over the site of the old terminal in three stages over approximately 20 months. Opened in 2016, it has an area of 2,900 m^{2}, only slightly bigger than the existing terminal of 2,600 m^{2} but makes better use of the floor area. Air New Zealand installed a new premium passenger lounge for its frequent flyers. Fitted out in local materials to enhance the region's tourist attractions, the terminal is designed for further expansion. In 2019 a new secured passenger and baggage handling facilities were added for domestic (and occasional international) air services.

=== Small is more ===
Regular jet services operated into the airport from 1975 until 1995, when Air New Zealand restructured all its secondary provincial routes after subsidiary Mount Cook Airline introduced the 68-seat ATR 72 -200 into service. Though a turboprop aircraft similar in size to the Viscount, it allowed a higher frequency of departure choices up to eight every weekday including late evenings. The larger-capacity 737s were restricted to three departures a day (including a short morning flight to Dunedin and onto Wellington) with the last flight out at 1630hrs. Air New Zealand resisted local pressure not to remove the jets, convincing Southlanders that the smaller ATR (and later, Q300 ) aircraft would allow for a higher frequency of service with minimal time difference. When fellow subsidiary Air Nelson joined the Invercargill route with the 50-seat Q300 (an aircraft the size of a Fokker F27 -500), this allowed a new non-stop route to Wellington, giving Southlanders direct access to the nation's capital city. This service ended in January 2025 due to uneconomic passenger numbers.

=== Return of jet services ===
In December 2018 Air New Zealand announced it would introduce a direct service from and to Auckland, using the Airbus A320 . This service commenced from 25 August 2019 with the arrival of the first Airbus A320 from Auckland, departing Invercargill the next day at 0600. Scheduled morning departures 0600 Monday, Tuesday, Thursday, Friday, and 0930 Saturday, and returning at 2130 on Monday, Wednesday, Thursday, Friday and Sunday. During the Covid Global Pandemic of 2019–21, flights to and from Auckland changed to a midday return service and have remained so since. Air New Zealand said the Auckland service proved there was a demand for non-stop flights to Auckland, and it had worked with locals to achieve this. It is the longest domestic flight in New Zealand, covering 730 miles (1,170km) with the flight time of approximately 1 hour and 40 minutes.

=== Made "Secured" ===
With the return of domestic jet services in 2019, the airport had to comply with international regulations. This has involved completely fencing in the airport perimeter, upgrading the rescue truck fleet, installing a screening area for departing passengers using jet services as well as x-ray machines for baggage. It also means the airport now has 24-hour security patrols. Being declared Secured also allowed the removal of restrictions to the occasional international flights that have to use the airport.

== Today ==
In 2005, the runway was extended to 2,210 m at a cost of NZ$5 million, as of 2012 it is the third-longest civilian runway in New Zealand, capable of handling aircraft of Boeing 737/Airbus A320, and weight restricted Boeing 777-200/787-9 type sized aircraft. The airport has adopted a masterplan to cater for diversions. The terminal apron and gates can permanently sustain aircraft to the size of Airbus A321. Baggage container handling equipment and airstairs were installed in 2016 after the new single level passenger terminal was opened.

Regular types using the airport now are the Airbus A320 and ATR 72.

The apron parking gates were refurbished in 2019 with repositioned Gates 1 and 2 given concrete hardstands allowing aircraft up to the heavier Airbus A321 to park nose in to the terminal. Air New Zealand aircraft are pushed back with push-back tractors. Gates 3, 4 and 5 are still turn in, turn out marked. Runway resurfacing with a fresh top of asphalt over its older sections in 2011 has helped to increase weight limits for aircraft usage.

=== Commercial operators ===
Air New Zealand is the major carrier operating from the airport, operating the ATR-72 type for flights to and from Christchurch, Airbus A320 to and from Auckland. Air New Zealand previously operated flights to Wellington, although these were terminated in January 2025 due to high operating costs and softening demand. Air New Zealand has a small maintenance base for servicing as up to three aircraft are stabled overnight. Stewart Island Flights operate inter-island services to Oban, the main settlement on Stewart Island up to three times per day. Also on demand for pre-booked groups. Mainland Air operate flights to and from Dunedin on behalf of the Southern District Health Board. This service is used to transfer medical staff on a daily basis and have seats when available for purchase by the general public via their web site.

=== International technical stopover ===
Invercargill is, since August 2019, designated a Fully Secured international airport. Before then it was classed as unsecured and required special clearances to operate occasional flights.

Invercargill Airport has had aspirations from the 1980s through to the 2000s as an international destination with proposals that have failed to get off the ground with nearby Queenstown being developed as a more direct route for jet aircraft. Nonetheless, Invercargill is now used as a fill-up point for international services as well as designated weather diversion airport for flights to and from Queenstown thanks to its longer runway. A rudimentary standby international terminal facility was located in Hangar 2 until the structure was demolished in 2023. Passengers now use the secured facilities in the main terminal.

Since July 2012, Air New Zealand had used Invercargill as a technical stop when conditions in Queenstown restrict aircraft from taking off with sufficient fuel to fly directly to Australia due to inclement weather or operational reasons (e.g. high payload). In the past such flights have been routed through Christchurch, adding two hours to the journey, but by comparison going via Invercargill saves one hour. Passengers usually do not leave the aircraft when refueling is taking place.

Invercargill now has appropriate fully secured border control measures to service international flights for Chartered services or diverted flights if Queenstown airport closes due to adverse weather conditions. The airport's security services as well as Customs Officers from the nearby Port of Bluff provide official immigration clearance services.

On 3 March 2013, Invercargill handled over 400 passengers on international flights that were diverted from Queenstown due to low cloud while on 17 June 2024, Virgin Australia Flight 148, a Boeing 737-800 service from Queenstown to Melbourne, was diverted to Invercargill after one of the engines stalled from a bird strike while taking off from the former airport.

=== Minor military and Antarctic operations role ===
Although only ever a backup airport during the Second World War, military operations have remained rare due to Christchurch being chosen as the main Operation Deep Freeze Base in 1949 and what was then Dunedin's Taieri Aerodrome acting as a departure point for shorter range aircraft heading south. The occasional Antarctic flight did land at Invercargill if Taieri was closed. JATO power was needed to assist heavily laden aircraft off the ground. After the runway was lengthened and paved, larger aircraft such as the C-124 Globemaster, and C-121 Constellation used the airport for emergency and technical stopovers.

Today the airport is visited by aircraft of the United States ANG, Australian RAAF, Italy's Aeronautica Militare and RNZAF as part of Antarctic flight diversion training. The RNZAF has used the airfield area for their Wise Owl week-long exercises at least twice a decade.

The largest aircraft to regularly land at Invercargill is the Boeing C-17 Globemaster, although the runway has been "buzzed" by USAF KC-10 Extenders, Lockheed C-141 Starlifters and C-5 Galaxy for emergency diversion practise.

== Airlines and destinations ==
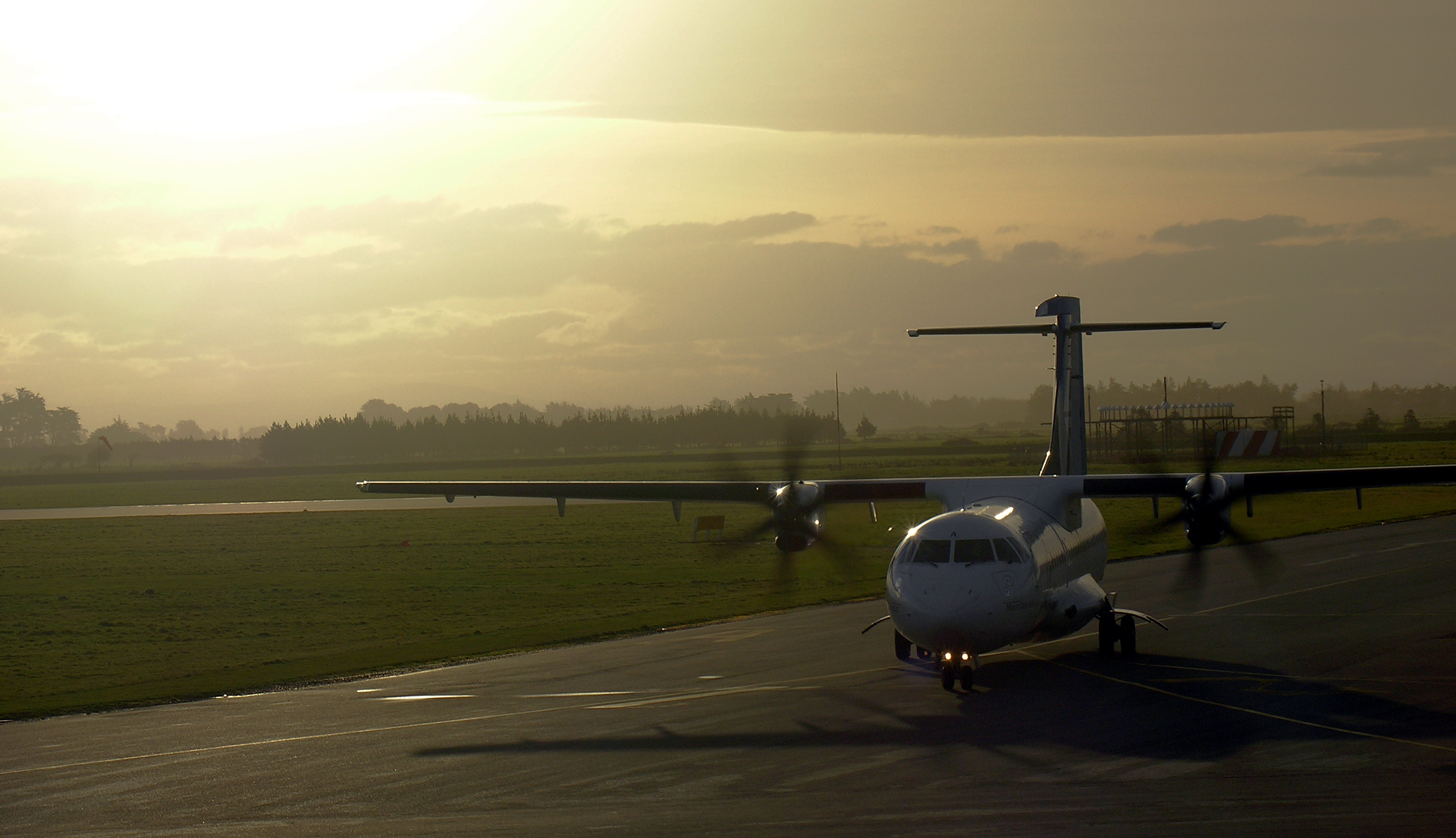
Late afternoon, Invercargill Airport

=== Passenger ===
Airlines	Destinations
Air New Zealand	Auckland, Christchurch
Stewart Island Flights	Oban

== See also ==
- List of airports in New Zealand
- List of airlines of New Zealand
- Transport in New Zealand
- List of busiest airports in New Zealand
