= Stewart Island =

New Zealand's third largest island

Rakiura (Māori)

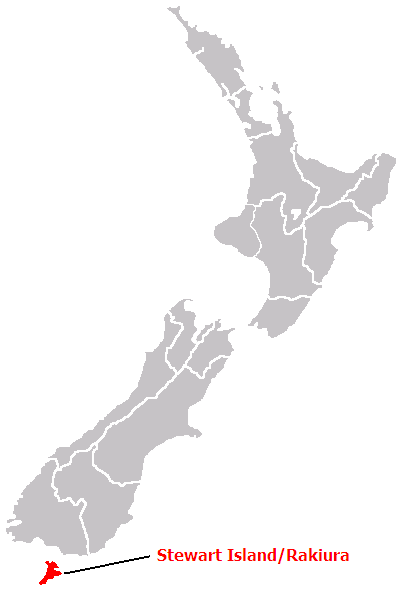

Geography
- Location: Foveaux Strait
- Coordinates: 47°00′S 167°50′E
- Archipelago: New Zealand archipelago
- Area: 1,747.72 km^{2} (674.80 sq mi)
- Highest elevation: 980 m (3220 ft)
- Highest point: Mount Anglem / Hananui

Administration
- New Zealand
- Electorates: Invercargill (general); Te Tai Tonga (Māori)
- MPs: Penny Simmonds (New Zealand National Party); Mananui Ramsden (New Zealand Labour Party)
- Local Government
- Regional Council: Environment Southland
- Largest settlement: Oban
- Territorial authority: Southland District
- Community Board: Stewart Island/Rakiura Community Board

Demographics
- Population: 500 (June 2025)
- Pop. density: 0.29/km^{2} (0.75/sq mi)

Stewart Island (Māori: Rakiura, lit. 'glowing skies', officially Stewart Island / Rakiura, formerly New Leinster) is the third-largest and southernmost inhabited island of New Zealand, lying 30 kilometres (16 nautical miles) south of the South Island, separated by Foveaux Strait.

It is a roughly triangular island with a land area of 1,746 km^{2} (674 sq mi) . Its 164-kilometre (102 mi) coastline is indented by Paterson Inlet (east), Port Pegasus (south), and Mason Bay (west). The island is generally hilly (rising to 980 metres or 3,220 feet at Mount Anglem) and densely forested. Almost all the island is owned by the New Zealand government, and over 80 percent of the island forms Rakiura National Park.

Stewart Island's economy depends on fishing and summer tourism. Its permanent population was recorded at 486 people in the 2023 census. Most residents live in the settlement of Oban on the eastern side of the island. Ferries connect Oban to Bluff in the South Island. Stewart Island is part of the Southland District for local government purposes.

== History and naming ==
Paterson Inlet

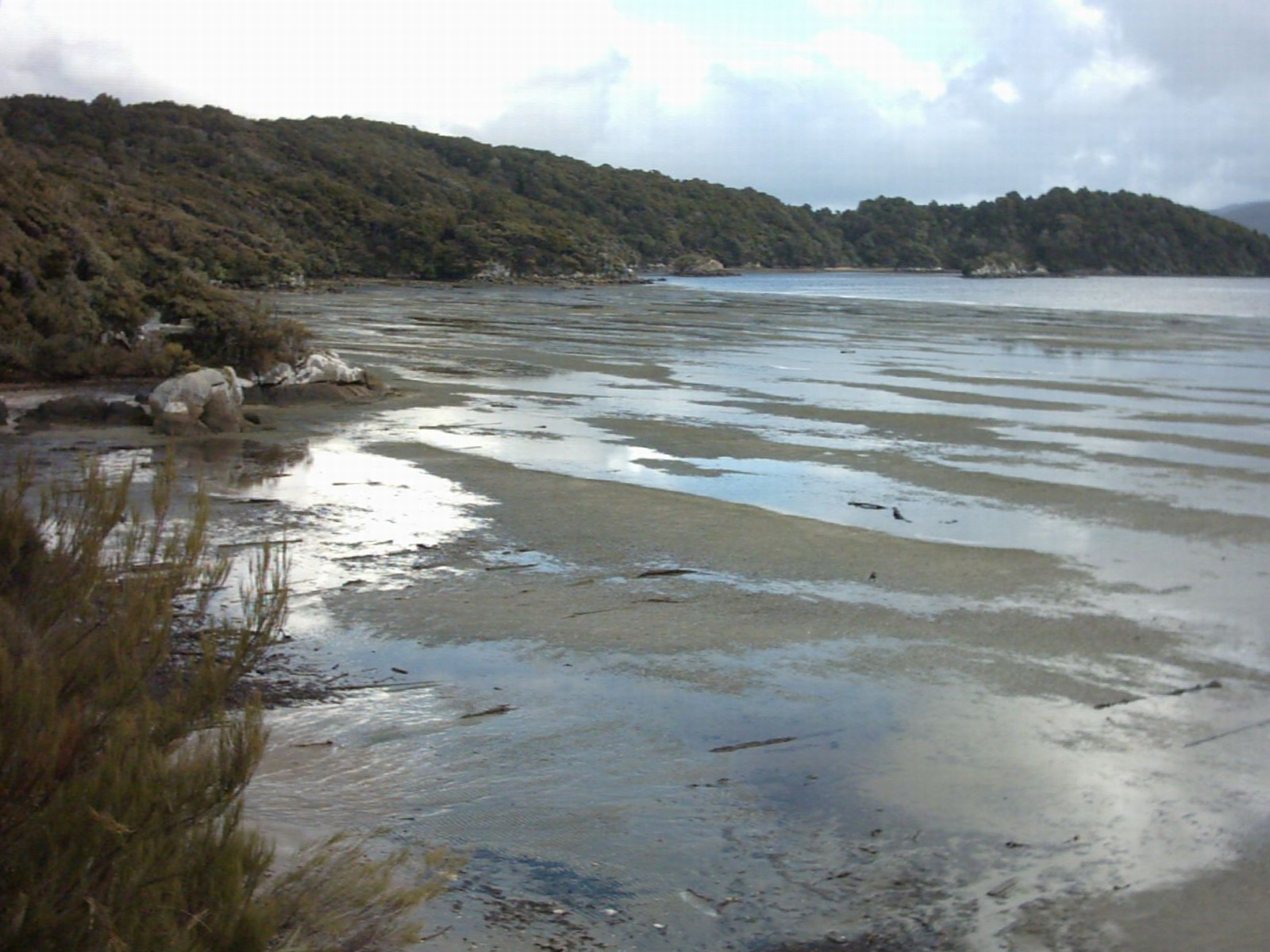
Mudflats near Oban

Archaeology indicates that the island was settled in the 14th century, shortly after the Māori settled in the South Island.

The original Māori name, Te Punga o Te Waka a Māui, means "The Anchor Stone of Māui’s Canoe". This refers to the legend of Māui and his crew, who from their canoe Te Waka a Māui (the South Island), caught and raised the great fish Te Ika a Māui, the North Island.

The more common Māori name, Rakiura, is usually translated as "glowing skies" in reference to the aurora australis.

For some, Rakiura is the abbreviated version of Te Rakiura a Te Rakitamau, translated as "great blush of Rakitamau", in reference to the latter's embarrassment when refused the hand in marriage of not one but two daughters of an island chief.

James Cook saw the insularity of Stewart Island during his first Pacific Voyage in 1770. After five days of sailing south/clockwise around the island, Endeavour was at the western entrance of Foveaux Strait where the crew could see Ruapuke Island, which they had passed 5 days earlier, at the eastern entrance of the strait. Cook wrote: “they're appear’d an open Channel … we saw the small island we were in with on the 6th instant”. Zachary Hicks wrote: “this is ye Western opening of the Passage mentioned the 6 Ins.” Nonetheless, Cook knew that an offshore island was strategically valuable to Britain’s rivals and should be hidden as a matter of military policy. He tried to erase his description of Foveaux Strait from his journal and drew a revised chart attaching the island to the mainland, turning Stewart Island into a peninsula.

Like Beaglehole, another New Zealand historian, Robert McNab, was shocked by this. Neither could conceive that Cook and the Admiralty would engage in strategic disinformation/cartographic secrecy. McNab writes: “Unless given us in Cook’s own words, it would be incredible that he could have made such a mistake.". However, G. A. Mawer argues that Cook was simply unsure whether it was an island because his focus was on finding the southern extent of New Zealand, and conditions were unfavourable for more closely exploring a possible strait.

The strait was first charted by Owen Folger Smith, a New Yorker who had been in Sydney Harbour with Eber Bunker, from whom he probably learned of the eastern seal hunting. Smith charted the strait in the whaleboat of the sealing brig Union (out of New York) in 1804 and on his 1806 chart, it was called Smith's Straits.

The island received its English name in honour of William W. Stewart. He was first officer on the Pegasus, which visited in 1809, and he charted the large south-eastern harbour that now bears the ship's name (Port Pegasus) and determined the northern points of the island, proving that it was an island. In 1824, he initiated plans in England to establish a timber, flax and trading settlement at Stewart Island and sailed there in 1826.

In 1841, the island was established as one of the three Provinces of New Zealand and was named New Leinster. However, the province existed on paper only and was abolished after only five years. With the passing of the New Zealand Constitution Act 1846, the island became part of New Munster, which entirely included the South Island. When New Munster was abolished in 1853, Stewart Island became part of Otago Province until 1861, when Southland Province split from Otago. In 1876, the provinces were abolished altogether.

For most of the twentieth century, "Stewart Island" was the official name, and the most commonly used. The name was officially altered to Stewart Island/Rakiura by the Ngāi Tahu Claims Settlement Act 1998, one of many such changes under the Ngāi Tahu treaty settlement.

== Geography ==
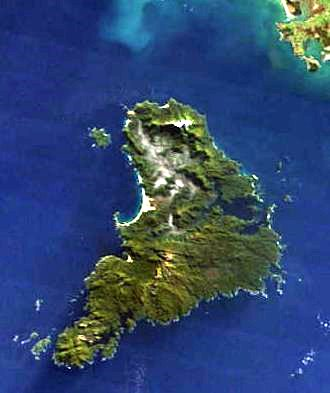
Satellite image of Stewart Island

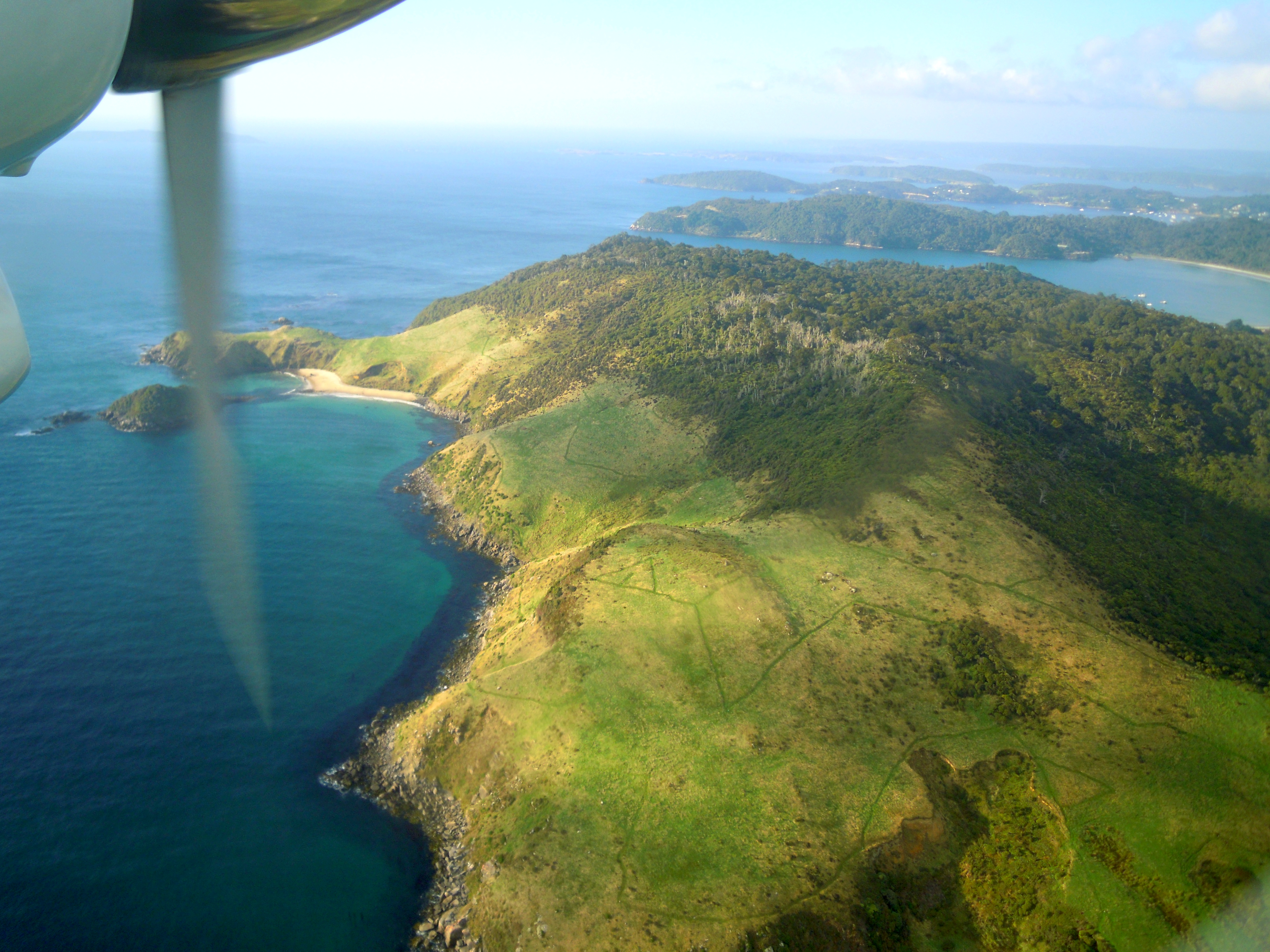
Northern part of Stewart Island, with a view over some of the bays

Stewart Island has an area of 1,680 square kilometres (650 sq mi). The highest point is Mount Anglem, at 980 metres (3,215 ft) above sea level, located close to the island's north coast. Following the passage of the Ngāi Tahu Claims Settlement Act 1998, the official name of the peak was altered to Mount Anglem / Hananui.

The southern half is more uniformly undulating, rising to a ridge that runs south from the valley of the Rakeahua River, which also flows into Paterson Inlet. The southernmost point in this ridge is Mount Allen, at 750 metres (2,460 ft). Notable twin rock formations in this region are granite domes known as Gog and Magog.

Mason Bay, on the west side, is notable for being long and sandy. One suggestion is that the bay was formed in the aftershock of a meteorite impact in the Tasman Sea; however, no evidence has been found to support such a claim.

Approximately 18,000 years ago during the Last Glacial Maximum when sea levels were 100 m (330 ft) lower than present day levels, Stewart Island and its surrounding islands were connected to the rest of New Zealand. Sea levels began to rise 7,000 years ago, eventually separating Stewart Island from the mainland.

There are several large and many small islands around the coast. Codfish Island / Whenua Hou is an island nature reserve of 1,396 ha (3,450 acres) located 3 km (1.9 mi) west of Stewart Island, known as a protected habitat for kākāpō. Ulva Island is within Paterson Inlet, and is a 267 ha (660 acres) sanctuary for native species. It is open to the public and is maintained free of introduced pest animals.

Three groups of small islands around the north-east and south-west coasts of Stewart Island are known collectively as the Tītī / Muttonbird Islands. These are the locations for the traditional seasonal harvesting (muttonbirding) of sooty shearwater chicks by Rakiura Māori. The largest of these islands is Taukihepa / Big South Cape Island.

=== Settlements ===
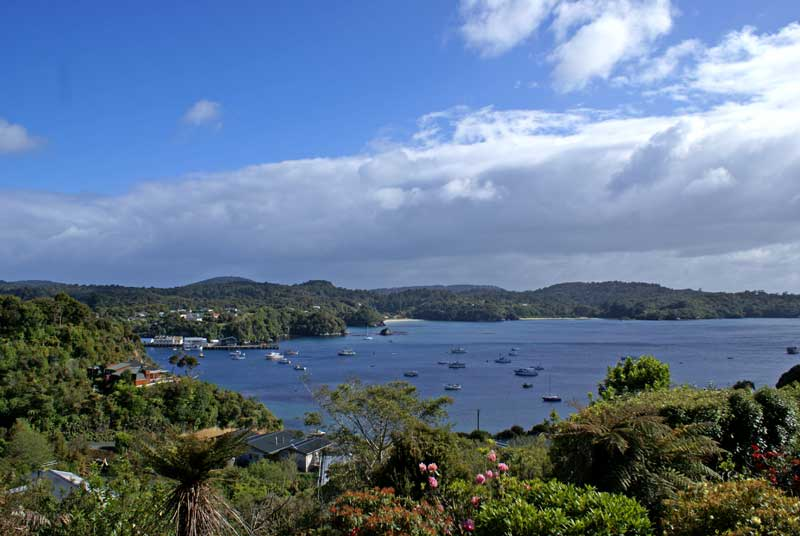
Overlooking Oban and Halfmoon Bay

The only town is Oban, on Halfmoon Bay.

=== Geology ===
Geologically, Stewart Island is made up of rocks from the Median Batholith. The island is mostly composed of granite, particularly the southern two thirds of the island. The northern third (north of the Freshwater Valley Fault) is composed of Anglem Complex diorites, minor gabbro and granite, and many pegmatites. The Freshwater Valley Fault in between is mainly alluvium and volcanic sediments.

=== Rivers ===
There is a variety of types of watercourse on Stewart Island as a result of the moderate to high rainfall and the wide variations in landform and soil types. They range from lowland rivers such as the Rakeahua and Freshwater rivers, to short and steep streams in the coastal northwest.

Freshwater River is the longest river on Stewart Island. It is navigable at high tide from Paterson Inlet and is used by water taxi services to transport walkers to Freshwater Landing, at the junction of the Southern Circuit and Northwest Circuit walking tracks. The tributaries are on the southern slopes of Mount Anglem and the eastern slopes of the Ruggedy Mountain area. In its lower reaches the river flows through a basin that comprises the majority of the flat land on Stewart Island. The Freshwater River valley contains the southernmost kahikatea forest in New Zealand.

== Rakiura National Park ==
Rakiura National Park is the 14th of New Zealand's national parks and was officially opened on 9 March 2002. The park covers close to 1,400 square kilometres (540 sq mi), which is about 85% of the area of Stewart Island / Rakiura. The area of the park excludes the township around Halfmoon Bay (Oban) and some roads as well as private or Māori-owned land further inland.

== Climate ==
Stewart Island has a temperate climate. However, one travel guide mentions "frequent downpours that make 'boots and waterproof clothing mandatory", and another guide says that rainfall in Oban, the principal settlement, is 1,600 to 1,800 mm (63 to 71 in) a year.

Climate data for Oban, Stewart Island (1991–2020 normals, extremes 1975–present)
Month	Jan	Feb	Mar	Apr	May	Jun	Jul	Aug	Sep	Oct	Nov	Dec	Year
Record high °C (°F)	30.6 (87.1)	28.5 (83.3)	26.5 (79.7)	29.0 (84.2)	20.5 (68.9)	17.5 (63.5)	16.0 (60.8)	17.1 (62.8)	21.3 (70.3)	25.0 (77.0)	26.5 (79.7)	28.5 (83.3)	30.6 (87.1)
Mean daily maximum °C (°F)	17.6 (63.7)	17.5 (63.5)	16.2 (61.2)	14.4 (57.9)	12.4 (54.3)	10.4 (50.7)	10.1 (50.2)	10.8 (51.4)	12.5 (54.5)	13.6 (56.5)	14.9 (58.8)	16.7 (62.1)	13.9 (57.1)
Daily mean °C (°F)	13.6 (56.5)	13.5 (56.3)	12.3 (54.1)	10.7 (51.3)	9.0 (48.2)	7.0 (44.6)	6.5 (43.7)	7.2 (45.0)	8.6 (47.5)	9.7 (49.5)	10.9 (51.6)	12.7 (54.9)	10.1 (50.3)
Mean daily minimum °C (°F)	9.6 (49.3)	9.5 (49.1)	8.4 (47.1)	7.0 (44.6)	5.7 (42.3)	3.6 (38.5)	2.8 (37.0)	3.7 (38.7)	4.8 (40.6)	5.7 (42.3)	7.0 (44.6)	8.7 (47.7)	6.4 (43.5)
Record low °C (°F)	1.0 (33.8)	0.9 (33.6)	0.7 (33.3)	−0.4 (31.3)	−6 (21)	−7.3 (18.9)	−6 (21)	−7 (19)	−4.5 (23.9)	−1.8 (28.8)	−0.4 (31.3)	0.6 (33.1)	−7.3 (18.9)
Average rainfall mm (inches)	138.4 (5.45)	106.9 (4.21)	139.3 (5.48)	118.7 (4.67)	155.3 (6.11)	139.6 (5.50)	130.8 (5.15)	116.0 (4.57)	122.8 (4.83)	146.5 (5.77)	134.4 (5.29)	116.3 (4.58)	1,565 (61.61)
Average rainy days (≥ 1.0 mm)	15.3	13.6	15.4	16.0	17.9	17.8	17.0	16.5	16.0	17.0	17.0	16.1	195.5
Average relative humidity (%)	84.3	87.4	87.4	89.4	91.1	90.9	91.3	89.9	85.0	84.3	81.6	82.6	85.8
Source: NIWA (rainy days and humidity 1975–2015)

== Demographics ==
Stewart Island covers 1,747.72 km^{2} (674.80 sq mi) including the offshore islands, the most sizeable being Ruapuke Island, Codfish Island / Whenua Hou and Taukihepa / Big South Cape Island. It had an estimated population of 500 as of June 2025, with a population density of 0.29 people per km^{2}.

Historical population
Year	Pop.	±% p.a.
2006	402	—
2013	378	−0.88%
2018	408	+1.54%
2023	486	+3.56%

Stewart Island had a population of 486 at the 2023 New Zealand census.

Of those at least 15 years old, 96 (19.8%) people had a bachelor's or higher degree, and 57 (11.7%) people had no formal qualifications. The median income was $38,400, compared with $31,800 nationally. 57 people (16.1%) earned over $70,000 compared to 17.2% nationally. The employment status of those at least 15 was that 231 (47.5%) people were employed full-time, 84 (17.3%) were part-time, and 9 (1.9%) were unemployed.

In the 2023 census ethnicities were recorded as being: 91.4% European, 21.6% Māori, 1.9% Pasifika, 1.2% Asian, and 1.2% other ethnicities.

== Ecology ==
=== Flora ===
Noeline Baker purchased land near Halfmoon Bay in the early 1930s and with a checklist by botanist Leonard Cockayne populated it with all the local indigenous plants. She gave the land and her house to the government in 1940, and today Moturau Moana is New Zealand's southernmost public garden.

=== Fauna ===
There are many species of birds on Stewart Island that have been able to continue to thrive because of the absence of the stoats, ferrets, and weasels that humans brought to the main islands. There are even more species of birds, including huge colonies of sooty shearwater and other seabirds, on The Snares and the other smaller islands offshore. The birds of Stewart Island include weka, kākā, albatross, the flightless Stewart Island kiwi, silvereyes, fantails, and kererū. The endangered yellow-eyed penguin has a significant number of breeding sites here. Other rare birds can be found in the many predator-free islands just offshore of Stewart Island, such as Whenua Hou, which is home to critically endangered kākāpō and other extremely rare bird species including mohua, kuaka, mātātā, and tūtukiwi. The South Island giant moa (Dinornis robustus) occurred on Stewart Island, subfossil remains having been retrieved in its dunes.

=== Threats and preservation ===
As the island has always been sparsely populated and there has never been very much logging, much of the original wildlife is intact, including species that have been devastated on the mainland post-colonisation. However, although habitats and wildlife were not threatened by invasive species historically, now there are populations of brushtail possums, feral cats, hedgehogs and three species of rats. Mice arrive on the island, but are not known to have established a population, and there are no mustelids. There is a large population of white-tailed deer, which were introduced to coastal areas and are hunted for meat and sport. There is also a small population of red deer, confined to the inland areas.

Rabbits were introduced to the island in 1943 which later became a pest after rapid multiplication.

In February 2025, the Department of Conservation (DOC) announced a pest eradication project on the island. The project, part of the Island-Ocean Connection Challenge (IOCC), targets three islands up to 15 times larger than any previously cleared of pests in New Zealand. The goal is to remove invasive species, restore ecosystems, and protect native wildlife, including kākāpō, seabirds, and rare plants. The total project cost is estimated at $202 million, with $54 million from the government and $11.5 million raised through philanthropy, leaving $137 million still needed.

== International Dark Sky Sanctuary ==
In January 2019, Stewart Island was accredited as a Dark Sky Sanctuary by the International Dark-Sky Association. This designation is given for sites in very remote locations to increase awareness of their dark sky characteristics and promote long-term conservation. The application for accreditation was made by Venture Southland, an agency responsible for the region's economic and community development initiatives and tourism promotion, with the aim of attracting more visitors, particularly in the winter period.

== Transport ==
=== Ferry services ===
The ferry journey across Foveaux Strait between Bluff Harbour on the South Island and Oban in Stewart Island is about 39 km (21 nmi) long. The present high speed catamaran service typically takes one hour. As of 2024, the ferry service is operated by the tourism company RealNZ (formerly Real Journeys).

==== History ====
The first scheduled service across Foveaux Strait began in 1877 for weekly mail delivery, but soon also carried passengers and general cargo. A larger vessel, the Bluff Harbour Board tug P.S. Awarua, took over the service in 1885. The Awarua arrived in Bluff on 4 January 1885, after a delivery voyage lasting more than 6 months since leaving dock in London. A trial excursion to Stewart Island on the Awarua took place on 10 March 1885, and a weekly service to Steward Island commenced. A government subsidy was required to support the service, but it brought economic benefit by supporting the development of the fishing industry based on Stewart Island and increased the number of visitors. Many different vessels were used by the Bluff Harbour Board on the Foveaux Strait ferry service in the first half of the 20th century, including the Southland and Theresa Ward, MV. Tamatea, and the steamer Orewa. Demands for a daily service across Foveaux were published in 1937. The twin screw steamer Wairua took over the Foveaux Strait ferry service in 1944. By 1959, the ferry service was operating with annual losses of £7,464. The steamer Wairua was 46 years old by that time, and a new replacement vessel was planned. In the interim, the government ship Matai replaced the Wairua.

By 1960, a new vessel to take over the Foveaux Strait service was under construction in Auckland. It was the largest ship to be constructed in New Zealand at that time, and was also named Wairua. The delivery voyage to Bluff was completed on 19 December 1961, and her first crossing of Foveaux Strait was on 20 December. The new Wairua was the first vessel in New Zealand to be fitted with anti-roll capabilities. The service to Stewart Island was twice a week during winter, and three times a week during summer. By 1985, the accumulated losses in operating the Wairua on the Foveaux Strait service over the previous 10 years totalled $6 million. The Minister of Transport, Richard Prebble, announced that the losses could not continue, and that the service would be withdrawn. Private operators would be invited to operate a service. The Wairua continued on the Stewart Island ferry service until September 1985, when she was sold for service in Fiji.

Private operators provided a replacement ferry service to Stewart Island after the government service ended in 1985. A new ferry for the Stewart Island service was built in Invercargill for the company Stewart Island Marine, and launched in April 1999. The new vessel was a catamaran capable of taking 100 passengers, one third more than the vessel it replaced. In 2004, after operating the business for 14 years, Stewart Island Marine sold the ferry service to Stewart Island Experience; a joint venture between two private individuals and the tourism company Real Journeys. A third vessel seating 160 passengers was added to the service in December 2004. However, within two weeks of beginning service, the vessel was sold to Fullers Northland for service in the Bay of Islands, after Fullers suffered the loss of a vessel. Real Journeys bought out their partners to take complete control of the Stewart Island ferry service in May 2005. In 2015, responding to proposals for subsidised travel to Stewart Island for senior citizens, the chief executive of Real Journeys stated: "Not only are Stewart Island ferries completely unsubsidised but the Foveaux Strait is an extremely expensive piece of water to operate on commercially".

=== Air services ===
Taking off from Mason Bay

Stewart Island Flights provides air services across Foveaux Strait between Invercargill Airport and Ryan's Creek Aerodrome on Stewart Island. Their aircraft also land on the sand at Mason Bay, Doughboy Bay, and West Ruggedy Beach.

==== History ====
In 1950, a licence was granted to Amphibian Airways to operate an air service between Invercargill and Stewart Island. In December 1950, finance was being sought for the purchase of a Grumman Widgeon amphibious aircraft. The inaugural flight to Half Moon Bay was made on 20 March 1951, with plans for a weekly service. In 1976, Stewart Island Air Services took over an amphibian air service to Stewart Island that had previously been operated by the Mount Cook Group. In 1980, Stewart Island Air Services rebranded as Southern Air. By 1980, a sealed airstrip had been built at Ryan's Creek above Oban, and services from Invercargill were provided using Nomad and Britten-Norman Islander aircraft.

In 1998 a Southern Air Cessna ditched into Foveaux Strait on a trip from Stewart Island to Invercargill after losing power to both engines, resulting in five deaths.

== Infrastructure ==
Spark, 2degrees, and One NZ all provide 3G mobile phone coverage. Spark also offers 4G 700 MHz coverage. Spark provides 4G Wireless Broadband, with One NZ providing 3G Rural Wireless Broadband. All these services are delivered via a radio link from Bluff.

Since 1988, the electricity supply on Stewart Island has come from diesel generators; previously, residents used their own private generators. As a consequence, electric power is around three times more expensive than in the South Island, at NZ$0.59/kWh in 2016 and NZ$0.85/kWh in 2025. After photovoltaic and wind generation were tested on the island, the government's Provincial Growth Fund put $3.16 million towards building wind turbines on Stewart Island. The effort was defeated by local landowners who refused to grant access to the site through their property and general obstruction efforts by various parties. In June 2025, the government announced a $15 million loan for a solar project on the island. Construction of the 2 MW solar farm and 4 MWh battery energy storage began in May 2026 and commissioning is targeted for January 2027.

== Publicity and promotions ==
Residents of Stewart Island have held a number of mock promotional fundraising events regarding a declaration of independence for the island, and to have it renamed to its original name of "Rakiura". An effort to raise NZ$6,000 for a new swimming pool at the island's school involved selling 50-cent passports for the newly "independent" island. On 31 July 1970, a mock ceremony featured a declaration of independence, and the new republic's flag was unveiled. These efforts were not serious attempts for independence, and Stewart Island remains a part of the New Zealand state.

== See also ==
- Dark sky movement in New Zealand
