= List of extreme temperatures in New Zealand =

List

The highest temperature ever recorded in New Zealand is 42.4 °C (108.3 °F), which was recorded on 7 February 1973 at Rangiora in Canterbury. The lowest temperature ever recorded in New Zealand is −25.6 °C (−14.1 °F), on 17 July 1903 at Ranfurly in the Otago Region.

Map of all-time record temperatures

== Highest temperatures recorded in New Zealand ==
Temperature	Region	Location	Date recorded
42.4 °C (108.3 °F)	Canterbury	Rangiora	7 February 1973
42.3 °C (108.1 °F)	Marlborough	Jordan	7 February 1973
41.6 °C (106.9 °F)	Canterbury	Christchurch	7 February 1973
41.3 °C (106.3 °F)	Canterbury	Timaru	6 February 2011
41.3 °C (106.3 °F)	Canterbury	Ashburton	7 February 1973
41.2 °C (106.2 °F)	Canterbury	Wigram	7 February 1973
40.4 °C (104.7 °F)	Canterbury	Lincoln	7 February 1973
40.3 °C (104.5 °F)	Canterbury	Timaru Airport	6 February 2011
40.0 °C (104.0 °F)	Canterbury	Timaru	22 January 2025
40.0 °C (104.0 °F)	Canterbury	Christchurch Airport	7 February 1973
39.8 °C (103.6 °F)	Canterbury	Timaru Airport	7 February 1973
39.8 °C (103.6 °F)	Canterbury	Ashley Forest	7 February 1973
39.4 °C (102.9 °F)	Canterbury	Darfield	7 February 1973
39.4 °C (102.9 °F)	Canterbury	Temuka	7 February 1973
39.4 °C (102.9 °F)	Canterbury	Ashburton	26 January 2021
39.2 °C (102.6 °F)	Gisborne	Ruatoria	7 February 1973

== Lowest temperatures recorded in New Zealand ==
Temperature	Region	Location	Date recorded
−25.6 °C (−14.1 °F)	Otago	Ranfurly	17 July 1903
−21.6 °C (−6.9 °F)	Otago	Ophir	3 July 1995
−21.6 °C (−6.9 °F)	Otago	Tara Hills	3 July 1995
−21.6 °C (−6.9 °F)	Otago	Lauder	3 July 1995
−21.0 °C (−5.8 °F)	Otago	Tara Hills	24 June 2015
−19.8 °C (−3.6 °F)	Canterbury	Lake Pukaki	23 June 2015
−19.7 °C (−3.5 °F)	Otago	Tara Hills	25 June 2015

== Yearly New Zealand temperature extremes 2000-2025 ==
=== Highest temperatures ===
Year	Temperature °C (°F)	Region	Location	Date
2000	35.0 °C (95.0 °F)	Canterbury	Culverden	4 March
2000	35.0 °C (95.0 °F)	Canterbury	Darfield	4 March
2001	35.3 °C (95.5 °F)	Canterbury	Timaru Airport	4 February
2002	36.5 °C (97.7 °F)	Canterbury	Darfield	31 December
2003	36.0 °C (96.8 °F)	Otago	Middlemarch	31 December
2004	38.4 °C (101.1 °F)	Canterbury	Darfield	1 January
2005	38.7 °C (101.7 °F)	Otago	Alexandra	5 February
2006	36.0 °C (96.8 °F)	Otago	Alexandra	27 January
2006	36.0 °C (96.8 °F)	Otago	Alexandra	28 January
2006	36.0 °C (96.8 °F)	Otago	Alexandra	29 January
2007	33.5 °C (92.3 °F)	Hawke's Bay	Napier Airport	22 January
2008	34.8 °C (94.6 °F)	Canterbury	Timaru Airport	12 January
2008	34.8 °C (94.6 °F)	Canterbury	Timaru Airport	19 March
2008	34.8 °C (94.6 °F)	Manawatū–Whanganui	Waione	22 January
2009	38.0 °C (100.4 °F)	Canterbury	Culverden	8 February
2010	35.6 °C (96.1 °F)	Canterbury	Cheviot	22 February
2011	41.3 °C (106.3 °F)	Canterbury	Timaru	6 February
2012	34.5 °C (94.1 °F)	Gisborne	Gisborne	19 December
2013	35.1 °C (95.2 °F)	Otago	Clyde	5 January
2013	35.1 °C (95.2 °F)	Gisborne	Gisborne	9 January
2013	35.1 °C (95.2 °F)	Gisborne	Gisborne	10 January
2014	35.7 °C (96.3 °F)	Otago	Clyde	20 February
2015	36.4 °C (97.5 °F)	Canterbury	Timaru	16 January
2015	36.4 °C (97.5 °F)	Canterbury	Leeston	21 December
2016	35.5 °C (95.9 °F)	Otago	Alexandra	3 February
2016	35.5 °C (95.9 °F)	Otago	Clyde	3 February
2017	35.5 °C (95.9 °F)	Hawke's Bay	Wairoa	6 February
2018	38.7 °C (101.7 °F)	Otago	Alexandra	30 January
2019	38.4 °C (101.1 °F)	Canterbury	Hanmer Springs	31 January
2020	38.2 °C (100.8 °F)	Gisborne	Gisborne	31 January
2021	39.4 °C (102.9 °F)	Canterbury	Ashburton	26 January
2022	34.7 °C (94.5 °F)	Waikato	Lake Karapiro	3 January
2023	35.6 °C (96.1 °F)	Otago	Middlemarch	4 February
2024	37.0 °C (98.6 °F)	Canterbury	Hanmer Springs	5 February
2025	35.6 °C (96.1 °F)	Bay of Plenty	Kawerau	7 December
2025	36.8 °C (98.2 °F)	Hawke's Bay	Napier	11 January

=== Lowest temperatures ===
Year	Temperature °C (°F)	Region	Location	Date
2000	−12.4 °C (9.7 °F)	Canterbury	Lake Tekapo	24 August
2001	−12.2 °C (10.0 °F)	Canterbury	Hanmer Springs	5 July
2002	−19.1 °C (−2.4 °F)	Otago	Tara Hills	20 June
2003	−14.8 °C (5.4 °F)	Canterbury	Lake Tekapo	13 July
2004	−12.0 °C (10.4 °F)	Canterbury	Fairlie	16 August
2005	−9.5 °C (14.9 °F)	Otago	Ophir	17 July
2006	−14.0 °C (6.8 °F)	Otago	Tara Hills	14 June
2006	−14.0 °C (6.8 °F)	Canterbury	Fairlie	16 August
2007	−15.4 °C (4.3 °F)	Otago	Lauder	18 July
2008	−9.5 °C (14.9 °F)	Canterbury	Mount Cook Village	20 August
2009	−11.7 °C (10.9 °F)	Otago	Middlemarch	19 July
2010	−12.6 °C (9.3 °F)	Canterbury	Lake Tekapo	10 August
2011	−10.2 °C (13.6 °F)	Southland	Manapouri	26 July
2012	−11.8 °C (10.8 °F)	Canterbury	Darfield	7 June
2013	−12.1 °C (10.2 °F)	Canterbury	Lake Tekapo	28 June
2014	−9.8 °C (14.4 °F)	Canterbury	Lake Tekapo	17 July
2015	−21.0 °C (−5.8 °F)	Otago	Tara Hills	24 June
2016	−14.1 °C (6.6 °F)	Canterbury	Mount Cook Aerodrome	20 August
2017	−14.6 °C (5.7 °F)	Canterbury	Lake Tekapo	29 July
2018	−10.4 °C (13.3 °F)	Canterbury	Mount Cook Aerodrome	3 June
2019	−9.2 °C (15.4 °F)	Canterbury	Lake Tekapo	3 June
2020	−12.3 °C (9.9 °F)	Otago	Middlemarch	14 June
2021	−10.8 °C (12.6 °F)	Otago	Tara Hills	27 May
2022	−11.6 °C (11.1 °F)	Canterbury	Mount Cook Aerodrome	17 July
2023	−10.6 °C (12.9 °F)	Otago	Tara Hills	10 June
2024	−11.8 °C (10.8 °F)	Canterbury	Lake Tekapo	3 August
2025	−12.9 °C (8.8 °F)	Canterbury	Mount Cook Aerodrome	8 June
2026	−13.5 °C (7.7 °F)	Canterbury	Lake Tekapo	12 July
