= Tekapo =

- Tekapo River, flows occasionally through the Mackenzie Basin, Canterbury, in New Zealand's South Island,
- Lake Tekapo (town), small town (township) located at the southern end of the lake of the same name in the inland South Island of New Zealand.
- Lake Tekapo, the second-largest of three roughly parallel lakes running north–south along the northern edge of the Mackenzie Basin in the South Island of New Zealand
- Lake Tekapo Airport, Non-Certificated Airport 1.5 nmi (1.7 mi; 2.8 km) west of Lake Tekapo township in the Mackenzie District of the South Island in New Zealand
- Tekapo Ridge, crescent-shaped chain of low peaks
