= Glentanner Aerodrome =

- IATA: GTN; ICAO: NZGT

Summary
- Airport type: Public
- Operator: Mr R K Ivey, Glentanner Station
- Location: Lake Pukaki
- Elevation AMSL: 1,824 ft (556 m)
- Coordinates: 43°54′24″S 170°07′42″E
- Interactive map of Glentanner Aerodrome

Runways
Direction	Length		Surface
Direction	ft	m	Surface
15/33	3,166	965	Asphalt

Glentanner Aerodrome (IATA: GTN, ICAO: NZGT) is an aerodrome located at the north west end of Lake Pukaki in New Zealand. From 1987 onwards to their demise Newmans Air operated Dash-7 aircraft into Glentanner from Christchurch and Queenstown.

Formerly used as a standby airport for Mount Cook Airlines if the Mount Cook Airport was closed due to inclement weather. Paved and capable of handling aircraft up to Hawker Siddeley HS748 size. A small bus transfer terminal with a couple of baggage trolleys were based at the strip.

Air Safaris operates sightseeing flights at this aerodrome.

Dawn Aerospace uses Glentanner for test flights of their Aurora suborbital spaceplane with flights beginning in 2021.

== Operational information ==
- Circuit
  - RWY 15 Left hand
  - RWY 33 Right hand
- Stock graze occasionally, pilots check status.
- Severe turbulence may be encountered in strong winds
- VFR operations may be subject to special procedures.

== Sources ==
- NZAIP Volume 4 AD
