= NZMC =

NZMC may refer to:

- Code for Mount Cook Aerodrome
- New Zealand Motor Corporation
- New Zealand Music Commission
- Royal New Zealand Army Medical Corps
