= Air Safaris (New Zealand airline) =

IATA	ICAO	Call sign
–	SRI	AIRSAFARI
- Founded: 1970
- Hubs: Lake Tekapo
- Fleet size: 8
- Destinations: 5 (charter)
- Headquarters: Lake Tekapo, New Zealand
- Key people: Tim Rayward (Managing Director); Richard Rayward (CEO)
- Website: http://www.airsafaris.co.nz/

Air Safaris is a New Zealand scenic flight and air charter company based at the Lake Tekapo Airport located 2.8 km west of the town of Lake Tekapo, off State Highway 8 in the Mackenzie District of New Zealand. The airline operates from 5 bases: Tekapo, Franz Josef, Glentanner, Twizel and Mt Cook airports. The company logo is a stylised chamois; these are wild goat-like antelope which inhabits the region of the South Island High Country.

== History ==
Air Safaris was established in 1970 at Mesopotamia station to take hunters and hikers into the mountain areas of the South Island. They moved their operations to Lake Tekapo in 1974.

The company has used a wide variety of aircraft: first the Cessna 180, then later the larger Cessna 185, and in 1975 the Cessna 206 and 207. In 1978 the Pilatus Porters arrived fitted with skis that could land and take off on glaciers and snowfields and as demand increased for scenic flights, the 15 seat GAF Nomad entered the fleet in 1981 for use at Lake Tekapo, Glentanner, Franz Josef and Milford Sound airports. On 17 December 1987 the airline purchased Air Timaru and continued to run its services from Timaru to Oamaru and Invercargill using a Piper PA-31 Navajo aircraft. Air Safaris were the first company in New Zealand to buy the Gippsland Airvan in 2009.

From 1991 to 1996, one of the Nomads was used from Timaru to fly the Air Nelson scheduled service to Christchurch as part of their Air New Zealand Link operation. The contract was for Air Safaris to provide two-week day return services, Air Nelson also used them between Christchurch and Hokitika and Mount Cook Airlines for flights south of Christchurch as a backup capacity although all these services have since been discontinued.

In 1996, Air Safaris won an award from the Civil Aviation Authority of New Zealand for safety. Director Kevin Ward said that the 1996 winning organisation, Air Safaris and Services (NZ), "...set standards, and fly to them..".

In 2002, Air Safaris along with the other members of 'Tourism Flight Operators New Zealand' were awarded the Director of Civil Aviation Organisation Award for their efforts towards increasing safety standards. The Director of Civil Aviation John Jones said the Tourism Flight Operators New Zealand was "pursuing standards that will qualify members for the Tourism New Zealand Qualmark brand".

The airline has recently completed a major development at Pukaki airport near Twizel to enable it to offer scenic flights. It has involved construction of a sealed turning bay off the adjacent aircraft taxiway, and a parking area for company aircraft.

In 2013, Air Safaris added a Robinson R44 helicopter to their fleet and began operating scenic helicopter flights in addition to their fixed wing services.

== Accidents and incidents ==
- On 14 September 1998 an Air Safaris Cessna 177B Cardinal, ZK-DKL, crashed in the Mount Cook area while on a scenic flight, killing the pilot and 2 passengers on board. It struck a snow-covered mountain face 11 km northeast of Mount Cook at 11.52 am. The aeroplane was damaged beyond repair. The cause of this accident has not been determined.

== Fleet ==
The GAF N24A Nomad is the largest aircraft in the fleet and is complemented by the smaller Cessna 208B and GA8 Airvan airliners. The 10 seater Pilatus PC-6 Turbo Porter was previously used from 1978 and the Cessna 185 and 206 were the first aircraft in Air Safaris fleet. These have since been retired.

AirSafaris fleet
Aircraft	Number	Passengers
Cessna 208B Grand Caravan	2	13
GA8 Airvan	3	7
GAF N24A Nomad	2	15
Bell 206 Long Ranger	1	6

== Services ==
Air Safaris operate a range of services including: scenic flights around the Mount Cook and Westland National Parks, charter flight services available from their two bases in Lake Tekapo and Franz Josef to many airports around New Zealand and other commercial flights including photography and filming, freight, survey and remote access work. The Lake Tekapo Link are charter flights that are available from both Christchurch and Queenstown airports to Lake Tekapo. These are for passengers who wish to use the scenic flights of Air Safaris such as the Grand Traverse experience.

== Gallery ==
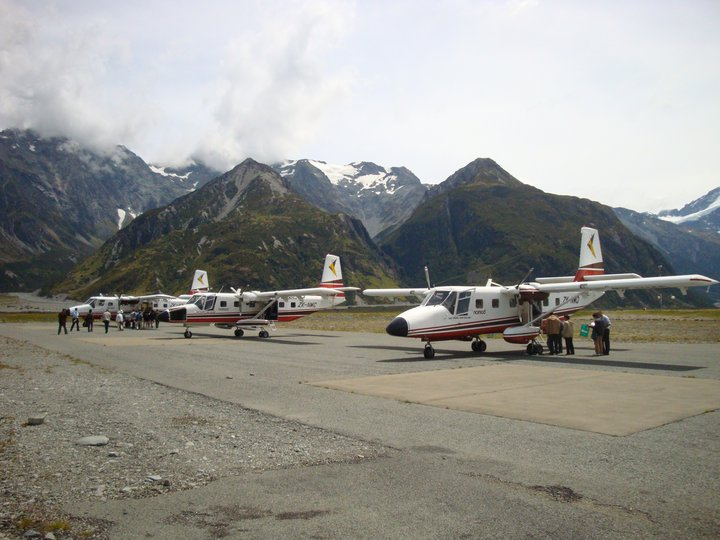
All 3 Air Safaris GAF Nomads together seen here at Mt Cook airport, 1995

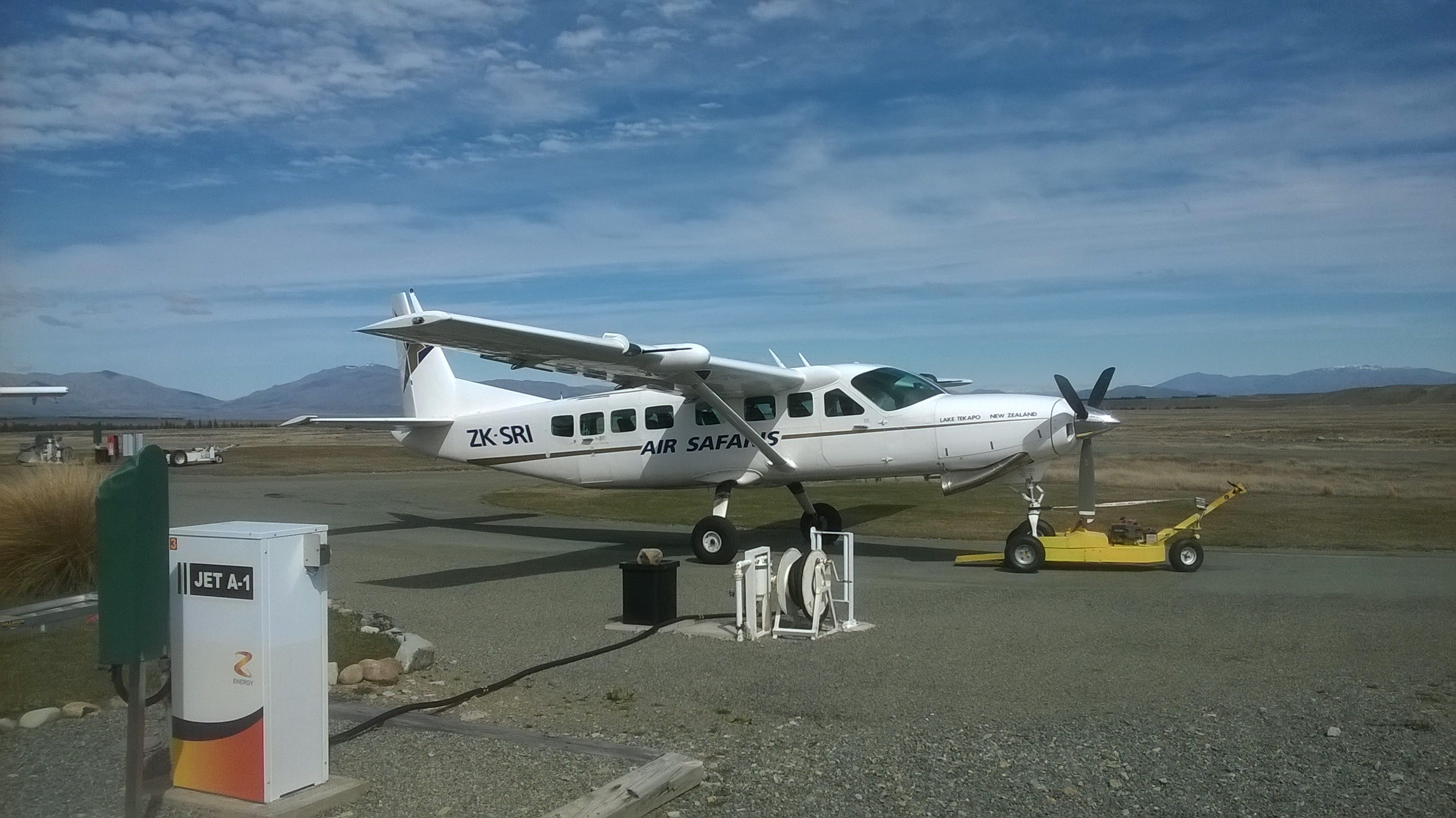
Air Safaris Grand Caravan at Tekapo, 2014

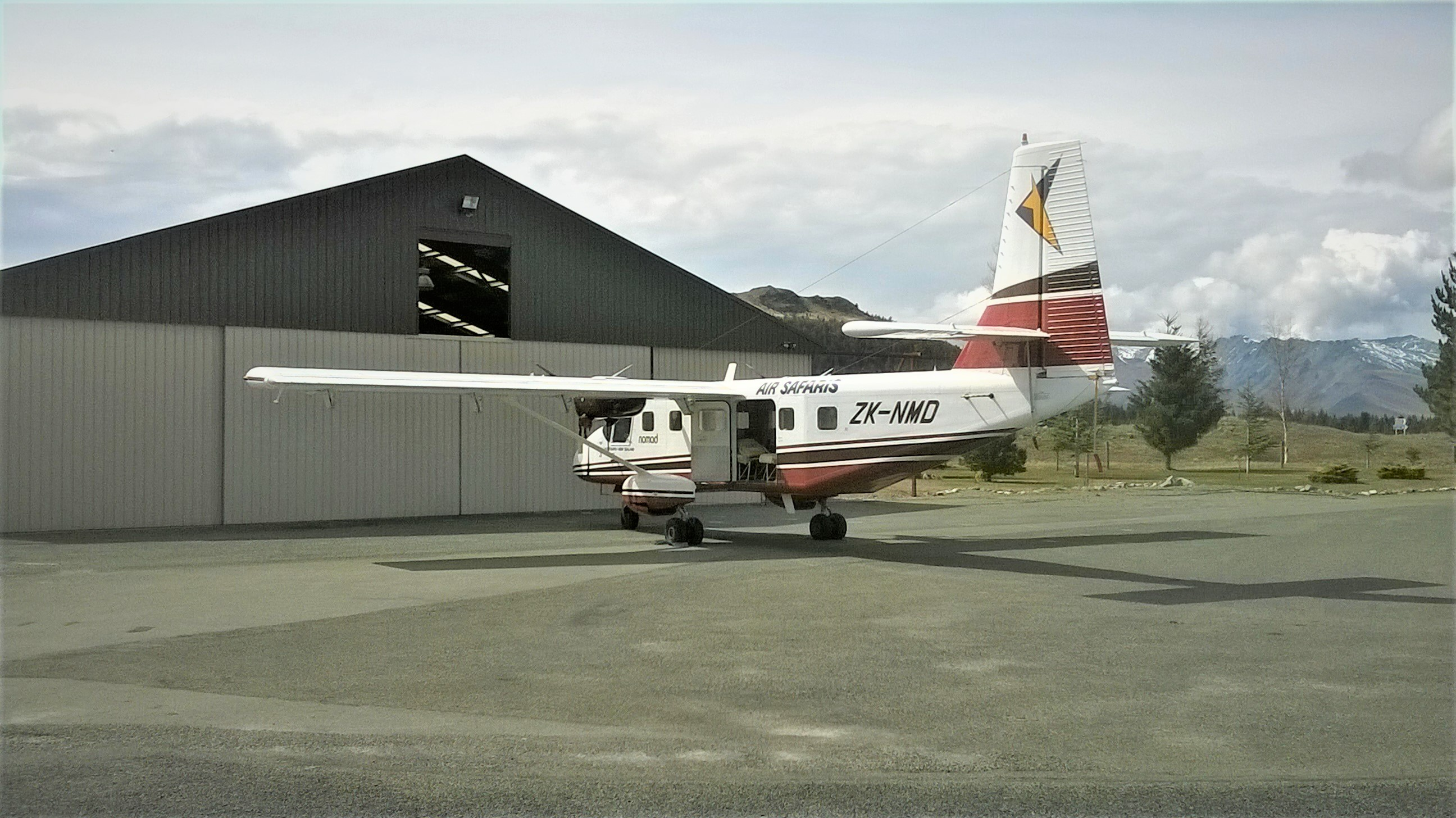
Air Safaris Nomad outside hangar at Tekapo, 2014

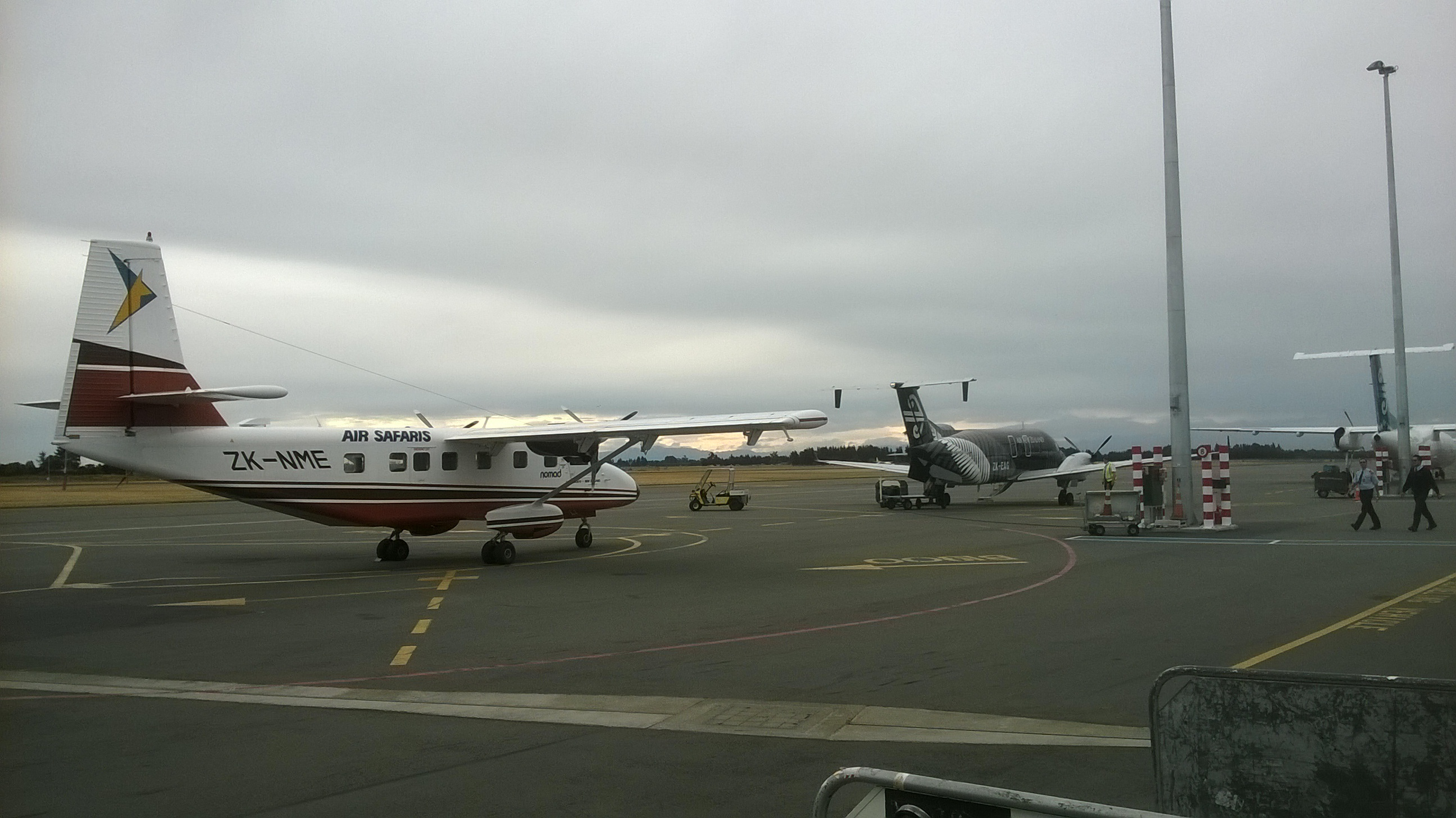
Air Safaris Nomad on gate 3 at Christchurch Airport December 2014.

== See also ==
- Air transport in New Zealand
- List of airlines of New Zealand
- List of general aviation operators of New Zealand
