= Dawn Aerospace =

Aerospace company (e. 2022)

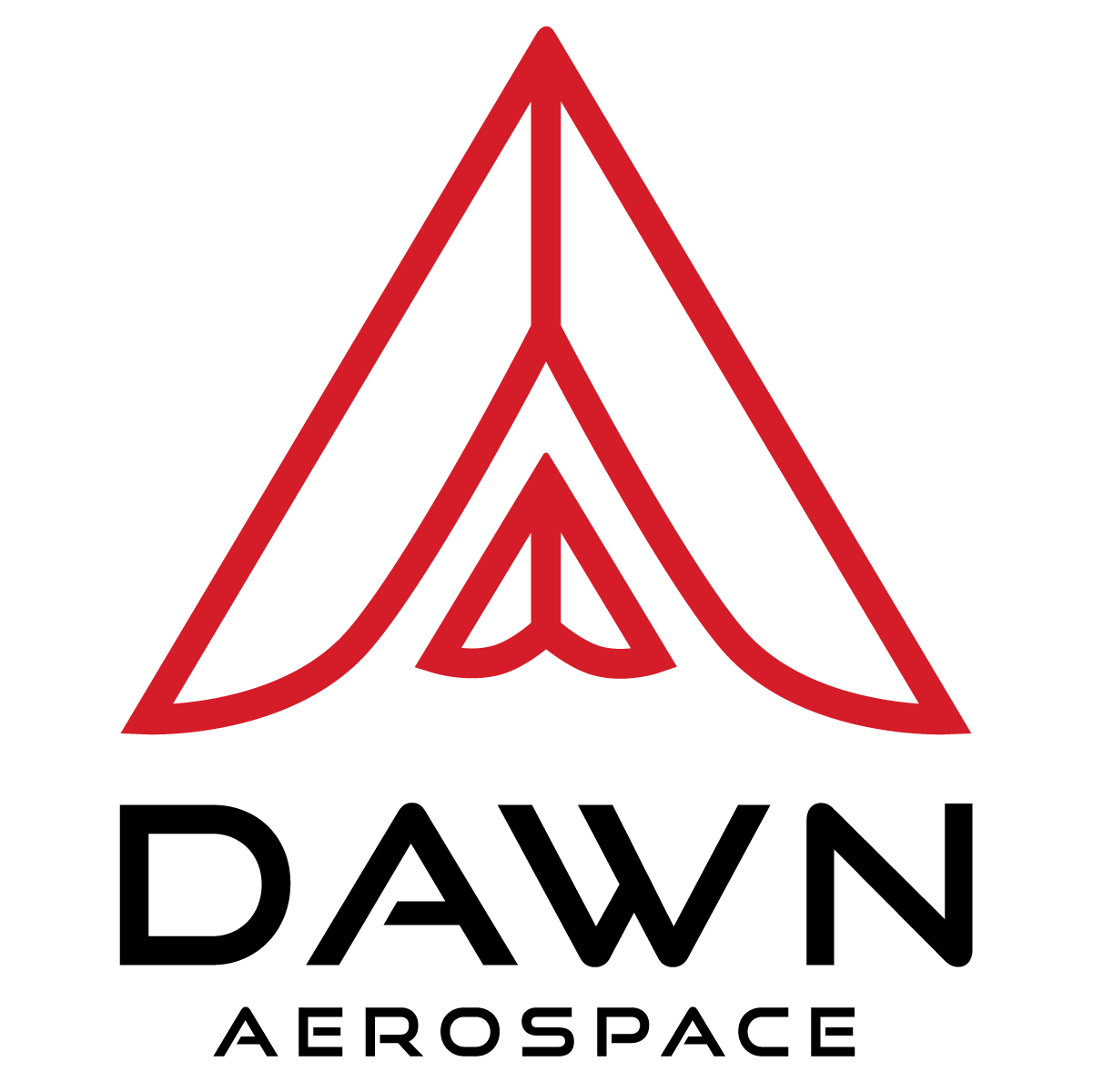
- Type: Private
- Industry: Aerospace
- Founded: 2017; 9 years ago
- Founder: Stefan Powell, James Powell, Jeroen Wink, Tobias Knop, Robert Werner
- Headquarters: Delft, Netherlands and Christchurch, New Zealand.,
- Number of locations: 4 (August 2025)
- Products: CubeDrive, SatDrive, Dawn Mk-II Aurora
- Revenue: NZD $20 million (2022)
- Number of employees: 120+ (August 2025)
- Website: dawnaerospace.com

Dawn Aerospace is a space transportation company building both in-space propulsion systems and a space launch vehicle. The company currently manufactures satellite propulsion systems with nontoxic propellants, as well as an uncrewed suborbital spaceplane with rapidly reusable flight characteristics.

== History ==
Dawn Aerospace was co-founded in 2017 by Stefan Powell (New Zealand / Netherlands dual citizen), Jeroen Wink (from the Netherlands), James Powell (New Zealand / Netherlands dual citizen), Tobias Knop (Germany), and Robert Werner (Germany).

In 2018, Dawn Aerospace raised $3.5m in seed funding from New Zealand, American and Dutch investors. Further investment of an undisclosed figure was made in 2021 by Movac and others.

In 2020, Dawn Aerospace successfully performed atmospheric testing of their Dawn MK II spaceplane, verifying its flight characteristics before future 2023 testing of a larger platform.

== Satellite propulsion hardware ==
Dawn Aerospace currently produces hardware for small satellites, to include thrusters and propellants.

Dawn aerospace has provided the propulsion to Pixxel, an Indian-based space organization. They also have signed contracts with the ESA, contracts with Blue Canyon, now part of Raytheon Technologies, to provide its proprietary mix of propellants for microsatelite operations and ALE Co., Ltd. Japan and UARX Space. In the last case Dawn provided them with its own proprietary propulsion architecture. Dawn Aerospace has also signed contracts with Indonesia's national space agency, working to provide the propellant for a new satellite network dedicated to providing early warning of tsunami and earthquake related phenomena.

=== B20 thruster ===
Dawn Aerospace's B20 thruster is a 20 newton thruster that uses a chemical propellant made up of nitrous oxide and propylene. The innovation is that it replaces hydrazine, a highly toxic chemical compound often used in satellites, with a non-toxic propellant. This allows for quicker launches and more safe handling of the rocket while on the ground, increasing launch cadence. In 2021, D-Orbit, a space logistics firm, validated the thrusters on its PULSE space tug mission, firing six B20 thrusters.

=== B1 thruster ===
Another in-space propulsion rocket motor, the B1 thruster is a 1 newton thruster for satellites. It is manufactured as a single structure using Inconel 718. In 2021 it was flown on the Hiber-Three and Hiber-Four 3U CubeSat, which were respectively launched by Soyuz-2 and Falcon9 on the SpaceX Transporter-1 mission, SpaceX's first dedicated SmallSat Rideshare program mission.

== Dawn Mk-II Aurora spaceplane ==
Dawn Aerospace announced the Mk-II Aurora uncrewed suborbital spaceplane in July 2020. The goal for the prototype is to achieve same-day full re-usability, taking off from conventional airports and reaching altitudes above 100 km for experiments in microgravity, hypersonics, earth observation, and atmospheric science. The spaceplane was initially tested with jet engines at low altitudes and then later with rocket engines at progressively high altitudes. The Mk2 Aurora was jointly developed in both the Netherlands and New Zealand.

=== Development milestones ===
In 2021, the Mk-II Aurora flew for the first time during five test flights over the South Island of New Zealand between 28 and 30 July. On 9 December 2021, Dawn Aerospace announced it had received a license to fly its suborbital spaceplane from a conventional New Zealand Airport, working with the Civil Aviation Authority of New Zealand (CAA) and New Zealand Space Agency. By December 2022, Dawn Aerospace had conducted 48 successful tests below 9000 ft altitude using jet engines to demonstrate the spaceplane platform, verifying its flight characteristics before future 2023 testing of a larger platform.

In March 2023, the CAA certified the craft for rocket-powered (HTP/kerosene) test flights. The first three rocket-powered test flights were conducted between 29 and 31 March 2023 from Glentanner Aerodrome. Subsequent certification for supersonic flight was received from the CAA in July 2024. On 12 November 2024, the Mk-II Aurora spaceplane broke the sound barrier for the first time, becoming the first airplane designed and manufactured in New Zealand to do so. The flight, the spaceplane's 57th, attained a top speed of Mach 1.1 and a maximum height of 82,000 ft (25,000 m).

Although not explicitly stated by Dawn Aerospace, the Mk.2 Aurora is likely also the first supersonic civil aircraft designed and built in the Netherlands. The Mk.2 Aurora was developed collaboratively between the Dutch and New Zealand offices of Dawn Aerospace, with much of the design and manufacturing taking place at the company's facilities in the Netherlands. This is supported by an interview with co-founder Jeroen Wink, published in the Dutch newspaper NRC in 2023. During the interview, the newspaper was given a tour of the factory where the Mk.2 Aurora was built in Delft, the Netherlands. While the contributions of the Dutch branch to the Mk.2 Aurora are seldom highlighted in the company's English-language marketing, the reasons for this remain unclear. It is likely tied to the fact that a significant portion of Dawn Aerospace's investors are based in New Zealand, and as a result, the company may prefer to brand the Mk.2 Aurora as a "Kiwi" product.

In November 2024, Dawn Aerospace's rocket-powered aircraft successfully completed its first supersonic flight.

On 6 March 2025, Dawn's high-altitude license was updated, officially permitting payload flights on Aurora. This development allowed commercial flights of the spaceplane.

== Facilities ==
Dawn Aerospace operates from four global offices: one each in the Netherlands, New Zealand, France and the United States. Dawn Aerospace operates a dual-headquarter model, with headquarters in Delft, the Netherlands, and Christchurch, New Zealand. Its workforce is approximately evenly split between the two locations, with smaller teams based in France and the United States. The company's co-founders are also divided roughly equally between the Delft and Christchurch offices. The holding company of Dawn Aerospace is registered in New Zealand.
