= Lake Tekapo Airport =

Airport in Tekapo, New Zealand

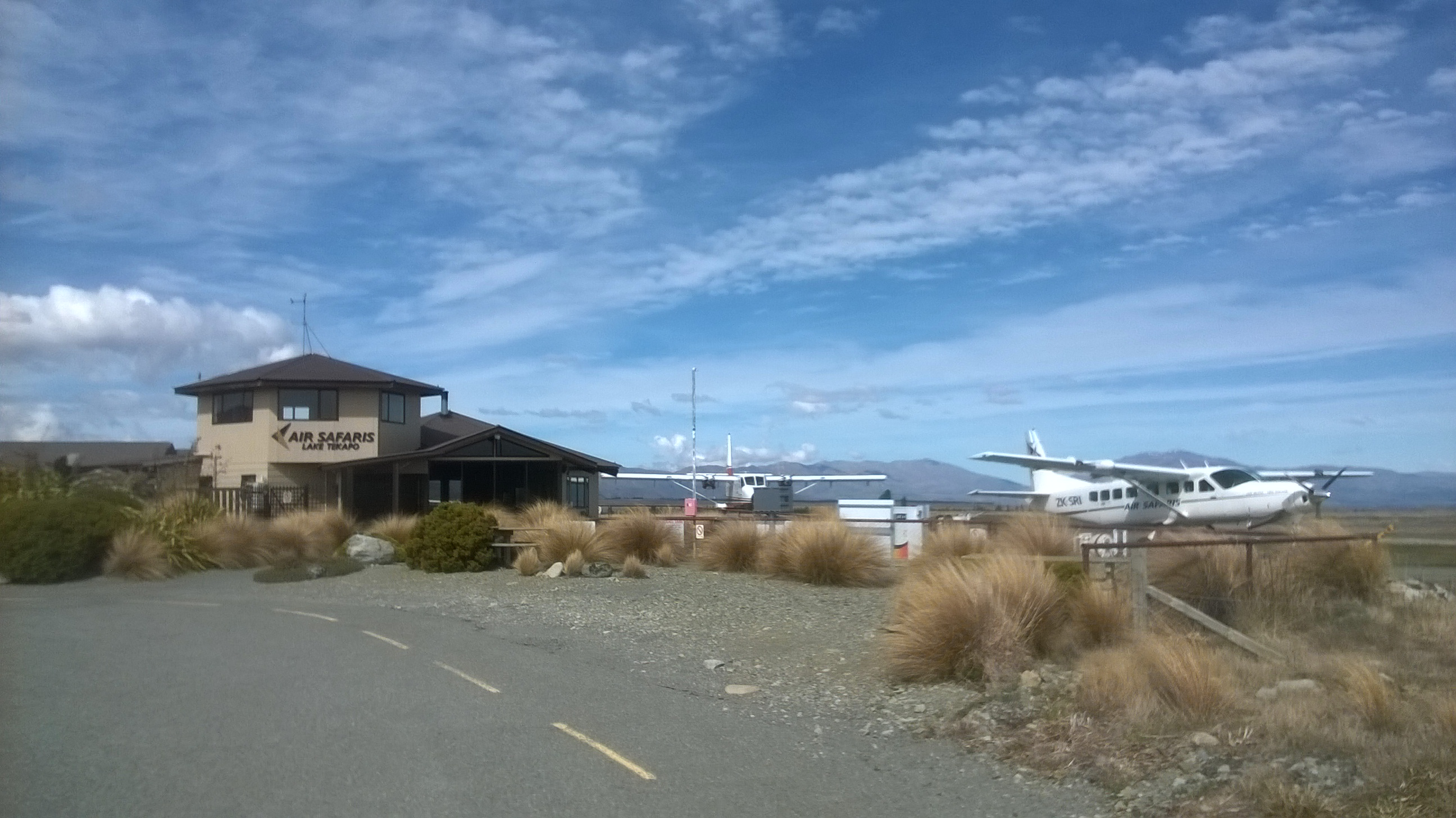
- The airport terminal in 2014
- IATA: none; ICAO: NZTL

Summary
- Airport type: Private
- Operator: Air Safaris Ltd
- Serves: Lake Tekapo
- Elevation AMSL: 2,496 ft / 761 m
- Coordinates: 44°00′18″S 170°26′37″E
- Interactive map of Lake Tekapo Airport

Runways
Direction	Length		Surface
Direction	m	ft	Surface
11/29	950	3,117	Bitumen

Lake Tekapo Airport (IATA: N/A, ICAO: NZTL) is a Non-Certificated Airport 1.5 NM (2.8 km; 1.7 mi) west of Lake Tekapo township in the Mackenzie District of the South Island in New Zealand. The airport was constructed by Air Safaris in 1974 for scenic charter flights over the Southern Alps.

== Operational information ==
Movements restricted to paved areas. Non-standard RWY markings for Air Safaris reference and use only. CAUTION: Main highway on approach to RWY 11. Maintain adequate clearance. CAUTION: Tekapo/Mackenzie heliport located 1.5NM to SW of aerodrome. VFR operations within NZB978 Southern Alps MBZ are subject to special procedures. Refer to ENR 1.16 VFR Procedures, Mount Cook/Westland.
LED emergency lighting available – full length. VFR night operations limited to Air Safaris approved pilots. Fuel: Greenstone Energy Swipecard AVGAS, Jet A1

== Gallery ==
Lake Tekapo Airport
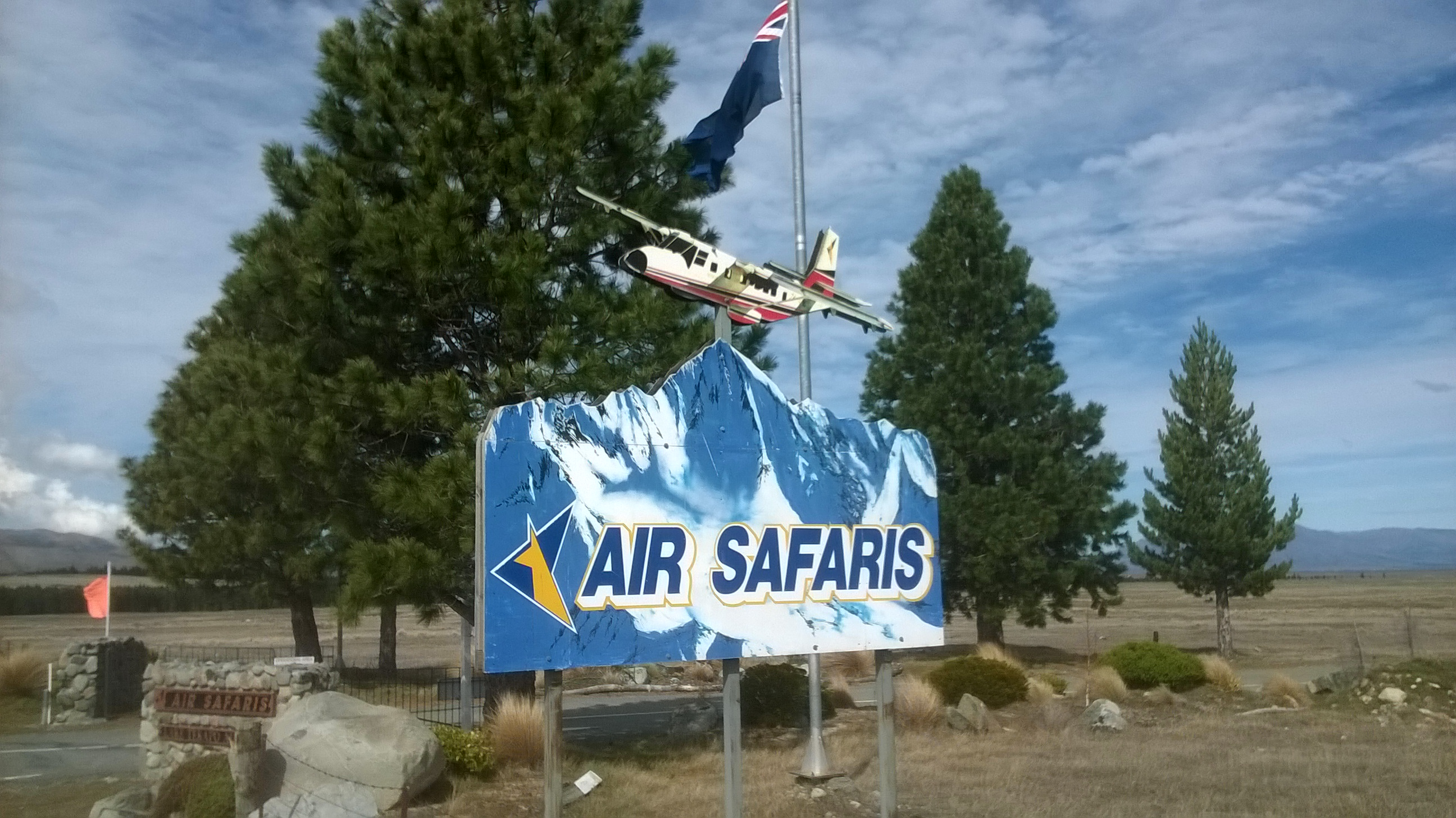
The sign on the highway by the Lake Tekapo Airport, 2014

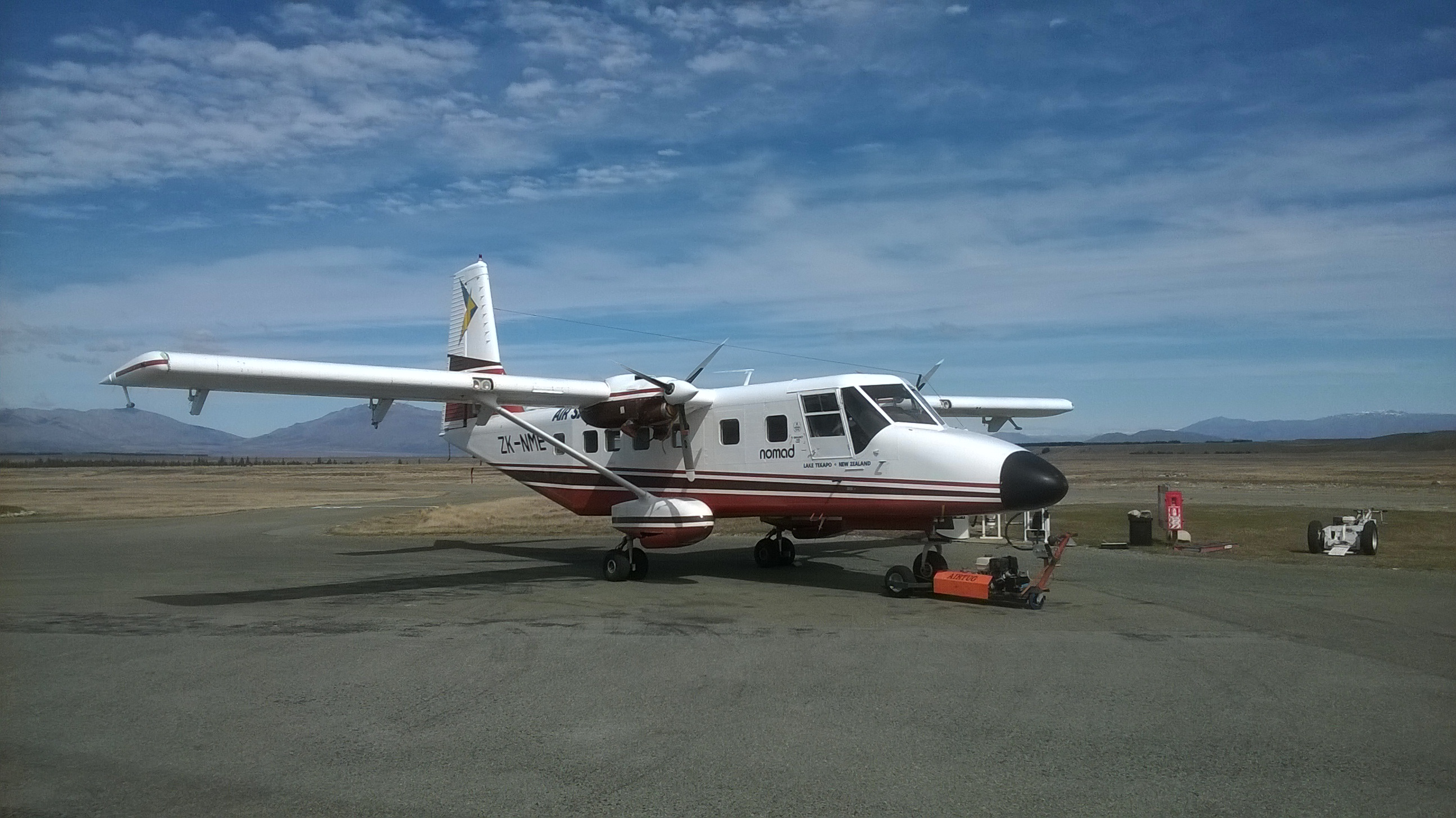
Air Safaris Gaf Nomad at Lake Tekapo Airport, 2014

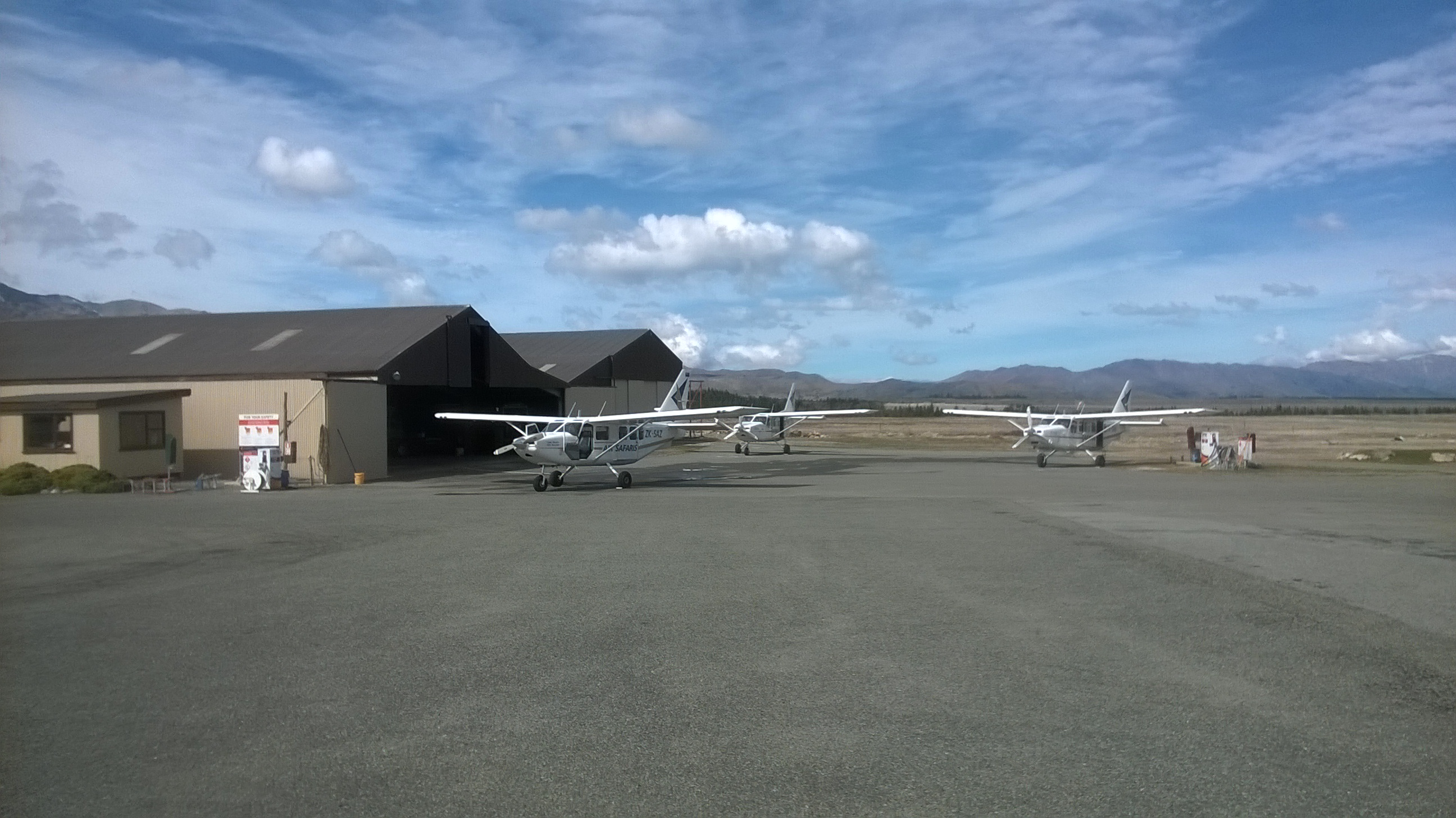
View of Apron at the Lake Tekapo airport, 2014

== Sources ==
- NZAIP Volume 4 AD
- AIP New Zealand (PDF)
