= Lake Tekapo (town) =

Town in Canterbury, New Zealand

Lake Tekapo Māori: Takapō
- Rural settlement
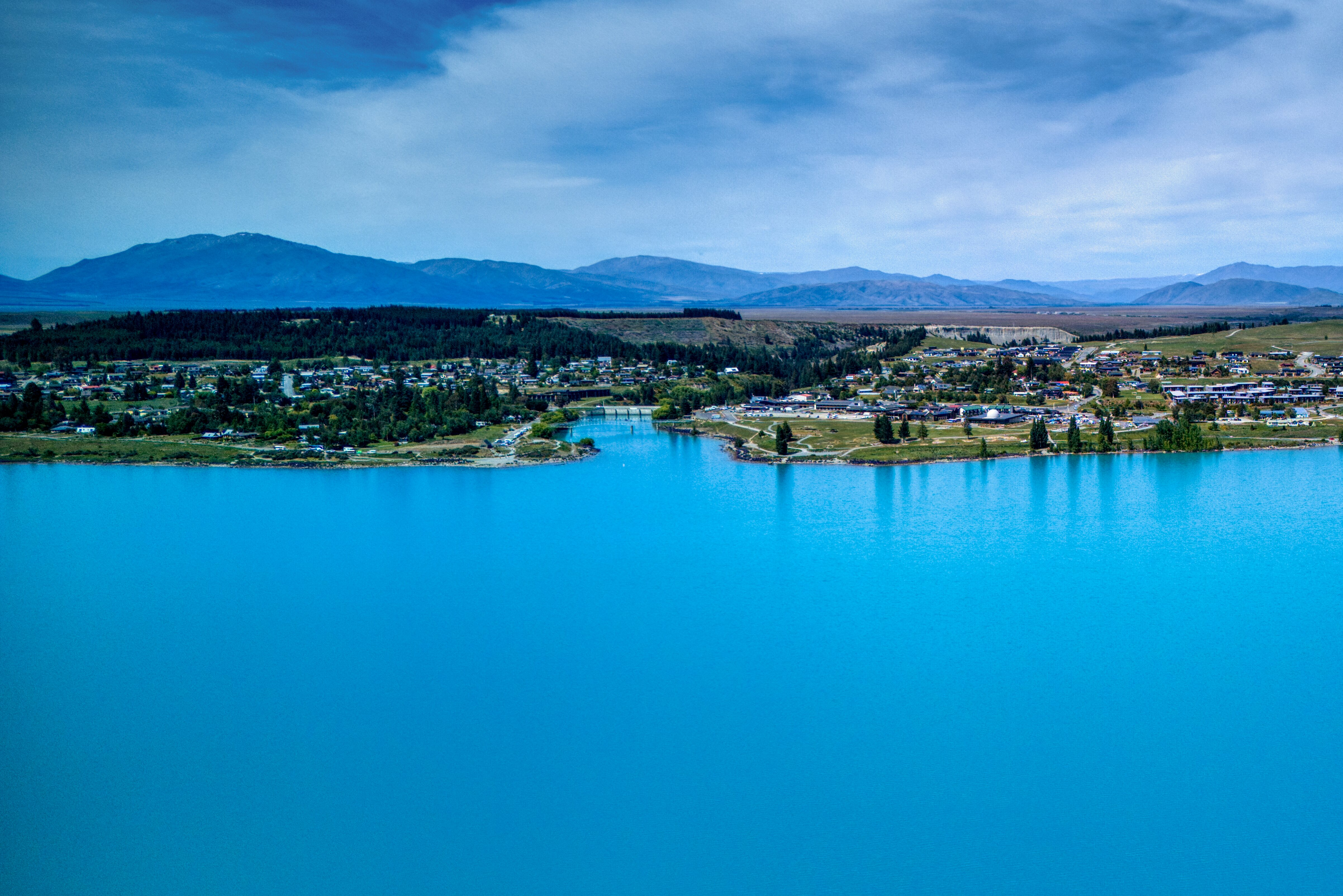
- Interactive map of Lake Tekapo
- Coordinates: 44°00′18″S 170°28′39″E
- Country: New Zealand
- Region: Canterbury
- Territorial authority: Mackenzie District
- Ward: Tekapo Ward
- Community: Tekapo Community
- Electorates: Waitaki; Te Tai Tonga (Māori)

Government
  - Territorial authority: Mackenzie District Council
  - Regional council: Environment Canterbury
  - Mayor of Mackenzie: Scott Aronsen
  - Waitaki MP: Miles Anderson
  - Te Tai Tonga MP: Tākuta Ferris

Area
  - Total: 4.19 km^{2} (1.62 sq mi)

Population (June 2025)
  - Total: 620
  - Density: 150/km^{2} (380/sq mi)
- Postcode(s): 7999

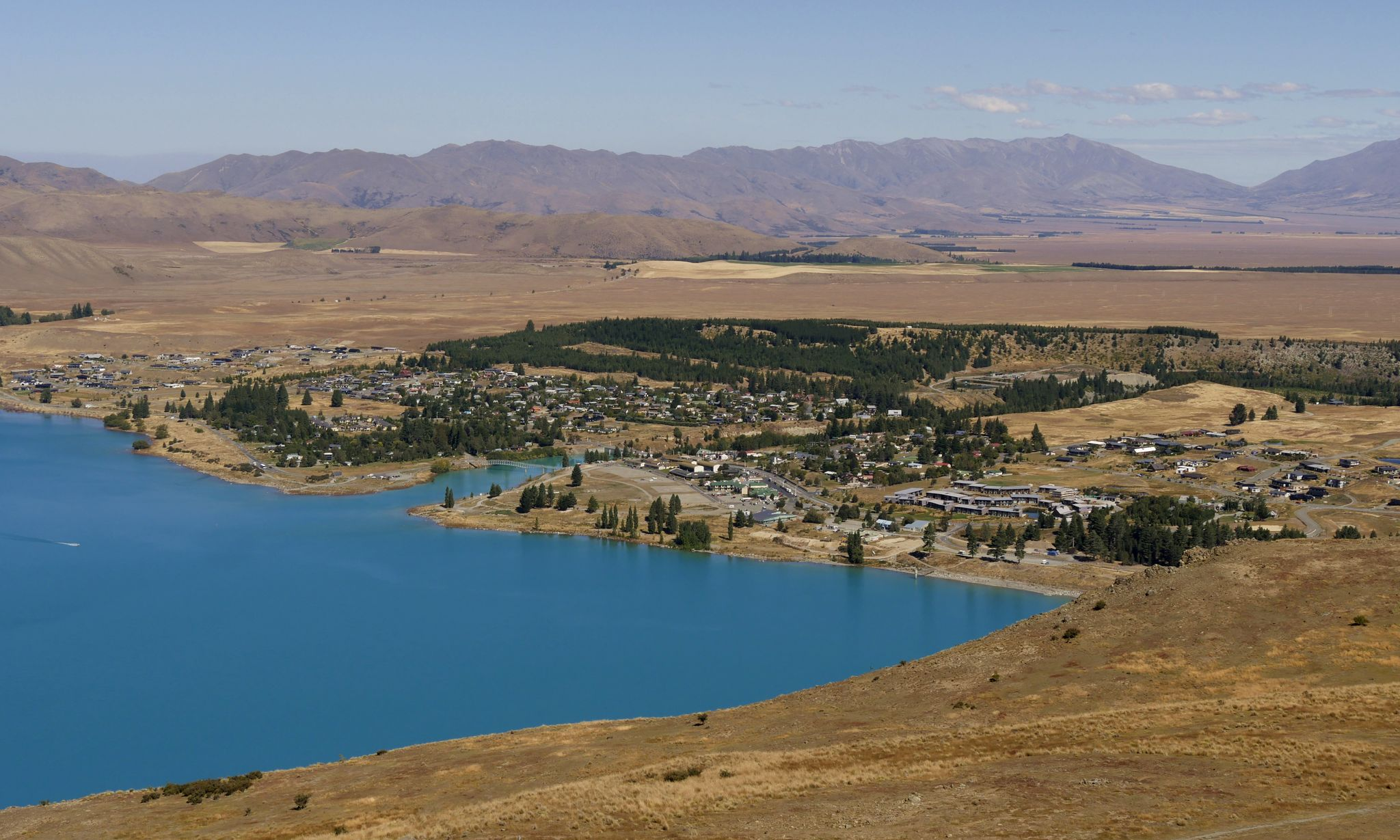
Lake Tekapo township as seen from the nearby Mount John University Observatory

Lake Tekapo (often known simply as Tekapo (Māori: Takapō) to avoid confusion with the lake itself) is a small township located at the southern end of the lake of the same name in the inland South Island of New Zealand. It had 558 residents according to the 2018 census, being one of five settlements in the sparsely populated Mackenzie Basin.

State Highway 8 runs directly through the township – 227 kilometres (141 mi) from Christchurch and 256 kilometres (159 mi) from Queenstown. Daily shuttle services link Lake Tekapo to Christchurch and Queenstown. The lake is a popular tourist destination, and several resort hotels are located at the township. Lake Tekapo Airport is located 5 kilometres (3.1 mi) west of the town where local tourism operator Air Safaris is based. Twizel lies 60 km (39 minutes drive) south of Lake Tekapo via Lake Pukaki and Burkes Pass lies 21 km (15 minutes drive) west along State Highway 8.

== History ==
The Māori were the first people to discover the Mackenzie Basin. The name Tekapo, a misspelling of Takapō, is derived from the te reo Māori words taka (sleeping mat) and pō (night). Takapō means "To leave in haste at night".

The Mackenzie Basin became known to Europeans in 1855 when, in order to find a less conspicuous route, James Mackenzie, a Scottish sheep thief, ventured inland and discovered the high country that now bears his name. In 1857, John and Barbara Hay established the first sheep farm in Mackenzie on the shore of Lake Tekapo.

Lake Tekapo township started to grow after the construction of hydropower stations in the 1940s. Prior to this, the town consisted of "two station homesteads, a private hotel, and several holiday cottages". The project was delayed due to World War II, but it was eventually completed and commissioned in 1951. The control gates built across the outlet of Lake Tekapo regulate the amount of water entering the Tekapo River. These were completed in 1940. State Highway 8 runs across the top of them.

After the completion of the hydroelectric scheme, the town of Lake Tekapo returned to being a small town. Visitor numbers increased in the 1960s with skiers and ice skaters visiting in winter months. The population declined in the 1980s to a total of 189 residents in 1991. The population increased in the 1990s with the population reaching 294 residents in 1996.

Tekapo is expected to grow significantly between 2020 and 2050. The MacKenzie District Council expects the district’s population will jump from 4950 to 9050, dwellings 3872 to 6120, jobs 1876 to 4618, and peak day visitors 17,378 to 61,253.

The MacKenzie District Council announced in 2021 that it will start using the dual names of Tekapo and Takapō when referring to Lake Tekapo (Tekapo is an incorrect spelling of Takapō, the Māori name for Lake Tekapo).

== Demographics ==
Statistics New Zealand describes Tekapō as a rural settlement, which covers 4.19 km^{2} (1.62 sq mi). It had an estimated population of 620 as of June 2025, with a population density of 148 people per km^{2}. It is part of the Mackenzie Lakes statistical area.

Historical population
Year	Pop.	±% p.a.
2006	318	—
2013	363	+1.91%
2018	558	+8.98%
2023	534	−0.88%

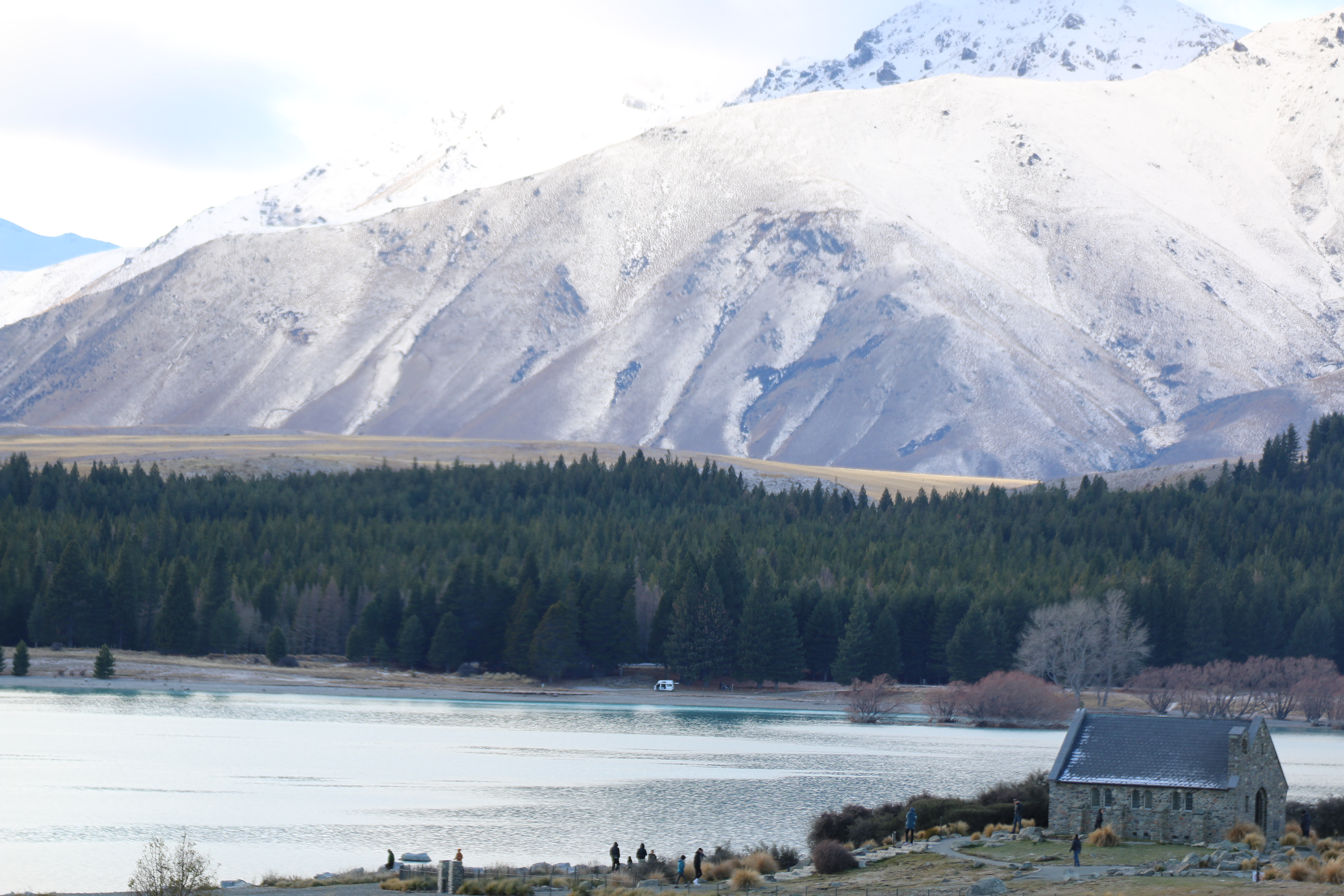
Church of the Good Shepherd

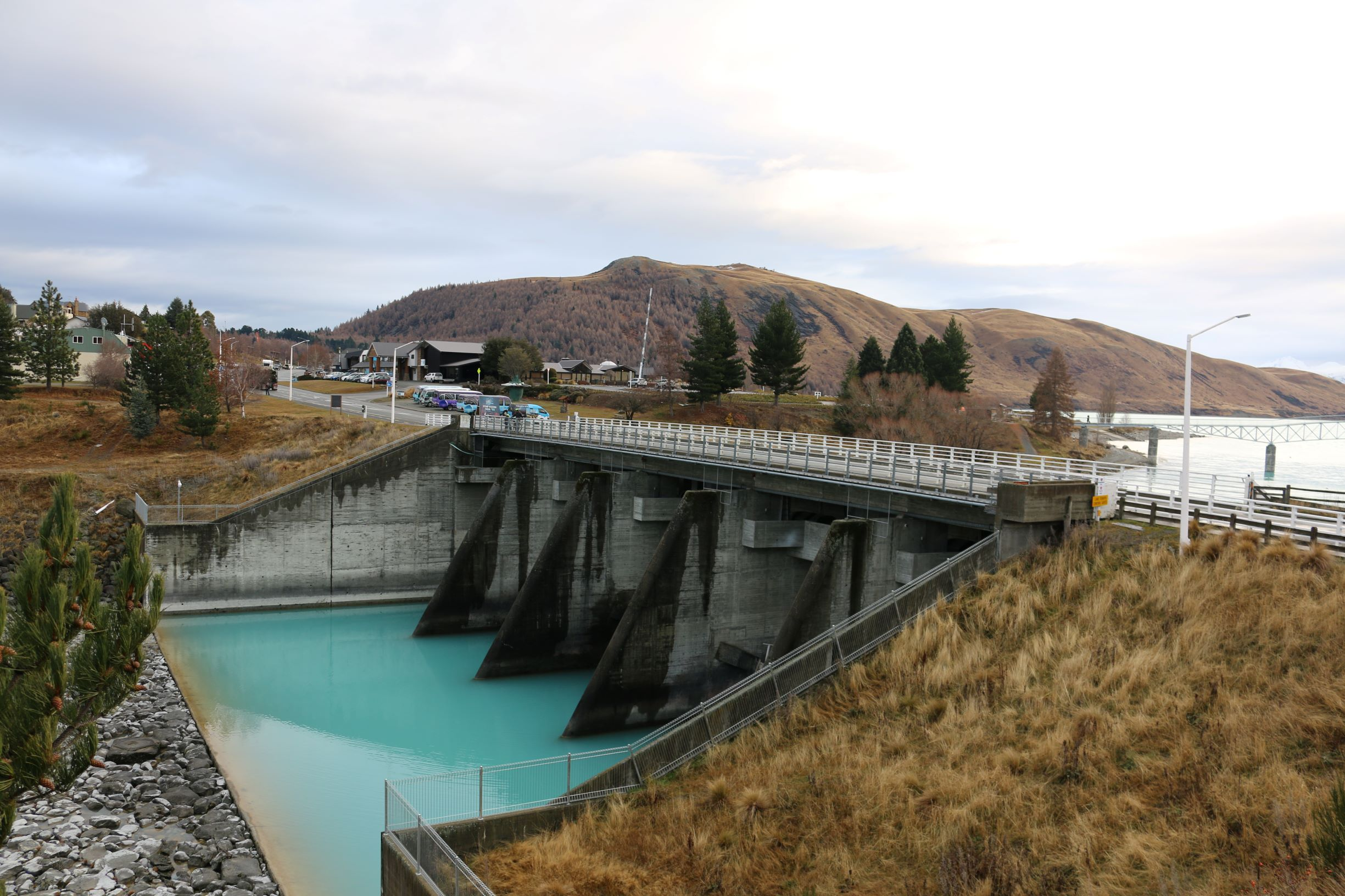
The Lake Tekapo control gates regulate the amount of water reaching the Tekapo river (July 2020)

Tekapō had a population of 534 in the 2023 New Zealand census, a decrease of 24 people (−4.3%) since the 2018 census, and an increase of 171 people (47.1%) since the 2013 census. There were 282 males, 249 females, and 3 people of other genders in 330 dwellings. 6.7% of people identified as LGBTIQ+. The median age was 36.5 years (compared with 38.1 years nationally). There were 63 people (11.8%) aged under 15 years, 108 (20.2%) aged 15 to 29, 285 (53.4%) aged 30 to 64, and 75 (14.0%) aged 65 or older.

People could identify as more than one ethnicity. The results were 56.7% European (Pākehā); 4.5% Māori; 1.1% Pasifika; 34.8% Asian; 6.7% Middle Eastern, Latin American and African New Zealanders (MELAA); and 2.8% other, which includes people giving their ethnicity as "New Zealander". English was spoken by 93.8%, Māori by 0.6%, and other languages by 41.0%. No language could be spoken by 1.7% (e.g. too young to talk). The percentage of people born overseas was 55.1, compared with 28.8% nationally.

Religious affiliations were 27.0% Christian, 1.7% Hindu, 2.2% Islam, 2.8% Buddhist, and 2.2% other religions. People who answered that they had no religion were 59.6%, and 5.1% of people did not answer the census question.

Of those at least 15 years old, 156 (33.1%) people had a bachelor's or higher degree, 177 (37.6%) had a post-high school certificate or diploma, and 138 (29.3%) people exclusively held high school qualifications. The median income was $43,300, compared with $41,500 nationally. 39 people (8.3%) earned over $100,000 compared to 12.1% nationally. The employment status of those at least 15 was 333 (70.7%) full-time, 63 (13.4%) part-time, and 6 (1.3%) unemployed.

== Climate ==
Lake Tekapo has an oceanic climate (Köppen climate classification: Cfb) with mild, sunny summers and moderately cold, frosty winters. Nights can be cold year round, with air frosts occurring even in summer. Precipitation is fairly consistent throughout the year, with an average of 74 days with at least 1mm of rainfall and 12 days with snowfall. Lake Tekapo's yearly average of 2505 hours of sunshine frequently puts it in the top 5 sunniest places in New Zealand.

From 1991–2020 every year an average of 2.8 days failed to rise above freezing and 22.5 days reached 25 °C (77 °F), while an average of 101.6 nights dropped below freezing and 2.8 nights dropped to −10 °C (14 °F). The lowest daily maximum temperature ever recorded at Lake Tekapo was −6.7 °C (20 °F) on 10 July 1971, while the highest daily minimum was 21.5 °C (71 °F) on 3 February 2020 and the highest diurnal temperature range was 33.6 °C (60.5 °F) on 3 January 1944 with a low of −3.2 °C (26 °F) and high of 30.4 °C (87 °F).

Climate data for Lake Tekapo, elevation 762 m (2,500 ft), (1991–2020 normals, extremes 1925–present)
Month	Jan	Feb	Mar	Apr	May	Jun	Jul	Aug	Sep	Oct	Nov	Dec	Year
Record high °C (°F)	35.0 (95.0)	34.0 (93.2)	30.7 (87.3)	26.1 (79.0)	22.2 (72.0)	18.5 (65.3)	17.6 (63.7)	21.9 (71.4)	24.8 (76.6)	26.1 (79.0)	28.3 (82.9)	30.6 (87.1)	35.0 (95.0)
Mean maximum °C (°F)	30.4 (86.7)	29.2 (84.6)	26.4 (79.5)	22.2 (72.0)	17.8 (64.0)	14.9 (58.8)	12.8 (55.0)	15.2 (59.4)	19.8 (67.6)	22.4 (72.3)	25.5 (77.9)	27.3 (81.1)	31.2 (88.2)
Mean daily maximum °C (°F)	22.2 (72.0)	22.2 (72.0)	19.5 (67.1)	15.3 (59.5)	11.5 (52.7)	7.4 (45.3)	6.6 (43.9)	8.8 (47.8)	12.4 (54.3)	15.2 (59.4)	17.3 (63.1)	20.1 (68.2)	14.9 (58.8)
Daily mean °C (°F)	15.4 (59.7)	15.2 (59.4)	12.7 (54.9)	9.4 (48.9)	6.4 (43.5)	2.7 (36.9)	1.9 (35.4)	3.8 (38.8)	6.7 (44.1)	9.0 (48.2)	10.9 (51.6)	13.4 (56.1)	9.0 (48.2)
Mean daily minimum °C (°F)	8.5 (47.3)	8.2 (46.8)	6.0 (42.8)	3.5 (38.3)	1.4 (34.5)	−1.9 (28.6)	−2.8 (27.0)	−1.2 (29.8)	1.0 (33.8)	2.8 (37.0)	4.5 (40.1)	6.8 (44.2)	3.1 (37.6)
Mean minimum °C (°F)	1.0 (33.8)	2.1 (35.8)	−0.3 (31.5)	−2.4 (27.7)	−4.0 (24.8)	−7.8 (18.0)	−8.6 (16.5)	−7.4 (18.7)	−4.1 (24.6)	−4.0 (24.8)	−1.8 (28.8)	0.5 (32.9)	−10.5 (13.1)
Record low °C (°F)	−3.2 (26.2)	−2.2 (28.0)	−5.1 (22.8)	−6.5 (20.3)	−11.1 (12.0)	−15.6 (3.9)	−14.8 (5.4)	−13.8 (7.2)	−10.1 (13.8)	−8.3 (17.1)	−7.4 (18.7)	−7.0 (19.4)	−15.6 (3.9)
Average rainfall mm (inches)	38.1 (1.50)	42.2 (1.66)	29.2 (1.15)	51.0 (2.01)	71.6 (2.82)	52.1 (2.05)	50.3 (1.98)	38.2 (1.50)	33.8 (1.33)	44.9 (1.77)	42.3 (1.67)	41.1 (1.62)	534.8 (21.06)
Average rainy days (≥ 1.0 mm)	4.9	4.4	4.8	5.9	7.8	7.2	6.8	7.2	6.4	7.3	5.9	6.2	74.8
Average relative humidity (%)	58.6	67.2	72.5	71.4	77.2	81.7	78.5	76.6	65.6	64.1	60.2	61.1	69.6
Mean monthly sunshine hours	267.4	236.8	226.6	194.5	151.4	143.5	148.6	183.9	209.9	233.2	252.0	256.8	2,504.6
Source 1: NIWA Climate Data
Source 2: CliFlo

Climate data for Mount John, elevation 1,027 m (3,369 ft) (1971–2000)
Month	Jan	Feb	Mar	Apr	May	Jun	Jul	Aug	Sep	Oct	Nov	Dec	Year
Mean daily maximum °C (°F)	19.3 (66.7)	19.6 (67.3)	16.7 (62.1)	12.8 (55.0)	9.0 (48.2)	5.7 (42.3)	4.6 (40.3)	5.9 (42.6)	9.4 (48.9)	12.3 (54.1)	14.5 (58.1)	17.0 (62.6)	12.2 (54.0)
Daily mean °C (°F)	13.7 (56.7)	14.0 (57.2)	11.6 (52.9)	8.7 (47.7)	5.4 (41.7)	2.7 (36.9)	1.6 (34.9)	2.6 (36.7)	5.2 (41.4)	7.6 (45.7)	9.6 (49.3)	11.5 (52.7)	7.8 (46.2)
Mean daily minimum °C (°F)	8.1 (46.6)	8.3 (46.9)	6.5 (43.7)	4.5 (40.1)	1.8 (35.2)	−0.4 (31.3)	−1.6 (29.1)	−0.8 (30.6)	0.9 (33.6)	2.9 (37.2)	4.6 (40.3)	6.1 (43.0)	3.4 (38.1)
Average rainfall mm (inches)	42.3 (1.67)	32.9 (1.30)	51.7 (2.04)	56.5 (2.22)	53.6 (2.11)	50.7 (2.00)	44.8 (1.76)	60.9 (2.40)	43.3 (1.70)	57.5 (2.26)	40.8 (1.61)	50.9 (2.00)	585.9 (23.07)
Mean monthly sunshine hours	251.1	248.2	209.0	167.4	150.7	149.9	138.5	156.3	182.2	207.2	253.2	258.0	2,371.7
Source: NIWA

== Attractions ==
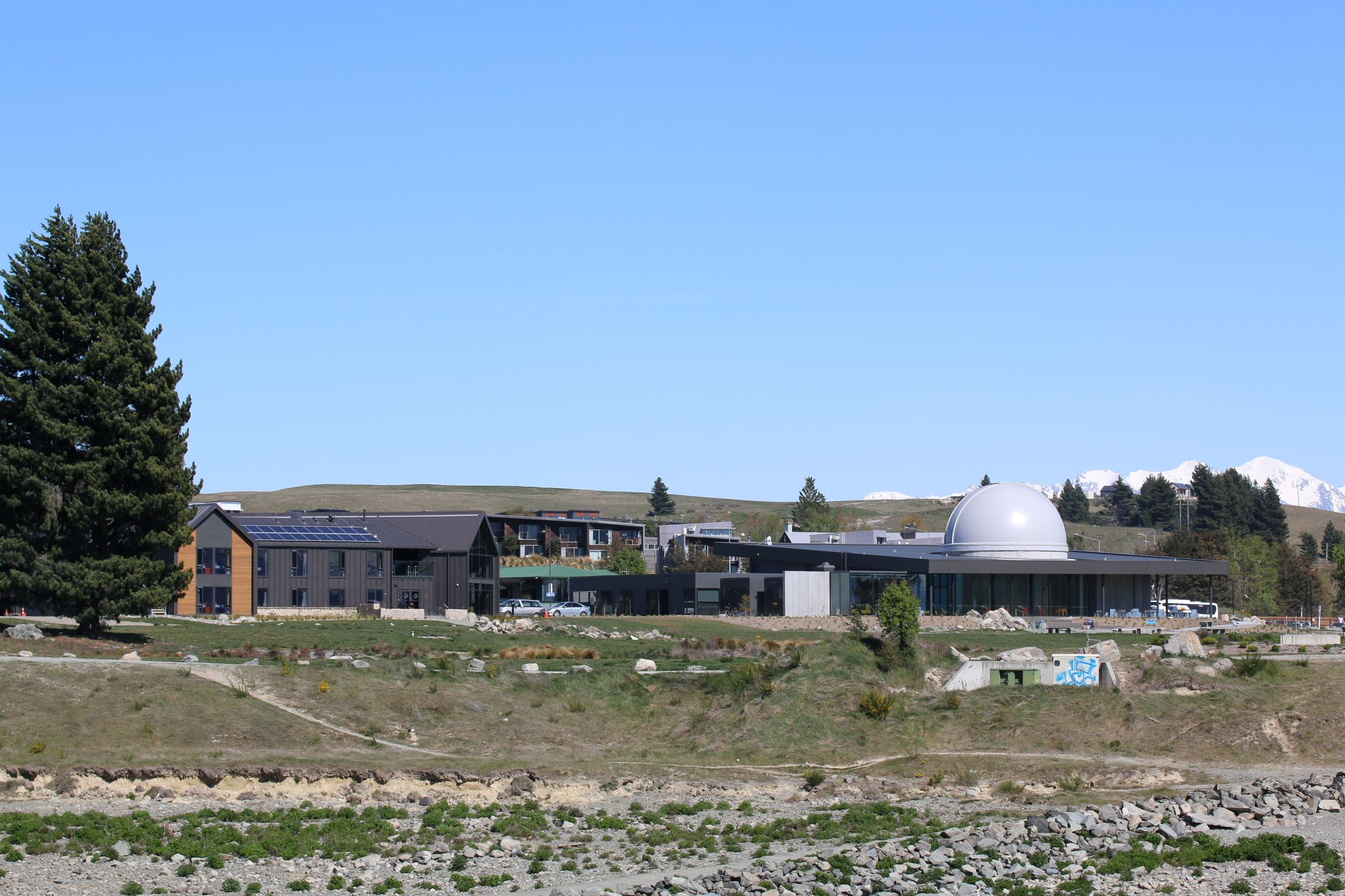
Dark-Sky Project Observatory (right) (October 2019)

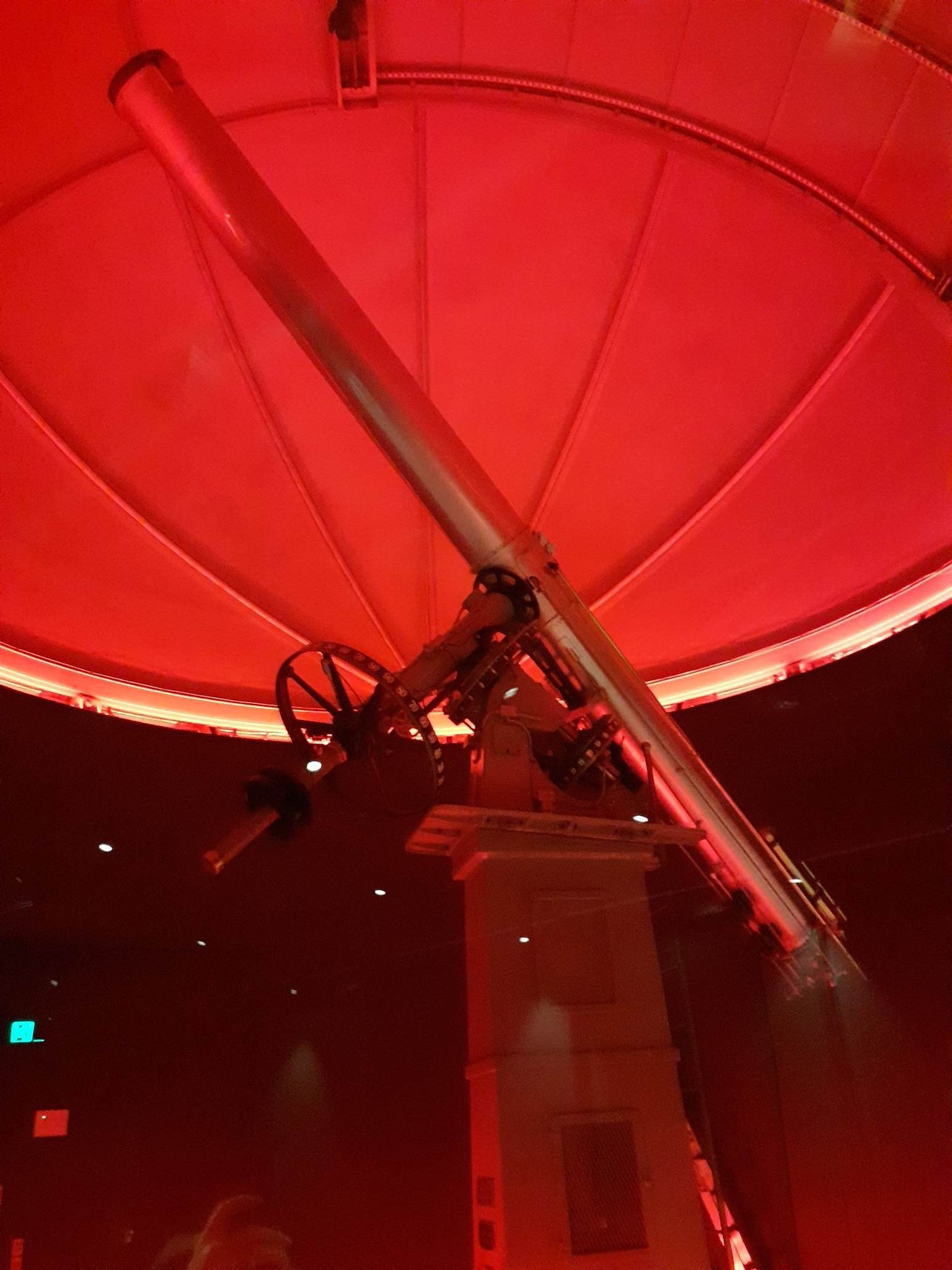
The Brashear telescope, built in 1894.

=== International Dark Sky Reserve ===
In June 2012, an area of 430,000 hectares (1,100,000 acres) around Tekapo was declared the Aoraki Mackenzie International Dark Sky Reserve by the International Dark-Sky Association. At the time of the designation in 2012, the reserve was the largest in the world, and the only reserve of its type in the Southern Hemisphere.

==== Mount John University Observatory ====
Selected for its very clear atmosphere, large number of clear sky nights, and relative freedom from light pollution, Mount John University Observatory is located on a small hill to the north of the town, and south of the small Lake Alexandrina. Originally set up by the University of Pennsylvania (looking for a southern hemisphere location), it is now operated by the University of Canterbury.

From 1969 to 1983, the United States Air Force had a satellite tracking station adjacent to the observatory.

==== Star gazing tours ====
The Dark-Sky Project runs star gazing tours from their award winning observatory building on the foreshore of Lake Tekapo. The Dark Sky Project is jointly owned by founders Hide Ozawa and Graeme Murray, and Ngāi Tahu iwi. In the New Zealand Tourism Awards 2021, Dark-Sky Project won the Māori Tourism award, He Kai Kei Aku Ringa.

The observatory building contains a restored Brashear telescope. It is built of brass, iron, steel and wood and stands nine metres high. It has an 18-inch refracting lens. The Brashear telescope was built in 1894. This telescope was brought to New Zealand in 1963 by the University of Pennsylvania and the University of Canterbury.

=== Church of the Good Shepherd ===
The Church of the Good Shepherd is situated within the township on the shores of Lake Tekapo. It was built in 1935, and was the first church in the Mackenzie Basin. The church was designed by Christchurch architect R.S.D. Harman, based on sketches by a local artist, Esther Hope. The building is a Category 1 listed historic place and is one of the most photographed churches in New Zealand. It features an altar window that frames views of the lake and mountains.

=== Sheepdog statue ===
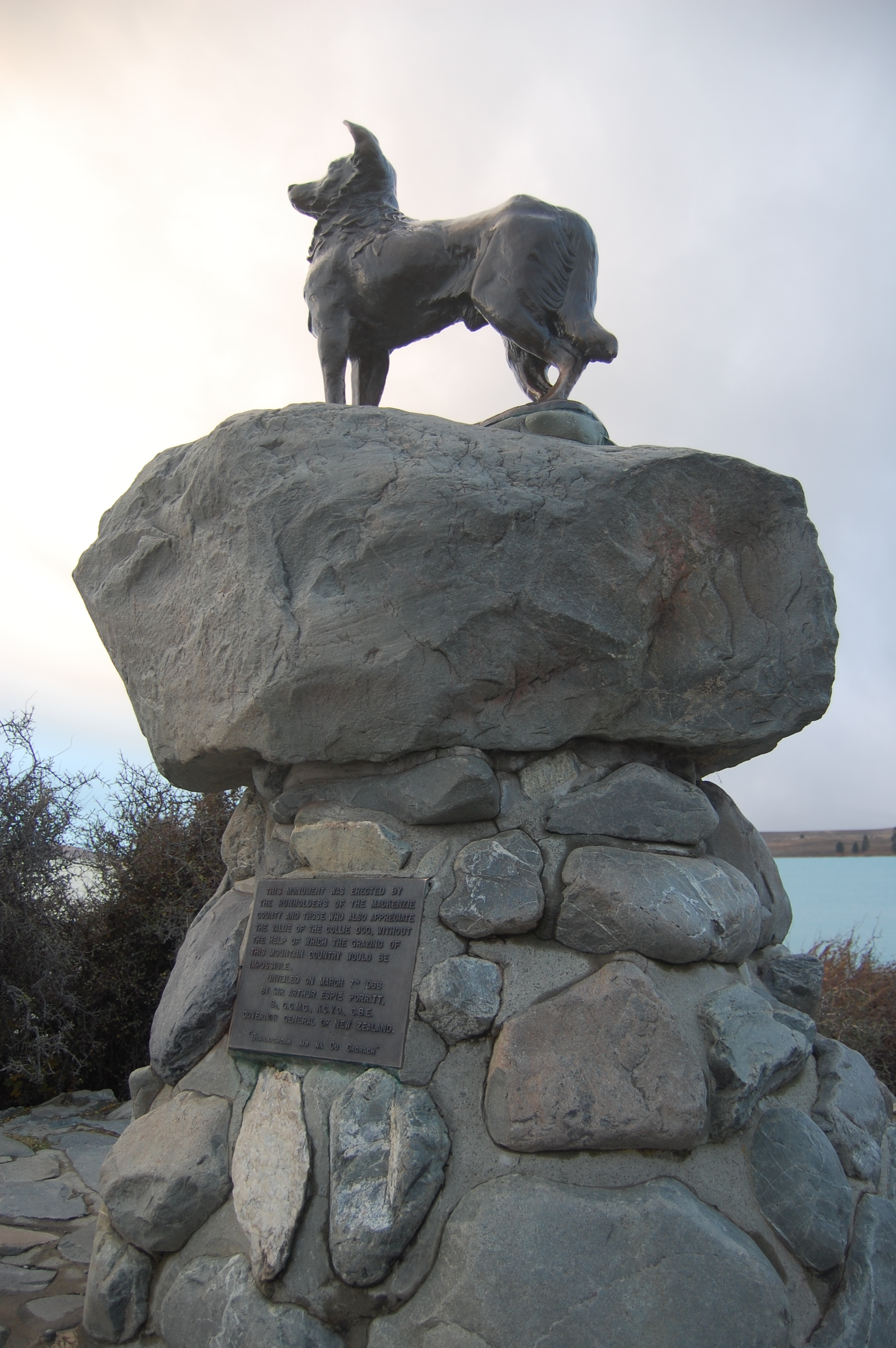
Dog statue with plaque

Close to the Church of the Good Shepherd is a well-known bronze statue of a New Zealand Collie sheepdog. The statue was commissioned by Mackenzie Country residents in recognition of the indispensable role of the sheepdog in their livelihoods. The sculptor was Innes Elliott of Kaikōura, with a dog called Haig, belonging to a neighbour, being the model. Elliott reported the sculpting process took approximately fifteen months. Clay for the model came from the insulator works in Temuka, with a plaster cast of it made and sent to London in 1966, where the statue was cast.

=== Tekapo Hot Springs ===
Tekapo Hot Springs is a tourist attraction located to the north-west of the township, at the base of Mount John. It has three hot pools designed for soaking in, which range in temperature from 36.5 to 38.5 degrees Celsius. These are designed in the shape of Lake Ōhau, Lake Pukaki and Lake Tekapo. A further two cooler pools are designed for children and a splash pad is also present. Tekapo Hot Springs also has an ice skating rink and a snow tubing park.

=== Lake Tekapo foot bridge ===
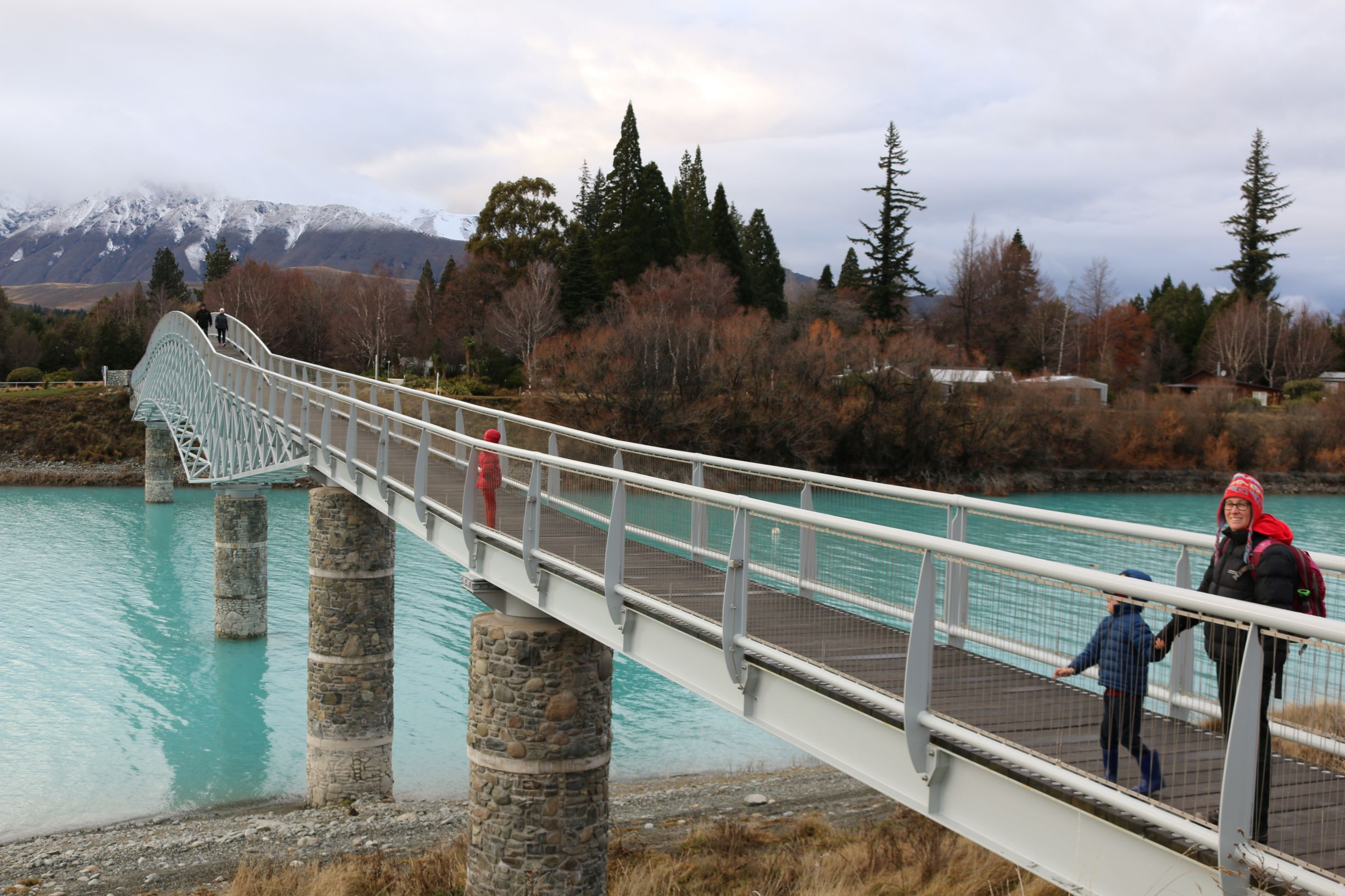
Lake Tekapo footbridge (July 2020)

The 125-metre bridge was opened in 2015. This crosses the Tekapo River and connects the Church of the Good Shepherd with the rest of the Lake Tekapo township.

=== Lake Tekapo Regional Park ===
Lake Tekapo Regional Park is a recreation area of 165 hectares (410 acres) located to the east of the township. The park includes picnic areas, an enclosed dog exercise park and 24 kilometres (15 mi) of cycling and walking tracks. Access to the park is by foot or bicycle from the Lake Tekapo township or by car from Lilybank Road.

=== Skiing ===
The Roundhill Ski Area is located on the Two Thumb Range overlooking Lake Tekapo. It is approximately 32 kilometres (20 mi) from Lake Tekapo Village. Roundhill's base is at 1350 metres above sea level and the highest point the lifts rise to is 2,133 m (6,998 ft) above sea level. It comprises 550 hectares (1,400 acres) of terrain.

== Military base ==
The New Zealand Army has a small training base located 6 km (3.7 mi) to the west of the Tekapo township. It is used for general military exercises and was used for pre-deployment training of forces being sent to Afghanistan.

In 1968, a major fire at the military base during winter led to several buildings being burnt to the ground.

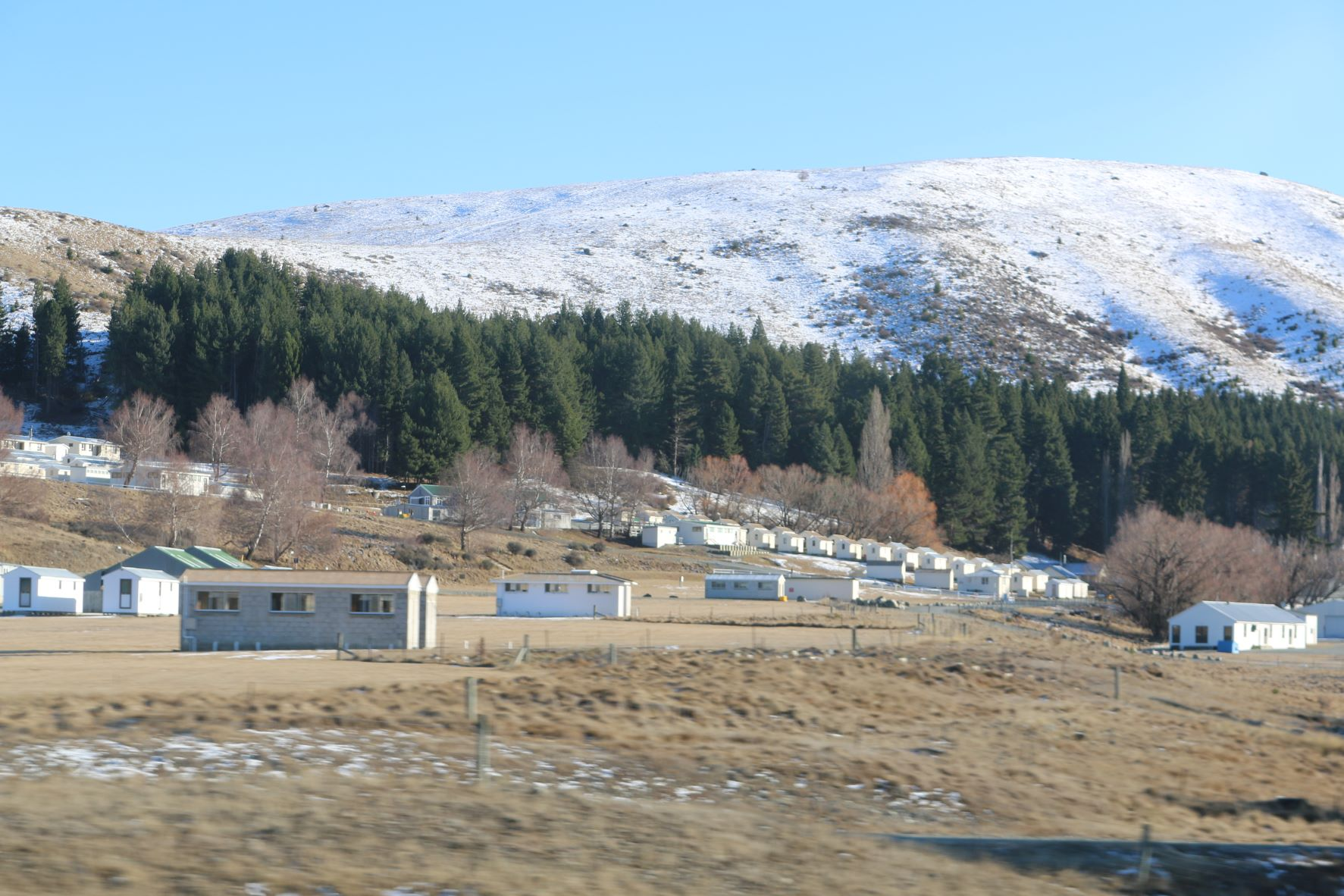
Tekapo Military Base (2021)

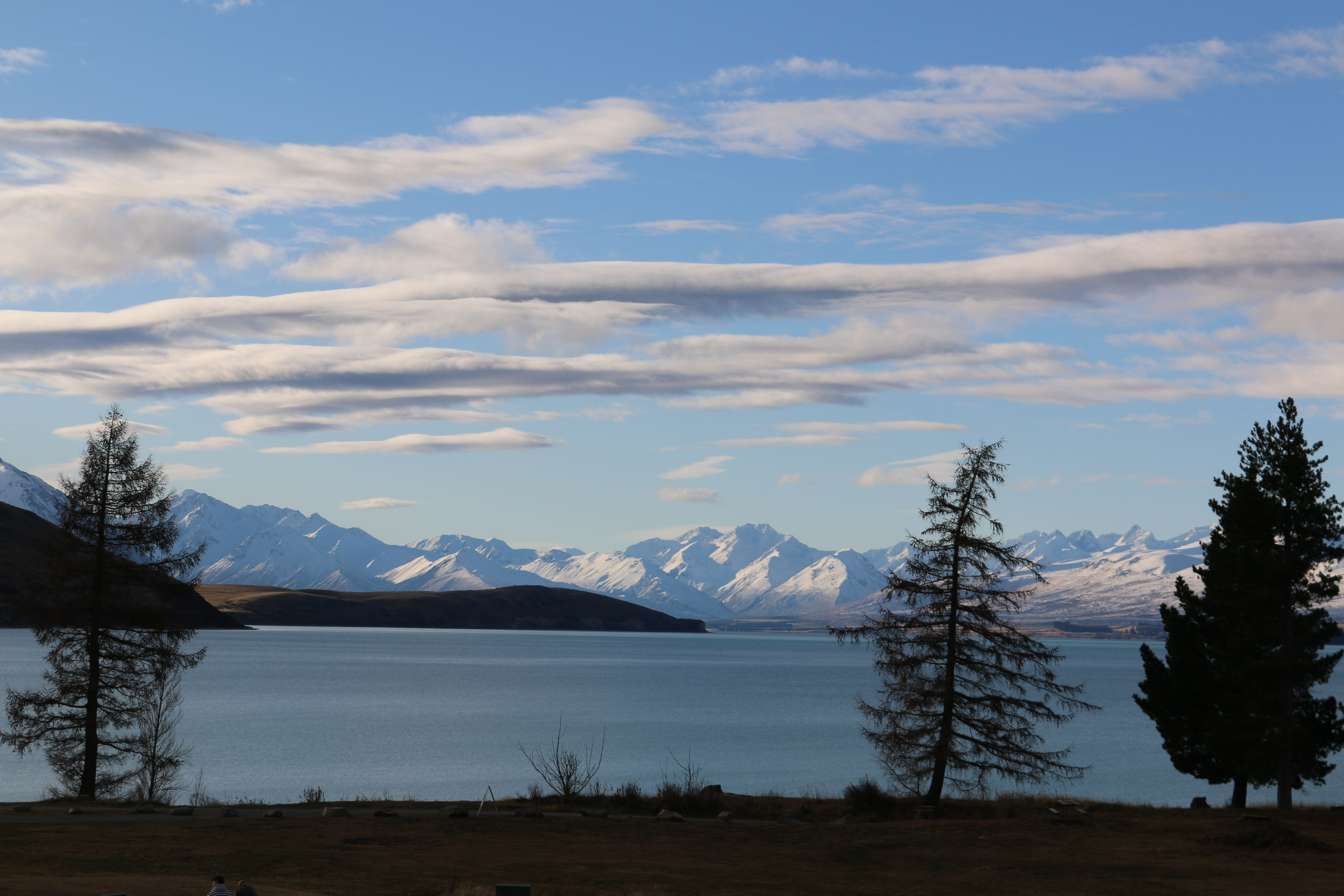
Lake Tekapo, viewed from the township, looking down the lake to Mount Ross.

The base encompasses approximately 1,700 ha (4,200 acres) of terrain which sits approximately 1,000 m (3,300 ft) above sea level. It continues to be an important training site for the New Zealand Army for initial field training and battle handling exercises.

In 2016, the New Zealand Government announced that $16 million was going to be spent upgrading the military base. Improvements would include accommodation upgrades, communications, security fencing, extensions to heavy and light vehicle tracks and a new main camp gate.

An unformed road that runs alongside the Tekapo Military base was sold by the Mackenzie District Council to the New Zealand Defence Force in 2021 for $1 in order to address safety concerns of the public getting too close to military training activities such as live firing of weapons.

== Government ==
Tekapo is part of the Waitaki electorate. The MacKenzie District Council is responsible for providing local government services to Lake Tekapo.

== Education ==
Lake Tekapo School is a contributing primary school serving years 1 to 6, with a roll of 36 students as of July 2026. The school opened in 1940.
