= Mount Cook Aerodrome =

Mount Cook Airport
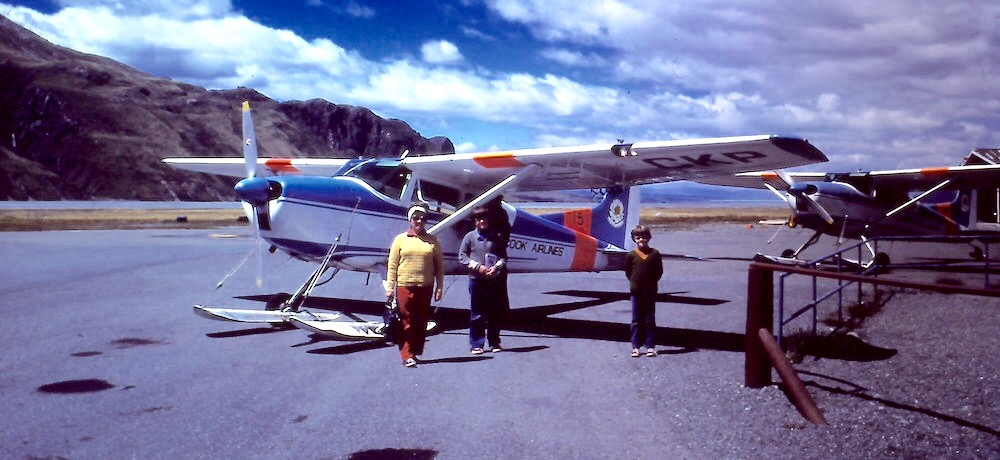
- Ski-planes at Mount Cook, 1977
- IATA: MON; ICAO: NZMC

Summary
- Operator: Aoraki Mount Cook Airport Limited
- Location: Mount Cook Village, New Zealand
- Elevation AMSL: 2,153 ft / 656 m
- Coordinates: 43°46′0.6″S 170°8′8.95″E

Map
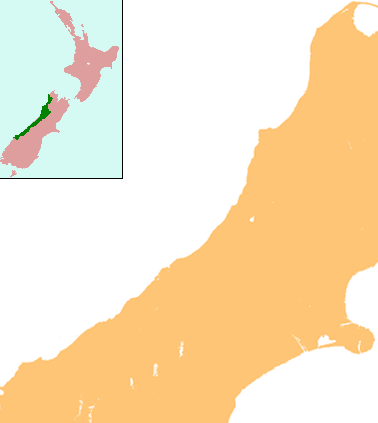

Runways
Direction	Length		Surface
Direction	ft	m	Surface
13/31	4,833	1,473	Paved

Mount Cook Aerodrome (IATA: MON, ICAO: NZMC) is an airport near Mount Cook Village, New Zealand. Mount Cook Tourist Company built a small airfield at Birch Hill Flat, which opened on 3 May 1936. Mount Cook Airline began scheduled passenger flights to the area in 1961.

The terminal was destroyed by fire in June 2000, and was subsequently rebuilt. Regular commercial flights originally ceased in 2002, however from 23 December 2012 to 27 January 2013, Air New Zealand subsidiary Mount Cook Airline operated thrice weekly services from Mount Cook to Christchurch and Queenstown. Air New Zealand decided not to resume the services for the 2013/2014 summer due to a lack of demand. In December 2019, Mount Cook Airline was merged into Air New Zealand and ceased operations.

== Climate ==
Climate data for Mt Cook Airport, elevation 656 m (2,152 ft), (2012-2024 normals, extremes 2012-present)
Month	Jan	Feb	Mar	Apr	May	Jun	Jul	Aug	Sep	Oct	Nov	Dec	Year
Record high °C (°F)	33.5 (92.3)	30.5 (86.9)	27.2 (81.0)	23.7 (74.7)	20.3 (68.5)	17.9 (64.2)	16 (61)	17.7 (63.9)	22.3 (72.1)	26.1 (79.0)	28.5 (83.3)	29.3 (84.7)	33.5 (92.3)
Mean maximum °C (°F)	29.2 (84.6)	28 (82)	25.6 (78.1)	22.2 (72.0)	18.9 (66.0)	14.9 (58.8)	14.3 (57.7)	15.3 (59.5)	18.9 (66.0)	22.7 (72.9)	24.8 (76.6)	27 (81)	30.2 (86.4)
Mean daily maximum °C (°F)	22 (72)	21.7 (71.1)	19.3 (66.7)	15.1 (59.2)	11.9 (53.4)	8.3 (46.9)	7.9 (46.2)	9.6 (49.3)	12.2 (54.0)	14.9 (58.8)	17.1 (62.8)	19.8 (67.6)	15.0 (59.0)
Daily mean °C (°F)	15.5 (59.9)	15.2 (59.4)	12.9 (55.2)	9.5 (49.1)	6.5 (43.7)	3.2 (37.8)	2.8 (37.0)	4.3 (39.7)	6.6 (43.9)	9.2 (48.6)	11.3 (52.3)	13.9 (57.0)	9.2 (48.6)
Mean daily minimum °C (°F)	9.1 (48.4)	8.7 (47.7)	6.6 (43.9)	3.9 (39.0)	1.2 (34.2)	−1.8 (28.8)	−2.4 (27.7)	−0.9 (30.4)	1 (34)	3.5 (38.3)	5.6 (42.1)	8.1 (46.6)	3.6 (38.4)
Mean minimum °C (°F)	1.2 (34.2)	1.8 (35.2)	0 (32)	−2.6 (27.3)	−6 (21)	−8.7 (16.3)	−9.8 (14.4)	−8.6 (16.5)	−6.9 (19.6)	−4.4 (24.1)	−1.5 (29.3)	0.8 (33.4)	−11.6 (11.1)
Record low °C (°F)	−1.9 (28.6)	−0.2 (31.6)	−2 (28)	−4.5 (23.9)	−8.8 (16.2)	−15 (5)	−13.7 (7.3)	−14.1 (6.6)	−9.6 (14.7)	−7.5 (18.5)	−3.7 (25.3)	−1.7 (28.9)	−15 (5)
Average rainfall mm (inches)	235.7 (9.28)	136.8 (5.39)	152.6 (6.01)	191.8 (7.55)	233.7 (9.20)	227.5 (8.96)	235 (9.3)	191.1 (7.52)	224.7 (8.85)	223.8 (8.81)	190.3 (7.49)	197.1 (7.76)	2,440.1 (96.12)
Source: NIWA

== Sources ==
- New Zealand AIP (PDF)
- Air New Zealand
- Timaru Herald article on 2013 closure of Mount Cook route
- Air New Zealand press release on 2012/13 Mount Cook routes
