= Ashburton Aviation Museum =

Aviation museum in Ashburton, New Zealand

- Ashburton Aviation Museum logo

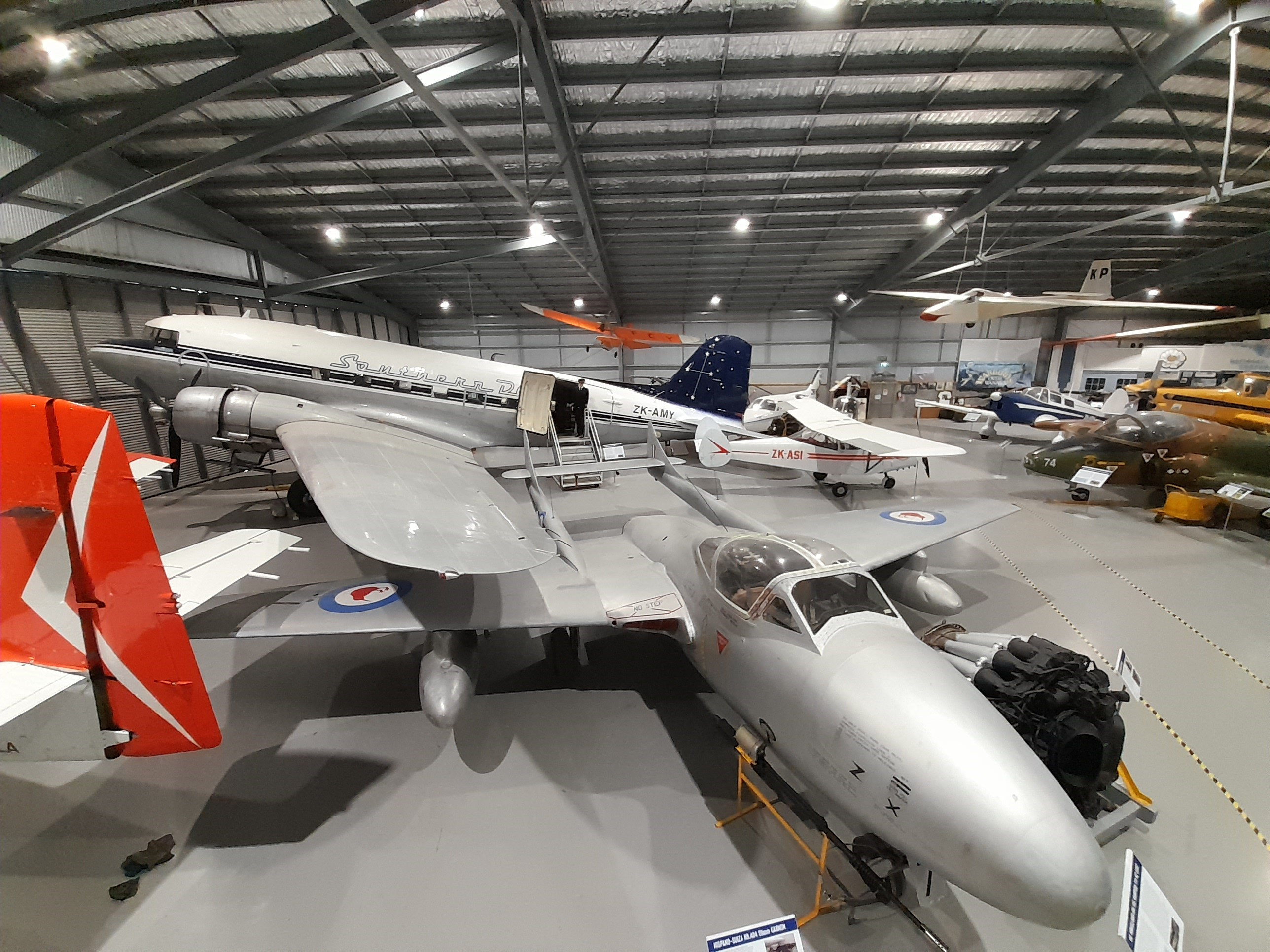
- Coordinates: 43°54′17″S 171°48′20″E
- Collections: Military and civilian aircraft
- Owner: Ashburton Aviation Museum Society Trust
- Website: aviationmuseum.co.nz

The Ashburton Aviation Museum is located at Ashburton Aerodrome, a small airport 3.7 km (2.3 mi) to the east of Ashburton in the South Island of New Zealand. There are two buildings housing a collection of around 40 aircraft. The museum is owned by the Ashburton Aviation Museum Society Trust.

Ashburton has a significant aviation history because the town was used as a training base for the Royal New Zealand Air Force (RNZAF) during World War II, with 50 Tiger Moths based at the airfield.

== Governance ==
The first meeting to establish the Ashburton Aviation Museum Society was held in 1974. The Ashburton Aviation Museum Society was incorporated in June 1986, and registered as a charity in New Zealand in 2008. In February 2016, the organisational model was changed and the Ashburton Aviation Museum Society Trust was registered as a Charitable Trust.

== Collection ==
The first aircraft obtained for the collection was a former RNZAF training Harvard purchased in 1978. The aircraft was initially stored in a farm shed while volunteers raised funds and worked on the construction of a hangar on a site at the Ashburton airfield. The hangar was opened in April 1991. While the museum has many military aircraft in its collection, it also presents a history of civil aviation in the Canterbury Region.

The collection includes the only British Aerospace Hawker Siddeley Harrier GR3 "Jump-jet" in the Southern Hemisphere, and a former RNZAF Douglas Skyhawk. This aircraft is on loan and as of 2024 was owned by the US Airforce. It was the only aircraft in the collection not owned by the museum.

Another aircraft in the collection is a de Havilland Vampire that recorded only a few flying hours with the RNZAF. It was recovered from a children's playground at the Cave Tavern and was restored over several years. The museum is also home to the Southern DC3 Trust's historic Douglas DC-3 airliner ZK-AMY, retired in 2014. The museum collection also includes many model aircraft.

The museum had 4500 adults and 3300 children visit during the year April 2022 to March 2023.

== Awards ==
In 2022, at the ANZ Business of the Year Awards for Ashburton District Council, the museum won the Excellence in Tourism award, and received a Highly Commended award in the Excellence in Not-for Profit category.

== Gallery ==
Exhibits

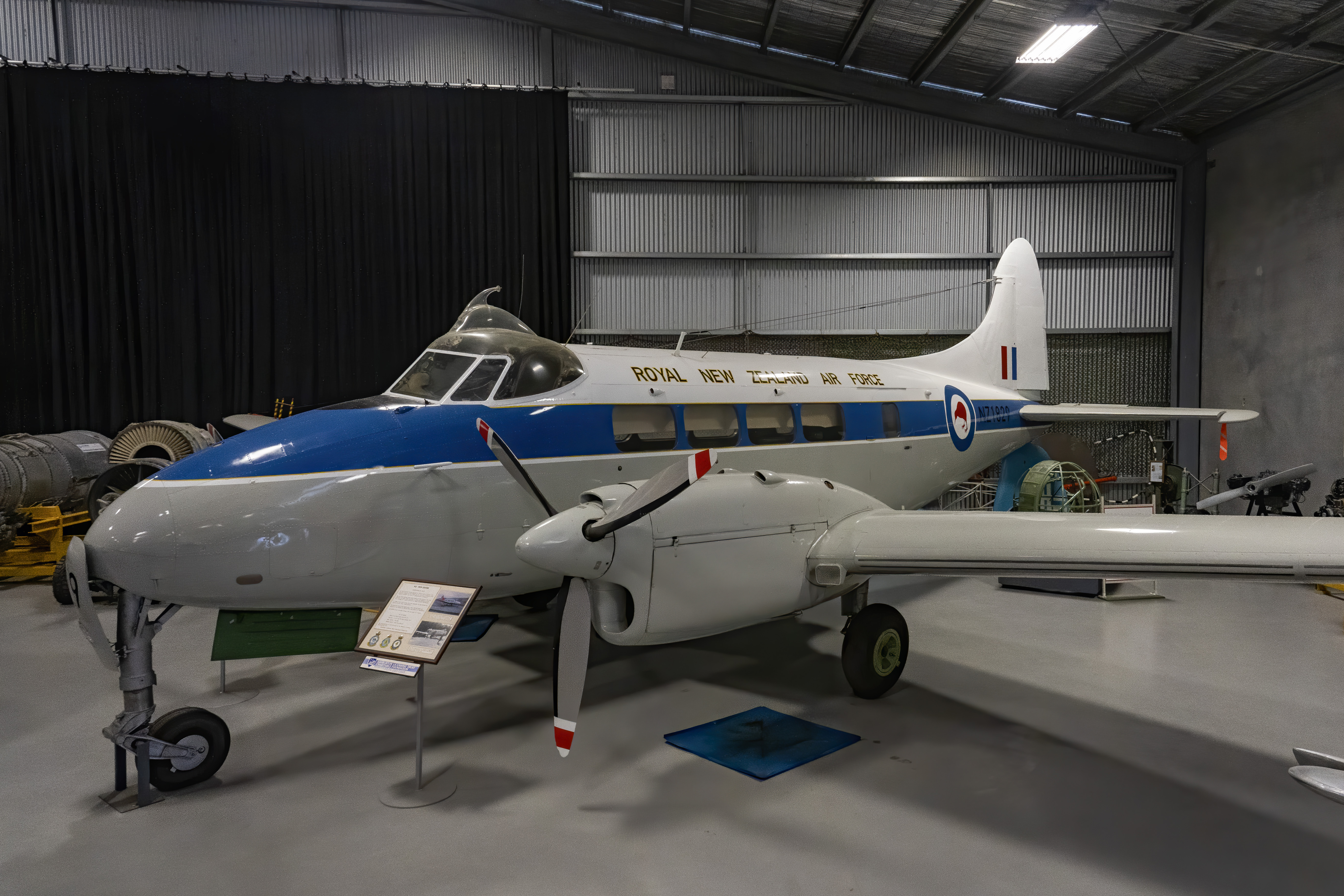
de Havilland DH.104 Devon

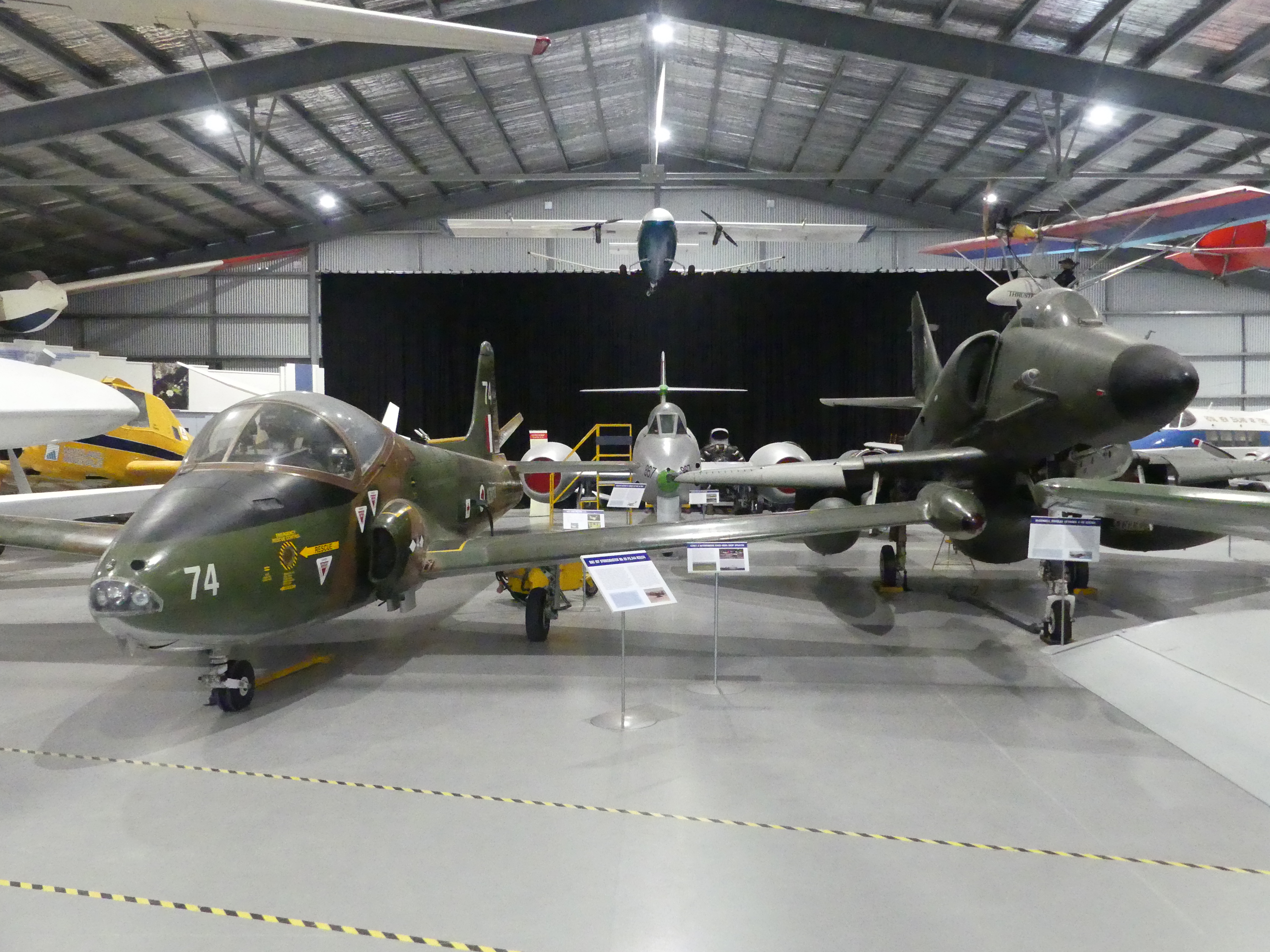
Ashburton Aviation Museum

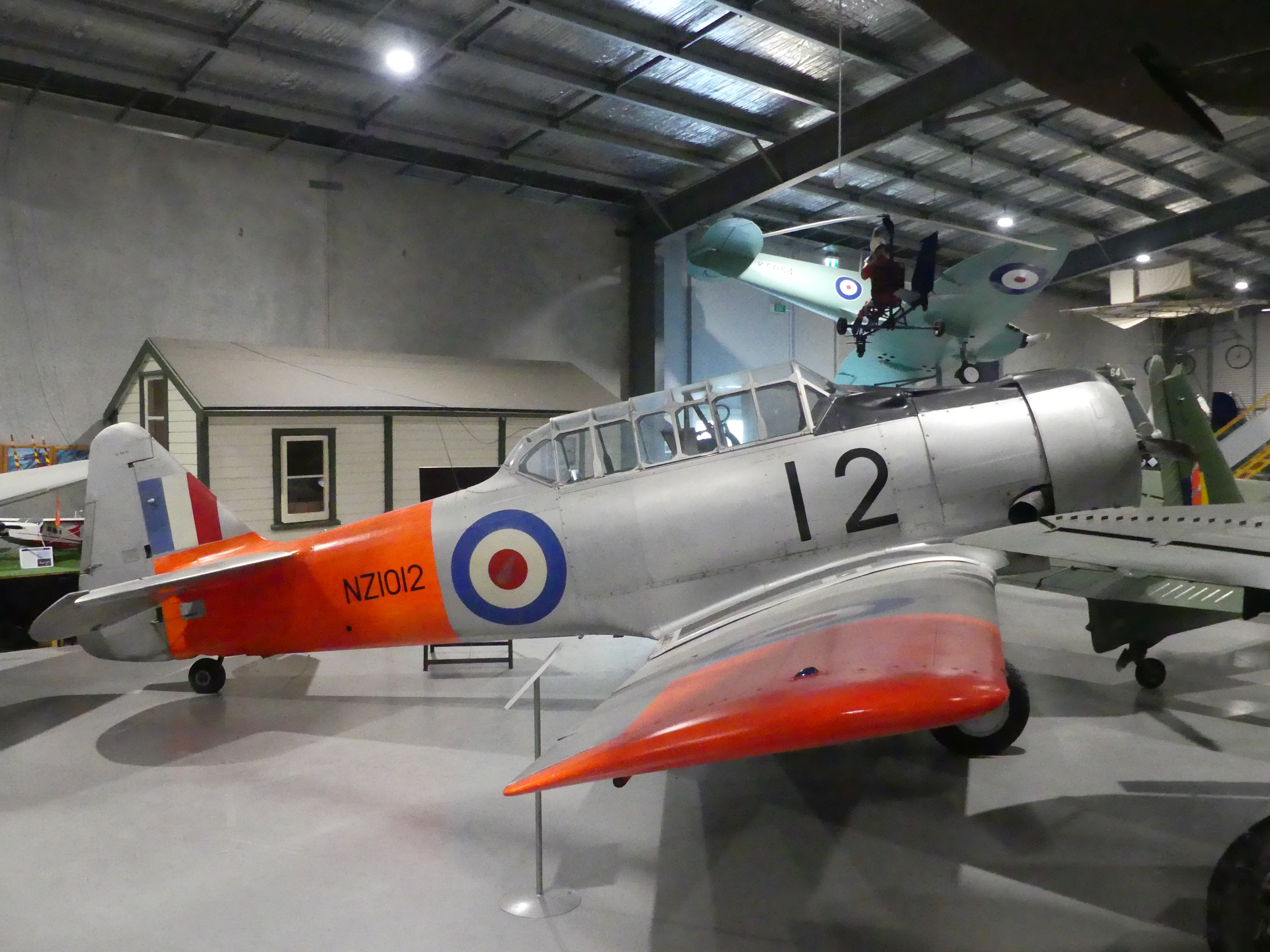
North American AT6D Harvard MK2A - NZ1012

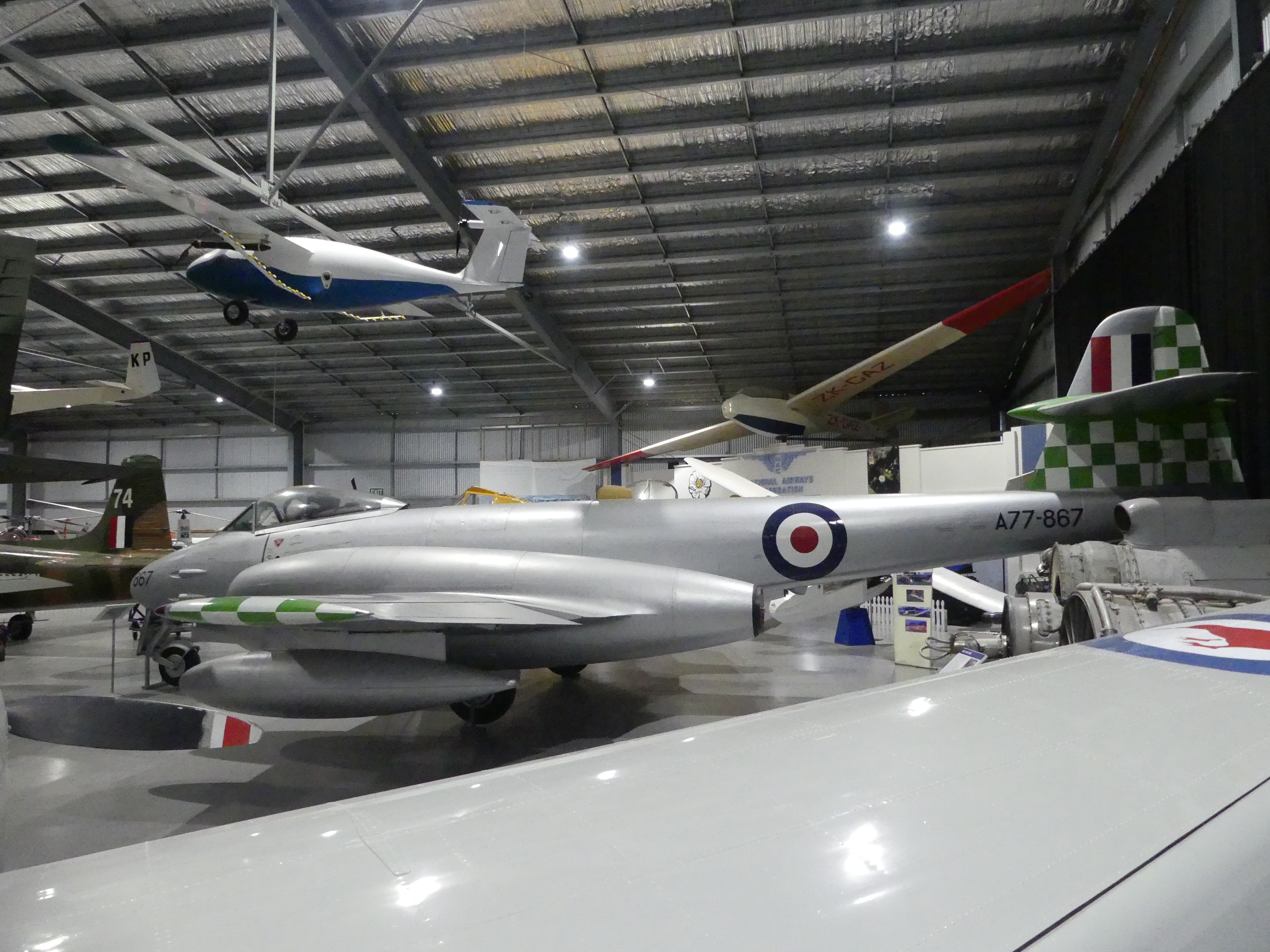
Gloster Meteor F.3 - NZ 6001

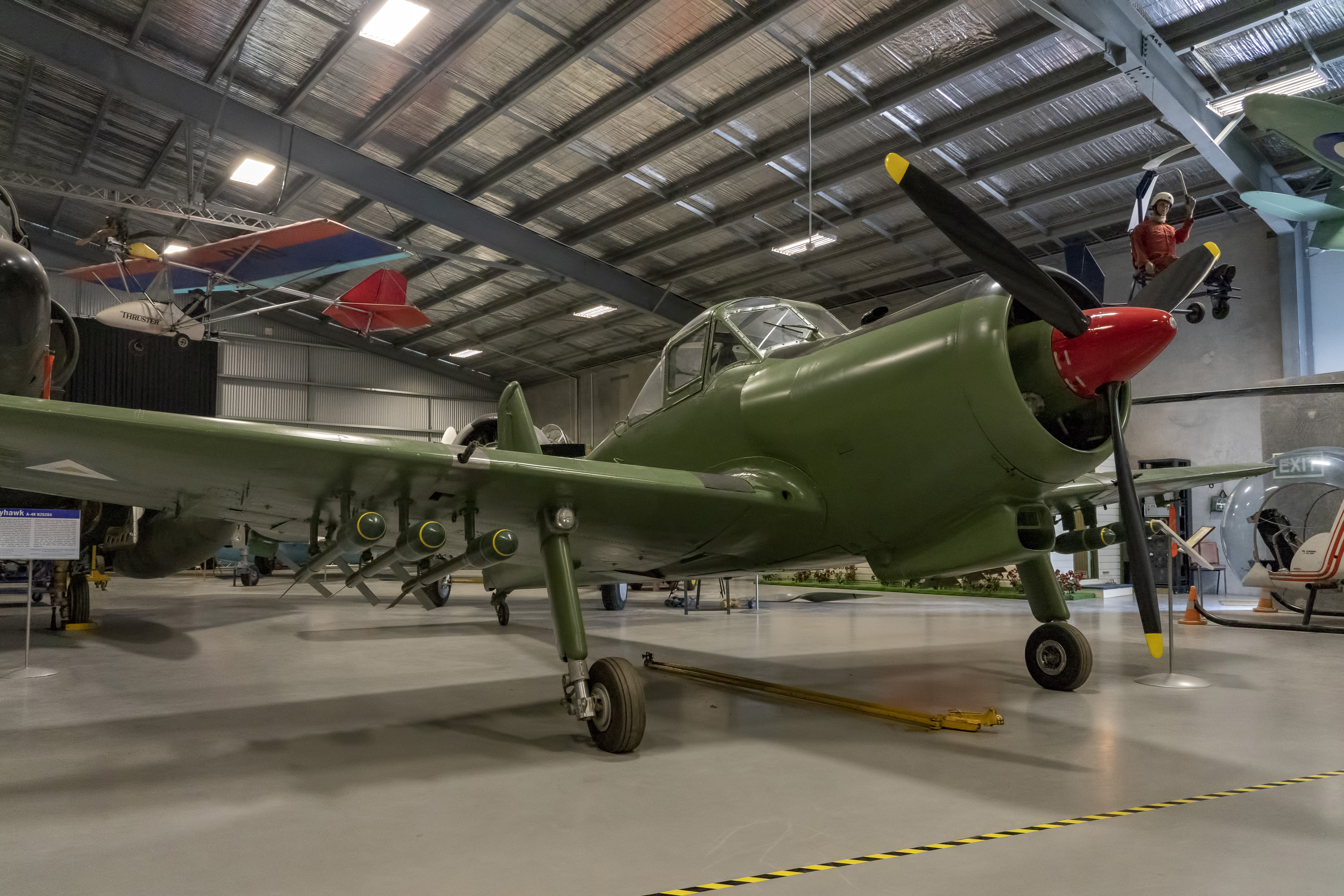
Percival Provost P56
