= Originair =

Airline of New Zealand

| IATA | ICAO | Call sign |
|---|---|---|
| OG | OGN | ORIGIN |
- Founded: March 2015
- Commenced operations: 12 August 2015
- Operating bases: Nelson Airport
- Frequent-flyer program: Originair Rewards
- Fleet size: 3
- Destinations: 6
- Headquarters: Nelson, New Zealand
- Key people: Robert Inglis (Managing Director)
- Website: originair.co.nz

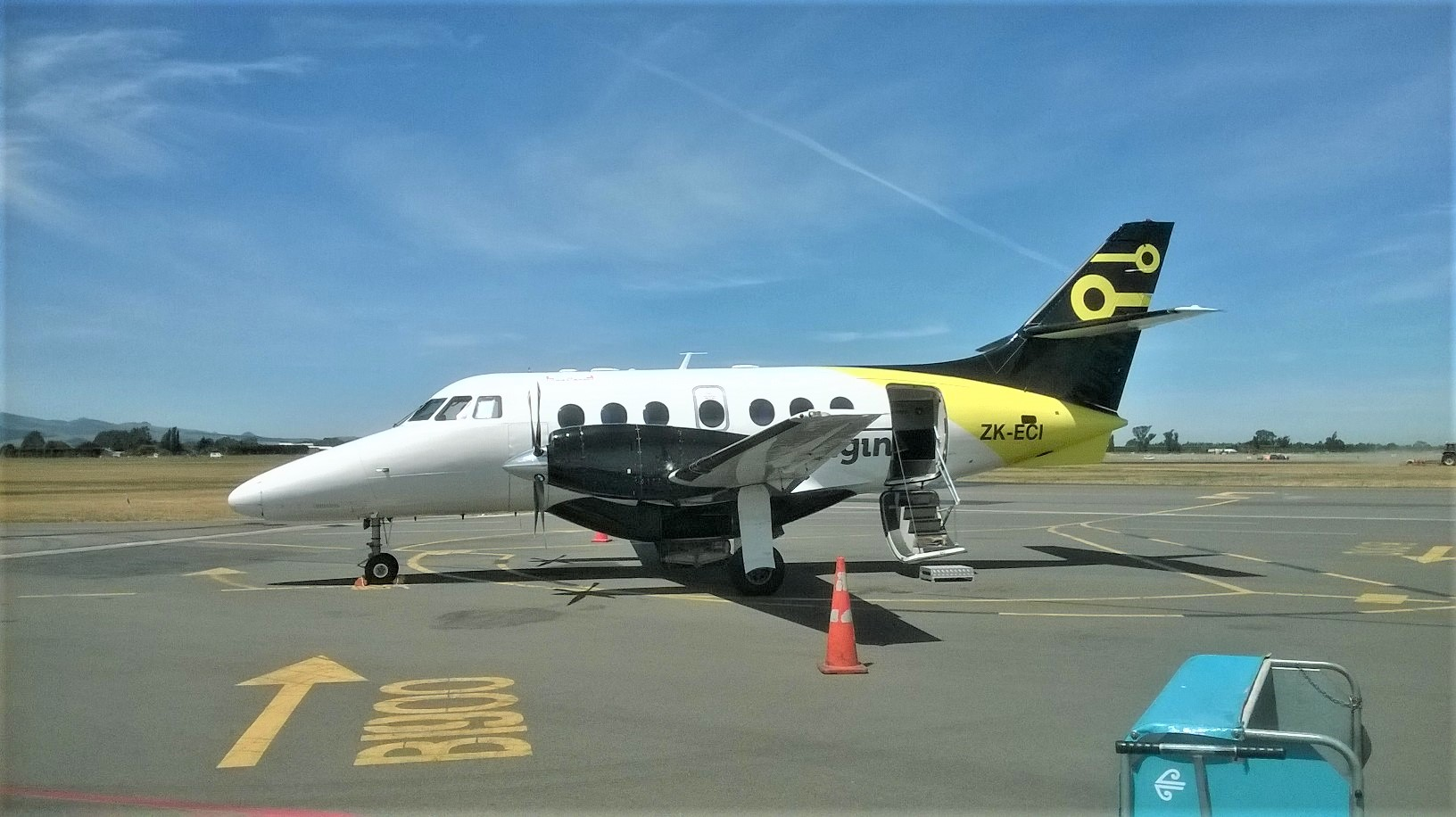
Originair Jetstream at Christchurch Airport, December 2015

Originair is an airline based in Nelson, New Zealand, that operates domestic flights in New Zealand. It was founded in 2015 by Nelson businessman Robert Inglis, who had previously founded Air Nelson and Origin Pacific Airways. Originair commenced operations on 12 August 2015 with flights between Nelson and Palmerston North; it started flights between Nelson and Wellington the following month. It began with one British Aerospace Jetstream 31 aircraft, and now operates a fleet of three aircraft, following the addition of two Jetstream 32 aircraft.

== History ==
=== Background ===
Nelson businessman Robert Inglis founded Air Nelson in 1979 with Nicki Smith. Air New Zealand purchased 50 per cent of the airline in October 1988, and the remaining share in 1996. Air Nelson operated as one of Air New Zealand's regional subsidiaries, operating turboprop aircraft on domestic routes under the Air New Zealand Link brand, until Air New Zealand merged Air Nelson and Mount Cook Airlines into its mainline fleet in 2019. Inglis and Smith founded Origin Pacific Airways in 1996, to provide regional flights around New Zealand. It had a code-share agreement with Qantas' New Zealand subsidiary Jetconnect between 2001 and 2004, allowing Origin Pacific's regional flights to connect with the larger airline's domestic and international routes. The termination of the code-share agreement resulted in Origin Pacific Airways losing 60% of its business, and it went into liquidation in 2006.

=== Operation ===
In 2015, Inglis founded Originair in response to Air New Zealand's termination of direct flights between Nelson and Palmerston North. Flight operations were contracted out to Air Freight NZ although the aircraft were painted in Originair's livery. The airline commenced operations on 12 August 2015 when flights between Nelson and Palmerston North began. Flights between Nelson and Wellington began the following month on 13 September 2015.

In February 2016, issues with Air Freight NZ's operating certificate led to the grounding of the Jetstream aircraft by New Zealand's Civil Aviation Authority (CAA). The issues were stated to be "very specific to the particular operation" of Originair. Originair briefly contracted another company, Airwork, to operate its flights using Metroliner aircraft, although when this arrangement terminated at the end of March 2016, Originair temporarily ceased operations.

In July 2016 the airline announced it had resolved most of its CAA issues and would resume flights in September 2016 under the operation and Air Operating Certificate of Inflite Charters. It was announced that flights would resume between Nelson and Palmerston North, which had lacked a direct flight while Originair's operations were suspended, but flights between Nelson and Wellington would not resume because the introduction of Jetstar had made the route too competitive.

On 23 September 2016, Originair recommenced regular scheduled services between Nelson and Palmerston North, with flights being operated by air2there using Cessna Grand Caravans and Piper Chieftains. Flights with Originair's own aircraft resumed in June 2017. Originair added a new route from Nelson to New Plymouth on 29 September 2017. Hawke's Bay Airport at Napier was added to their network from 28 September 2018. Flights to Wellington resumed on 14 February 2020.

Flights to Napier resumed on 17 September 2021 and expanded services linked the city to Hamilton and Palmerston North for the first time.

Hamilton flights came to an end on 26 September 2025, because of soaring costs for the airline. In October, Originair reconnected Blenheim with Christchurch as well as connecting Blenheim with Palmerston North for the first time in 20 years.

In February 2026, Originair announced that they were launching flights between Nelson and Christchurch operating twice weekly on Fridays and Sundays, the first flight took place on 13 February 2026. This route is suspended as of August 2026 due to the ongoing fuel crisis.

== Destinations ==
Originair operates scheduled services to the following destinations within New Zealand:

| Destination | Airport | Start | End | Status |
|---|---|---|---|---|
| Blenheim | Blenheim Airport | 19 October 2025 | | Current |
| Christchurch | Christchurch Airport | 19 October 2025 | | Current |
| Hamilton | Hamilton Airport | 19 October 2020 | 26 September 2025 | Past |
| Napier | Napier Airport | 28 September 2018; 17 September 2021 | 29 November 2019; 10 April 2023 | Past |
| Nelson | Nelson Airport | 12 August 2015 | | Current |
| New Plymouth | New Plymouth Airport | 29 September 2017 | 25 November 2019 | Past |
| Palmerston North | Palmerston North Airport | 12 August 2015 | | Current |
| Taupō | Taupō Airport | 17 February 2025 | 26 May 2025 | Past |
| Wellington | Wellington Airport | 13 September 2015; 14 February 2020 | 31 March 2016 | Current |
| Westport | Westport Airport | 3 January 2025; 24 May 2026 | 1 May 2026 | Current |

Originair also operates charter flights throughout New Zealand.

== Fleet ==
The Originair fleet consists of the following aircraft:

Originair fleet
| Aircraft | Total | Orders | Passengers (Economy) |
|---|---|---|---|
| British Aerospace Jetstream 32 | 3 | - | 18 |
| Total | 3 | 0 | |
