= List of busiest airports in New Zealand =

This is a list of the busiest airports in New Zealand by passenger numbers and aircraft movements. Passenger numbers are tabulated annually at the end of the financial year (30 June, for the majority of airports). The top 15 airports are shown.

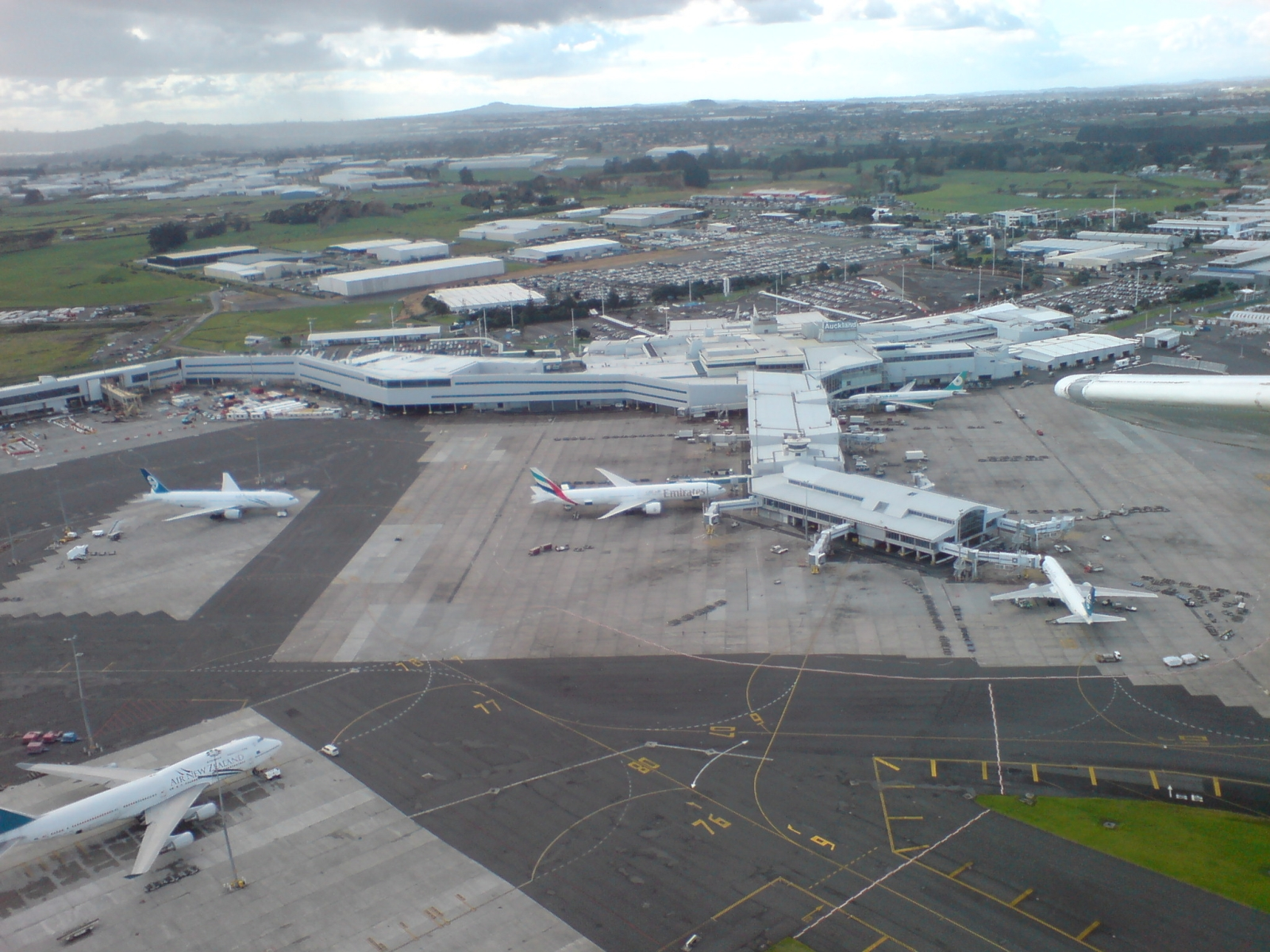
Auckland Airport

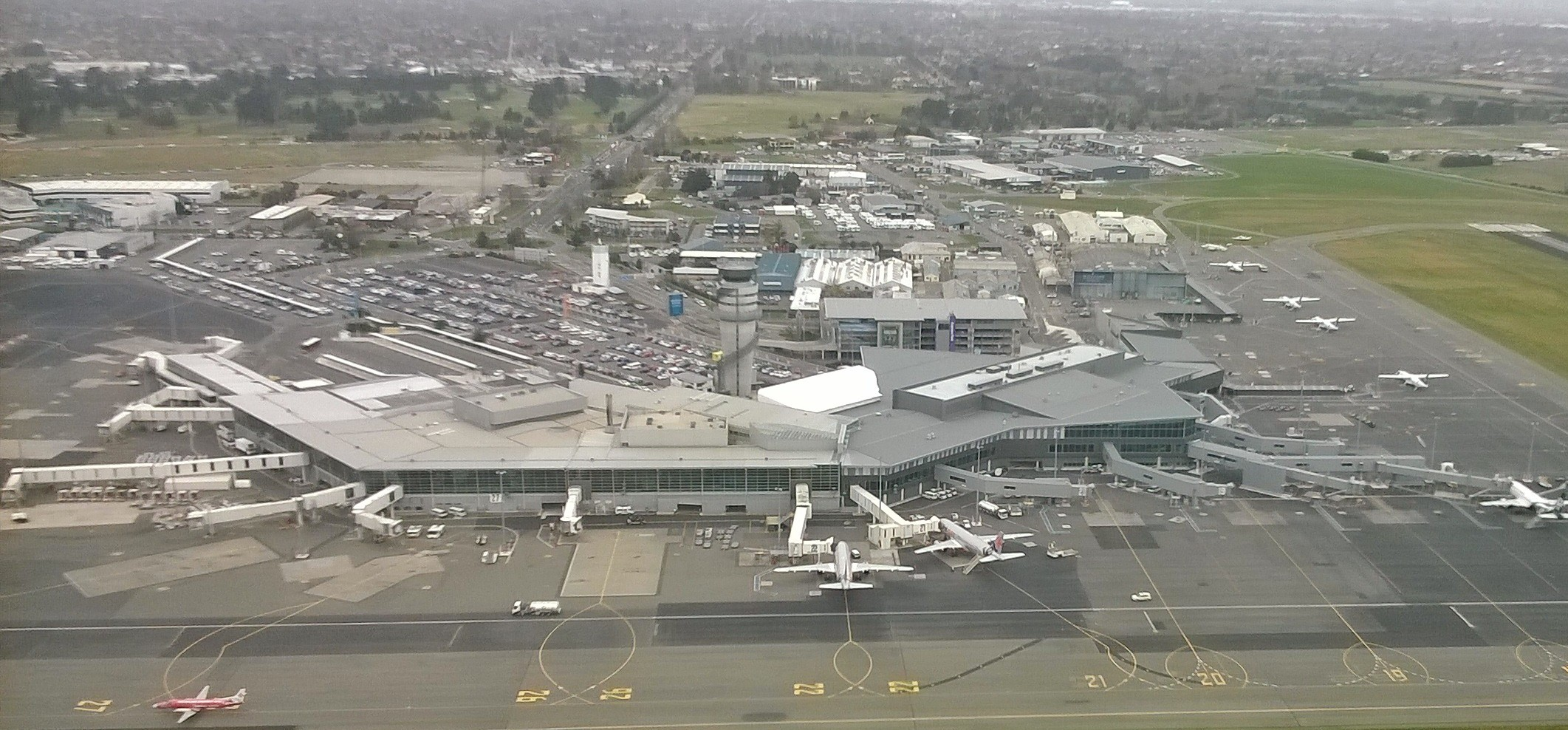
Christchurch Airport

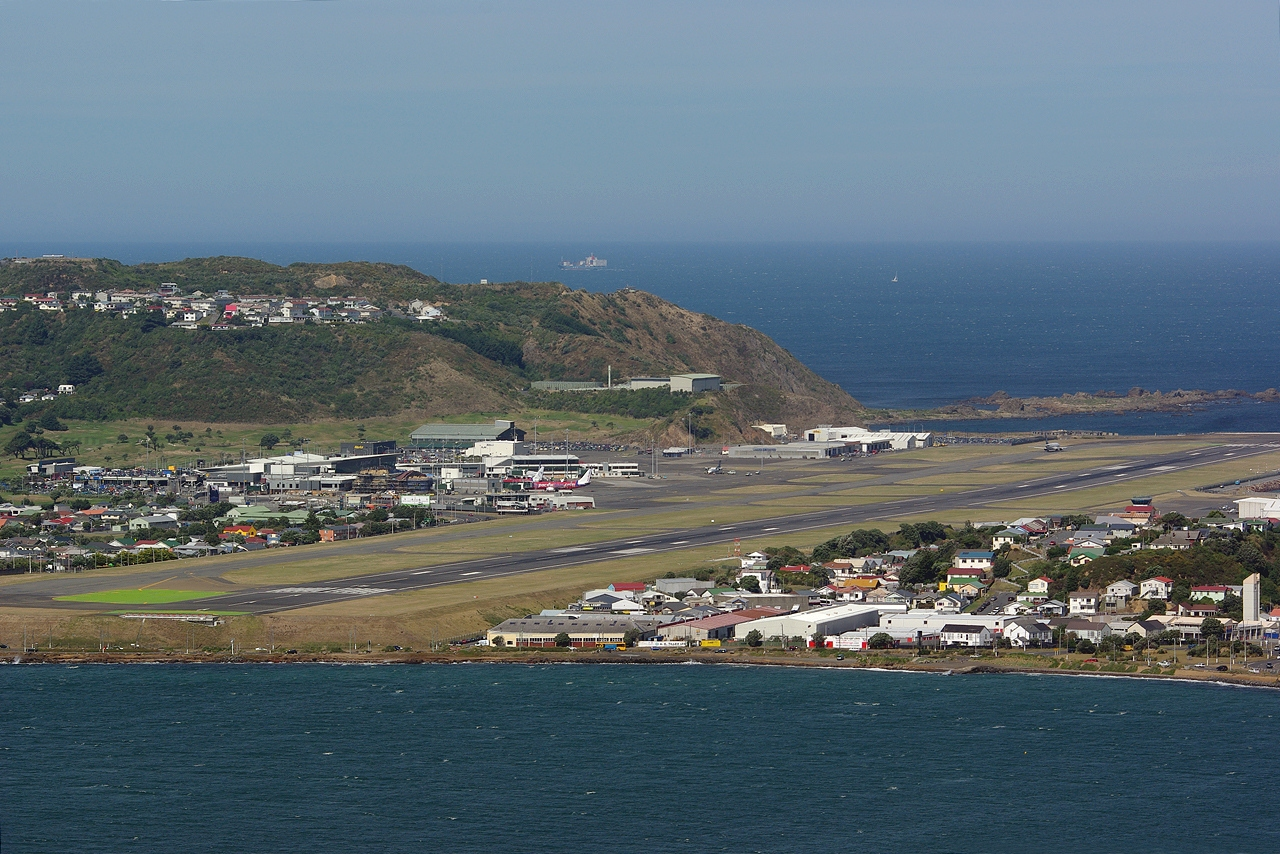
Wellington Airport

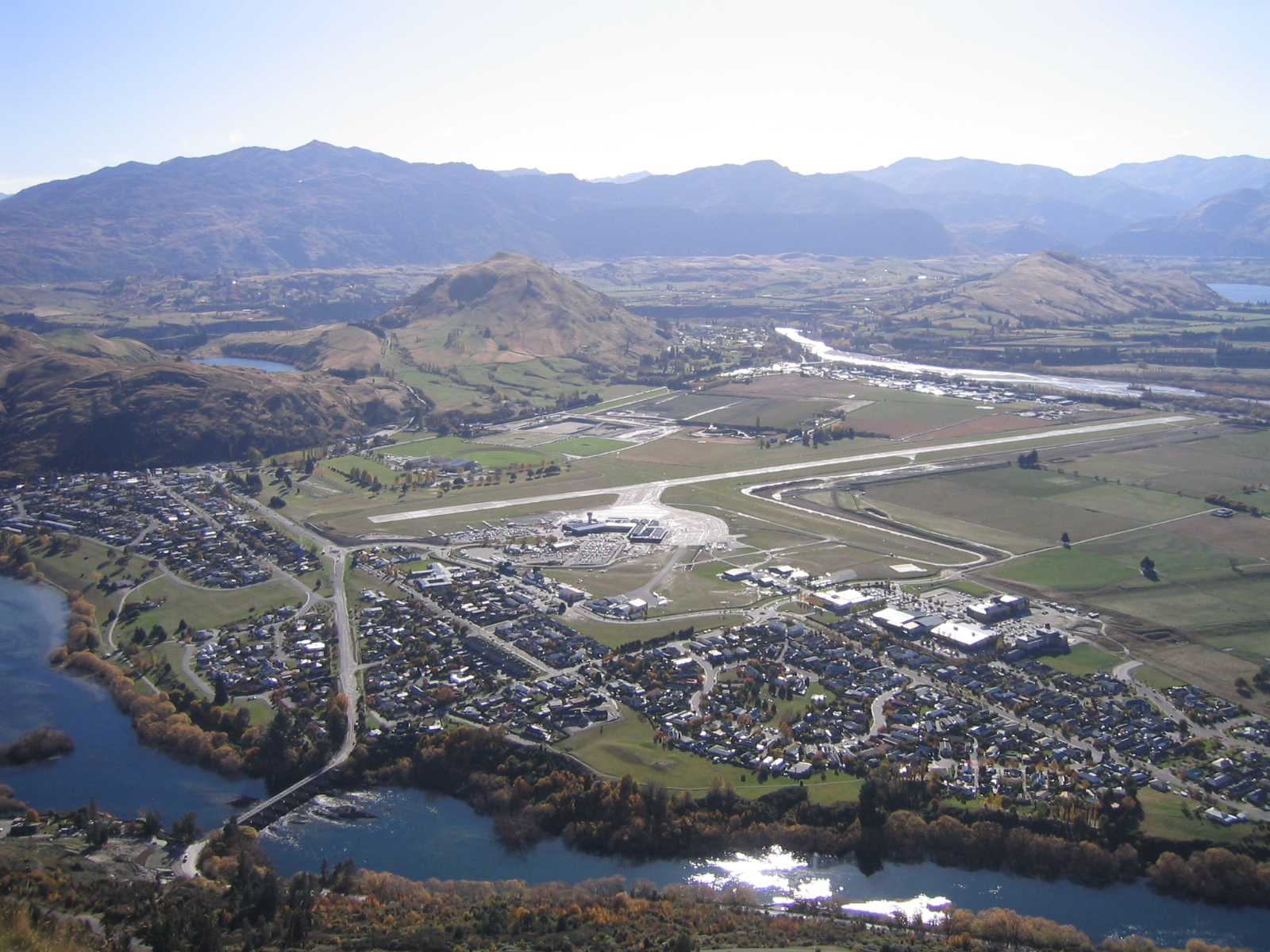
Queenstown Airport

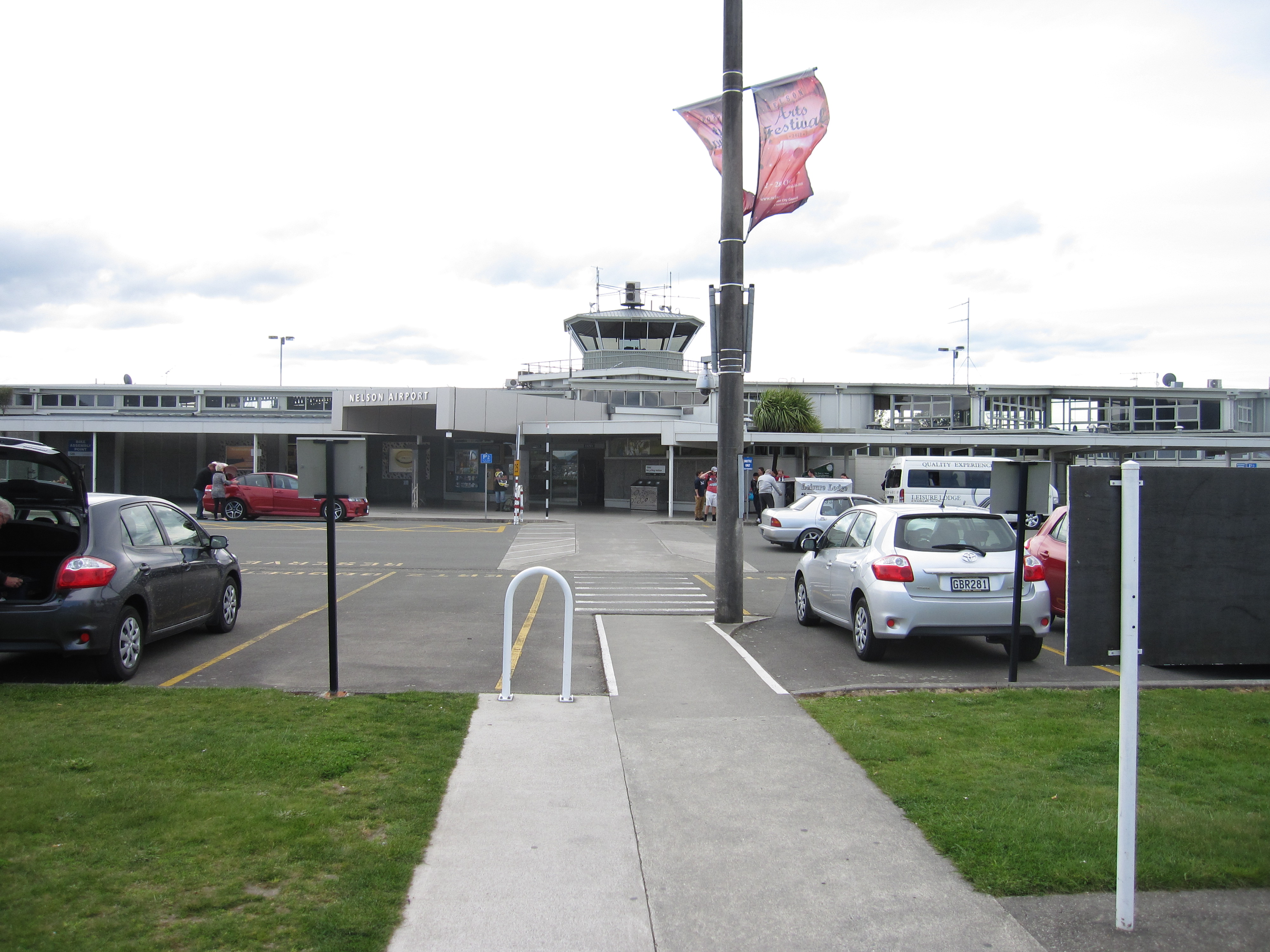
Nelson Airport

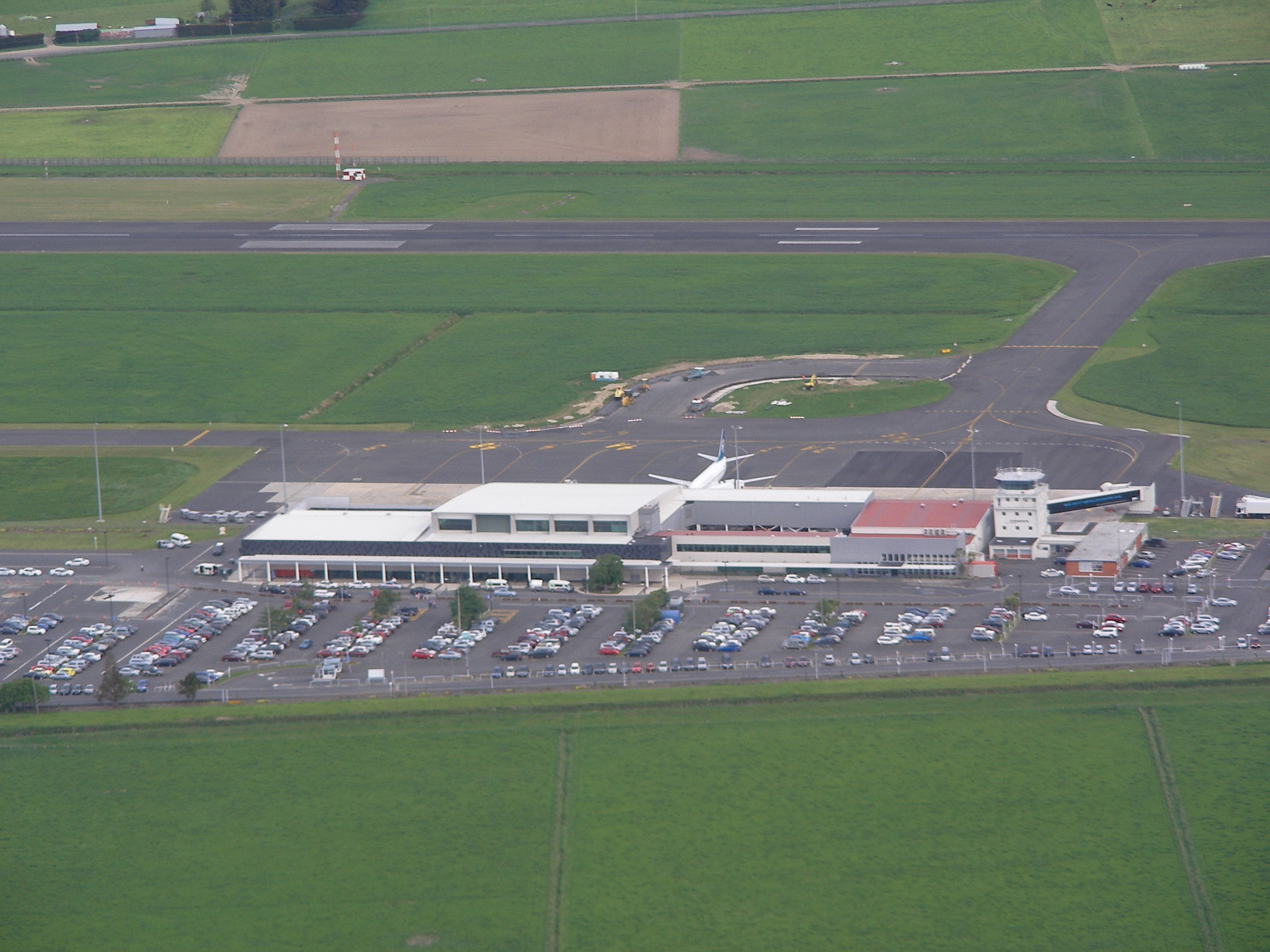
Dunedin Airport

== Passenger numbers ==
=== 2025 ===
Rank	Airport	IATA	Location	Domestic Passengers	International Passengers	Total Passengers
1.	Auckland Airport	AKL	Auckland	8,428,052	10,306,188	18,734,240
2.	Christchurch Airport	CHC	Christchurch	4,830,000	1,560,000	6,390,000
3.	Wellington Airport	WLG	Wellington	4,525,989	790,869	5,316,838
4.	Queenstown Airport	ZQN	Queenstown	1,657,658	944,225	2,601,581
5.	Nelson Airport	NSN	Nelson		-	858,307
6.	Dunedin Airport	DUD	Dunedin	852,940	872	853,812
7.	Hawke's Bay Airport	NPE	Napier		-	612,388
8.	Tauranga Airport	TRG	Tauranga		-	
9.	Palmerston North Airport	PMR	Palmerston North			531,129
10.	Hamilton Airport	HLZ	Hamilton			356,000
11.	New Plymouth Airport	NPL	New Plymouth		-	385,566
12.	Invercargill Airport	IVC	Invercargill		-	338,529
13.	Blenheim Airport	BHE	Blenheim		-	294,376
14.	Rotorua Airport	ROT	Rotorua		-	206,008
15.	Gisborne Airport	GIS	Gisborne		-	

=== 2024 ===
Rank	Airport	IATA	Location	Passengers
1.	Auckland Airport	AKL	Auckland	18,528,725
2.	Christchurch Airport	CHC	Christchurch	6,445,475
3.	Wellington Airport	WLG	Wellington	5,446,121
4.	Queenstown Airport	ZQN	Queenstown	2,487,626
5.	Nelson Airport	NSN	Nelson	915,600
6.	Dunedin Airport	DUD	Dunedin	903,906
7.	Hawke's Bay Airport	NPE	Napier	654,831
8.	Tauranga Airport	TRG	Tauranga	552,989
9.	Palmerston North Airport	PMR	Palmerston North	547,721
10.	New Plymouth Airport	NPL	New Plymouth	399,753
11.	Hamilton Airport	HLZ	Hamilton	371,000
12.	Invercargill Airport	IVC	Invercargill	366,114
13.	Blenheim Airport	BHE	Blenheim	312,220
14.	Rotorua Airport	ROT	Rotorua	232,678
15.	Gisborne Airport	GIS	Gisborne	228,639

=== 2023 ===
Rank	Airport	IATA	Location	Passengers
1.	Auckland Airport	AKL	Auckland	15,861,264
2.	Christchurch Airport	CHC	Christchurch	6,012,328
3.	Wellington Airport	WLG	Wellington	5,413,325
4.	Queenstown Airport	ZQN	Queenstown	2,370,320
5.	Dunedin Airport	DUD	Dunedin	920,349
6.	Nelson Airport	NSN	Nelson	915,173
7.	Hawke's Bay Airport	NPE	Napier	646,096
8.	Palmerston North Airport	PMR	Palmerston North	534,651
9.	Tauranga Airport	TRG	Tauranga	531,041
10.	New Plymouth Airport	NPL	New Plymouth	401,686
11.	Hamilton Airport	HLZ	Hamilton	378,000
12.	Invercargill Airport	IVC	Invercargill	375,000
13.	Blenheim Airport	BHE	Blenheim	318,517
14.	Rotorua Airport	ROT	Rotorua	219,948
15.	Gisborne Airport	GIS	Gisborne	210,215

=== 2022 ===
Rank	Airport	IATA	Location	Passengers
1.	Auckland Airport	AKL	Auckland	11,460,325
2.	Wellington Airport	WLG	Wellington	3,455,858
3.	Christchurch Airport	CHC	Christchurch	3,257,414
4.	Queenstown Airport	ZQN	Queenstown	1,863,590
5.	Dunedin Airport	DUD	Dunedin	626,619
6.	Nelson Airport	NSN	Nelson	619,000
7.	Hawke's Bay Airport	NPE	Napier	394,000
8.	Tauranga Airport	TRG	Tauranga	376,312
9.	Palmerston North Airport	PMR	Palmerston North	323,615
10.	Hamilton Airport	HLZ	Hamilton	283,000
11.	Invercargill Airport	IVC	Invercargill	277,081
12.	New Plymouth Airport	NPL	New Plymouth	243,858
13.	Blenheim Airport	BHE	Blenheim	209,127
14.	Rotorua Airport	ROT	Rotorua	155,459
15.	Gisborne Airport	GIS	Gisborne	134,236

=== 2021 ===
Rank	Airport	IATA	Location	Passengers
1.	Auckland Airport	AKL	Auckland	6,443,639
2.	Wellington Airport	WLG	Wellington	3,977,776
3.	Christchurch Airport	CHC	Christchurch	3,705,373
4.	Queenstown Airport	ZQN	Queenstown	931,659
5.	Dunedin Airport	DUD	Dunedin	761,649
6.	Nelson Airport	NSN	Nelson	725,000
7.	Hawke's Bay Airport	NPE	Napier	461,056
8.	Tauranga Airport	TRG	Tauranga	414,169
9.	Palmerston North Airport	PMR	Palmerston North	401,000
10.	Hamilton Airport	HLZ	Hamilton	358,000
11.	Invercargill Airport	IVC	Invercargill	303,878
12.	New Plymouth Airport	NPL	New Plymouth	277,000
13.	Blenheim Airport	BHE	Blenheim	238,024
14.	Rotorua Airport	ROT	Rotorua	179,500
15.	Gisborne Airport	GIS	Gisborne	115,130

=== 2020 ===
Rank	Airport	IATA	Location	Passengers
1.	Auckland Airport	AKL	Auckland	15,521,054
2.	Christchurch Airport	CHC	Christchurch	5,194,982
3.	Wellington Airport	WLG	Wellington	4,759,442
4.	Queenstown Airport	ZQN	Queenstown	1,291,501
5.	Dunedin Airport	DUD	Dunedin	793,556
6.	Nelson Airport	NSN	Nelson	782,000
7.	Hawke's Bay Airport	NPE	Napier	541,087
8.	Palmerston North Airport	PMR	Palmerston North	498,000
9.	Tauranga Airport	TRG	Tauranga	389,000
10.	New Plymouth Airport	NPL	New Plymouth	324,214
11.	Hamilton Airport	HLZ	Hamilton	304,000
12.	Invercargill Airport	IVC	Invercargill	290,432
13.	Blenheim Airport	BHE	Blenheim	246,325
14.	Rotorua Airport	ROT	Rotorua	205.143
15.	Gisborne Airport	GIS	Gisborne	196,500

=== 2019 ===
Rank	Airport	IATA	Location	Passengers
1.	Auckland Airport	AKL	Auckland	21,625,370
2.	Christchurch Airport	CHC	Christchurch	6,931,441
3.	Wellington Airport	WLG	Wellington	6,441,935
4.	Queenstown Airport	ZQN	Queenstown	2,321,347
5.	Dunedin Airport	DUD	Dunedin	1,077,475
6.	Nelson Airport	NSN	Nelson	1,076,686
7.	Hawke's Bay Airport	NPE	Napier	750,357
8.	Palmerston North Airport	PMR	Palmerston North	687,142
9.	Tauranga Airport	TRG	Tauranga	475,000
10.	New Plymouth Airport	NPL	New Plymouth	456,766
11.	Hamilton Airport	HLZ	Hamilton	382,000
12.	Invercargill Airport	IVC	Invercargill	321,000
13.	Blenheim Airport	BHE	Blenheim	317,000
14.	Rotorua Airport	ROT	Rotorua	265,443
15.	Gisborne Airport	GIS	Gisborne	191,651

=== 2018 ===
Rank	Airport	IATA	Location	Passengers
1.	Auckland Airport	AKL	Auckland	20,530,048
2.	Christchurch Airport	CHC	Christchurch	6,868,948
3.	Wellington Airport	WLG	Wellington	6,213,589
4.	Queenstown Airport	ZQN	Queenstown	2,140,669
5.	Nelson Airport	NSN	Nelson	1,061,000
6.	Dunedin Airport	DUD	Dunedin	1,035,645
7.	Hawke's Bay Airport	NPE	Napier	697,143
8.	Palmerston North Airport	PMR	Palmerston North	675,867
9.	New Plymouth Airport	NPL	New Plymouth	436,912
10.	Tauranga Airport	TRG	Tauranga	405,000
11.	Hamilton Airport	HLZ	Hamilton	353,000
12.	Blenheim Airport	BHE	Blenheim	322,139
13.	Invercargill Airport	IVC	Invercargill	307,308
14.	Rotorua Airport	ROT	Rotorua	246,846
15.	Gisborne Airport	GIS	Gisborne	170,993

=== 2017 ===
Rank	Airport	IATA	Location	Passengers
1.	Auckland Airport	AKL	Auckland	19,020,573
2.	Christchurch Airport	CHC	Christchurch	6,566,598
3.	Wellington Airport	WLG	Wellington	6,049,194
4.	Queenstown Airport	ZQN	Queenstown	1,892,443
5.	Nelson Airport	NSN	Nelson	1,000,373
6.	Dunedin Airport	DUD	Dunedin	973,089
7.	Hawke's Bay Airport	NPE	Napier	652,426
8.	Palmerston North Airport	PMR	Palmerston North	630,000
9.	New Plymouth Airport	NPL	New Plymouth	435,000
10.	Tauranga Airport	TRG	Tauranga	350,085
11.	Hamilton Airport	HLZ	Hamilton	317,348
12.	Blenheim Airport	BHE	Blenheim	302,884
13.	Invercargill Airport	IVC	Invercargill	294,832
14.	Rotorua Airport	ROT	Rotorua	241,303
15.	Gisborne Airport	GIS	Gisborne	156,146

=== 2016 ===
Rank	Airport	IATA	Location	Passengers
1.	Auckland Airport	AKL	Auckland	17,260,349
2.	Christchurch Airport	CHC	Christchurch	6,305,717
3.	Wellington Airport	WLG	Wellington	5,848,795
4.	Queenstown Airport	ZQN	Queenstown	1,651,109
5.	Dunedin Airport	DUD	Dunedin	909,614
6.	Nelson Airport	NSN	Nelson	865,023
7.	Hawke's Bay Airport	NPE	Napier	566,431
8.	Palmerston North Airport	PMR	Palmerston North	515,727
9.	New Plymouth Airport	NPL	New Plymouth	411,661
10.	Hamilton Airport	HLZ	Hamilton	303,000
11.	Tauranga Airport	TRG	Tauranga	298,000
12.	Invercargill Airport	IVC	Invercargill	289,836
13.	Blenheim Airport	BHE	Blenheim	266,905
14.	Rotorua Airport	ROT	Rotorua	222,983
15.	Gisborne Airport	GIS	Gisborne	141,085

=== 2015 ===
Rank	Airport	IATA	Location	Passengers
1.	Auckland Airport	AKL	Auckland	15,892,741
2.	Christchurch Airport	CHC	Christchurch	5,915,785
3.	Wellington Airport	WLG	Wellington	5,457,279
4.	Queenstown Airport	ZQN	Queenstown	1,409,663
5.	Dunedin Airport	DUD	Dunedin	861,982
6.	Nelson Airport	NSN	Nelson	764,050
7.	Hawke's Bay Airport	NPE	Napier	476,489
8.	Palmerston North Airport	PMR	Palmerston North	466,557
9.	New Plymouth Airport	NPL	New Plymouth	342,000
10.	Hamilton Airport	HLZ	Hamilton	291,000
11.	Tauranga Airport	TRG	Tauranga	285,992
12.	Invercargill Airport	IVC	Invercargill	277,838
13.	Blenheim Airport	BHE	Blenheim	250,000
14.	Rotorua Airport	ROT	Rotorua	222,226
15.	Gisborne Airport	GIS	Gisborne	155,897

=== 2014 ===
Rank	Airport	IATA	Location	Passengers
1.	Auckland Airport	AKL	Auckland	15,098,346
2.	Christchurch Airport	CHC	Christchurch	5,709,272
3.	Wellington Airport	WLG	Wellington	5,437,286
4.	Queenstown Airport	ZQN	Queenstown	1,248,878
5.	Dunedin Airport	DUD	Dunedin	853,097
6.	Nelson Airport	NSN	Nelson	744,416
7.	Hawke's Bay Airport	NPE	Napier	456,672
8.	Palmerston North Airport	PMR	Palmerston North	455,166
9.	New Plymouth Airport	NPL	New Plymouth	343,572
10.	Hamilton Airport	HLZ	Hamilton	294,396
11.	Invercargill Airport	IVC	Invercargill	281,811
12.	Tauranga Airport	TRG	Tauranga	273,857
13.	Blenheim Airport	BHE	Blenheim	241,173
14.	Rotorua Airport	ROT	Rotorua	215,276
15.	Gisborne Airport	GIS	Gisborne	155,446

=== 2013 ===
Rank	Airport	IATA	Location	Passengers
1.	Auckland Airport	AKL	Auckland	14,862,485
2.	Christchurch Airport	CHC	Christchurch	5,576,821
3.	Wellington Airport	WLG	Wellington	5,373,622
4.	Queenstown Airport	ZQN	Queenstown	1,215,526
5.	Dunedin Airport	DUD	Dunedin	857,951
6.	Nelson Airport	NSN	Nelson	767,298
7.	Hawke's Bay Airport	NPE	Napier	451,128
8.	Palmerston North Airport	PMR	Palmerston North	445,147
9.	New Plymouth Airport	NPL	New Plymouth	332,178
10.	Hamilton International Airport	HLZ	Hamilton	306,000
11.	Invercargill Airport	IVC	Invercargill	280,000
12.	Tauranga Airport	TRG	Tauranga	261,265
13.	Blenheim Airport	BHE	Blenheim	227,886
14.	Rotorua Airport	ROT	Rotorua	217,545
15.	Gisborne Airport	GIS	Gisborne	133,113

=== 2012 ===
Rank	Airport	IATA	Location	Passengers
1.	Auckland Airport	AKL	Auckland	14,160,640
2.	Christchurch Airport	CHC	Christchurch	5,485,023
3.	Wellington Airport	WLG	Wellington	5,191,729
4.	Queenstown Airport	ZQN	Queenstown	1,156,250
5.	Dunedin Airport	DUD	Dunedin	853,650
6.	Nelson Airport	NSN	Nelson	776,448
7.	Palmerston North Airport	PMR	Palmerston North	449,318
8.	Hawke's Bay Airport	NPE	Napier	440,704
9.	Hamilton International Airport	HLZ	Hamilton	354,000
10.	New Plymouth Airport	NPL	New Plymouth	321,337
11.	Invercargill Airport	IVC	Invercargill	285,000
12.	Tauranga Airport	TRG	Tauranga	248,519
13.	Rotorua Airport	ROT	Rotorua	226,795
14.	Blenheim Airport	BHE	Blenheim	221,707
15.	Gisborne Airport	GIS	Gisborne	132,000

=== 2011 ===
Rank	Airport	IATA	Location	Passengers
1.	Auckland Airport	AKL	Auckland	13,703,043
2.	Christchurch Airport	CHC	Christchurch	5,592,529
3.	Wellington Airport	WLG	Wellington	5,135,000
4.	Queenstown Airport	ZQN	Queenstown	966,574
5.	Dunedin Airport	DUD	Dunedin	776,508
6.	Nelson Airport	NSN	Nelson	758,250
7.	Palmerston North Airport	PMR	Palmerston North	449,090
8.	Hawke's Bay Airport	NPE	Napier	431,903
9.	Hamilton Airport	HLZ	Hamilton	362,000
10.	New Plymouth Airport	NPL	New Plymouth	300,960
11.	Invercargill Airport	IVC	Invercargill	281,633
12.	Tauranga Airport	TRG	Tauranga	246,485
13.	Rotorua Airport	ROT	Rotorua	227,578
14.	Blenheim Airport	BHE	Blenheim	212,179
15.	Gisborne Airport	GIS	Gisborne	134,600

== Total aircraft movements ==
This list includes aircraft operating under both instrument flight rules (IFR) and visual flight rules (VFR) and includes international movements. Consequently, the figures do not distinguish between commercial passenger flights and private aircraft movements. It is compiled from Airways New Zealand movement data.

=== 2021-22 ===
Rank	Airport	IATA	Location	Movements
1	Auckland Airport	AKL	Auckland	54,007
2	Christchurch Airport	CHC	Christchurch	42,653
3	Wellington Airport	WLG	Wellington	41,032
4	Tauranga Airport	TRG	Tauranga	29,807
5	Palmerston North Airport	PMR	Palmerston North	23,651
6	Nelson Airport	NSN	Nelson	21,641
7	Queenstown Airport	ZQN	Queenstown	17,830
8	Hamilton Airport	HLZ	Hamilton	16,281
9	Kapiti Coast Airport	PPQ	Paraparaumu	14,278
10	New Plymouth Airport	NPL	New Plymouth	12,248
11	RNZAF Base Ohakea	OHA	Ohakea	12,008
12	Woodbourne Airport	BHE	Blenheim	10,974
13	Gisborne Airport	GIS	Gisborne	10,082
14	Hawke's Bay Airport	NPE	Napier	10,073
15	Invercargill Airport	IVC	Invercargill	9,282

=== 2018 ===
Rank	Airport	IATA	Location	Movements
1.	Auckland Airport	AKL	Auckland	157,095
2.	Hamilton Airport	HLZ	Hamilton	135,404
3.	Christchurch International Airport	CHC	Christchurch	107,822
4.	Wellington International Airport	WLG	Wellington	101,161
5.	Tauranga Airport	TRG	Tauranga	70,450
6.	Palmerston North Airport	PMR	Palmerston North	55,960
7.	Nelson Airport	NSN	Nelson	45,677
8.	Queenstown Airport	ZQN	Queenstown	43,012
9.	Kapiti Coast Airport	PPQ	Kāpiti Coast	31,241
10.	RNZAF Base Ohakea	OHA	Ohakea	28,807
11.	New Plymouth Airport	NPL	New Plymouth	24,910
12.	Hawke's Bay Airport	NPE	Napier	24,386
13.	Invercargill Airport	IVC	Invercargill	23,058
14.	Dunedin Airport	DUD	Dunedin	22,758
15.	Rotorua Airport	ROT	Rotorua	22,532

=== 2012 ===
Rank	Airport	IATA	Location	Movements
1.	Auckland International Airport	AKL	Auckland	155,903
2.	Hamilton International Airport	HLZ	Hamilton	128,744
3.	Christchurch International Airport	CHC	Christchurch	108,757
4.	Wellington International Airport	WLG	Wellington	102,454
5.	Tauranga Airport	TRG	Tauranga	72,652
6.	Palmerston North International Airport	PMR	Palmerston North	67,395
7.	Nelson Airport	NSN	Nelson	48,073
8.	Queenstown International Airport	ZQN	Queenstown	43,776
9.	Kapiti Coast Airport	PPQ	Kāpiti Coast	33,702
10.	RNZAF Base Ohakea	OHA	Ohakea	30,959
11.	New Plymouth Airport	NPL	New Plymouth	30,773
12.	Invercargill Airport	IVC	Invercargill	28,491
13.	Dunedin International Airport	DUD	Dunedin	25,328
14.	Hawke's Bay Airport	NPE	Napier	25,242
15.	Rotorua International Airport	ROT	Rotorua	22,092

=== 2011 ===
Rank	Airport	IATA	Location	Movements
1.	Auckland International Airport	AKL	Auckland	156,484
2.	Christchurch International Airport	CHC	Christchurch	121,112
3.	Hamilton International Airport	HLZ	Hamilton	110,419
4.	Wellington International Airport	WLG	Wellington	105,585
5.	Tauranga Airport	TRG	Tauranga	74,400
6.	Palmerston North International Airport	PMR	Palmerston North	65,708
7.	RNZAF Base Ohakea	OHA	Ohakea	55,726
8.	Nelson Airport	NSN	Nelson	50,094
9.	Queenstown International Airport	ZQN	Queenstown	41,769
10.	New Plymouth Airport	NPL	New Plymouth	32,791
11.	Invercargill Airport	IVC	Invercargill	30,840
12.	Dunedin International Airport	DUD	Dunedin	29,229
13.	Hawke's Bay Airport	NPE	Napier	27,322
14.	Rotorua International Airport	ROT	Rotorua	22,682
