= Air2there =

New Zealand airline

air2there.com
IATA	ICAO	Call sign
F8	ATT	AIRTOTHERE
- Founded: 2004
- Ceased operations: 2018
- Hubs: Kapiti Coast Airport
- Fleet size: 2
- Destinations: 3
- Headquarters: Kapiti Coast Airport, Paraparaumu New Zealand

air2there was an airline based in New Zealand. It began service in 2004, and was based at the Kapiti Coast Airport, 60 km north of Wellington. It operated scheduled services across Cook Strait. Charter services to other New Zealand destinations were also available. Aero-medical flights were conducted from Wellington Airport using twin turbo prop aircraft. As of November 2018, air2there has not flown since June, and applications to liquidate the airline have been filed. The airline's Cessna Grand Caravan is up for sale

== History ==
The airline was launched in October 2004 by former Paraparaumu Airport owner Murray Cole and his company Integra Investments. He saw a gap in the market by providing a quick alternative to Wellington Airport with the company to be based at Paraparaumu Airport. Flying started with one 14 seat Grand Caravan and two Chieftains. The company started with flights to Blenheim, Masterton, Wellington and Palmerston North, then Nelson and Whanganui were added in February 2005. Flights were later terminated to Masterton, Palmerston North and Whanganui at the end of 2005 when it found there was no market. In May 2013 air2there added a Beech 200 Super King Air to their fleet. This is used for air ambulance operations supporting Life Flight Trust. In 2017 Jetstream series aircraft were added to the fleet for charter and regional services under the Originair brand. Air 2 There was put into receivership in November 2018 with a Piper Navajo and two engines been seized.

== Destinations ==
The following destinations were served by the airline but are currently suspended:

- Blenheim (Woodbourne Airport)
- Nelson (Nelson Airport)
- Paraparaumu (Kapiti Coast Airport)

== Fleet ==
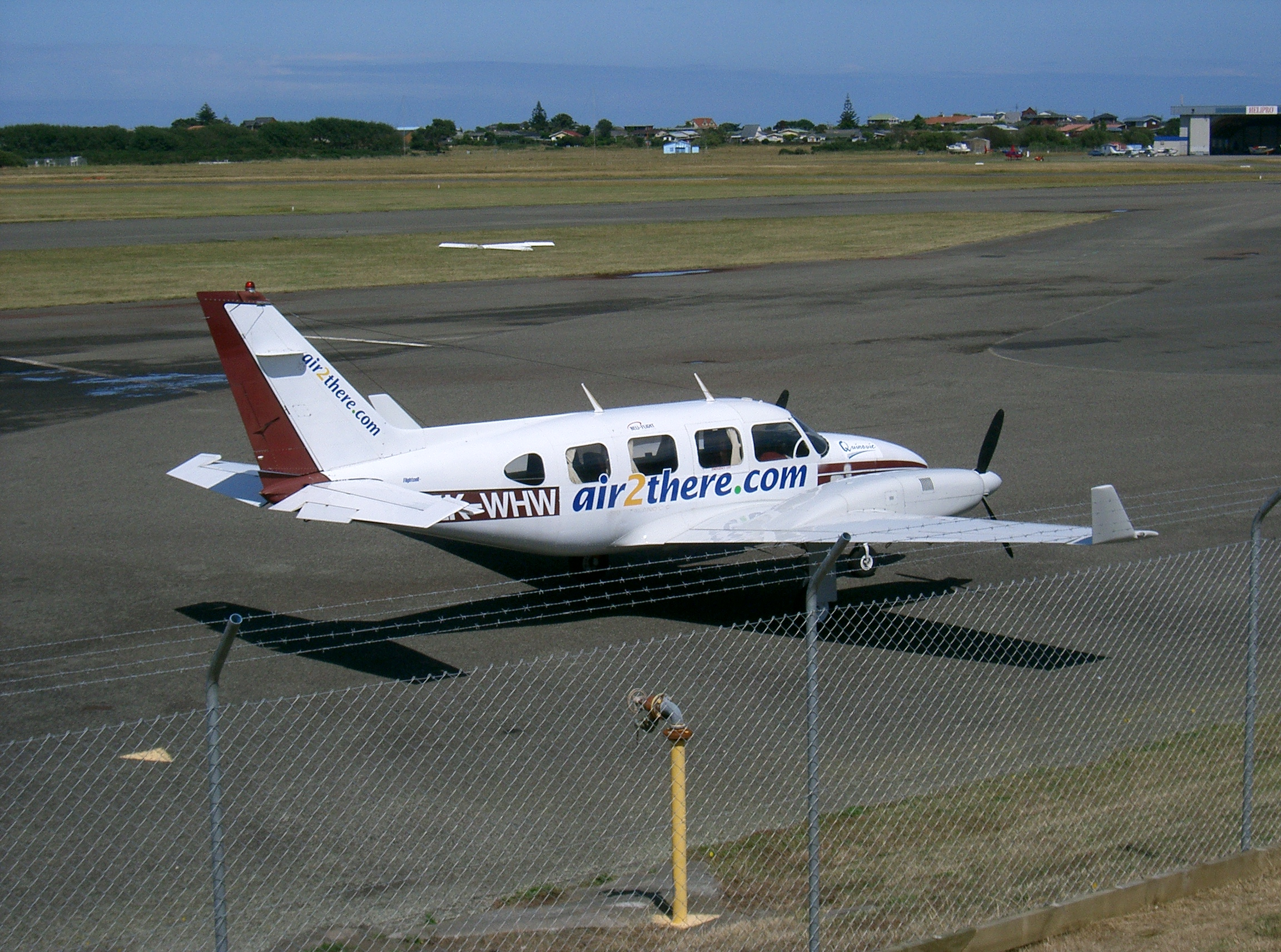
Piper PA-31 of the airline at Kapiti Coast Airport in 2007

Air2there fleet
Aircraft	Total	Retired	Passengers (Business/Economy)	Notes
Beechcraft King Air B200	1		9	Based at Wellington and used as an air ambulance
Cessna 208 B Grand Caravan	1		14	

== See also ==
- List of defunct airlines of New Zealand
