= Rotorua Airport =

Airport in Rotorua, New Zealand

Rotorua Airport Taunga Rererangi o Rotorua (Māori)
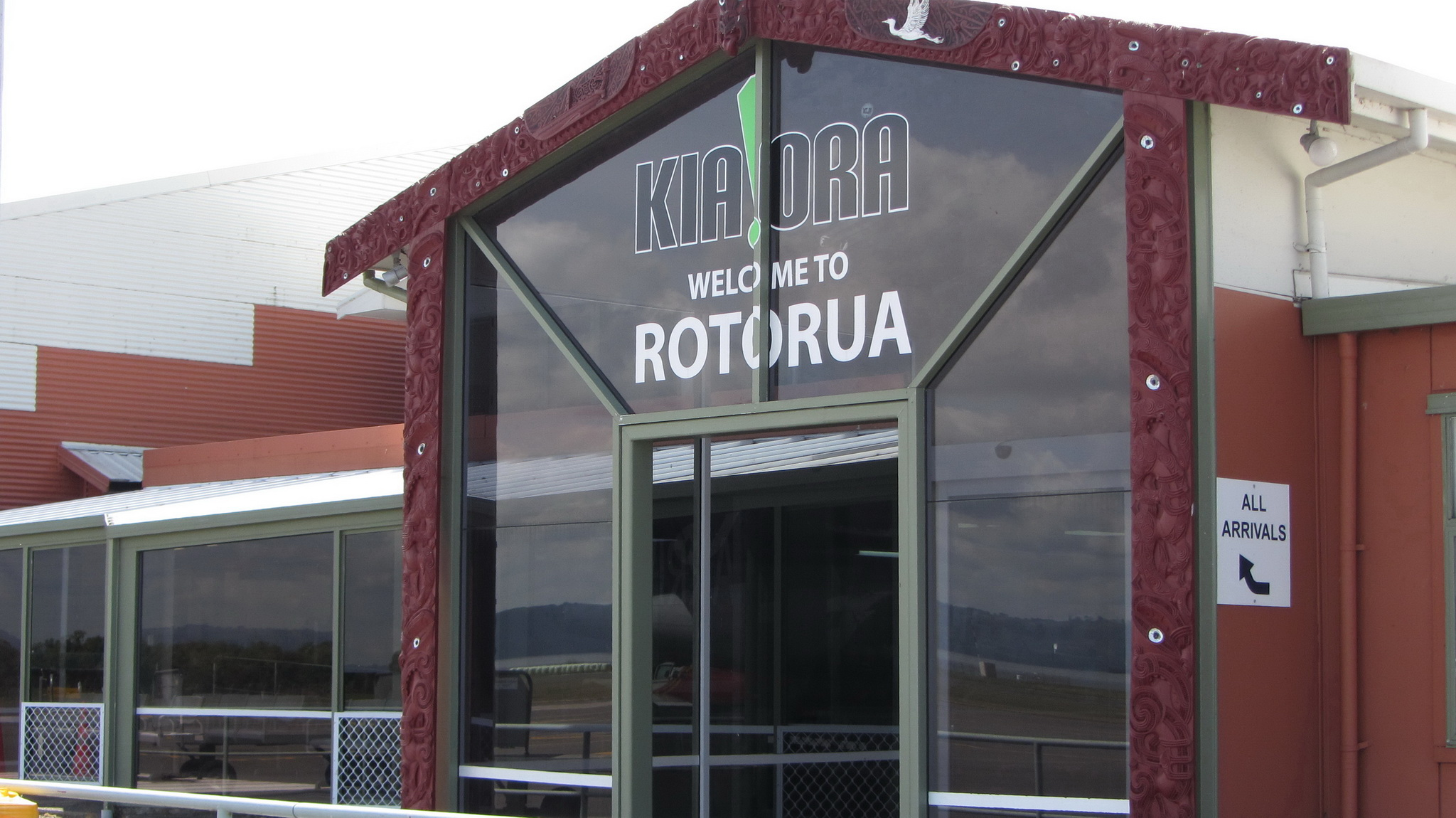
- Entrance to Rotorua Airport, 2013
- IATA: ROT; ICAO: NZRO

Summary
- Airport type: Public
- Owner: Rotorua District Council (100%)
- Operator: Rotorua Airport Limited
- Serves: Rotorua and inland Bay of Plenty
- Location: Rotokawa, Rotorua, New Zealand
- Time zone: NZST (UTC+12:00)
  - Summer (DST): NZDT (UTC+13:00)
- Elevation AMSL: 285 m (935 ft)
- Coordinates: 38°06′33″S 176°19′02″E
- Website: rotorua-airport.co.nz

Map
- Location of airport in North Island

Runways
Direction	Length		Surface
Direction	m	ft	Surface
18R/36L	2,114	6,936	Asphalt
18L/36R	773	2,536	Grass

Statistics (2023)
- Passengers: 219,948

Rotorua Airport (Māori: Taunga Rererangi o Rotorua) (IATA: ROT, ICAO: NZRO) is an airport in Rotorua, New Zealand, located on Te Ngae Road (SH30) in the suburb of Rotokawa, approximately 6 km north east of Rotorua CBD. The terminal consists of a two-storey building with six tarmac gates and is home to a cafe, book store and conference room, followed by general aviation hangars located to both the north and the south of the main terminal with an avgas pump at the southern end of the apron. The airport's main runway (18R/36L) is 2114m long and is sealed with asphalt, accompanied with a shorter grass runway (18L/36R) which runs parallel to the main runway, although the proximity of the two runways means that they can't be used simultaneously.

Currently, the airport is served by Air New Zealand's regional subsidiaries with flights to Auckland, Wellington and Christchurch, as well as a number of charter and scenic airlines also operate on a regular basis. In the past, the airport has been served by a number of airlines on domestic routes including Ansett New Zealand, Origin Pacific Airways and Qantas, the third of which were withdrawn in 2009 when Jetstar took over domestic flying from its parent. The airport received international services for the first time in December 2009 when Air New Zealand began flights from Sydney, although this service eventually ended in April 2015 partially due to its proximity to other airports such as Hamilton.

== History ==
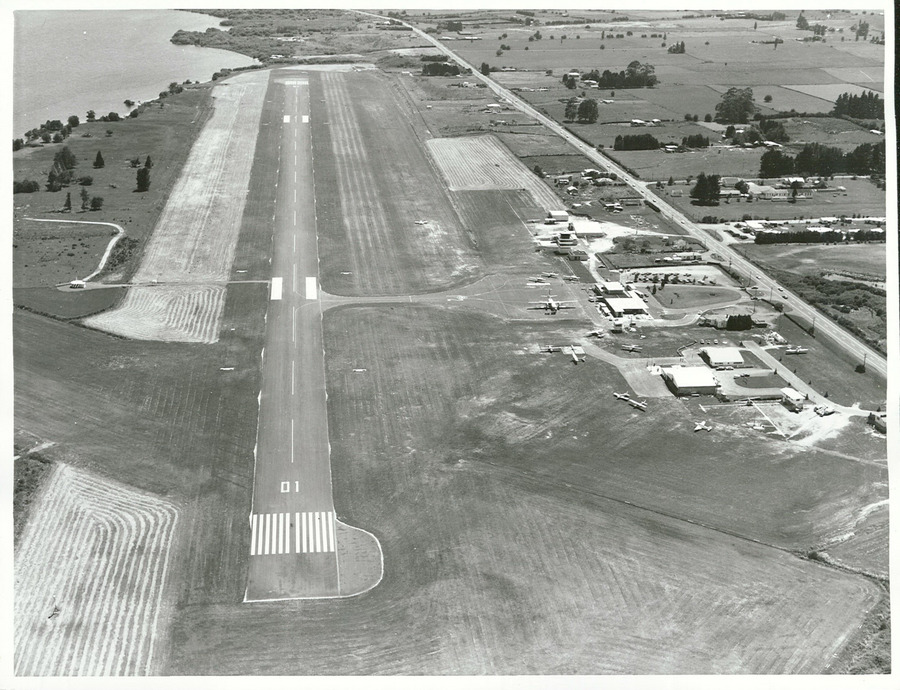
Aerial view of Rotorua Airport in 1975

Rotorua Airport opened in 1964, with a 1378m x 30m sealed runway that could accommodate National Airways Corporation's Douglas DC-3 and Fokker F27 aircraft. It replaced the old Whakarewarewa Aerodrome, which was located just north of Sala Street in what is now a residential area. In 2002, an extension to the southern end of the airport's runway brought its total length to 1622m. Plans to further increase the main runway's length in two stages, initially by 150 metres at the northern end followed by 487 metres at the southern end (including newly mandated overrun areas), were approved in 2008 after a lengthy consultation process and court battle.

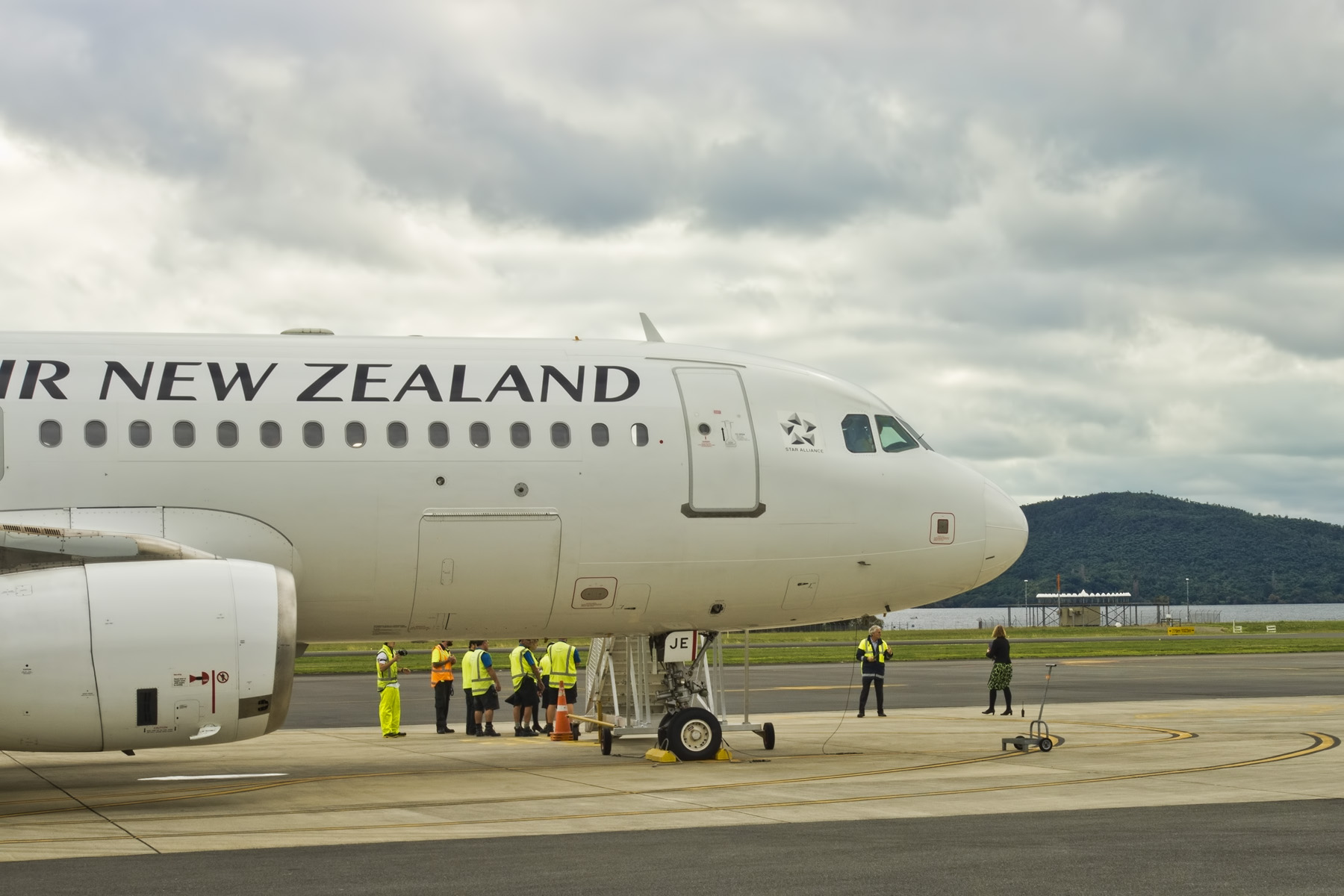
Crew gathering before Air New Zealand's final international flight from Rotorua, 25 April 2015

The initial increase in length would allow operations by Airbus A320 aircraft to Australia, albeit with capacity restrictions, and the subsequent southern extension would allow these aircraft to serve the airport without capacity restrictions. The project was completed in 2009 and brought the combined length of the runway and overrun areas to 2,304 metres. These extensions, in conjunction with the already-completed upgrade of the terminal building and facilities, made the airport capable of handling international flights to Australia. Following the upgrade, Air New Zealand announced that it would begin flights between Rotorua and Sydney on 12 December 2009, the service being partially funded by the Rotorua District Council. To coincide with the introduction of international flights, the airport was renamed Rotorua International Airport.

The flights across the Tasman initially operated twice weekly (on Tuesdays and Saturdays), but dropped to one flight a week during off-peak months before winter services were suspended entirely in 2014. In October 2014, the Rotorua District Council decided, in conjunction with Air New Zealand, to stop subsidising the service as they felt that the amount they were funding, which equated to around $1 million per year, could be better spent on other initiatives. Therefore, it was announced that flights to Sydney would cease, and the final international flight from the airport was on 25 April 2015. Following the discontinuation of international flights, the airport stated that it was going to focus on strengthening domestic routes and was specifically interested in initiating non-stop flights to Queenstown.

== Controversy ==
The expansion of Rotorua Airport to an international airport has encountered both strong opposition and support from locals. Critics cite concern over on-going debt servicing and operating costs, anticipated noise levels, the destruction of natural forest and privately owned planted trees to accommodate the newly lowered flight path, and potential safety issues. The Ngāti Uenukukopako tribe, whose marae is located at the northern end of the runway, have taken a complaint to the New Zealand Human Rights Commission, and residents at the southern end of the runway continue to resist the Airport Company's programme to enforce cutting of trees which have been a longstanding feature of the area.

== Airlines and destinations ==
Airlines	Destinations
Air New Zealand	Auckland, Christchurch, Wellington

== See also ==
- List of airports in New Zealand
- List of airlines of New Zealand
- Transport in New Zealand
- List of busiest airports in New Zealand
