= Origin Pacific Airways =

New Zealand airline

IATA	ICAO	Call sign
QO	OGN	ORIGIN
- Founded: 1996
- Commenced operations: April 1997
- Ceased operations: 15 September 2006
- Hubs: Nelson Airport
- Fleet size: See Below
- Destinations: See Below
- Headquarters: Nelson, New Zealand

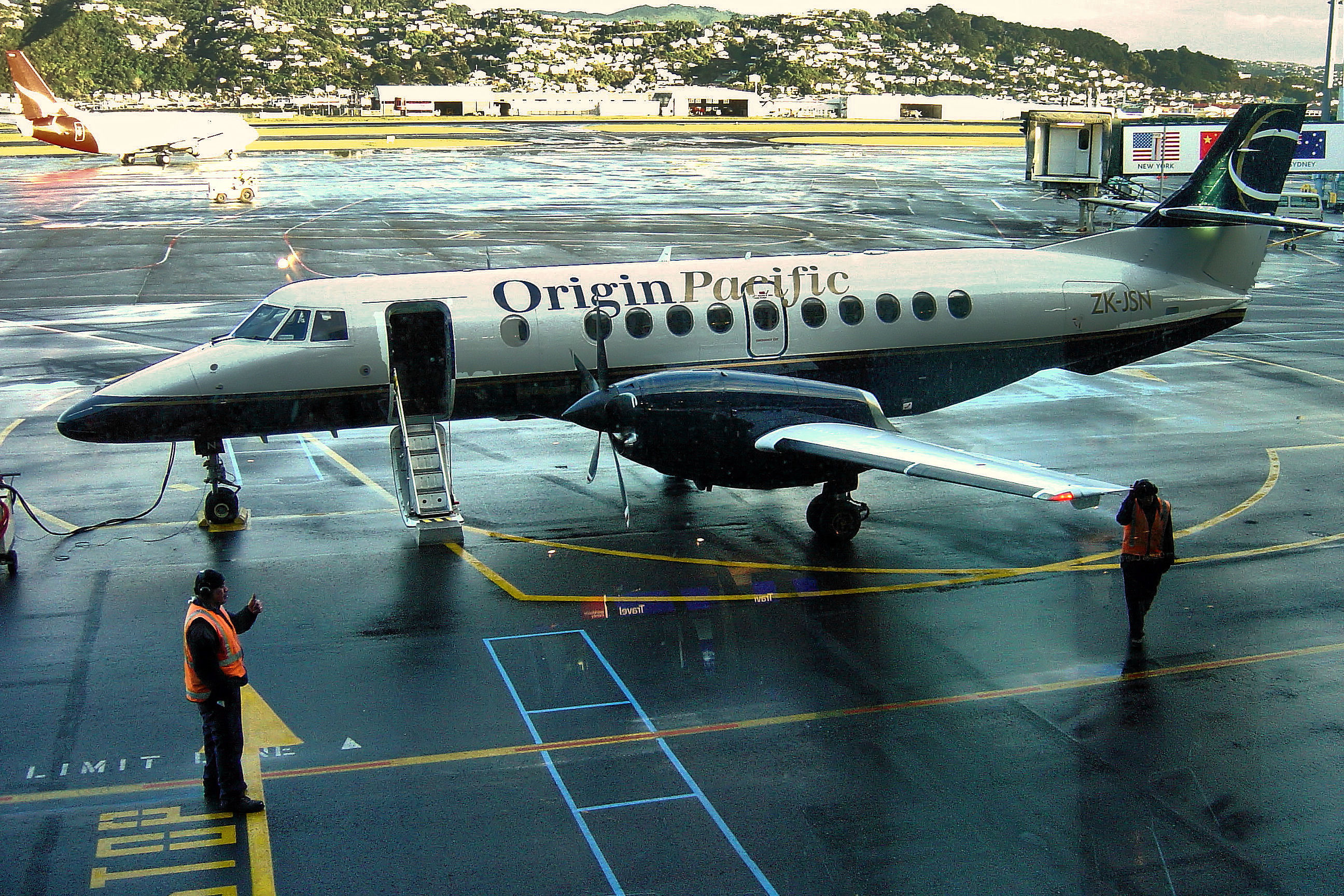
Origin Pacific Airways BAe Jetstream 41 at Wellington Airport in June 2004.

Origin Pacific Airways was an airline based in Nelson in New Zealand. Its main base was at Nelson Airport (NSN). It ceased passenger operations on 10 August 2006, and its residual freight operations on 15 September 2006.

== History ==
=== Starting out ===
Origin Pacific Airways was established by Robert Inglis and Nicki Smith in 1996 and started operations in April 1997. Inglis and Smith had previously established Air Nelson which they subsequently sold to Air New Zealand. Mike Pero and a group of Wellington investors each also owned 25% shares in the company.

=== Code-share with Qantas Jetconnect ===
Origin operated code-share flights on behalf of Jetconnect (a subsidiary of Qantas) from mid 2001 to early 2004. When the code-share agreement was cancelled the airline lost around 60% of its business. Routes served on behalf of Jetconnect included Rotorua and Queenstown. Origin operated ATR-72-212 and Dash 8 100 and 300 aircraft on those routes. Jetconnect took over these routes using their own Boeing 737 aircraft.

The loss of the code-share with Jetconnect was a major blow to the airline. They lost access to Qantas's international network and had to compete against the government-backed Air New Zealand and with a competing Jetconnect. The code-share loss thus resulted in the scaling back of jobs and aircraft.

=== Collapse ===
The airline ceased passenger operations on 10 August 2006 when the airline could not service its debts to airports and to Inland Revenue. At the time the airline ceased passenger operations, Origin's passenger numbers were up more than usual. Freight operations finished on 15 September 2006.

== Destinations ==
Prior to the suspension of domestic passenger services, the airline (as at January 2005) operated services to the following scheduled destinations:

Destination	Country	IATA	ICAO	Airport	Start	End	Status
Auckland	New Zealand	AKL	NZAA	Auckland International Airport			Terminated
Blenheim	New Zealand	BHE	NZWB	Woodbourne Airport			Terminated
Christchurch	New Zealand	CHC	NZCH	Christchurch International Airport			Terminated
Dunedin	New Zealand	DUD	NZDN	Dunedin International Airport		15 January 2005	Terminated
Hamilton	New Zealand	HLZ	NZHN	Hamilton Airport			Terminated
Invercargill	New Zealand	IVC	NZNV	Invercargill Airport			Terminated
Napier	New Zealand	NPE	NZNR	Hawke's Bay Airport			Terminated
Nelson	New Zealand	NSN	NZNS	Nelson Airport			Terminated
New Plymouth	New Zealand	NPL	NZNP	New Plymouth Airport			Terminated
Palmerston North	New Zealand	PMR	NZPM	Palmerston North International Airport			Terminated
Queenstown	New Zealand	ZQN	NZQN	Queenstown Airport			Terminated
Rotorua	New Zealand	ROT	NZRO	Rotorua Regional Airport			Terminated
Taupō	New Zealand	TUO	NZAP	Taupo Airport			Terminated
Tauranga	New Zealand	TRG	NZTG	Tauranga Airport			Terminated
Wellington	New Zealand	WLG	NZWN	Wellington International Airport			Terminated
Whanganui	New Zealand	WAG	NZWU	Wanganui Airport			Terminated

== Fleet ==
During its operation Origin Pacific operated the following aircraft:

- 4 BAe Jetstream 31
- 3 BAe Jetstream 32
- 5 BAe Jetstream 41
- 1 Cessna 421
- 2 ATR-72-212
- 3 DHC-8-100
- 2 DHC-8-300
- 1 Fairchild-Swearingen Metroliner III
- 3 Fairchild-Swearingen Metroliner 23

== See also ==
- List of defunct airlines of New Zealand
- History of aviation in New Zealand
