= New Plymouth Airport =

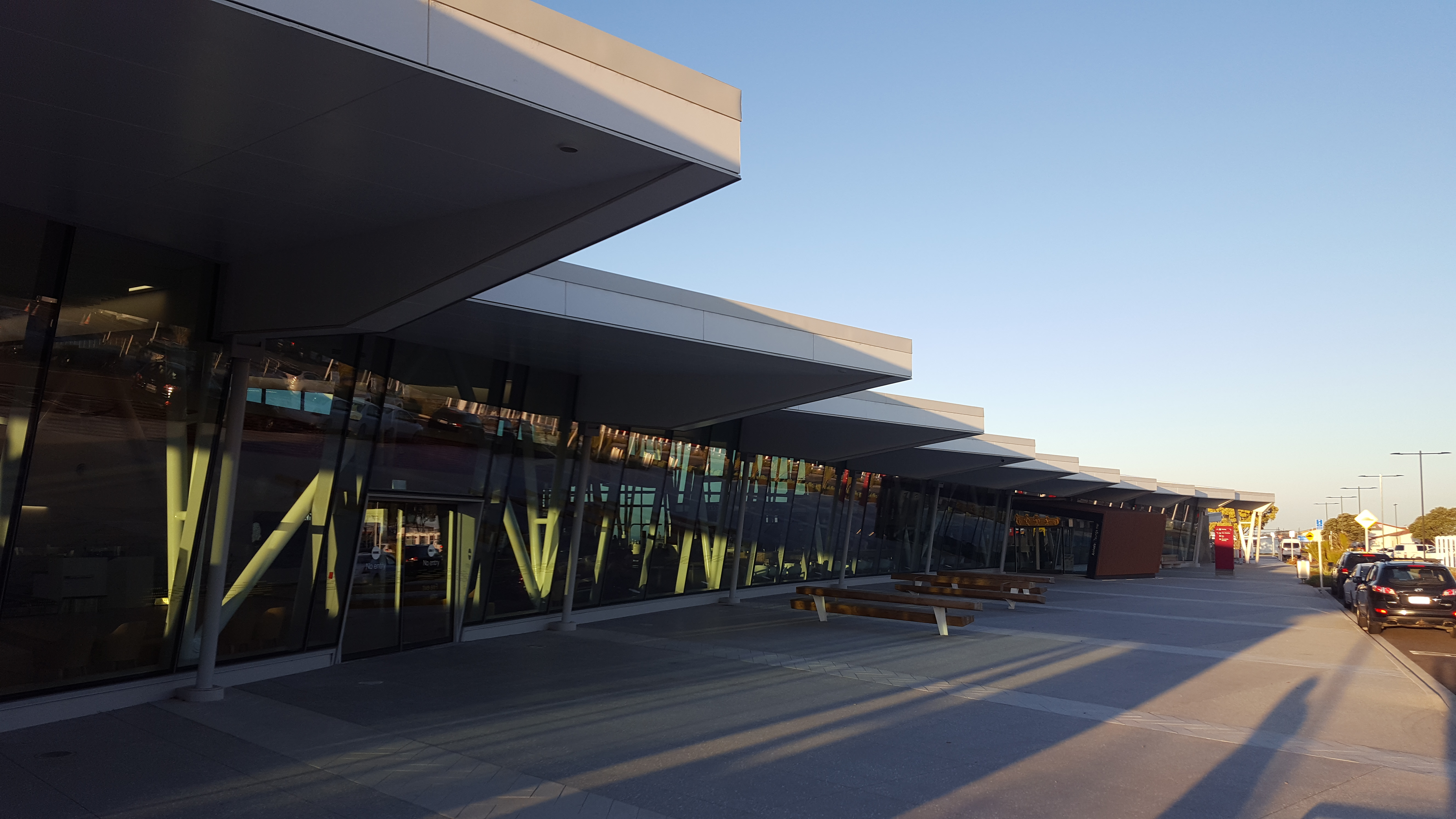
- IATA: NPL; ICAO: NZNP

Summary
- Airport type: Public
- Owner: New Plymouth District Council
- Operator: New Plymouth District Council
- Location: New Plymouth
- Elevation AMSL: 30 m (98 ft)
- Coordinates: 39°00′31″S 174°10′45″E
- Website: www.nplairport.co.nz

Map
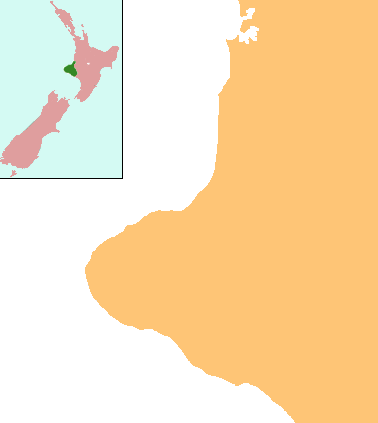
- Location of airport in Taranaki

Runways
Direction	Length		Surface
Direction	m	ft	Surface
05R/23L	1,000	3,281	Grass
05L/23R	1,310	4,298	Asphalt
14/32	1,200	3,937	Grass

Statistics (2016)
- Passengers: 411,661

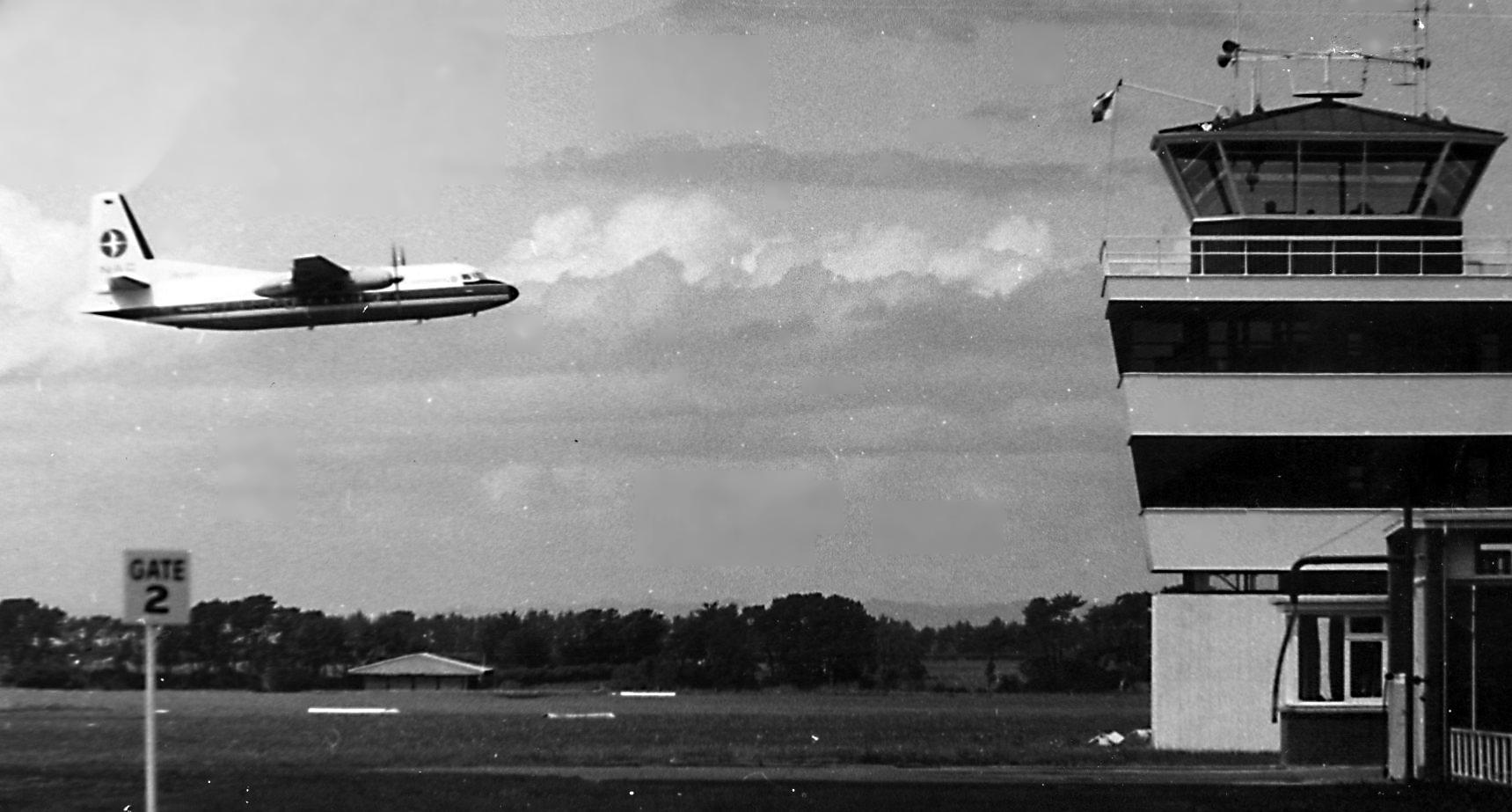
New Plymouth Airport control tower in 1970

New Plymouth Airport (IATA: NPL, ICAO: NZNP) serves the city of New Plymouth, and the surrounding region of Taranaki. It is located on the west coast of New Zealand's North Island and is 11 km from the city centre, on State Highway 3 north to Auckland, and 4 km from the outer suburb/satellite town of Bell Block.

New Plymouth Airport is serviced by Air New Zealand with daily flights to Auckland, Wellington and Christchurch.

Jetstar Airways commenced daily services between New Plymouth and Auckland on 1 February 2016. Jetstar Airways had originally planned to conduct 27 weekly return flights between New Plymouth and Auckland, however only 20 return flights weekly were offered. The Jetstar flights were operated by QantasLink's Eastern Australia Airlines. Jetstar cancelled those services at the end of November 2019.

From 29 September 2017, Originair began direct flights between New Plymouth and Nelson, New Zealand. On 30 September 2018, Originair launched direct flights between New Plymouth and Napier, New Zealand. The airline provided daily flights between the two cities. The company's British Aerospace 18-seat Jetstream aircraft flew the route and the company was adding another Jetstream to its operations to cover contracted charter flights, tours and maintenance coverage. Originair suspended those services at the end of November 2019 until the new terminal opened. Also, the handling company, Swissport, who has carrying out check-in and tarmac services for both Jetstar and Originair, terminated the service at the same time.

In terms of passenger numbers, it was the 9th busiest airport in New Zealand in 2016, with 411,661 people flying from or to the airport, a 20.3 percent increase on 2015 statistics. Jetstar's new regional services to New Plymouth were responsible for the significant increase, according to airport management. Hence, more people flew to New Plymouth than other cities with larger populations such as Hamilton and Tauranga. In October 2009, New Plymouth Airport was voted as the best regional airport in New Zealand and in September 2020 the airport was voted 2nd place in the Best Regional Airport poll conducted by Newshub.

== History ==
The original airport opened in 1933 with the New Plymouth Airport Act. It had five runways, the longest of which was around 1,500 m (5,000 ft). During World War II, the airport became the RNZAF Bell Block Airbase. Les Munro, one of the pilots in the Dambusters Raid, soloed here on the Tiger Moth. Post war, the airport returned to civilian use, and was used by the New Zealand National Airways Corporation with links to Whenuapai (Auckland) and Paraparaumu (Wellington).

In line with a general improvement of New Zealand's infrastructure throughout the 1950s and 1960s, and the National Airways Corporation (NZNAC) acquisition of Fokker F27 Friendships, New Plymouth's airport was reviewed. In view of the undulating land, the need for a tarmac runway for the F27, and the clearer approach paths required, a new airfield was soon under construction at the end of Brown Road (recently renamed Airport Drive). During construction of the airport, a small hill at the west end of the runway had to be levelled off, due to take-off and landing path infringements. This was rather controversial, due to said hill being a Māori burial ground. The government of the day decided to go ahead with construction anyway, and despite protests, the hill was levelled. Part of it still remains. The airport opened in 1966, replacing a grass airfield 3 km southwest, which is now industrial land. The foundation stone from the original airport, and a stone commemorating RNZAF Bell Block, were moved to the new airport when it opened.

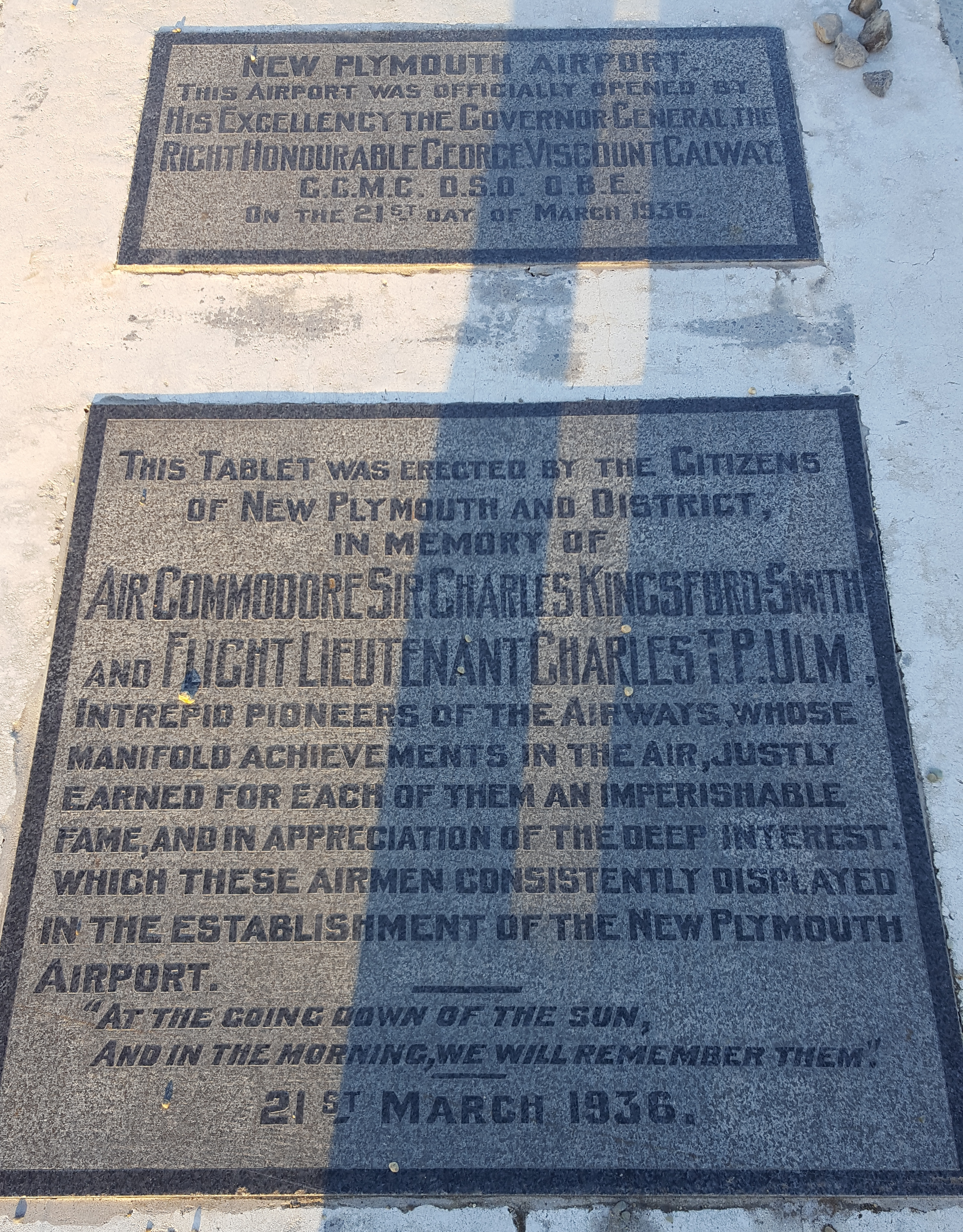
New Plymouth Airport memorial stones

The original terminal was renovated during the 1990s. The observation deck upstairs was removed at this time, and the outside observation area was removed in 2005, due to rising security concerns worldwide.

From 2015 to 2020, New Plymouth Airport had two domestic terminal buildings. The main terminal building was equipped with a cafe, a Koru Regional Lounge and Air New Zealand check-in counters. The second terminal building known as Terminal 2 was occupied by low-cost airline Jetstar Airways and Nelson based Originair. Terminal 2 was equipped with two Jetstar check-in counters, two Originair check-in counters and a baggage claim area. The two terminal buildings had 8 aircraft gates combined, of which Terminal 2 exclusively used Gate 8.

In August 2015, when Jetstar announced they would commence services to New Plymouth in December 2015, the plans were delayed until 1 February 2016 to allow for a $1 million terminal building to be created at New Plymouth Airport dedicated to Jetstar's regional services. The main terminal building was too small for two commercial airline carriers and therefore a second building was required. Additional aircraft gates were also added.

New Plymouth Airport has a control tower with services provided by Airways Corporation. It is staffed from 0630 to around 2105 on weekdays, and reduced hours on weekends, to coincide with airline traffic movements. The airport also provides Rescue Fire Service. They are on duty for regular scheduled passenger flights and by request for 'after hours'

The Taranaki Air Ambulance Trust operates from the airport as well.

The airport's only sealed taxiway connects the apron and the asphalt runway, so aircraft taxi on the runway, and commence take off roll from runway ends. New Plymouth Airport is infamous for crosswinds, due mostly to the fact that although the tarmac runway faces into the prevailing SSW wind the area regularly receives a strong SSE/SE. The cross runway is not sealed, and thus airline traffic is limited to the tarmac runway, parallel to the sea. The tarmac runway is equipped with low intensity runway lighting, runway end lighting, and Precision Approach Path Indicators. The sealed taxiway and apron are also lit. The airport has VOR/DME equipment. It was equipped with an NDB, but this was recently removed.

New Plymouth Aero Club and its Air New Plymouth charter service was based at the airport, until it ceased operations in 2014. Previously it carried out charter work and air ambulance services as well as providing a well recognised flight training facility.

General aviation aircraft are located at the airport as well as heritage De Havilland Vampire, an L-39 Albatross, four Yak 52s and a Catalina Flying Boat.

== Terminal upgrade ==
In 2017, a proposal for a $29 million airport terminal upgrade at New Plymouth Airport was given its final approval by the New Plymouth District Council.

The airport's existing terminal building opened in 1967 and was designed to handle just 60,000 passengers per year. In 2016, 411,661 people flew in and out of New Plymouth making it the 9th busiest airport in the country. In an uncommon move, councillors approved the most expensive option for the redevelopment which included cultural aspects in the design and rejected plans for a cheaper, more functional building without any arguing.

The new master plan proposed a major expansion of the terminal so it would have a floor area of 4092 square metres instead of the existing 1430 square metres. The design featured separate arrival and departure gates, installing a larger mechanical baggage claim, a larger Air New Zealand lounge, more space for retail and the cafe, and the ability to create a passenger security area if required in the future. The master plan also proposed a two-stage runway extension to better cater for larger ATR aircraft which are now regularly using the airport. The current runway length limits their operation under certain conditions so the proposal is for an initial extension to 1500m and then potentially to 1700m.

The cultural narrative of the site was central to the terminal's design, with artist Rangi Kipa (Puketapu) taking a lead role in the construction which reflects the ancestral story of the Te Atiawa iwi (tribe) and helps reconnect it with its land (whenua). Kipa said the site of the airport was an important one to the iwi and it was important this was reflected: "We've been invisible on the landscape for long enough and we're not going to take it any more so our people have an aspiration to be not only prosperous but visible on the landscape again and that's just I suppose ground zero for us." New Plymouth Airport opened the new terminal building, named Te Hono, to its first flight on Tuesday 17 March 2020.

The new terminal can cater for up to 650,000 people and includes a new retail space, a convenience grab and go offering, and the café/bar Airspresso. The modular design of the new building allows for expansion as passenger numbers increase year to year. As part of the works an airside viewing area has been created to the east of the new building which will enhance the customer experience by providing non-passengers the ability to see the airside view of the terminal building.

In July 2021 New Plymouth Airport, designed by Beca Architects, was nominated for the Prix Versailles 2021 in the Airports category, other finalists been the upgrade to New York's LaGuardia Airport, Berlin Brandenburg Airport, and international airports in Athens, Kazakhstan and the Philippines. In December 2021 New Plymouth Airport Terminal has been awarded the World Special Prize for Exterior.

== Te Matakupenga solar farm ==
A 10 MW solar farm, with nearly 14,400 solar panels on 15 ha (37 acres) of farmland was built adjacent to the airport. Installation of the panels was completed in January 2025, and the farm was completed in September 2025. The farm also includes a 1000kWh battery storage system, making the airport 98% self-sufficient in electricity.

== Photo Gallery ==
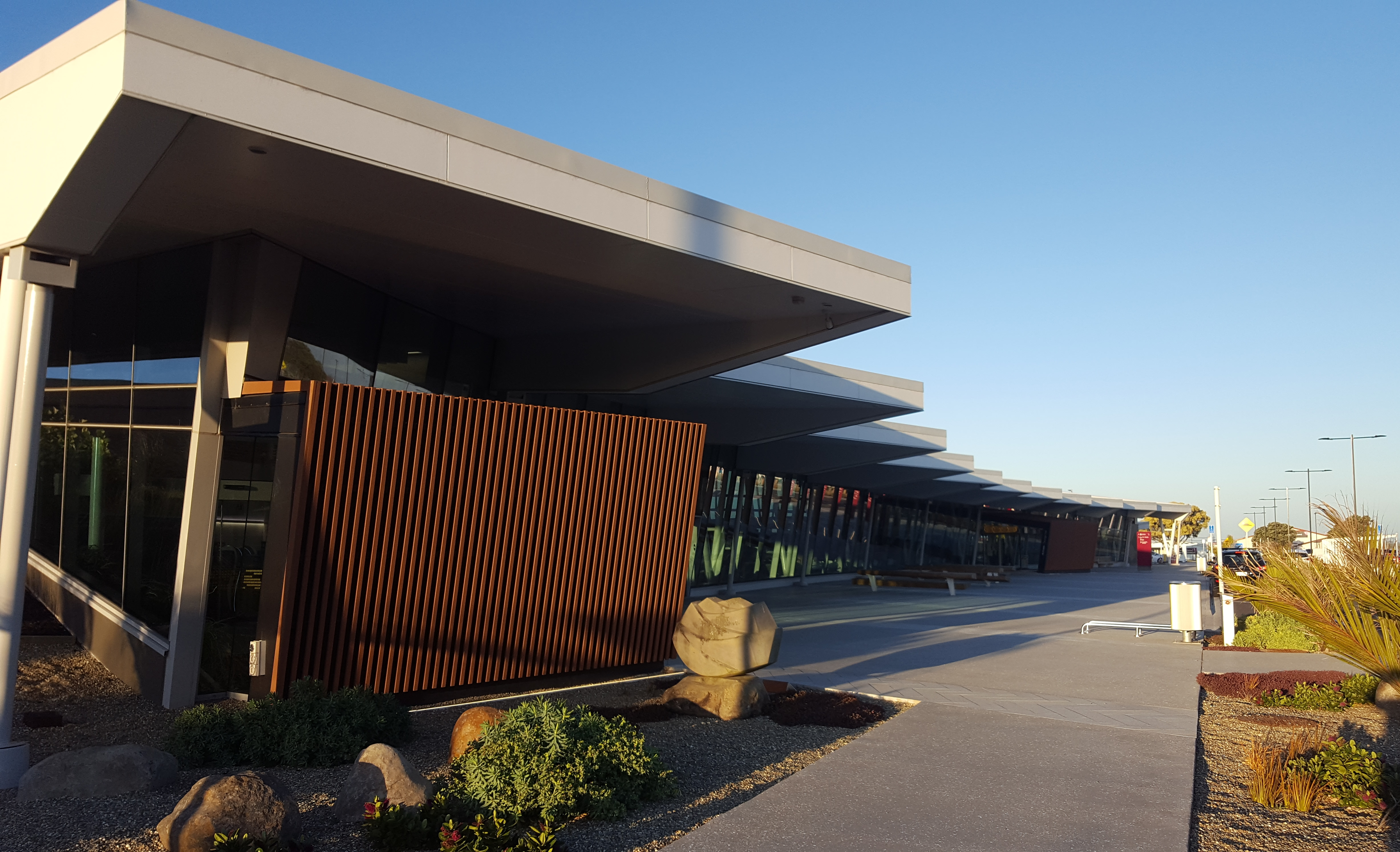
New Plymouth Airport

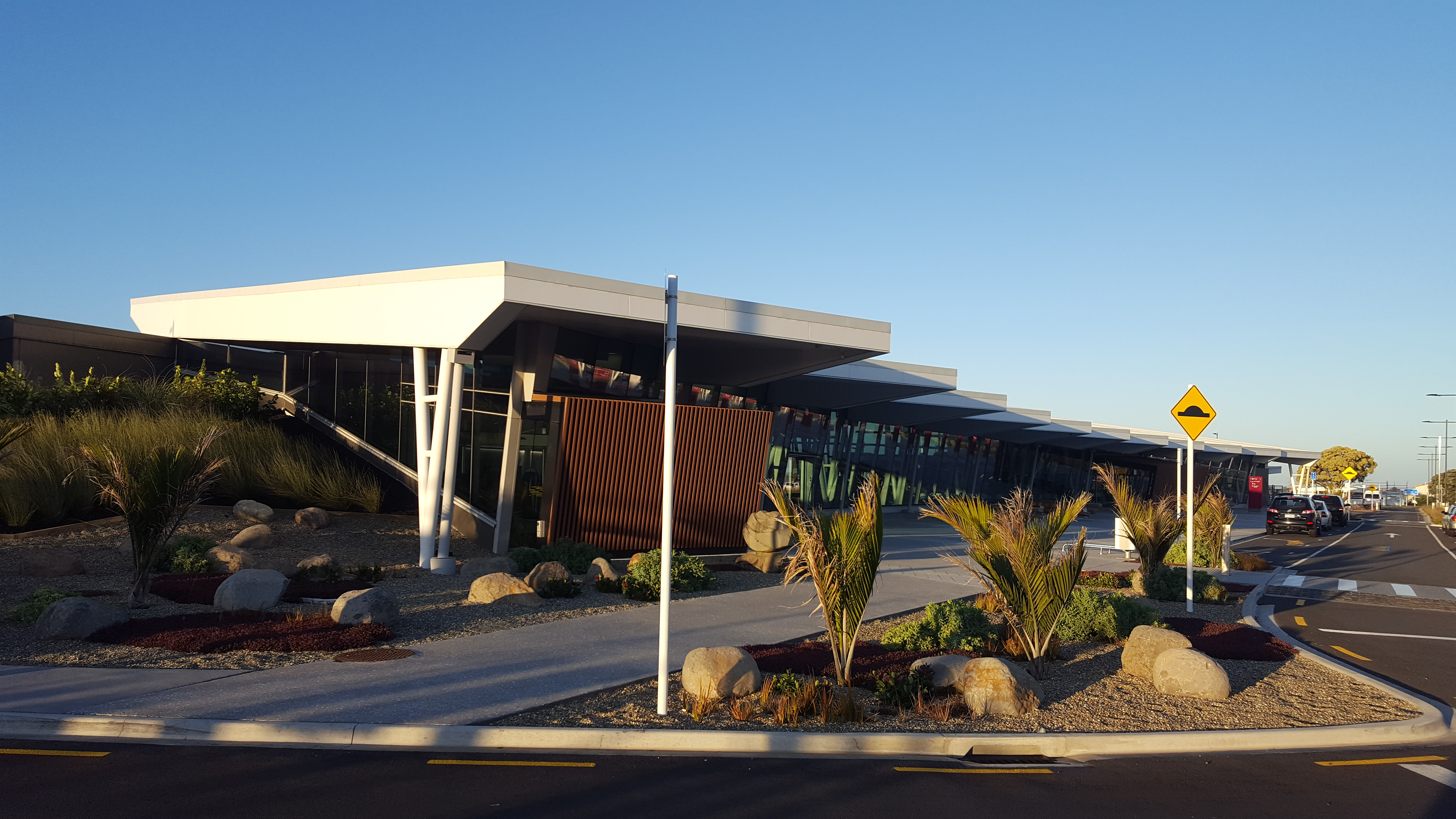
New Plymouth Airport - Front

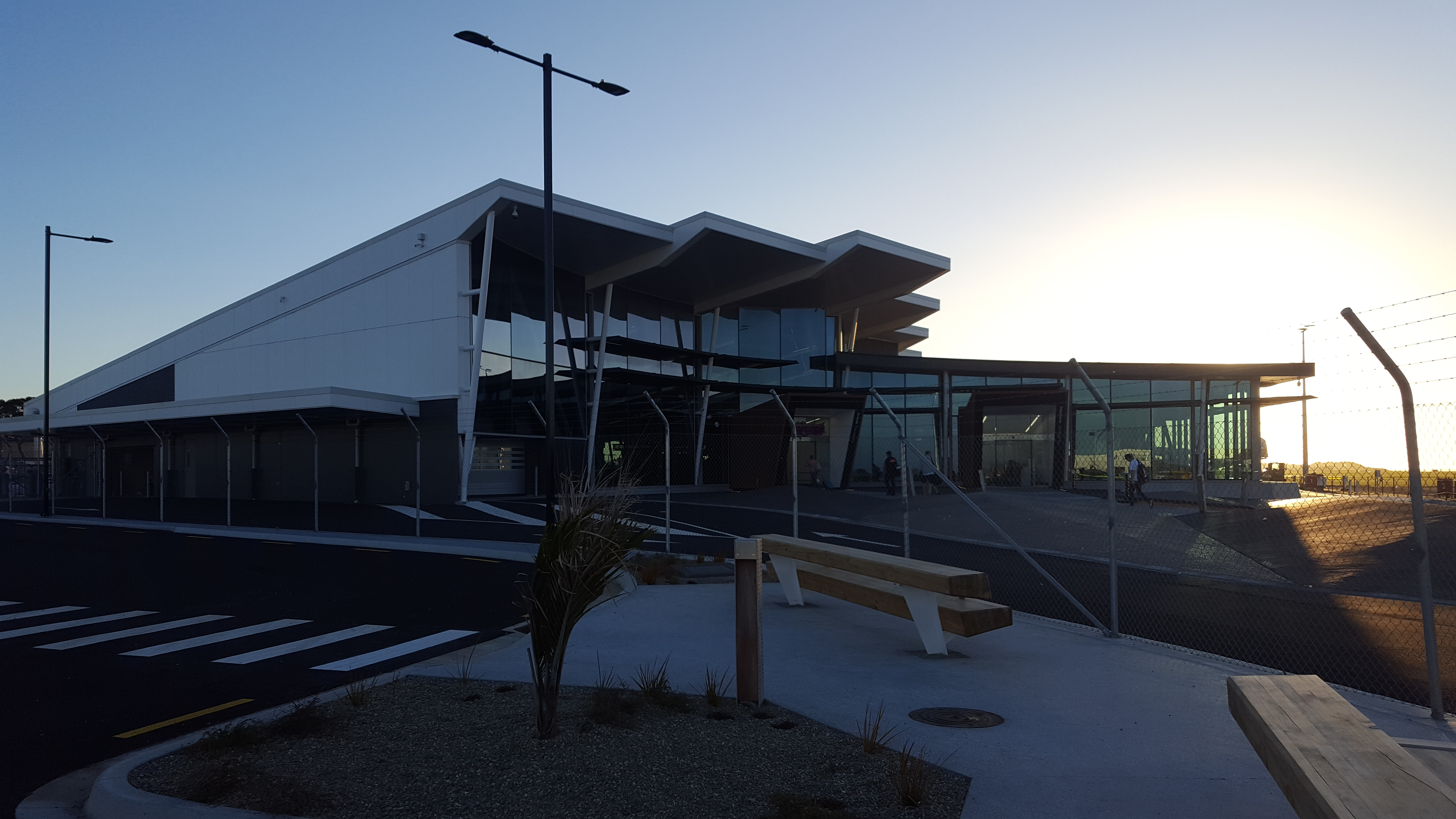
New Plymouth Airport and the Viewing Area

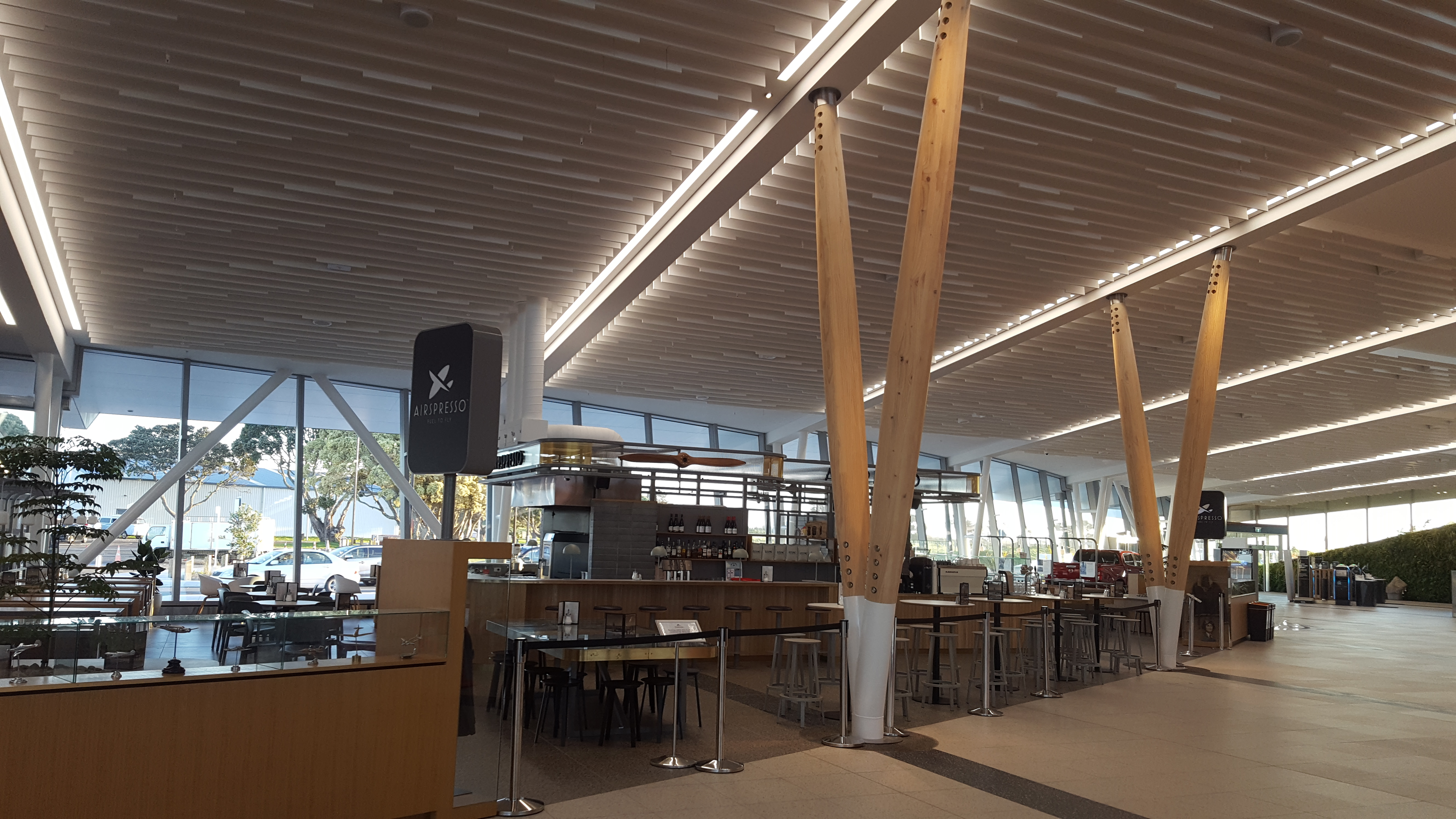
Inside New Plymouth Airport

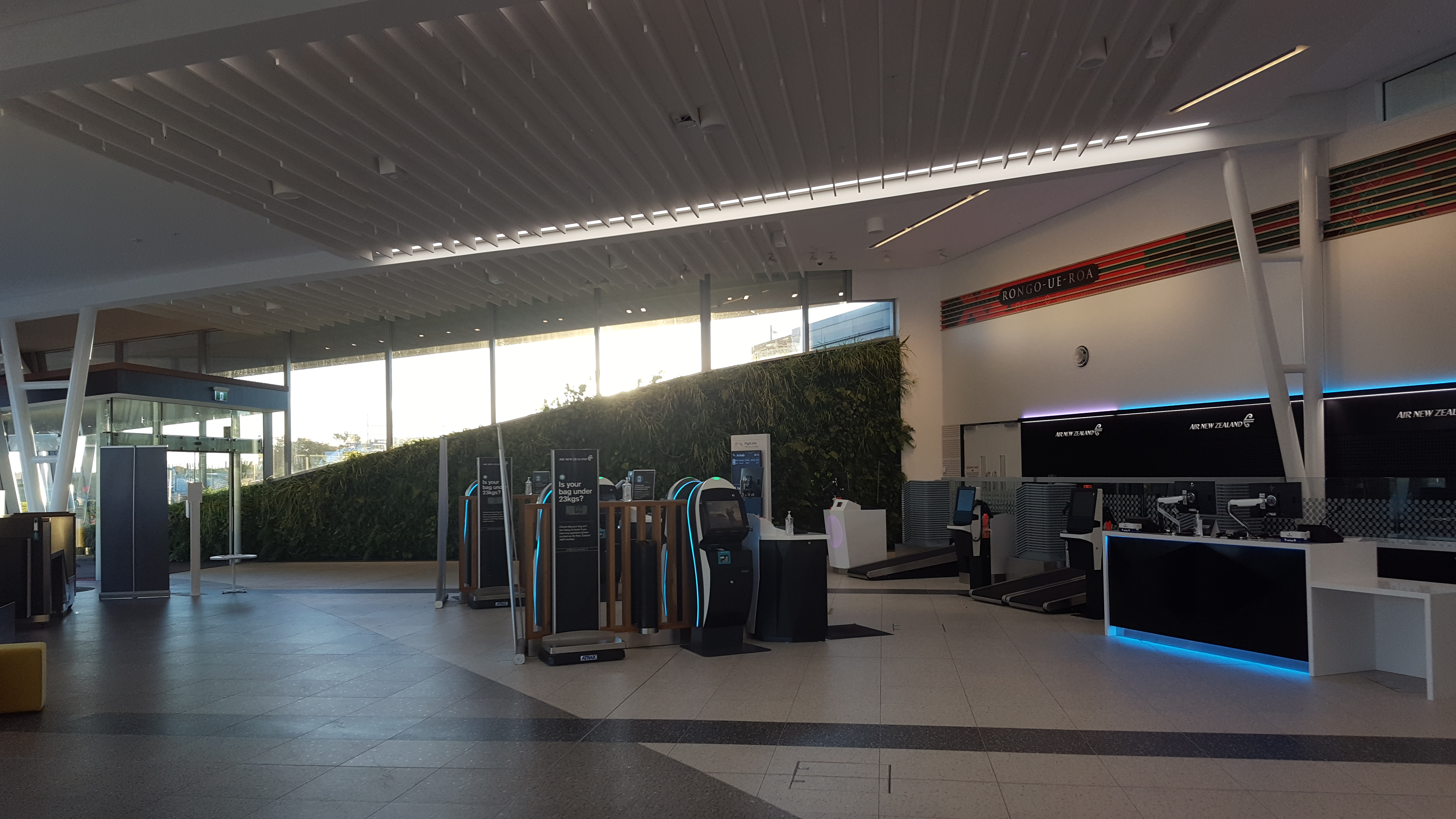
New Plymouth Airport - Check-in Area

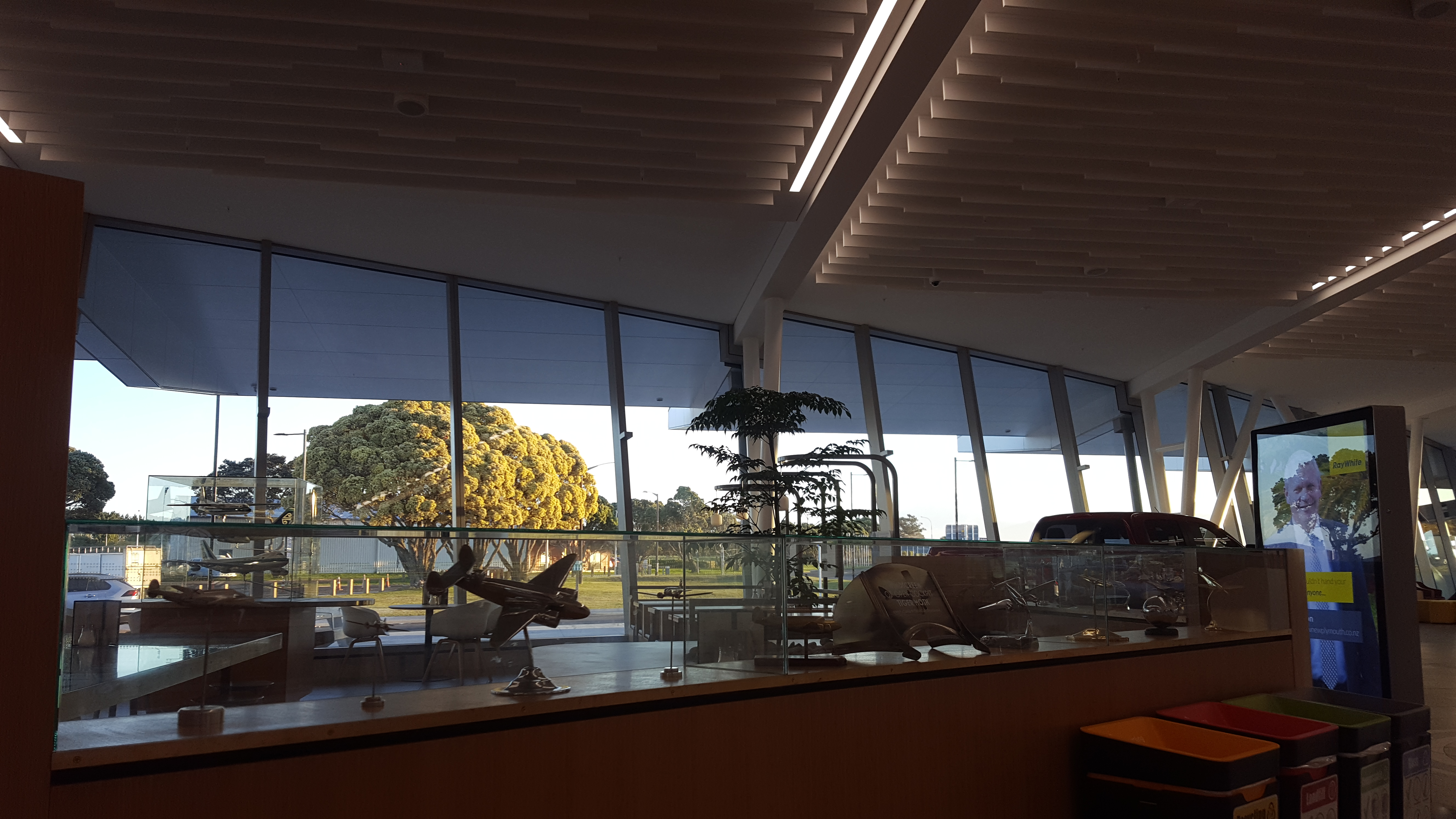
Inside New Plymouth Airport

== Airlines and destinations ==
Airlines	Destinations
Air New Zealand	Auckland, Christchurch, Wellington

== Previous Airlines ==
Origin Pacific Airways used to operate Jetstream J31, Metroliner and Jetstream 41 aircraft to/from Auckland and to/from Nelson 6x weekly. NAC used to operate from New Plymouth with a Fokker F27 service. Regional airline Sunair used to fly to New Plymouth from Hamilton. Jetstar used to fly to Auckland. While Originair used to fly to Nelson.

== Aircraft ==
(This list is approximate and may be incomplete)

- 1966–1990 Fokker F27 Friendships Mk 100 and Mk500
- 1990–2006 Fairchild-Swearingen Metroliner
- 1990–2007 Saab 340
- 1995–2005 Piper Navajo
- 2000–2006 Jetstream J31 Occasional Jetstream J41 operations.
- 2005–present Bombardier Q300
- 2012–present ATR 72
- 2017–2019 Jetstream J32

== See also ==
- List of airports in New Zealand
- List of airlines of New Zealand
- List of the busiest airports in New Zealand
- Transport in New Zealand
