= Kapiti Coast Airport =

- Aerial view of Kapiti Coast Airport looking towards Paraparaumu Beach
- IATA: PPQ; ICAO: NZPP

Summary
- Airport type: Attended, Uncontrolled, Certificated Aerodrome
- Location: Paraparaumu, Greater Wellington region
- Elevation AMSL: 7 m (23 ft)
- Coordinates: 40°54′17″S 174°59′21″E

Map
- Location of airport in the North Island

Runways
Direction	Length		Surface
Direction	m	ft	Surface
16/34	1,307	4,288	Bitumen
16G/34G	169	555	Grass
30	148	485	Grass

Kapiti Coast Airport (IATA: PPQ, ICAO: NZPP), also spelt Kāpiti Coast Airport and previously called Paraparaumu Airport, is on the Kāpiti Coast of New Zealand's North Island, between the Wellington dormitory suburbs of Paraparaumu Beach (to the west and north), Paraparaumu to the east, and Raumati Beach to the south. The Wharemauku Stream flows through part of the airport's land.

Originally government-owned, the Kapiti Coast Airport was the greater Wellington region's main airport until Wellington International Airport re-opened in 1959. It was privatised in 1995.

== History ==
Constructed by the Royal New Zealand Air Force in July 1939 using equipment from Whenuapai, Paraparaumu was made available as an "Emergency Airport" by the government. The then-grass Rongotai Airport in Wellington was closed for safety reasons from 27 September 1947 until 1959, as the surface often became unusable during winter months. National Airways Corporation was forced to move to Paraparaumu Airport, 56 kilometres (35 mi) from Wellington, causing a one-third drop in Cook Strait passengers for NAC in a single year, due to the isolation. Nonetheless, Paraparaumu was the country's busiest airport in 1949, with up to 20 DC-3s and Lodestars lined up on its apron.

The original runway dimensions were (16/34) 1350 m x 45 m with an 85 m starter extension available on runway 16, nearly touching Kapiti Road, which runs past the aerodrome. At that time, the secondary runway (11/29) was 1239 m x 30 m.

Paraparaumu was judged unsuitable for international operations in the 1950s due to Kapiti Island to the near west and the Tararua Ranges barely a mile east infringing the take-off and landing flightpaths. Housing areas were very close to the south and west of the airport, and since the mid-1980s to the north as well, directly across Kapiti Road.

New Zealand's Civil Aviation Authority has recently approved the airport after identifying approach obstruction issues. In the intervening years, aircraft performance and improvements in aircraft navigation systems render earlier concerns less critical.

From 1952 to 1957, Wellington unusually had two domestic airports: NAC running Herons from Rongotai (which CAA had agreed to reopen on strict conditions), mainly to Blenheim and Nelson, and to Rotorua via Napier, with everything else from Paraparaumu. When NAC introduced Viscounts in early 1958 they could operate to Christchurch and Auckland only, Paraparaumu's runway being about 300 m (980 ft) too short. The reconstructed and much improved Rongotai Airport opened in 1959, although its terminal remained the old Tiger Moth factory until the late 1990s. Paraparaumu ceased being Wellington's main airport and became then a general aviation airfield.

During their royal visit of New Zealand in 1953/54, Queen Elizabeth II and her husband, Prince Philip flew into the Kapiti Coast Airport as Wellington Airport was nonoperational.

The Kapiti Aero Club is based at the airport, along with other private fliers and charter businesses. Due to the relative infrequency of commercial flights, it is a popular base for private and leisure flights.

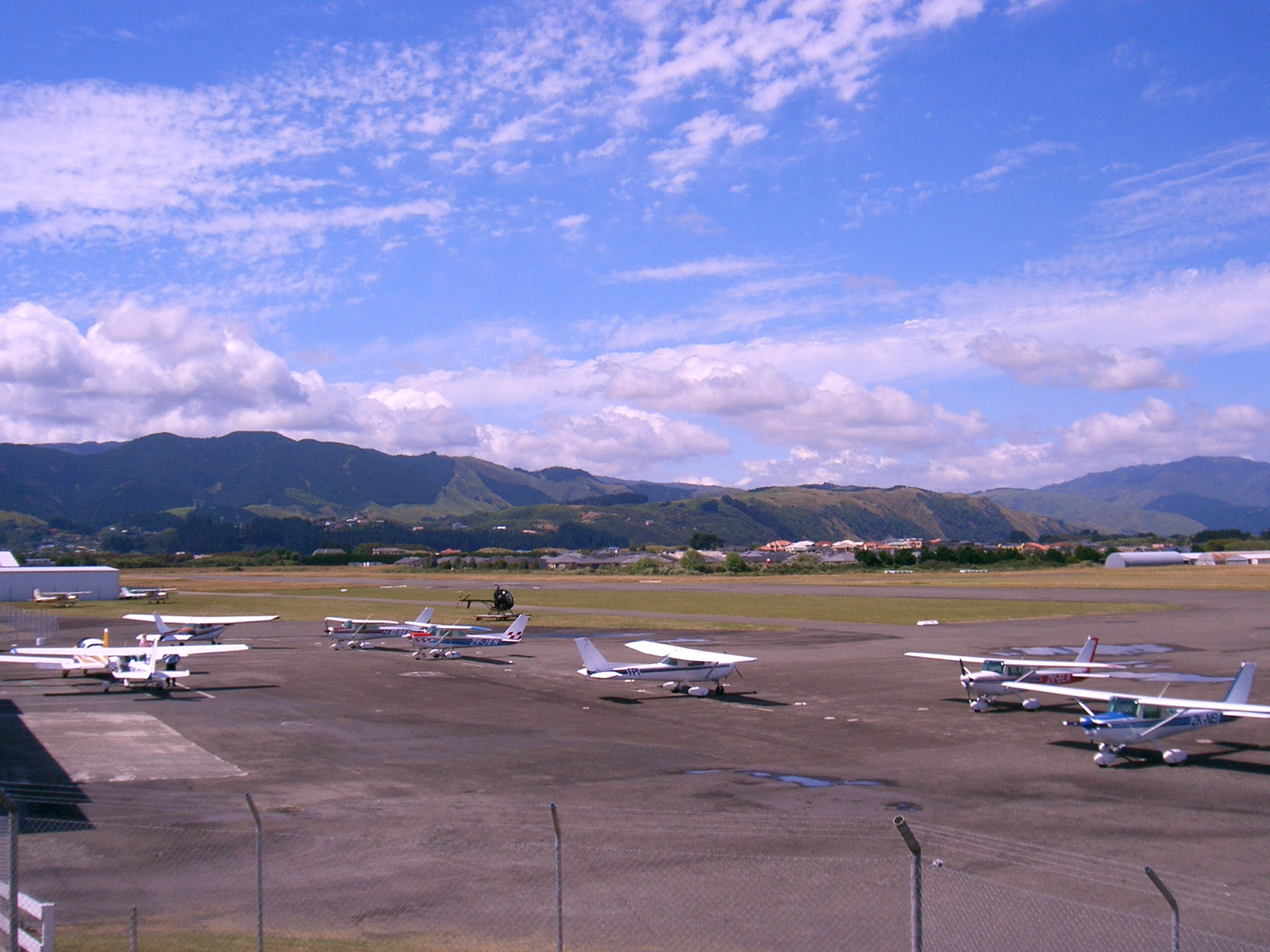
Ramp

As recently as 1992, alternative sites for a new airport for Wellington were investigated, including Paraparaumu, but a decision was made to upgrade Wellington Airport's existing site.

Interest in providing commercial flights at Paraparaumu reignited in the mid-2000s due to the rapid growth of the area. Many of Wellington's more affluent professionals and business people live at Paraparaumu and tolerate the hour-long commute for the lifestyle offered.

In early 2007, the airport was sold by its first private owners to property developer Sir Noel Robinson for NZ$40 million. Since then some of the airport's property has been sold to allow for residential development and part of the secondary runway 11/29 has been closed. In December 2019, the airport was sold to NZ based developer Templeton Group which represents NZPropCo.

Re-development proposals involve closing 11/29, with a parallel grass runway as the only crosswind runway. A new multi-user terminal is intended for the southern area. This re-development was spurred by interest from Air New Zealand to operate Q300 aircraft. Planning hearings for airport redevelopment occurred in November 2007, with redevelopment completed in 2011 with the refurbishing of the runway and recommissioning of the control tower. The rising costs of Wellington Airport also contributed to Air New Zealand's initiative to schedule flights to Paraparaumu.

On 24 October 2011, Air Nelson, a subsidiary of Air New Zealand, commenced flights between Auckland and Paraparaumu. Flights to Christchurch also operated from November 2013 but ceased in February 2016. All flights are operated with Bombardier Q300 50 seat aircraft. On 9 March 2018, Air New Zealand announced it was suspending its Kāpiti Coast to Auckland service effective 3 April 2018. This ended Air New Zealand operations on the Kāpiti Coast after seven years.

On 29 March 2018, Air Chathams expressed an interest in starting up services to Auckland from Paraparaumu with one of its Saab 340, but the aircraft has potential performance restrictions that could cause disruptions with passenger off-loading. One solution has been proposed to operate a traffic light system north of the airport on Kapiti Road to momentarily halt traffic, but only when required for maximum performance take-off. Air Chathams estimated that, on average, the lights would be required about 10 times a week.

On 2 July 2018, Air Chathams announced they would begin services to the Kāpiti Coast starting from 20 August 2018, offering 36 flights per week using the Saab 340. On 5 June 2026, Air Chathams announced that they would be suspending services to Kāpiti Coast, citing rising operational costs. The last flight took place on 31 July 2026.

In 2020 NZPropCo was considering closing the airport and rezoning its land for residential development. The local MP, Tim Costley, stated that the airport was needed as the Wellington Region's backup for Wellington Airport in the event that that airport is closed due to an event such as fog or a major earthquake. In October 2026 NZPropCo was reported to have entered an agreement to sell the airport. Both Costley and the Labour party candidate Sophie Handford have stated that they want the airport to stay open. James Meager, the Associate Minister of Transport, has also expressed a desire to keep the airport open. Costley said that he did not believe that the government should buy it. In November, Costley stated on social media that the owners were intending on closing the airport by the end of the month. In order for the land to be used for housing, it must be rezoned from an airport to a residential zone, which Costley is opposing.

== Airlines and destinations ==
=== Passenger ===
Airlines	Destinations
Sounds Air	Blenheim, Nelson

== Accidents and incidents ==
- On 18 March 1949, a Lockheed Lodestar ZK-AKX Kereru, operated by the newly formed National Airways Corporation, crashed into the Tararua Range near Waikanae, while attempting to land at Paraparaumu Airport. All 13 passengers and 2 crew were killed. The aircraft was operated by Commander R. W. Bartley and First Officer R. A. Boys, on a stopover between Whenuapai, Christchurch and Dunedin. The pilots were deemed to become disoriented in low cloud, flying under Visual Flight rules, who failed to ascertain that the aircraft was heading east towards the ranges rather than out towards sea in the direction of Kapiti Island, to prepare for an approach towards Runway 16. The crash was also attributed to a lack of navigational radio beacons in New Zealand. This crash was the worst aviation disaster in New Zealand until the Kaimai Range crash in 1963.
- In 1954 a DC-3 experienced engine failure when about to land on Runway 34, and ploughed into a house in Kohutuhutu Rd, Raumati Beach. Three children on board died in the fire that followed (there were no flight attendants on domestic flights until 1956), but the captain helped everyone else to safety. The cause of the accident was determined to be fuel exhaustion because both engines had been selected to the starboard main tank.
- On 6 November 1970, Douglas C-47B ZK-AXS of the Ministry of Transport was damaged beyond economic repair during a downwind simulated takeoff, when the undercarriage collapsed. The aircraft was operating a training flight. The fuselage was subsequently used for fire training purposes, and was last reported to be at Wellington.
- On 17 February 2008, above an adjacent hardware store, PlaceMakers, there was a triple-fatality mid-air collision between a Cessna 152 and a helicopter, both of which plummeted from approximately 1500 ft, the helicopter into the store and the plane into a nearby street. No one on the ground was injured.

== See also ==
- List of airports in New Zealand
- List of airlines of New Zealand
- Transport in New Zealand
