= Woodbourne Airport =

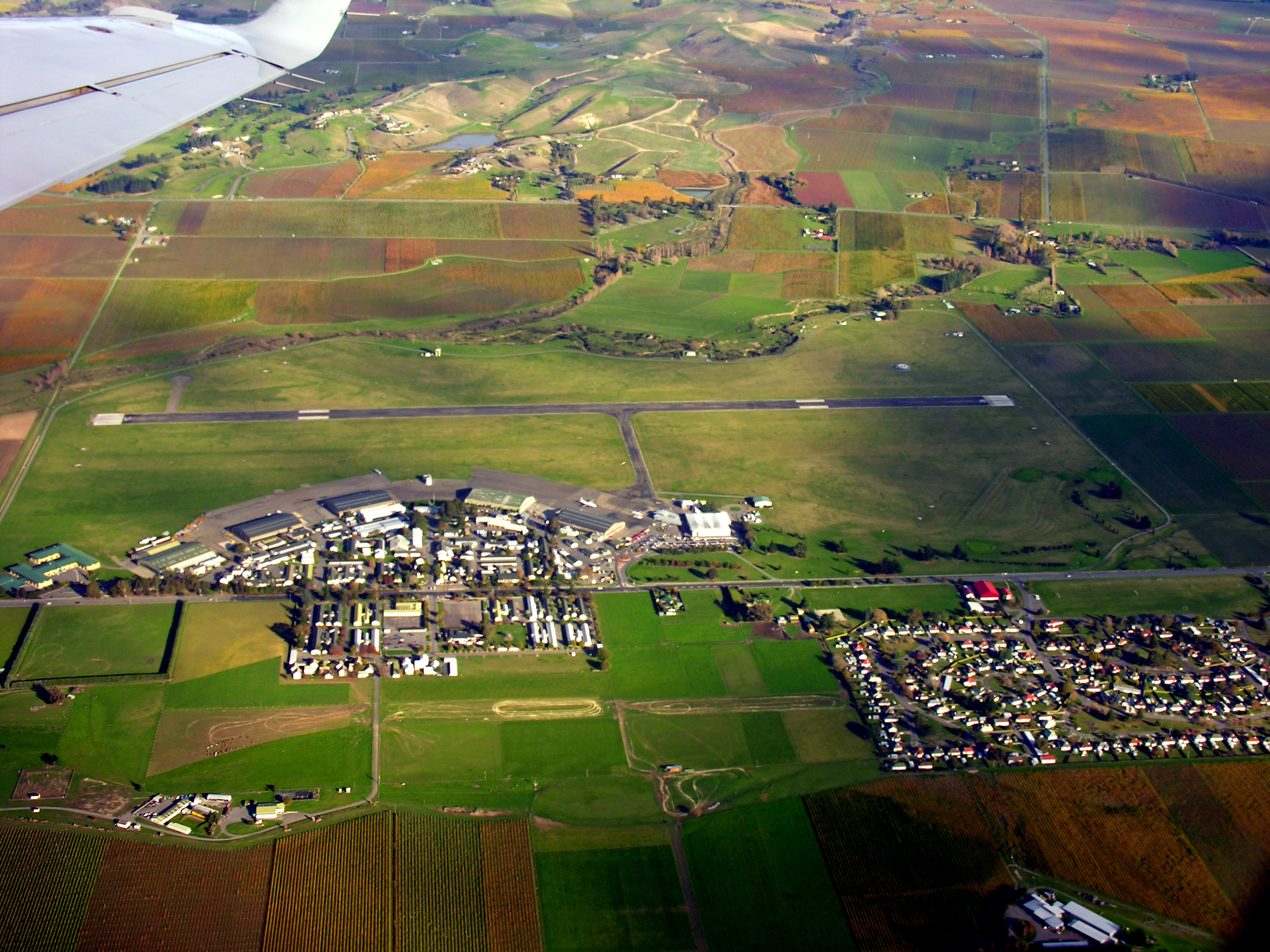
- IATA: BHE; ICAO: NZWB

Summary
- Airport type: Public and military
- Operator: Marlborough Airport Ltd
- Location: State Highway 6, Blenheim, New Zealand
- Elevation AMSL: 33 m (108 ft)
- Coordinates: 41°31′06″S 173°52′13″E
- Website: www.marlboroughairport.co.nz

Maps
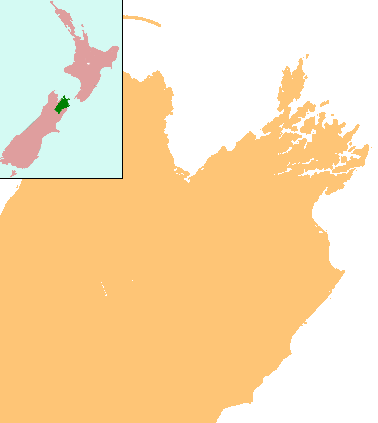
- Location of airport in Marlborough
- Map showing RNZAF Base Woodbourne in red, and Woodbourne Airport in blue

Runways
Direction	Length		Surface
Direction	m	ft	Surface
06R/24L	1,425	4,675	Bitumen
06L/24R	1,425	4,675	Grass
10/28	1,182	3,878	Grass

Statistics (2014)
- Passenger throughput: 241,173
- Landings: 9,399
- Aircraft movements (2010): 22,829

Woodbourne Airport (IATA: BHE, ICAO: NZWB) trading as Marlborough Airport is a small, controlled airport located eight kilometres (5.0 mi) west of Blenheim in the Marlborough region of New Zealand, on State Highway 6, Middle Renwick Road. It is co-located with RNZAF Base Woodbourne in the Wairau Valley on the north-eastern corner of the South Island of New Zealand. The airport has a single terminal and seven tarmac gates.

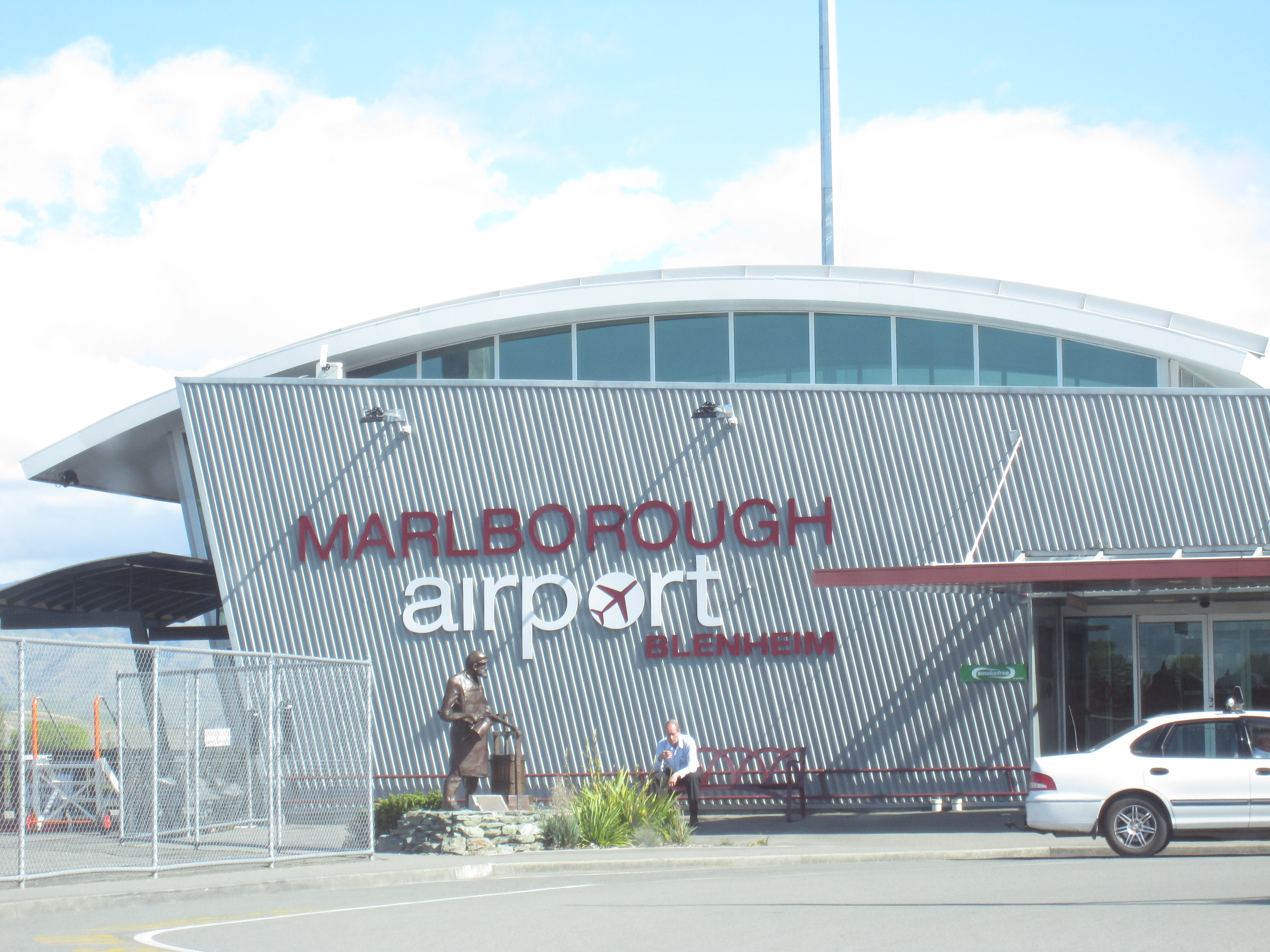
Marlborough Airport terminal building in 2012

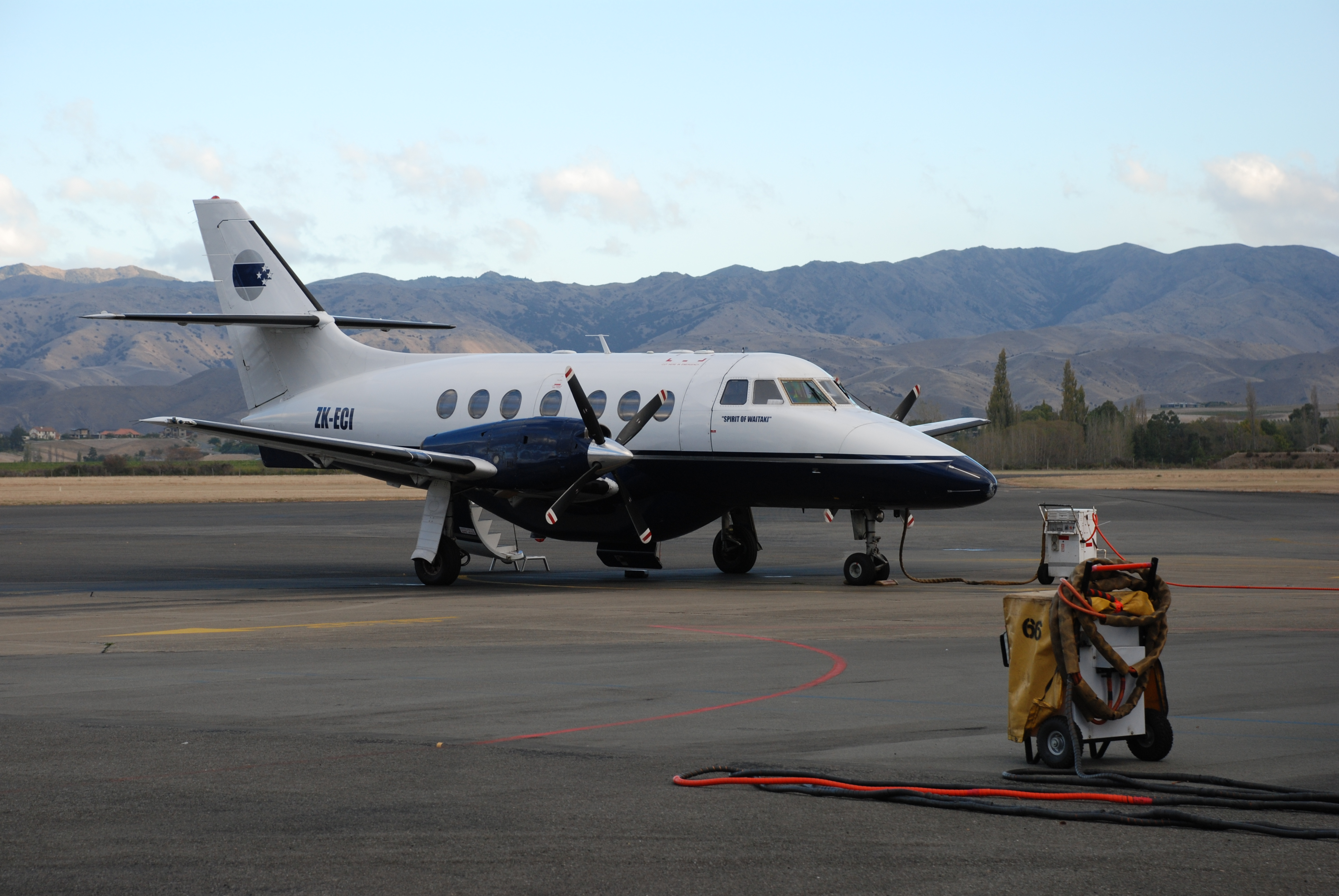
Air National Jetstream 32 on the tarmac at Blenheim

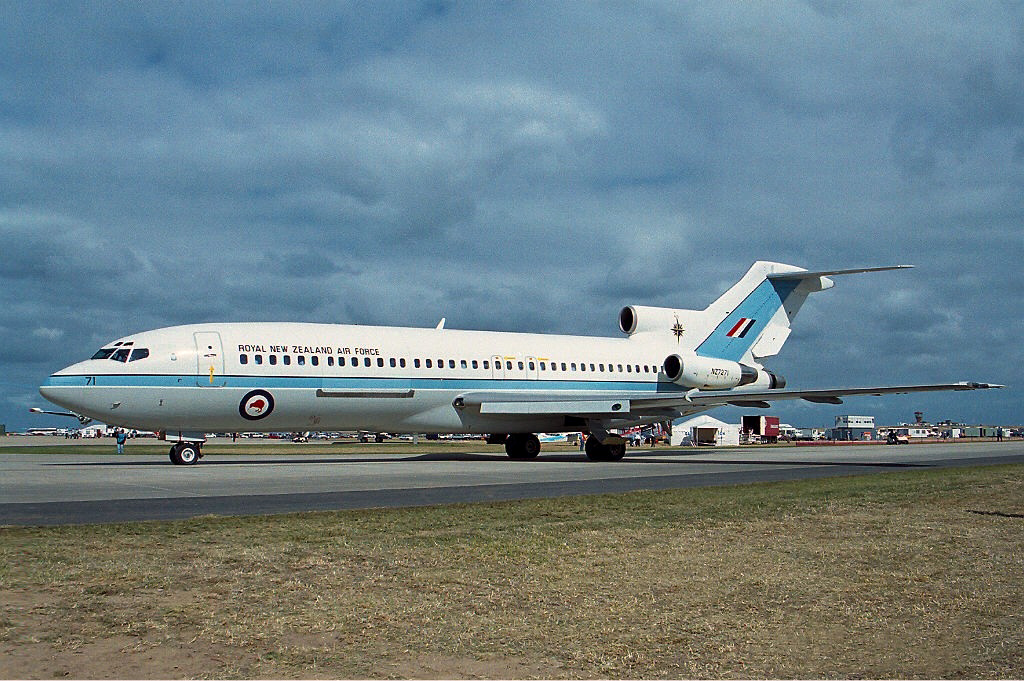
RNZAF Boeing 727-100QC seen here at Blenheim, now used as an engineering training aid

== History ==
Woodbourne was one of the first airports in New Zealand. Today it is one of the few remaining air force bases (RNZAF Base Woodbourne) with general maintenance and initial training conducted there.

It serves as the civil airport for Blenheim. Runway 06R/24L was sealed for Fokker Friendships in 1961 and was one of the first regional airports in the country to take turboprop aircraft.

Today it has more frequent operations, with Air New Zealand using Bombardier Q300 and ATR 72 aircraft from Auckland and Wellington, Air Chathams also operates from Blenheim to Auckland but only on a seasonal basis using a Saab 340 Airplane. Not only that Originair operates from Blenheim to Palmerston North and Christchurch with a BAE Jetstream 32.

The busiest route from Blenheim remains across the Cook Strait to Wellington, 80 kilometres (50 mi) to the north-east; flights take only 25 minutes. Sounds Air operates Cessna Caravan aircraft from Wellington and Kapiti Coast.

The terminal building was renovated in 2014/15 to cope with growing passenger demand and increased use by larger aircraft types. The redevelopment included an extension of the apron along with new check-in, baggage claim facilities and extension of the departure lounge.

The airport was the 12th busiest in New Zealand during 2018, based on passenger numbers.

== Airlines and destinations ==
=== Passenger ===
Airlines	Destinations
Air Chathams	Seasonal: Auckland
Air New Zealand	Auckland, Wellington
Originair	Christchurch, Nelson, Palmerston North, Wellington
Sounds Air	Kapiti Coast, Wellington

== See also ==
- List of airports in New Zealand
- List of airlines of New Zealand
- Transport in New Zealand
