= List of Air New Zealand destinations =

Destinations

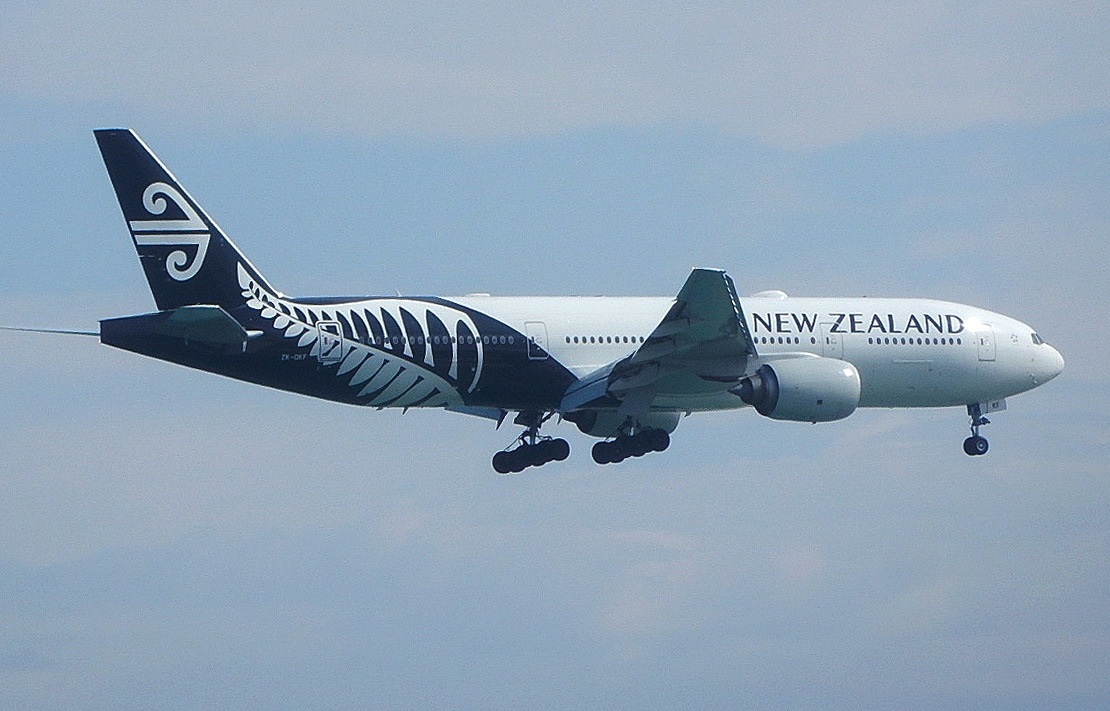
An Air New Zealand Boeing 777-200ER (ZK-OKF) at Adelaide Airport, in 2019.

This is a list of destinations served by Air New Zealand, the flagship air carrier of New Zealand. The airline serves 28 international passenger destinations in 16 countries and territories, along with 20 domestic destinations. Terminated destinations are also listed, excluding those served only by its predecessors, TEAL and NAC.

In the first quarter of 2020, the airline stopped serving many international destinations for at least three months due to the impact of COVID-19. The following is a list of Air New Zealand destinations as of March 2024:

== List ==
Country/region	City	Airport	Year started	Year ended	Notes	Refs
American Samoa	Pago Pago	Pago Pago International Airport	1973	1979	Terminated	
Argentina	Buenos Aires	Ministro Pistarini International Airport	2015	2020	Terminated	
Australia	Adelaide	Adelaide Airport	1989	Present		
Australia	Brisbane	Brisbane Airport	1959	Present		
Australia	Cairns	Cairns Airport	1988	Present	Seasonal	
Australia	Darwin	Darwin Airport	1966	1973	Terminated	
Australia	Gold Coast	Gold Coast Airport	1995	Present		
Australia	Hobart	Hobart Airport	1983; 2021	1996; Present	Seasonal	
Australia	Melbourne	Melbourne Airport	1951	Present		
Australia	Norfolk Island	Norfolk Island Airport	1947	2021	Terminated	
Australia	Perth	Perth Airport	1981	Present		
Australia	Sunshine Coast	Sunshine Coast Airport	2012	Present	Seasonal	
Australia	Sydney	Sydney Airport	1940	Present		
Australia	Sydney	Western Sydney Airport	2026	Present		
Australia	Townsville	Townsville Airport	1989	1993	Terminated	
Canada	Vancouver	Vancouver International Airport	1986; 2007	2003; Present		
China	Beijing	Beijing Capital International Airport	2008	2012	Terminated	
China	Guangzhou	Guangzhou Baiyun International Airport	2021	2023	Terminated	
China	Shanghai	Shanghai Pudong International Airport	2006	Present		
Cook Islands	Rarotonga	Rarotonga International Airport	1973	Present		
Fiji	Nadi	Nadi International Airport	1951	Present		
Fiji	Suva	Nausori International Airport	Unknown	Unknown	Terminated	
French Polynesia	Papeete	Faa'a International Airport	1951	Present		
Germany	Frankfurt	Frankfurt Airport	1987	2001	Terminated	
Hong Kong	Hong Kong	Hong Kong International Airport	1998	Present		
Hong Kong	Hong Kong	Kai Tak Airport	1966	1998	Airport closed	
Indonesia	Denpasar	Ngurah Rai International Airport	1991; 2012	1995; Present		
Japan	Fukuoka	Fukuoka Airport	2012	Unknown	Terminated	
Japan	Hiroshima	Hiroshima Airport	2012	Unknown	Terminated	
Japan	Matsuyama	Matsuyama Airport	2012	Unknown	Terminated	
Japan	Nagoya	Chubu Centrair International Airport	2012	Unknown	Terminated	
Japan	Nagoya	Komaki Airport	1991	2005	Terminated	
Japan	Okinawa	Naha Airport	2012	Unknown	Terminated	
Japan	Osaka	Kansai International Airport	1994; 2016	2013; 2020	Terminated	
Japan	Sendai	Sendai Airport	2012	Unknown	Terminated	
Japan	Shizuoka	Shizuoka Airport	2012	Unknown	Terminated	
Japan	Tokyo	Haneda Airport	2017	2018	Terminated	
Japan	Tokyo	Narita International Airport	1980	Present		
Malaysia	Kuala Lumpur	Subang International Airport	1989	1993	Terminated	
New Caledonia	Noumea	La Tontouta International Airport	1951; 2025	2024; Present		
New Zealand	Auckland	Auckland Airport	1965	Present	Hub	
New Zealand	Auckland	Whenuapai Airport	1947	1965	Terminated	
New Zealand	Blenheim	Woodbourne Airport	1947	Present		
New Zealand	Chatham Islands	Chatham Islands / Tuuta Airport	1992	1995	Terminated	
New Zealand	Christchurch	Christchurch Airport	1947	Present	Hub	
New Zealand	Dunedin	Dunedin Airport	1962	Present		
New Zealand	Gisborne	Gisborne Airport	1947	Present		
New Zealand	Greymouth	Greymouth Airport	1947	Unknown	Terminated	
New Zealand	Hamilton	Hamilton Airport	1947	Present		
New Zealand	Hokitika	Hokitika Airport	1947	Present		
New Zealand	Invercargill	Invercargill Airport	1947	Present		
New Zealand	Kaikohe	Kaikohe Aerodrome	1947	1970	Terminated	
New Zealand	Kaitaia	Kaitaia Airport	1967	2015	Terminated	
New Zealand	Kerikeri	Kerikeri Airport	1972	Present		
New Zealand	Masterton	Hood Aerodrome	2009	2014	Terminated	
New Zealand	Milford Sound	Milford Sound Airport	1970	1992	Terminated	
New Zealand	Motueka	Motueka Aerodrome	1984	Unknown	Terminated	
New Zealand	Mount Cook Village	Mount Cook Aerodrome	1966	2012	Terminated	
New Zealand	Napier	Hawke's Bay Airport	1947	Present		
New Zealand	Nelson	Nelson Airport	1947	Present		
New Zealand	New Plymouth	New Plymouth Airport	1947	Present		
New Zealand	Oamaru	Oamaru Airport	1966	2010	Terminated	
New Zealand	Palmerston North	Palmerston North Airport	1947	Present		
New Zealand	Paraparaumu	Kapiti Coast Airport	2011	2018	Terminated	
New Zealand	Queenstown	Queenstown Airport	1993	Present		
New Zealand	Rotorua	Rotorua Regional Airport	1948	Present		
New Zealand	Taupō	Taupo Airport	1966	Present		
New Zealand	Tauranga	Tauranga Airport	1947	Present		
New Zealand	Te Anau	Te Anau Airport	1966	1992	Terminated	
New Zealand	Timaru	Richard Pearse Airport	1957	Present		
New Zealand	Wānaka	Wānaka Airport	2004	2013	Terminated	
New Zealand	Wellington	Wellington International Airport	1959	Present	Hub	
New Zealand	Westport	Westport Airport	1947	2015	Terminated	
New Zealand	Whakatāne	Whakatāne Airport	1961	2015	Terminated	
New Zealand	Whanganui	Whanganui Airport	1954	2016	Terminated	
New Zealand	Whangārei	Whangarei Airport	1947	Present		
Niue	Alofi	Niue International Airport	2010	Present		
Papua New Guinea	Port Moresby	Port Moresby International Airport	1982	1985	Terminated	
Philippines	Manila	Ninoy Aquino International Airport	1966	1975	Terminated	
Samoa	Apia	Faleolo International Airport	1979	Present		
Singapore	Singapore	Changi Airport	1981; 2015	2006; Present		
Singapore	Singapore	Paya Lebar Airport	1966	1981	Terminated	
South Korea	Seoul	Gimpo International Airport	1993	1998	Terminated	
South Korea	Seoul	Incheon International Airport	2019	2025	Suspended	
Taiwan	Taipei	Taoyuan International Airport	1991; 2018	2006; Present		
Thailand	Bangkok	Don Mueang International Airport	1990	1997	Terminated	
Tonga	Nukuʻalofa	Fuaʻamotu International Airport	1951	Present		
United Kingdom	London	Gatwick Airport	1982	1994	Terminated	
United Kingdom	London	Heathrow Airport	1994	2020	Terminated	
United States	Chicago	O'Hare International Airport	2018	2024	Suspended	
United States	Dallas/Fort Worth	Dallas Fort Worth International Airport	1987	1989	Terminated	
United States	Honolulu	Daniel K. Inouye International Airport	1965	Present		
United States	Houston	George Bush Intercontinental Airport	2015	Present		
United States	Los Angeles	Los Angeles International Airport	1965	Present		
United States	New York City	John F. Kennedy International Airport	2022	Present		
United States	San Francisco	San Francisco International Airport	2004	Present		
Vanuatu	Port Vila	Bauerfield International Airport	2007	2015	Terminated	
Vietnam	Ho Chi Minh City	Tan Son Nhat International Airport	2016	2018	Terminated	
