= Eagle Airways =

Airline of New Zealand (1969–2016)

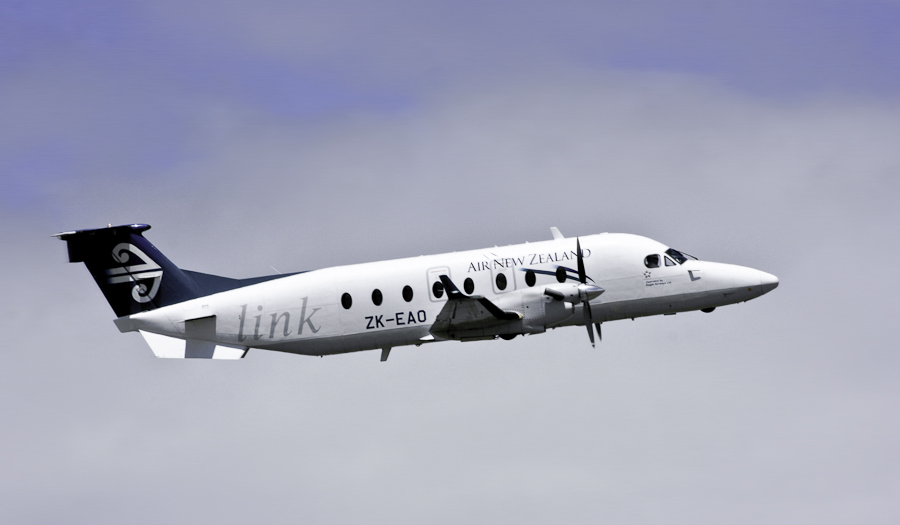
- Eagle Airways Beechcraft 1900D in 2008
IATA	ICAO	Call sign
NZ	EAG	EAGLE
- Founded: 1969
- Ceased operations: 26 August 2016
- Alliance: Star Alliance (affiliate)
- Parent company: Air New Zealand
- Headquarters: Hamilton, New Zealand
- Key people: Myles Perry (head)
- Website: www.eagleair.co.nz

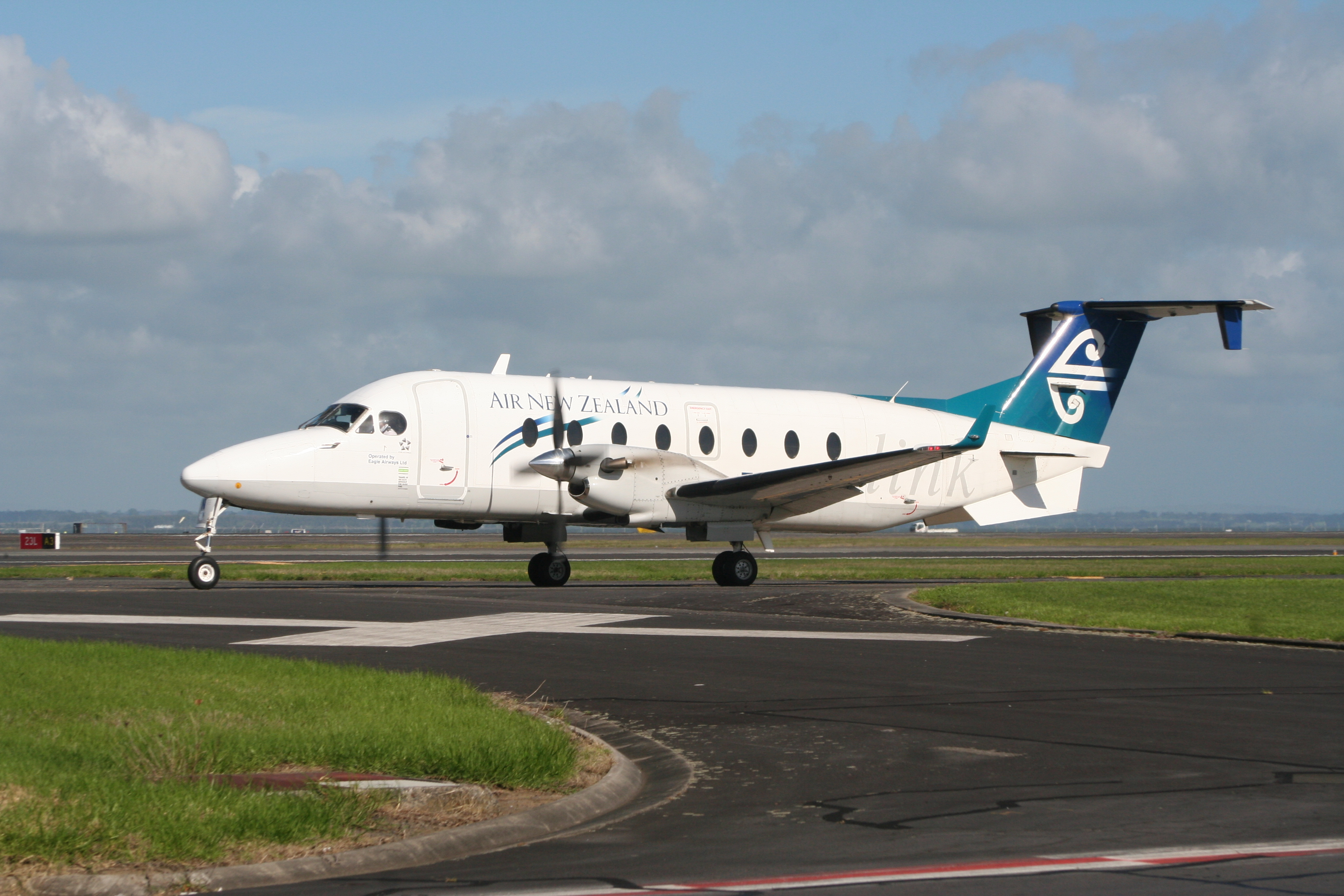
An Eagle Airways Beechcraft 1900D taxis to runway 23L at Auckland International Airport.

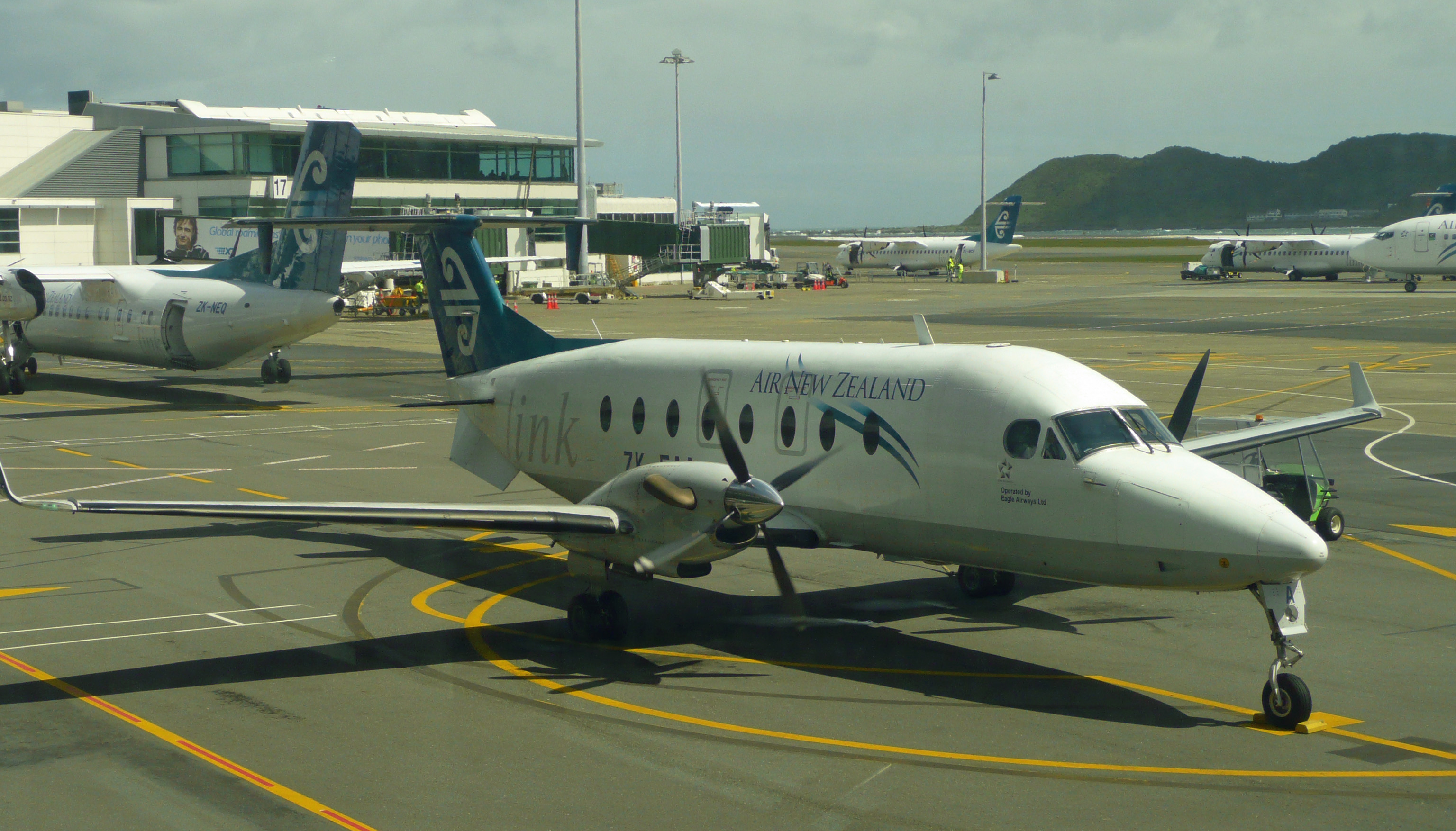
Air New Zealand Link Beechcraft 1900D at Wellington International Airport

Eagle Airways was a regional airline based in Hamilton, New Zealand and was wholly owned by Air New Zealand, operating regional services under the Air New Zealand Link brand. The airline was disbanded on 26 August 2016, with staff absorbed into Air New Zealand's other subsidiaries.

== History ==
The airline was established and started operations in 1969. It grew out of the Eagle Flying Academy owned and operated by Malcom Campbell and John Fairclough. In 1973, it became a commercial airline flying routes around the North Island of New Zealand using twin-engined Beechcraft Baron aircraft, capitalising on provincial routes not serviced by the national airline of the time, National Airways Corporation (NAC). 1976 saw the introduction of 9-seat Piper Chieftain aircraft. During 1979, Eagle moved into turbine operations with Embraer EMB 110 Bandeirante aircraft and later, Fairchild Metro aircraft.

=== Air New Zealand's 19-seat operator ===
A fleet upgrade beginning in 2001 saw the wholesale adoption of the Beechcraft 1900D Airliner 19-seat aircraft of which 16 were ordered. ZK-EAP (MSN: UE-439) was the last 1900-series aircraft to be produced by Raytheon, closing the production line in October 2002.

In 2006, route development and an increased air travel market saw the need for a 17th aircraft, and in 2007 ZK-EAQ became operational as the 17th Beech 1900D for Eagle. Wānaka was added to the network as a result.

On 22 July 2008, Eagle Airways welcomed its 18th 1900D, creating more depth to the airline's fleet. Eagle pioneered new routes with the additional aircraft, with flights between Masterton and Auckland commencing in February 2009; and service between Christchurch and Westport, launched in July 2009. Due to the continuing downturn in passenger levels, parent company Air New Zealand ceased Eagle's expansion plans. In January 2009, a 19th aircraft due to arrive towards the end of that year was announced. This aircraft was to allow a lesser reliance on charter aircraft used on some of the new pioneer routes, while allowing a 'branded' Air New Zealand aircraft to promote the airline.

=== Tough times ===
New routes, such as Christchurch – Te Anau, and Hokitika – Wellington were mooted for the airline's continued expansion plans, however the 2008 financial crisis had an effect on air travel around New Zealand. Some of the lesser-performing routes were placed under review. The Oamaru – Christchurch route and the Westport - Christchurch route was suspended as a result in late 2009. While low numbers on the Wānaka – Christchurch route resulted in services ending in January 2013. The Masterton - Auckland route was suspended in late 2013 while the Wellington to Wanganui route was also discontinued in January 2014, both routes were uneconomic for the airline.

Another pioneering route originally proposed for Eagle was Auckland – Paraparaumu, however parent company Air New Zealand handed this over to fellow subsidiary Air Nelson, as its larger aircraft were soon found to be best suited for this new service.

=== End of operations ===
On 11 November 2014, Air New Zealand announced that after a twelve-month operational performance review, all flying operations by Eagle Airways and its 19-seat fleet were to be shut down over a 20-month period beginning immediately, citing the unsustainable operating costs per seat of small aircraft and a growing demand for cheaper seats on regional services. The airline was sustaining an average loss of NZ$1 million per month on these routes. The airline planned to use the larger Q300 aircraft from Air Nelson on Eagle's more sustainable routes while dropping services to the smaller towns of Kaitaia, Westport and Whakatāne altogether, along with the Hamilton - Auckland feeder route in February 2016. Also the Wellington to Taupo and Whangarei routes were discontinued. Final services were scheduled for 26 August 2016. Smaller commuter airlines expressed interest in taking up some services that were cut. Air New Zealand also announced the purchase of a further four ATR 72-600 airliners to make up lost seat capacity.

Most staff from Eagle Airways were employed into Air New Zealand's other subsidiaries after going through the normal employment processes for Air New Zealand. Eagle Airways' engineering facilities were absorbed into Air New Zealand's regional maintenance facilities network, as they still service both Q300 and ATR fleet aircraft as required.

== Service and maintenance issues ==
A sudden surge in flight cancellations to minor centres brought the airline some negative publicity over the first few months of 2012. Airline manager Carrie Hurihanganui said sudden FAA and CAA enforced directives regarding the 1900D type have been unavoidable and the airline understands the frustrations of local communities that rely on Eagle Airways to deliver. Frequent cancellations to the town of Westport have forced the mayor of the town to formally complain to parent company, Air New Zealand, to address this issue. Other small towns such as Masterton and Wānaka have also raised concerns about rescheduling of flights without prior notice by Eagle Airways. Also public opinion believes the 1900D is now considered too unreliable as a type for the harsher New Zealand weather conditions with frequent cancellations due to maintenance issues.

The entire 1900D fleet was grounded on 7 August 2012 after hairline cracks were found in the tail area of an aircraft during routine maintenance inspection, again highlighting the unreliability of this type. This grounding caused widespread travel chaos across the smaller centres. Initially four aircraft out of the eighteen were cleared to fly, and a week later seven were still grounded. Disruption continued until 16 September. Vincent Aviation provided two Jetstream 32 airliners to Eagle Airways for the duration, a move that has helped maintain some passenger schedules.

== Fleet ==
Before it ceased operations, Eagle Airways' fleet consisted of seventeen Beechcraft 1900D aircraft.

Eagle Airways fleet
Aircraft	Introduction	Retired	Notes
Beechcraft 95-98 Baron			One aircraft
Beechcraft 1900D	2001	2016	18 aircraft
Beechcraft Queen Air Excalibur	1995		One aircraft
Cessna 172K Skyhawk	1970		One aircraft
Cessna 402B	1982		One aircraft
Embraer EMB 110 Bandeirante	1980	2002	11 aircraft
Fairchild Swearingen SA.227 Metro III	1991	2002	Six aircraft
Piper PA-39 Twin Comanche	1974		One aircraft
Piper PA-31-350 Navajo Chieftain	1976		Four aircraft
Victa Airtourer	1969		One aircraft

== Destinations ==
During its years flying, Eagle served the following destinations:

- Auckland
- Blenheim
- Christchurch
- Gisborne
- Hamilton
- Hokitika
- Invercargill
- Kaitaia
- Kerikeri
- Masterton
- Nelson
- New Plymouth
- Napier
- Oamaru
- Palmerston North
- Rotorua
- Tauranga
- Taupo
- Timaru
- Wānaka
- Wanganui
- Wellington
- Westport
- Whakatāne
- Whangārei

== Incidents and accidents ==
- On 29 March 1995, ZK-TIK, a Beechcraft Queen Air Excalibur operated by Kiwi West Aviation for Eagle Airways as Air New Zealand Link flight 2337 crashed shortly after takeoff from Hamilton Airport, killing the two pilots and four passengers on board.
- On 18 June 2007, ZK-EAK, Flight 2300, operated by Air New Zealand Link, was forced to make an emergency landing at Woodbourne Airport in Blenheim after the landing gear failed to lower. The aircraft was flying from Timaru to Wellington and landed at Woodbourne because there was less air traffic at Woodbourne. Nobody on board was injured, and the aircraft only suffered minor damage.
- On 25 September 2007, a defective undercarriage found during a routine inspection of another 1900D led to the cancellation of 60 flights the following day as the airline's entire fleet was grounded for ultrasound inspection and replacement of defective components.
- On 8 February 2008, the two pilots of Eagle Airways Flight 2279 from Blenheim to Christchurch were stabbed in a hijacking attempt. The pilots survived the attack and landed safely at Christchurch International Airport. A 33-year-old woman was arrested in the case.
- On 7 August 2012, the entire fleet was grounded again, this time over the discovery of hairline cracks in the tail area of an aircraft during a routine maintenance inspection leading to hundreds of flight cancellations.

== See also ==
- List of defunct airlines of New Zealand
