= Oamaru Airport =

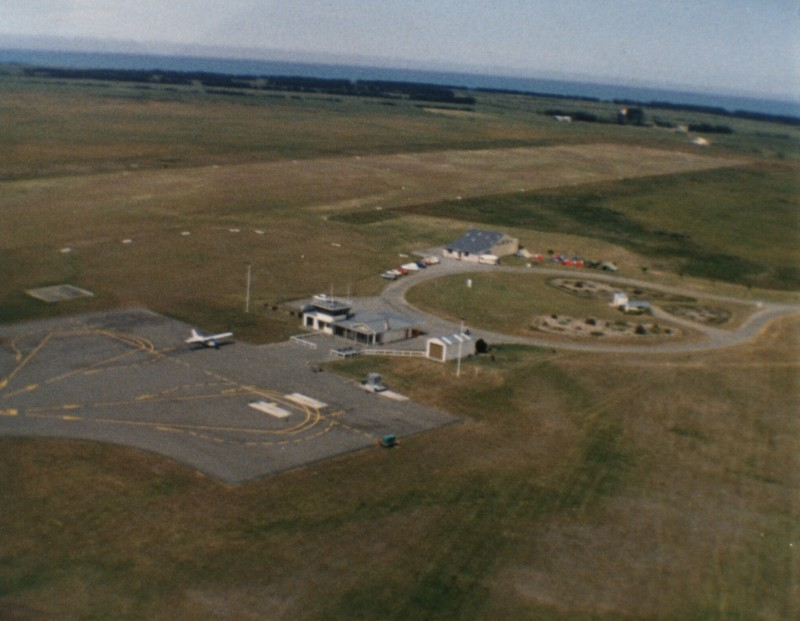
- IATA: OAM; ICAO: NZOU

Summary
- Airport type: Public
- Owner: Waitaki District Council
- Operator: New Zealand CAA
- Location: Oamaru
- Elevation AMSL: 99 ft / 30 m
- Coordinates: 44°58′12″S 171°04′54″E
- Interactive map of Oamaru Airport

Runways
Direction	Length		Surface
Direction	ft	m	Surface
18/36	4,210	1,283	Asphalt
11/29	3,107	947	Grass
02/20	2,775	846	Grass

Oamaru Airport (IATA: OAM, ICAO: NZOU) is an airport located 20 km north of Oamaru alongside State Highway 1, at Hilderthorpe in the North Otago region and the Waitaki District of New Zealand.

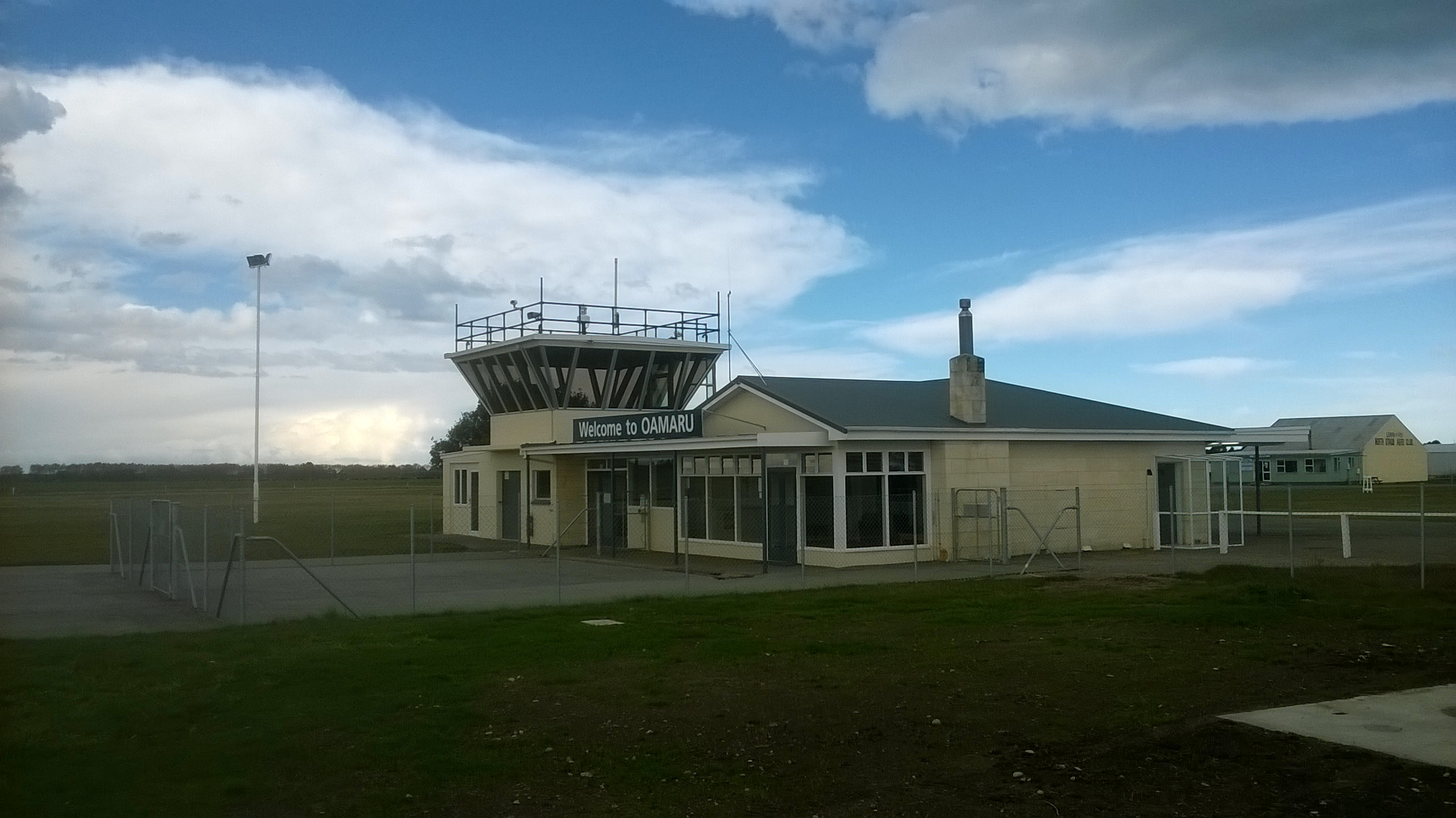
The Oamaru Airport terminal

== History ==
On 10 December 1960 South Pacific Airlines of New Zealand commenced a Douglas DC-3 service linking Oamaru north to Timaru and Christchurch and south to Alexandra and Invercargill. Later a stop in Gore was added. These flights ended on 28 February 1966. Later that day Mount Cook Airlines took over also using DC-3 aircraft, serving Timaru and Christchurch.

In October 1968 Mount Cook Airline began using the 52 seater HS-748 aircraft into Oamaru.

A new sealed runway at the Oamaru Airport was passed as fully operational in March 1975.

Regular scheduled services were withdrawn in 1989. In 2005 the Waitaki District Council decided to reseal the main runway.

When scheduled services resumed in 2006 and the first BAe Jetstream 32EP arrived from Christchurch (operated by Air National on behalf of Eagle Airways) a crowd of approximately 500 people were present to view its landing. The aircraft operating the inaugural service was renamed The Spirit of Waitaki in honour of the reintroduction of services to Oamaru. However, regular commercial flights to Oamaru were again withdrawn on 1 January 2010.

== Aero Club ==
The North Otago Aero Club has been operating from the Oamaru Airport since 1956, and operated South Island based charter flights until 2019. Currently they offer flight training towards a Private Pilots License in a Cessna 172N or can do local area based trial flights.

== Timeline of services ==
The town has been through a lot of hurdles to gain then lose its air service forcing residents to either travel south to Dunedin or north to Timaru to catch a flight.

- 1975: NAC (later Air New Zealand) begins flights to Wellington via Timaru using Fokker Friendship aircraft.
- 1 April 1990: Air New Zealand ends Fokker Friendship flights to Oamaru.
- 23 April 1990: Air Nelson takes over flights with Metroliner aircraft.
- 28 October 1991: Air Nelson ends flights and Oamaru is left without a commercial air service.
- 1991-2006: Various options explored to reinstate air service.
- 2005-2006: Waitaki District Council spends about $500,000 upgrading runway, terminal building and other facilities.
- 2006: Waitaki Mayor Alan McLay starts negotiations for a new air service.
- 20 June 2006: Eagle Airways announces a new service to Christchurch using its Beech 1900 and occasionally Air National Jetstream 32 aircraft were used.
- 7 August 2006: First Beech 1900 flight lands at Oamaru to be greeted by about 120 people.
- 18 May 2009: Eagle Airways changes schedule amid fears service is in financial trouble.
- 13 October 2009: Eagle Airways announces service will end from 1 January 2010.
- 1 January 2010: After making an announcement in October 2009, Eagle Airways withdraws service from Oamaru.
- 4 June 2014: Mainland Air commences their short lived scheduled flights to Christchurch which ended in August.

== See also ==
- List of airports in New Zealand
- List of airlines of New Zealand
- Transport in New Zealand

== Notes ==
- NZ AIP Volume 3 or 4, NZOU AD 2
