= South Pacific Airlines of New Zealand =

- Founded: 1960
- Ceased operations: 28 February 1966
- Hubs: Christchurch; Palmerston North
- Fleet size: 3
- Parent company: Ansett Transport Industries (49%); Bob Anderson; Rex Daniell

South Pacific Airlines of New Zealand was a New Zealand airline, operating between 1960 and 1966. It is regarded as a forerunner to Ansett New Zealand.

== History ==
South Pacific Airlines of New Zealand (SPANZ) was founded in 1960 by Bob Anderson and Rex Daniell, who had formerly been pilots for the National Airways Corporation, the state airline of the time. Ansett Transport Industries had a 49% shareholding. SPANZ was established in direct competition with National Airways Corporation, although the airline's policy to link larger secondary towns. The New Zealand aviation industry at the time was highly regulated in favour of the state carrier, and SPANZ struggled financially. In 1966, the airline was forced to call in the receivers, making its last commercial flight on 28 February.

== Fleet ==
SPANZ owned three Douglas DC-3s, named after New Zealanders Jean Batten, George Bolt and Ernest Rutherford. It also leased a number of other aircraft. The DC-3s were unique as they were equipped with enlarged elongated cabin windows, giving them the name "Viewmaster". They also had refurbished interiors up to the standard of more modern types then operating. This caused the National Airways Corporation to upgrade its large fleet of DC-3s.

SPANZ had wanted to operate Convair 440s cascaded from Ansett-ANA but the Civil Aviation Authority of New Zealand said that the airports to be used were substandard for the type. Just before the end, SPANZ had been given approval to operate Fokker F-27s.

== Destinations ==
SPANZ operated (or planned to operate) from most large secondary towns with either paved or compacted grass runways.

Hubs: Palmerston North, Christchurch

Destinations: Kaitaia, Auckland, Rotorua, Matamata, Hamilton, Ōpōtiki, Taupō, Gisborne, Wairoa, Napier, New Plymouth, Masterton, Wellington, Nelson, Blenheim, Hokitika, Alexandra, Christchurch, Ashburton, Timaru, Oamaru, Dunedin, Queenstown, Gore, Invercargill

== Pan Pacific airline ==
SPANZ was going to be part of Reg Ansett's dream of operating a Pan-Pacific airline using the help of US carrier Braniff Airlines in which he had holdings. During the SPANZ era, it as well as Ansett-ANA and Braniff all shared the same style of livery in anticipation of this.

In the era of heavy global regulation of air routes, this plan was not to eventuate. It was only realised when the Virgin Group expanded into Australasia with Virgin Blue in 2001 and NZ subsidiary Pacific Blue Airlines in 2004. This airline then created a seamless service in the Pacific with the creation of V Australia in 2009.

== See also ==
- List of defunct airlines of New Zealand
- History of aviation in New Zealand
