= Eagle Airways Flight 2300 =

2007 aircraft accident in New Zealand

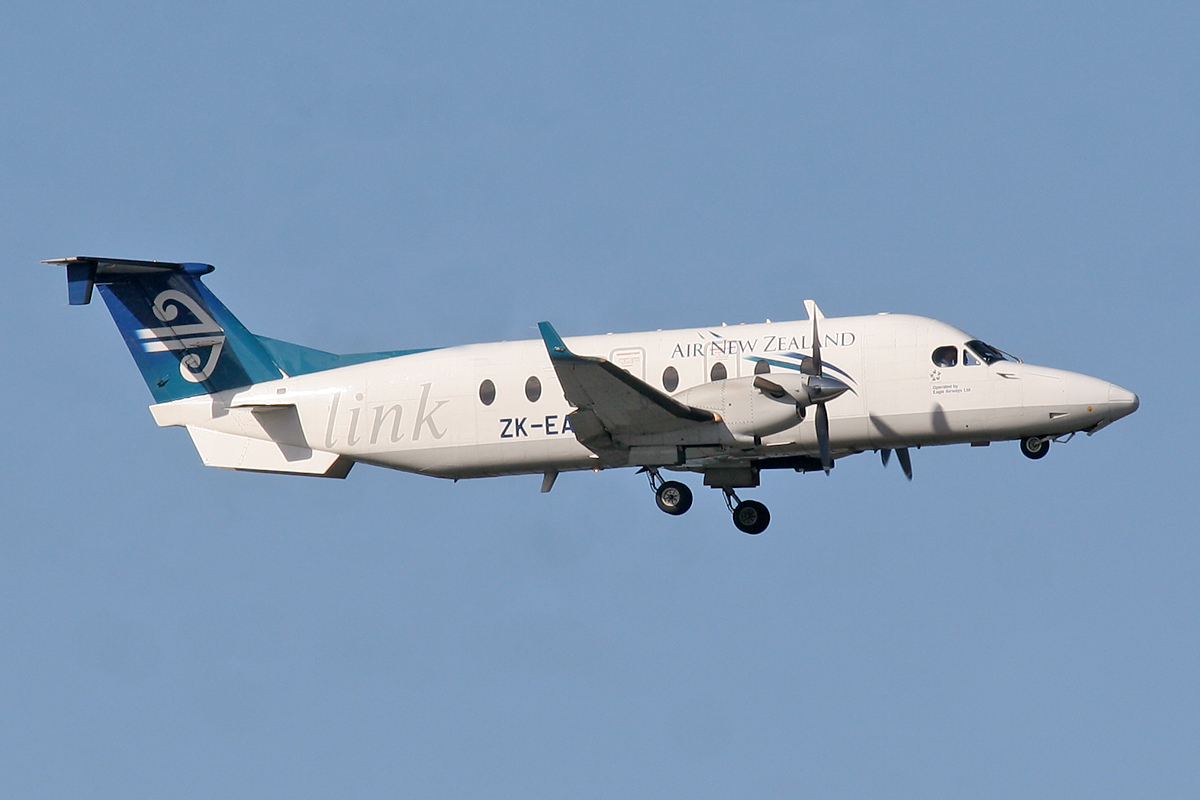
- ZK-EAK, the aircraft involved in the accident, photographed in July 2007

Accident
- Date: 18 June 2007
- Summary: Belly landing following hydraulics failure
- Site: Woodbourne Airport, Blenheim, New Zealand

Aircraft
- Aircraft type: Beechcraft 1900D
- Operator: Eagle Airways (Note: On behalf of Air New Zealand Link for Air New Zealand. (Note: Air New Zealand Link was a brand name used by Air New Zealand for regional airline flights it sold under codeshare agreements with three partner airlines including Eagle Airways. Eagle Airways was owned by Air New Zealand.))
- IATA flight No.: NZ2300
- ICAO flight No.: EAG300
- Call sign: EAGLE 300
- Registration: ZK-EAK
- Flight origin: Richard Pearse Airport, Timaru, New Zealand
- Destination: Wellington International Airport, Wellington, New Zealand
- Occupants: 17
- Passengers: 15
- Crew: 2
- Fatalities: 0
- Survivors: 17

Eagle Airways Flight 2300 (Note: Operating as Air New Zealand Flight 2300.) was a scheduled domestic passenger flight from Richard Pearse Airport (Timaru) to Wellington International Airport in New Zealand. On 18 June 2007, the Beechcraft 1900D operating the flight suffered a hydraulic failure and performed an emergency landing without its landing gear extended. All 15 passengers and two crew members survived; the aircraft sustained substantial damage, primarily to the belly, propellers, and engines.

== Aircraft ==
The aircraft involved in the accident was a five-year-old Beechcraft 1900D operated by Air New Zealand Link, registration ZK-EAK. It was manufactured in 2002 by Raytheon and was delivered new to Eagle Airways. The aircraft was equipped with two Pratt & Whitney Canada PT6A-67D turboprop engines. It was leased to Eagle Airways to operate short-haul flights for Air New Zealand, under the Air New Zealand Link regional brand.

== Crew ==
The captain was 42-year-old Myles Gousmett. He worked for Eagle Airways for almost 12 years. He has accumulated 9,776 flight hours, over 3,300 of which were on the Beechcraft 1900.

The first officer was 32 years old. He joined Eagle Airways in November 2006. He has logged 2,496 flight hours, 410 of which were on the Beechcraft 1900.

== Accident ==
Flight 2300 departed Richard Pearse Airport at 07:10 on a domestic flight to Wellington International Airport. After takeoff, the aircraft climbed to a cruise altitude of 21,000 feet, and the flight proceeded north toward Wellington without incident. At 08:12, Flight 2300 began its final approach via an ILS approach, and the pilots began configuring the aircraft for landing.

The first officer extended the flaps, and upon reaching the glideslope, moved the landing gear lever to the down position; however, the gear failed to extend. The first officer returned the lever to the "up" position and, at 08:15, informed air traffic control (ATC) of the landing gear issue and initiated a go-around. The aircraft climbed above the clouds and leveled off at 6,000 feet. ATC provided radar vectors to circle west of Wellington.

The pilots attempted to lower the gear a second time, but it again failed to respond. They checked the electrical panels and circuit breakers but found no faults. The crew decided to relocate to an area clear of clouds and traffic to conduct a full failure analysis. Knowing that the weather around Woodbourne was clear, the first officer obtained clearance to descend in that direction. The captain informed the passengers of the situation and his intention to divert to Woodbourne Airport to enter a holding pattern.

While holding over Woodbourne, the pilots followed the Quick Reference Handbook (QRH) procedures for manual landing gear extension. Control was transferred to the first officer so the captain could operate the manual pump. The captain reported that the pump handle lacked the resistance and pressure typically expected. After several unsuccessful attempts, he secured the handle and resumed control of the aircraft.

The first officer contacted the airline's maintenance center at Woodbourne to report the situation and notified the airport controller. The controller confirmed that a full emergency response had been activated for the emergency landing. The pilots repeated the manual extension procedures, but the gear remained retracted. Maintenance personnel suggested isolating the electrical power to the landing gear motor, but this also failed to resolve the issue. Having exhausted all options, the pilots prepared for a belly landing at Woodbourne. The first officer left his seat to brief the passengers individually on the landing and evacuation procedures. He secured the cabin and moved all carry-on luggage to the first row of seats.

The pilots set the flaps to 17º and positioned the aircraft for landing on Runway 24. At approximately 09:02, the controller confirmed emergency services were in place and cleared the aircraft for landing. At 09:07, the aircraft touched down on the runway. The first officer began shutting down the engines while the captain maintained directional control. The aircraft took nearly 15 seconds to come to a stop. Once stationary, the pilots completed the evacuation and shutdown checklists, and all passengers evacuated safely through the four exits.

== Investigation ==
The Transport Accident Investigation Commission (TAIC) was responsible for investigating the accident. The TAIC's final report concluded that a metal fatigue crack in the landing gear actuator had developed over time (estimated at some 11,900 flight cycles) and reached a critical size during the flight to Wellington. The crack allowed hydraulic fluid to escape overboard and, because of the landing gear system design, the crew was unable to lower the gear by any means.

== In popular culture ==
The crash was featured in season 26, episode 4 of the Canadian documentary series Mayday, also known as Air Crash Investigation, titled "Crash Landing".

== See also ==
- LOT Polish Airlines Flight 16, a similar incident involving a landing gear malfunction and a subsequent belly landing
