= Air New Zealand Link =

Regional airline of New Zealand (1991–2019)

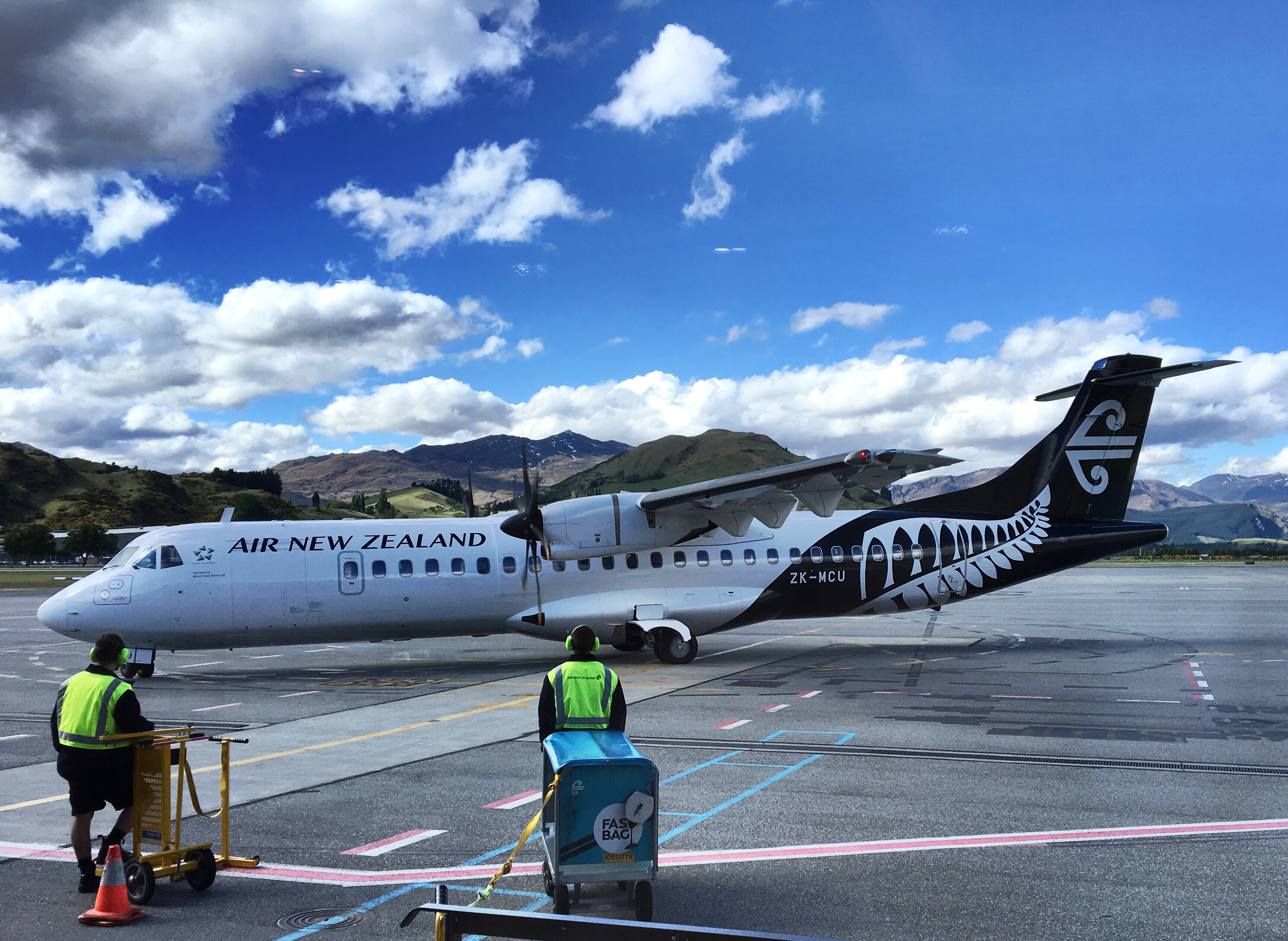
- Air New Zealand Link ATR 72-500 in 2015, operated by Mount Cook Airlines
IATA	ICAO	Call sign
NZ; NZ; NM	EAG; RLK; NZM	EAGLE; LINK; MOUNTCOOK
- Founded: 1991
- Ceased operations: 9 December 2019
- Hubs: Auckland; Christchurch; Wellington
- Frequent-flyer program: Airpoints
- Alliance: Star Alliance (affiliate; 1999–2019)
- Fleet size: 52
- Destinations: 20
- Parent company: Air New Zealand
- Headquarters: Wynyard Quarter, Auckland
- Key people: Jeff McDowall; Carrie Hurihanganui; John Hambleton
- Website: www.airnewzealand.co.nz

Air New Zealand Link was a brand name under which Air New Zealand's subsidiary regional airlines operated flights. The airlines were Mount Cook Airline, Air Nelson and Eagle Airways. They primarily connected regional centres with New Zealand's three main international airports, Auckland Airport, Wellington Airport, and Christchurch Airport. The regional airlines have since been combined with their parent Air New Zealand.

== History ==
Air New Zealand Link was formed as the brand name for regional services in 1991, covering the three airlines Air New Zealand had purchased interests in: Eagle Airways, Mount Cook Airline and Air Nelson. The three airlines were purchased as Air New Zealand found it not viable to operate its own regional services due to the introduction of new competition, Ansett New Zealand.

The airlines were purchased as below:

- Mount Cook Airline: Initial stake purchased by NAC in 1973, increased to 30% on 5 December 1983, 77% in October 1985, and 100% on 18 April 1991. Its operations ended in 2019.
- Air Nelson: 50% stake purchased by Air New Zealand in October 1988, increased to 100% in 1995. Its operations ended in 2019.
- Eagle Airways: 50% stake purchased by Air New Zealand in October 1988, which increased to 100% in 1995. Its operations ended in 2016.

== Fleet ==
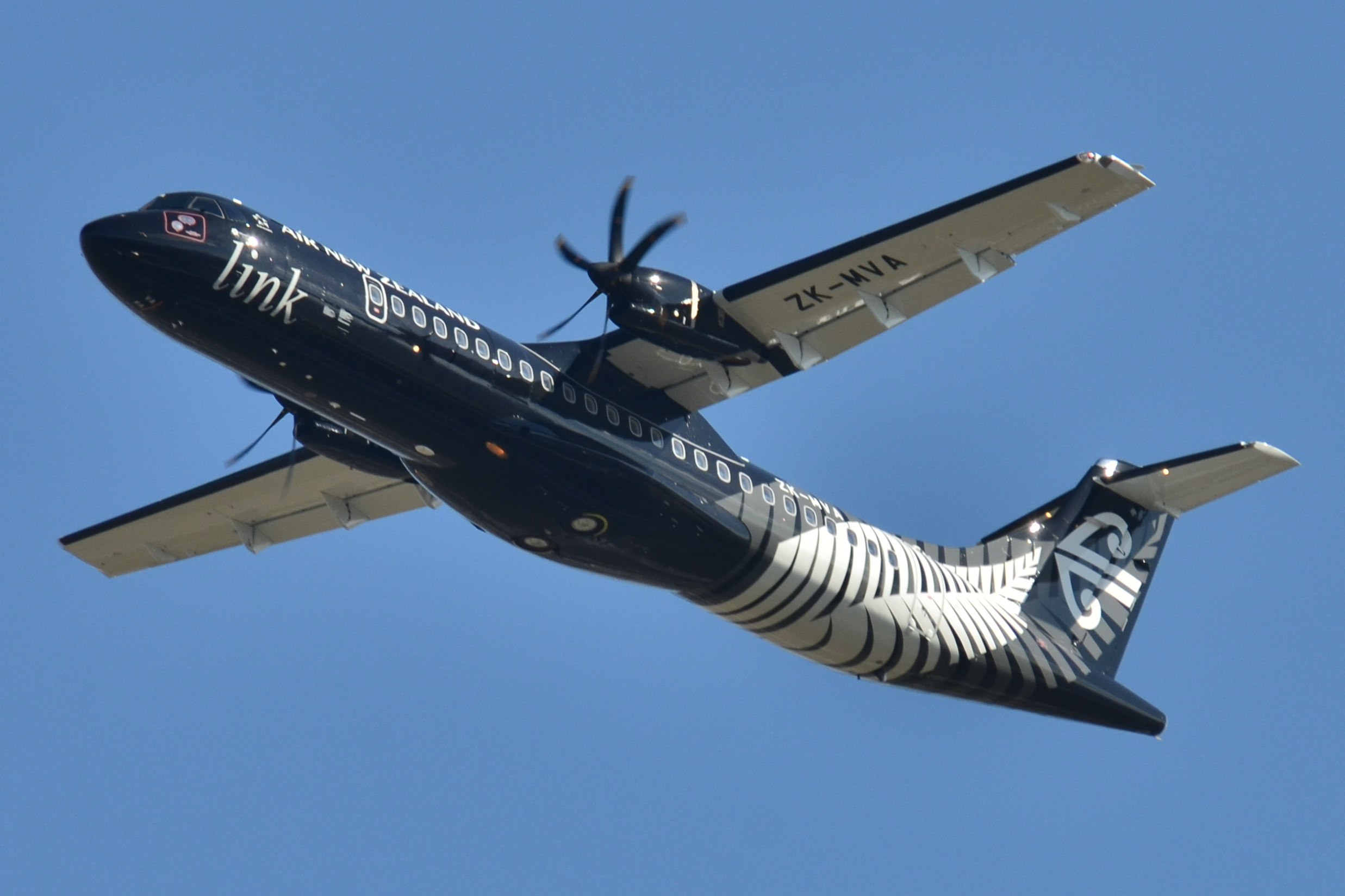
Air NZ Link ATR 72-600

As of 30 April 2019 the Air New Zealand Link carriers operated the following aircraft.

Airline	Aircraft	Number in service	Orders	Passenger seats	Notes
Air Nelson	De Havilland Canada Dash 8-300	23	-	50	
Mount Cook Airline	ATR 72-500	7	-	68	
Mount Cook Airline	ATR 72-600	22	7	68	
Total		52	7		

== Destinations ==
As of June 2019 Air New Zealand Link flies to the following destinations.

City	IATA	ICAO	Airport	Mt Cook	Nelson
Auckland	AKL	NZAA	Auckland Airport	Yes	Yes
Blenheim	BHE	NZWB	Woodbourne Airport		Yes
Christchurch	CHC	NZCH	Christchurch Airport	Yes	Yes
Dunedin	DUD	NZDN	Dunedin Airport	Yes	Yes
Gisborne	GIS	NZGS	Gisborne Airport		Yes
Hamilton	HLZ	NZHN	Hamilton Airport	Yes	Yes
Hokitika	HKK	NZHK	Hokitika Airport		Yes
Invercargill	IVC	NZNV	Invercargill Airport	Yes	Yes
Kerikeri	KKE	NZKK	Kerikeri Airport		Yes
Napier	NPE	NZNR	Hawke's Bay Airport	Yes	Yes
Nelson	NSN	NZNS	Nelson Airport	Yes	Yes
New Plymouth	NPL	NZNP	New Plymouth Airport	Yes	Yes
Palmerston North	PMR	NZPM	Palmerston North Airport	Yes	Yes
Queenstown	ZQN	NZQN	Queenstown Airport	Yes	
Rotorua	ROT	NZRO	Rotorua Regional Airport	Yes	Yes
Taupō	TUO	NZAP	Taupo Airport		Yes
Tauranga	TRG	NZTG	Tauranga Airport	Yes	Yes
Timaru	TIU	NZTU	Richard Pearse Airport		Yes
Wellington	WLG	NZWN	Wellington Airport	Yes	Yes
Whangārei	WRE	NZWR	Whangarei Airport		Yes

== Accidents and incidents ==
- On 29 March 1995, Eagle Airways Flight 2337, a Beechcraft Queen Air Excalibu from Hamilton to New Plymouth, crashed shortly after takeoff after both engines failed, killing all six people onboard. The flight was operated by Kiwi West Aviation on contract to Eagle Airways for Air New Zealand.
- On 18 June 2007, Eagle Airways Flight 2300, a Beechcraft 1900D from Timaru to Wellington registered ZK-EAK, suffered a landing gear failure, and belly landed at Woodbourne Airport in Blenheim. The aircraft was substantially damaged, but all 17 occupants survived.
- On 8 February 2008, a woman attempted to hijack Eagle Airways Flight 2279, a British Aerospace Jetstream from Blenheim to Christchurch. The woman said she had a bomb on board. Both pilots and one passenger suffered stab injuries. The aircraft landed safely and the woman was arrested. There were no injuries to the other passengers on board.
