= Eagle Airways Flight 2279 =

2008 attempted aircraft hijacking

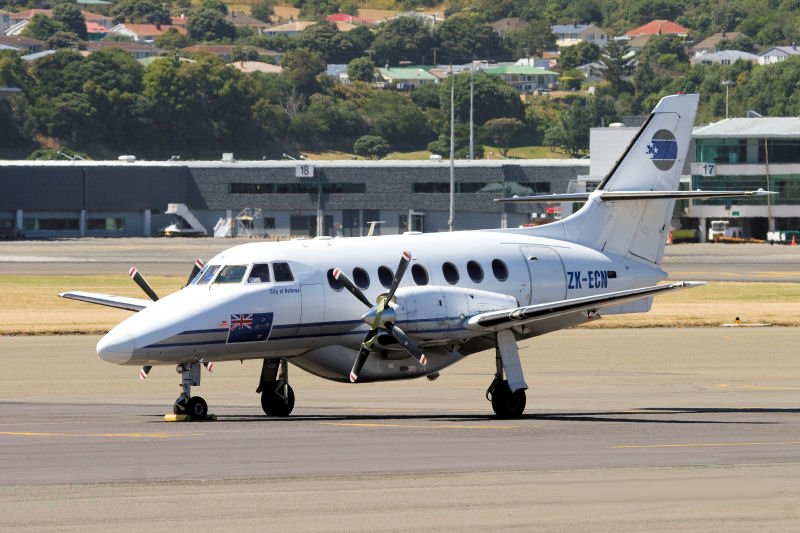
- ZK-ECN, the aircraft involved in the hijacking

Hijacking
- Date: 8 February 2008
- Summary: Attempted hijacking
- Site: Christchurch International Airport, Christchurch, New Zealand

Aircraft
- Aircraft type: British Aerospace Jetstream
- Aircraft name: City of Rotorua
- Operator: Air National on behalf of Eagle Airways for Air New Zealand Link
- Registration: ZK-ECN
- Flight origin: Woodbourne Airport, Blenheim, New Zealand
- Destination: Christchurch International Airport, Christchurch, New Zealand
- Occupants: 9
- Passengers: 7 (including hijacker)
- Crew: 2
- Fatalities: 0
- Injuries: 3
- Survivors: 9

Eagle Airways Flight 2279 was a commuter flight operated by Air National on behalf of Eagle Airways. The flight was the subject of an unsuccessful hijack attempt on 8 February 2008 during which both pilots and a passenger suffered knife wounds.

== Incident ==
Ten minutes after takeoff from Woodbourne Airport in Blenheim, at about 7:40 a.m. (NZDT), Asha Ali Abdille attacked both of the pilots and demanded the plane be flown to Australia. One pilot was cut in the arm, the other in the leg. Abdille also tried to wrestle the controls from the pilot. There were six other passengers (four New Zealanders, one Australian and one Indian) on board. One female passenger was also injured. The copilot managed to restrain Abdille eventually. Abdille also claimed to have two bombs on board, but no explosives were found. The plane landed safely at Christchurch International Airport at 8:06 a.m.

== Hijacker ==
Asha Ali Abdille, a 33-year-old living in Blenheim, New Zealand, originally a refugee from Somalia, was arrested after the plane landed.

There were fears among the New Zealand Somali community that they would be branded terrorists. The government quickly stated "the government will not tolerate any racial or religious intolerance".

Abdille moved to New Zealand in 1994. TVNZ did an interview with her in 1996, during which she said she was not coping with New Zealand society, and would like to go back to Somalia.

On 1 March 2005, the then-Immigration Minister Paul Swain was questioned in Parliament regarding unrelated incidents whether he was confident that Abdille "is not a threat to the New Zealand community". The minister answered in the affirmative.

== Trial ==
Abdille was charged with one count of attempted hijacking, one count of wounding one of the pilots with intent to cause grievous bodily harm and two counts of injuring with intent. She was remanded for a psychiatric report.

On 22 February 2008, Abdille was charged in the Christchurch District Court with a further 11 charges, including threatening to kill, possessing an offensive weapon, and taking a dangerous weapon onto an aircraft. At her trial in 2010 where she was represented by prominent human rights and criminal barrister Antony Shaw, Abdille pleaded guilty to the charge of attempting to hijack an aircraft, and was sentenced to 9 years in jail.

As of 2020 Abdille was compulsorily being held in virtual isolation in a forensic mental health DHB facility after completing her full sentence of 9 years in jail.

== Impact ==
Christchurch International Airport was evacuated after the incident. Among those caught up were Transport Minister Annette King, Transport Safety Minister Harry Duynhoven and the England Cricket Team. This incident prompted a review of aviation security in New Zealand. Released on 23 April 2009, it found domestic flights of fewer than 90 seats with unscreened passengers and carry-on baggage were a high-risk situation. As of 2022, there has been no change and domestic flights of fewer than 90 seats continue to be unscreened.
