= Antony Shaw =

Barrister of the High Court of New Zealand

Antony "Tony" Shaw is a barrister of the High Court of New Zealand, and a former lecturer of law at Victoria University Wellington. He holds an LLB and Bachelor of Arts (BA) from Auckland University. His practice covers civil and criminal matters. He is regarded as an expert on human rights law. Shaw has appeared widely in the District and High Courts of New Zealand, including appeals to the Court of Appeal, the Privy Council and the New Zealand Supreme Court. Shaw has also appeared in the Employment Court of New Zealand and regularly appears before the New Zealand Parole Board.

== Career ==
Shaw is one of five barristers who between 1848 and 2014 successfully argued a case before the Privy Council in relation to a New Zealand criminal matter. See (R v Taito - Privy Council 2002). The Supreme Court replaced the Privy Council as the final appellate body in 2004.

Shaw and Greg King were the first lawyers to win a criminal case before the Supreme Court of New Zealand. See (Timoti v Queen - SC 2005).

=== Notable cases ===
In 2010, Shaw represented flag burner Valerie Morse in the Supreme Court, where her conviction for disorderly behavior was quashed. In the same year Shaw represented one of Waihopai Station. They were acquitted at their trial despite admitting to having broken into the spy base.

Shaw also represented airline hijacker Asha Ali Abdille, who pleaded guilty to hijacking Eagle Airways Flight 2279.

In 2008, Shaw represented Alan Duff, who was acquitted of failing to remain with a police officer when he was pulled over for speeding, and in 2005, farmer Paul McIntyre, who was acquitted of illegally firing a firearm at thieves. Shaw also represented the plaintiff in the "Baigents Case" that created a new cause of action for monetary compensation following breaches of the Bill of Rights.

In 2023, Shaw and Robert Lithgow and Shaw successfully argued an appeal in the Supreme Court that resulted in the quashing of a rape conviction that carried a 16.5 year sentence.

Shaw represented Waikato man Gordon Rippey in a successful appeal to the Supreme Court, which quashed the Rippey's convictions on the basis there was a miscarriage of justice. The trial judge had refused warn the jury about the reliability of people's memories 16 years before the trial. Lithgow and Shaw noted in their submissions to the Supreme Court: "This Court's decision must recognize that a complainant or witness may honestly recall a false memory and/or that memories change over time and can be distorted by reinterpretation over time". The District Court at Hamilton dismissed the charges against Rippey, noting the complainant had decided she did not want to again give evidence. Rippey had spent six-and-a-half years in prison before he was acquitted.

==== Ministry of Transport v Noort - Court of Appeal 1991 ====
In 1991, Shaw represented a Mr. Noort in the Court of Appeal, Ministry of Transport v Noort (1992). Noort had been stopped by the Ministry of Transport and voluntarily submitted to an Alcohol Breath Test which showed he was in excess of the requisite level. Noort was not given the opportunity to consult a lawyer. The Court of Appeal found this had breached Noort's rights. The court determined that when a court finds that evidence was obtained through a breach of someone's rights, prima facie the remedy was exclusion of that evidence. Accordingly, the evidence of the excess Breath Alcohol Test was thrown out and Noort was acquitted. This benchmark case, led by Shaw, changed the way the police (then the Ministry of Transport) dealt with alleged offenders and created the necessity for an alleged offender to be told they had a right to consult a lawyer. It also confirmed the position that the New Zealand Bill of Rights (1990) took precedence over any other enactment, and that evidence obtained in breach of someone's rights ought to be thrown out. This case is extensively referred to in cases and texts, including references created by the New Zealand Law Commission and numerous decisions of the Courts of New Zealand.

==== R v Goodwin (No.2) - Court of Appeal 1993 ====
In 1993, Shaw and Michael Bungay represented the appellant Goodwin in a Court of Appeal case known as R v Goodwin (No.2), which is now regarded by the New Zealand Justice Department as the leading case in relation to the rights of persons arrested, pursuant to the New Zealand Bill of Rights. It is referred to in numerous decisions and law texts in New Zealand and overseas including Cambridge University’s Constitutional Law in the United Kingdom – Practice and Principles. The decision of Goodwin set forth the correct procedure for legal representation, and the effect of improper procedure on evidence and conviction.

==== Simpson v The Attorney General (also known as the Baigents case) - Court of Appeal 1994 ====
In 1994, Shaw represented one plaintiff, Simpson, in Simpson v Attorney-General [1994] 3 NZLR 667. which is also known as "The Baigents case". The plaintiffs alleged police officers had in bad faith persisted with the search of a property owned by a Mrs. Baigent, which they knew had been mistakenly named in a search warrant that had been issued for a drug dealers' house. The plaintiffs sued on the grounds the police breached the Bill of Rights Act, the right to be secure against unreasonable search and arrest. The Court of Appeal found that whilst the Bill of Rights did not specify remedies for a breach of a section of the Act, it has to be read in conjunction with New Zealand's obligations under the International Covenant on Civil and Political Rights. This decision created a new law, a civil cause of action (claim for monetary compensation) when someone's rights were breached.

==== R v Taito - Privy Council 2002 ====
In 2002, at the Privy Council, Shaw and Tony Ellis represented 12 clients who had been convicted of criminal offences (R v Taito [2002] 3 NZLR 577, 6 HRNZ 539 (Privy Council 2002). The Privy Council found for Shaw and Ellis's clients, and struck down the way the New Zealand Court of Appeal was dealing with criminal appeals in which legal aid was refused. The Privy Council ordered new appeals for the 12 with an order that their clients be granted appeals and that they be legally aided. The New Zealand Herald reported Member of Parliament Wayne Mapp, who was also a former associate professor of law, said: “the decision was a 'clear warning shot"' to the government. "This is the Privy Council saying that the criminal appeals system operated by the Court of Appeal was 'unlawful'," he said. The Privy Council since 1848 has only granted leave to hear eight New Zealand criminal appeals. Shaw became one of five barristers who have successfully argued a New Zealand criminal matter before the Privy Council.

==== Timoti v Queen - Supreme Court 2005 ====
In 2005, Shaw, Greg King and Catherine Milnes successfully appealed in the Supreme Court the 1999 Murder conviction of Aerengaroa Timoti. Timoti was 23 when he was convicted of murder for setting fire to his mother's house while five people were inside, for which he was serving a life sentence. The appeal focused on the partial defence of provocation relating to a dispute between Timoti and his father. The Supreme Court held that Timoti was provoked "sufficient to deprive a person having the power of self-control of an ordinary person, but otherwise having the characteristics of the accused ...", therefore a properly directed Jury might have found Timoti guilty of the lesser charge of manslaughter, which was not available or presented to the Jury as an option in 1999. Timoti's conviction was quashed and a new trial was ordered. It was the first successful criminal appeal to the newly formed Supreme Court of New Zealand.

==== R v McIntyre (Far North Farmer Shoots Thieves) - District Court 2005 ====
In 2005, Judge Michael Lance directed the jury in this case to find the accused, Paul McIntyre, not guilty. This was a retrial; Mcintyre was accused of unlawfully discharging a firearm in a manner likely to endanger another's safety. In 2002, McIntyre fired at thieves attempting to steal his quad-bike from his farm. Following two days of submissions and legal argument from Shaw and Barry Hart, and Crown prosecutor Kim Thomas, came the direction to the jury.

==== R v Alan Duff - District Court 2008 ====
In 2008, Shaw successfully represented writer Alan Duff MBE, who was found not guilty of failing to remain at a scene after being stopped by police. In September 2007 Duff was stopped for speeding but drove off after producing his licence and address. The Police appealed the judge's verdict. In the 2009 appeal decision, Duff was not convicted of any charges.

==== Morse v Queen - Supreme Court 2010 - Also known as "The Flag Burning Case" ====
In 2010, Shaw represented Valerie Morse in the New Zealand Supreme Court before Supreme Court, where her conviction was quashed. Morse was convicted of behaving in an offensive manner following her burning of a New Zealand Flag at the Wellington Cenotaph on Anzac Day, 25 April 2007, which she admitted. Morse said she was protesting New Zealand's military involvement in the Afghanistan war.

==== R (The Queen) v (Waihopai Spy Base Protestors) - District Court 2010 ====
In 2010, Shaw defended a client who had been charged with breaking into the high security New Zealand/US Spy Base. The New Zealand Herald reported that despite the three men admitting they had broken into the base, and despite a long and involved trial, the Jury took two hours to find each man not guilty. In 2008, the men were each charged with two charges of wilful damage and one of burglary, after breaking into the GCSB Waihopai gacility operated by the NZ government's New Zealand Government's Communications Security Bureau (GCSB). The Government said the individuals caused over $1 million of damage

==== Murder of Rau Tongia in Karori, Wellington ====
At the High Court in Wellington, starting in May 2024, Shaw represented a defendant charged in relation to alleged murder in April 2021 of 33-year-old Wellington man Rau Tongia. In 2021, Shaw secured interim name suppression for the defendant when she first appeared.

==== Liston-Lloyd v The Commissioner of Police (High Court) ====
Shaw successfully represented the plaintiff in a judicial review of the police's decision to improperly take DNA from the plaintiff. The decision required the police to pay compensation to plaintiff and ordered that the DNA sample be destroyed.

==== Marteley v The Legal Services Commissioner (Supreme Court) ====
Shaw and Tony Ellis successfully appealed a decision of the Court of Appeal in which the plaintiff had been refused Legal Aid to appeal against his conviction for murder. The Supreme Court's decision granted Legal Aid to the Plaintiff (pto appeal his conviction and awarded them costs of $25,000 and additional general costs and disbursements. The court created a benchmark and identified [at ] what would now be the seven "critical considerations" for a grant of Legal Aid.

=== Writing ===
Shaw is the co-author of several books and papers, including books published by Thomson Reuters and Oxford University Press.

==== Notable publications ====
- Human Rights Law Thomson Reuters - Antony Shaw & Andrew Butler (Human Rights Reports of New Zealand (HRNZ))
- Alternative Shadow Report 2009 (T. Ellis & A. Shaw) - Provided to the United Nations
- A Standard for Justice: A Commentary on the Draft Bill of Rights for New Zealand – June 5, 1986 by Jerome B. Elkind & Antony Shaw Paperback: 128 pages, Publisher: Oxford University Press (June 5, 1986), Language: English, ISBN 019558144X, ISBN 978-0195581447
