= Mount Cook Airline =

Regional airline of New Zealand (1920–2019)

Mount Cook Airlines

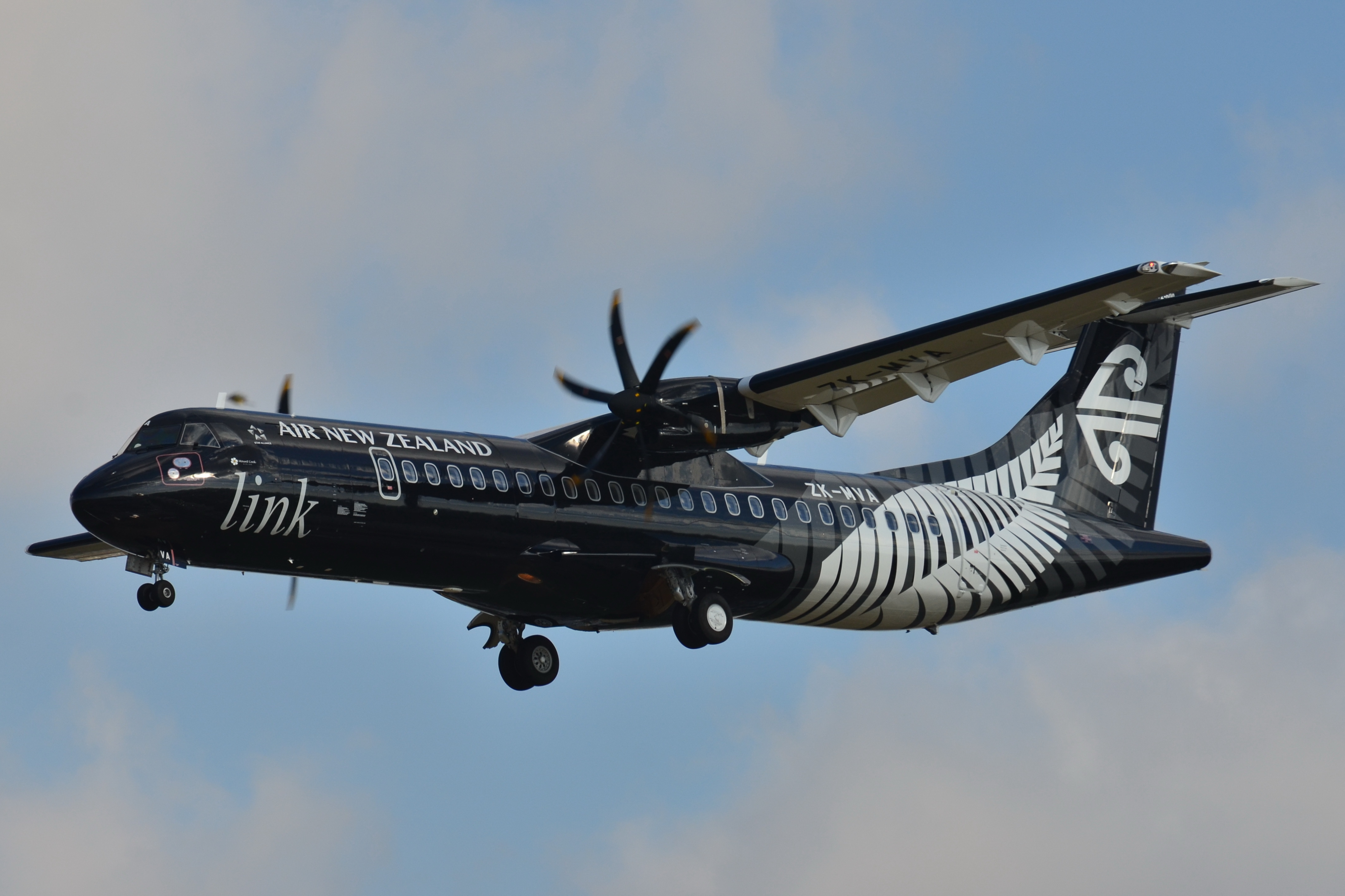
- Mount Cook Airlines ATR 72 operating for Air New Zealand Link
IATA	ICAO	Call sign
NM	NZM	MOUNTCOOK
- Founded: 1920
- Commenced operations: 6 November 1961
- Ceased operations: 9 December 2019
- Hubs: Auckland; Christchurch; Wellington
- Frequent-flyer program: Airpoints
- Alliance: Star Alliance (affiliate)
- Fleet size: 30
- Destinations: 15
- Parent company: Mount Cook Group (1920–1991); Air New Zealand (1991–2019)
- Headquarters: Christchurch, New Zealand
- Key people: Kelvin Duff (GM of Regional Airlines)
- Website: www.airnz.co.nz

Mount Cook Airline was a regional airline based in Christchurch, New Zealand. Formerly part of the Mount Cook Group and latterly a subsidiary of Air New Zealand, it operated scheduled services throughout the country under the Air New Zealand Link brand. In December 2019, the brand name was retired with all services operated under the Air New Zealand banner.

== Early history ==
=== NZ Aero Transport ===
NZ Aero Transport Co. was established in 1920 at Timaru by Rodolph Wigley, who in 1906 had driven the first motor car to The Hermitage. Wigley leased five surplus Royal Air Force aircraft from the NZ Government for sightseeing. It was the first company of its kind in the country. The first aeroplane to land in Fairlie was war surplus Avro 504K biplane E4242 in May 1920, still carrying RAF roundels. Passenger and freight routes served areas between Wellington and Invercargill. In October 1920 with Captain JC Mercer, Wigley flew on the first one-day flight from Invercargill to Auckland. After a series of mishaps, such as damage during forced landings in paddocks, the company went into liquidation in 1923.

NZ Aero Transport Co fleet
Aircraft	Introduced	Retired	Notes
Avro 504K	1920	1923	Five aircraft
Airco DH.9	1920	1923	Three aircraft

=== Queenstown – Mount Cook Airways ===
In 1935, Wigley formed Queenstown - Mount Cook Airway in conjunction with his son Henry, who remained the managing director of the airline until 1979 and chairman until his death in 1980. The company operated charter flights around the Otago Lakes, Milford Sound and Mount Cook regions, until it was suspended by World War II.

Queenstown - Mount Cook Airways fleet
Aircraft	Introduced	Retired	Notes
British Aircraft Swallow II	1936	1939	Two aircraft. One aircraft was impressed into military service with the RNZAF in 1939.
Waco QDC Biplane	1937	1940	One aircraft. The Waco QDC was impressed into military service with the RNZAF in 1940.

== Postwar history ==
Flying resumed in 1952 using an Auster J1-A Autocrat, registration ZK-BDX (since preserved, formerly inside the terminal of Queenstown Airport now at the Mount Cook Hermitage Hotel Edmund Hillary Centre).

In 1954, NZ Aero Transport Company was reformed as Mount Cook Air Services Ltd, specialising in scenic flights, agricultural work and rescue missions. Henry Wigley solved the problem of landing in the Tasman, Fox and Franz Josef Glaciers by attaching retractable skis (designed and made in the company's vehicle workshop) to the Auster, and landed on the snow of Tasman Glacier. This is how the Ski Plane operation started, aimed at taking tourists to skifields and glaciers in ski-equipped light aircraft.

The Mount Cook Group operated bus services, trucking, skifields and built an airfield at Mount Cook to bring in the growing number of visitors to the Southern Alps. Scheduled services for Mount Cook Airline began on 6 November 1961 between Christchurch, Mount Cook, Cromwell and Te Anau with a 26-seater Douglas DC-3. At this stage Queenstown was not certified for DC-3 operations and passengers were bussed from Cromwell to Queenstown. On 1 November 1963 the service to Cromwell was extended to Dunedin on Mondays, Wednesdays and Fridays and from 3 November 1963 to Invercargill three days a week. The first scheduled flight into Queenstown was operated by DC-3 ZK-BKD on 4 February 1964.

The airline opened negotiations with NZ Tourist Air Travel, which operated air charter and air taxi services using amphibious aircraft, about the possibility of a merger. A bid was made and finally accepted on 31 December 1967 with the company becoming part of Mount Cook Airlines on 1 January 1968.

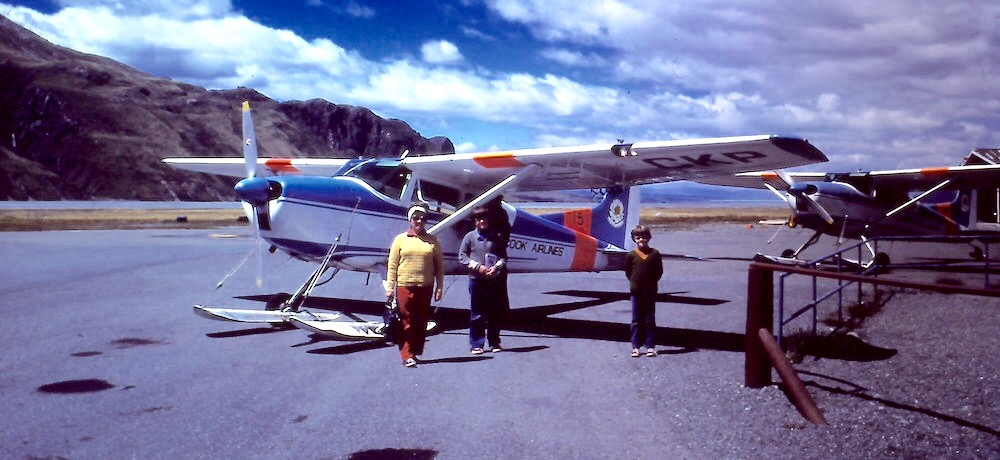
Cessna 185 ski-plane at Mount Cook Aerodrome in January 1977

Mount Cook Airline was one of New Zealand's tourism pioneers opening up the tourist trail of Rotorua through to Christchurch, Mount Cook and Queenstown. For almost 30 years, it operated a fleet of Hawker Siddeley HS 748s across regional tourist routes in New Zealand. The first HS748 to arrive in NZ was ZK-CWJ. Its first flight was from Christchurch to Timaru and onto Oamaru on 25 October 1968. After a long evaluation study, the first of the new ATR 72-200s arrived in October 1995 as the chosen replacement of the HS 748s. They in turn were updated to the ATR 72-500 type in 2000.

In June 2001, Air New Zealand Group added extra capacity on domestic routes by introducing four BAe 146s to supplement the ATRs. These aircraft were taken from the failed Qantas New Zealand franchise. A temporary measure, they retired the following year after six extra Boeing 737-300s were added to the mainline fleet.

Air New Zealand purchased part of the Mount Cook Group in the 1980s after Henry Wigley's death. This increased to 30% on 5 December 1983, then another 47% in October 1985 after gaining approval on 18 July that year; and the remainder on 18 April 1991. After this final purchase Mount Cook became a subsidiary of Air New Zealand. On 9 December 2019, the airline was merged into the mainline Air New Zealand fleet and ceased to exist.

Mount Cook Airline had 378 employees (as at March 2007).

== Destinations ==
Mount Cook Airline served the following routes in New Zealand at its closure:

Auckland to:	Napier, Nelson, New Plymouth, Palmerston North, Tauranga
Christchurch to:	Dunedin, Hamilton, Invercargill, Napier, Nelson, Palmerston North, Queenstown, Rotorua, Tauranga, Wellington
Wellington to:	Christchurch, Dunedin, Hamilton, Invercargill, Napier, New Plymouth, Queenstown, Tauranga

== Former destinations ==
Over the years Mount Cook Airline served many destinations throughout New Zealand, including:

Alexandra, Blenheim, Chatham Islands, Cromwell, Great Barrier Island, Greymouth, Hokitika, Kerikeri, Kaikohe, Kawau Island, Milford Sound, Mount Cook Village, Oamaru, Paihia, Stewart Island / Rakiura, Taupō, Te Anau, Timaru, Twizel, Waiheke Island, Wānaka and Westport.

== Fleet ==
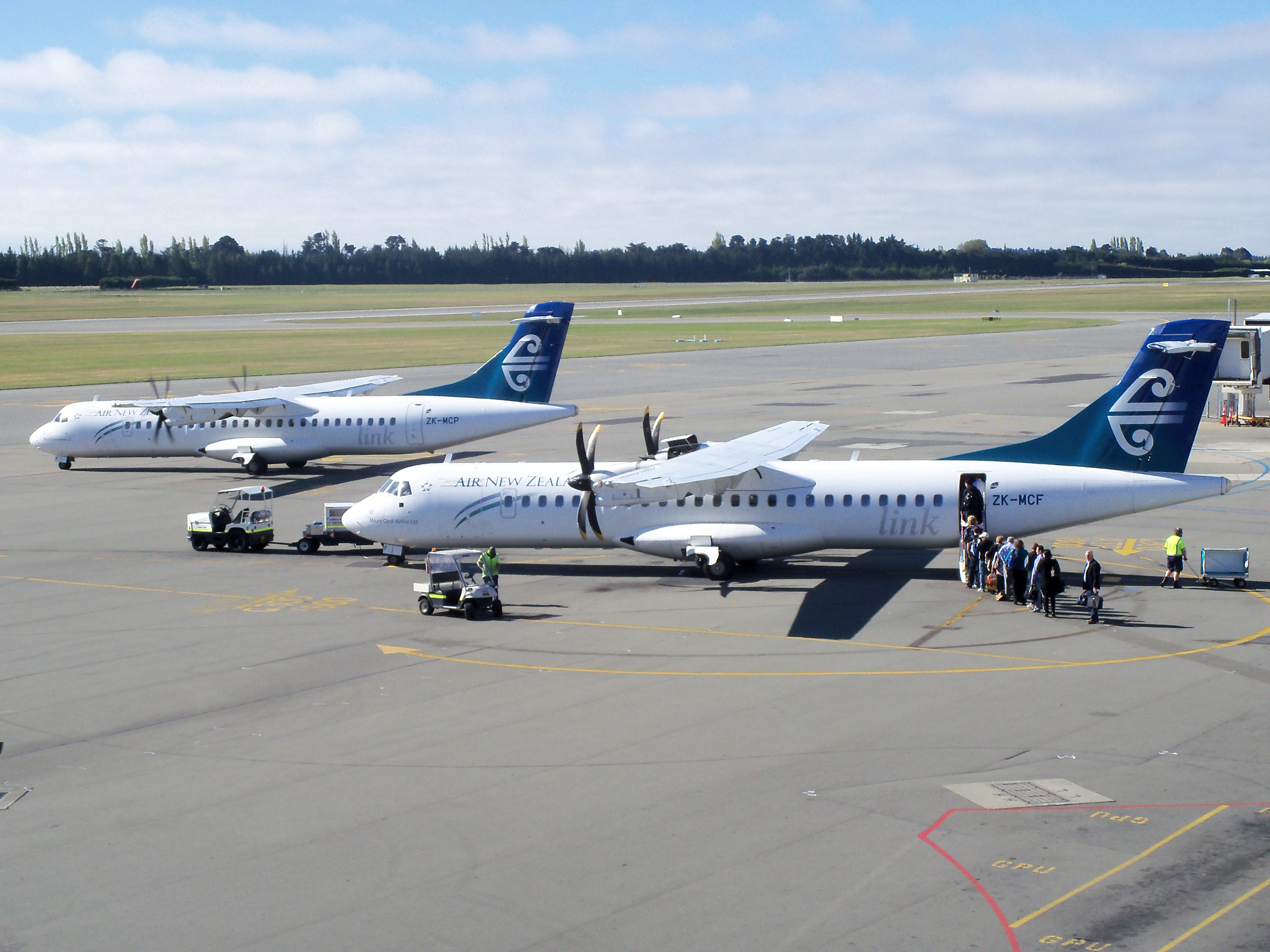
Mount Cook ATRs at Christchurch Airport in Air New Zealand Pacific Wave livery

At the time it ceased operations, Mount Cook Airline operated ATR 72-500 and ATR 72-600 aircraft from main cities to larger provincial towns and also on some main trunk routes, complementing fellow subsidiary Air Nelson's smaller capacity Q300 aircraft.

The original ATR 72-200 fleet was swapped for the updated ATR 72-500 during 2001–2002. Extra aircraft were also added allowing Air New Zealand to retire the last of its Boeing 737-200s. In October 2011, Air New Zealand announced an increase of the ATR fleet by purchasing seven new ATR 72-600 models with five on option. Air New Zealand received the first of these 68-seat aircraft in October 2012, the rest following gradually through to 2016. Four purchase options were taken up in November 2014 when Air New Zealand announced the shutting down of Eagle Airways' flight operations and giving over route capacity to Mount Cook and Air Nelson. The ATR-600s were delayed for four years due to the economic conditions of the time. The -600 model is a further development of the type including a revised cabin layout and RNP navigation to allow flights into New Zealand's more marginal weather dependent airports such as Wellington, Queenstown, Rotorua and Hamilton.

Air New Zealand announced on 5 November 2015 that an order for an additional 15 ATR 72-600 aircraft, worth NZ$568 million, had been placed making Mount Cook Airlines the third-largest ATR fleet operator in the world with 29 ATR72-600 aircraft. Deliveries of the additional 15 -600 aircraft, started in late 2016 with the last aircraft delivered to Mount Cook Airline in 2019. Subsequent aircraft will now be delivered to parent company Air New Zealand. The new aircraft replaced the existing 11 ATR 72-500 aircraft. The additional ATR 72-600, are used on domestic regional services, supplementing existing ATR 72-500, -600 and Q300 aircraft.

The Mount Cook Airline fleet consisted of the following aircraft (as of August 2019):

Mount Cook Airline
Aircraft	Total	Orders	Passengers (Economy)	Notes
ATR 72-500	7	0	68	Being replaced by ATR 72-600s
ATR 72-600	23	6	68	Replacing ATR 72-500.
Total	30	6		

=== Former fleet ===
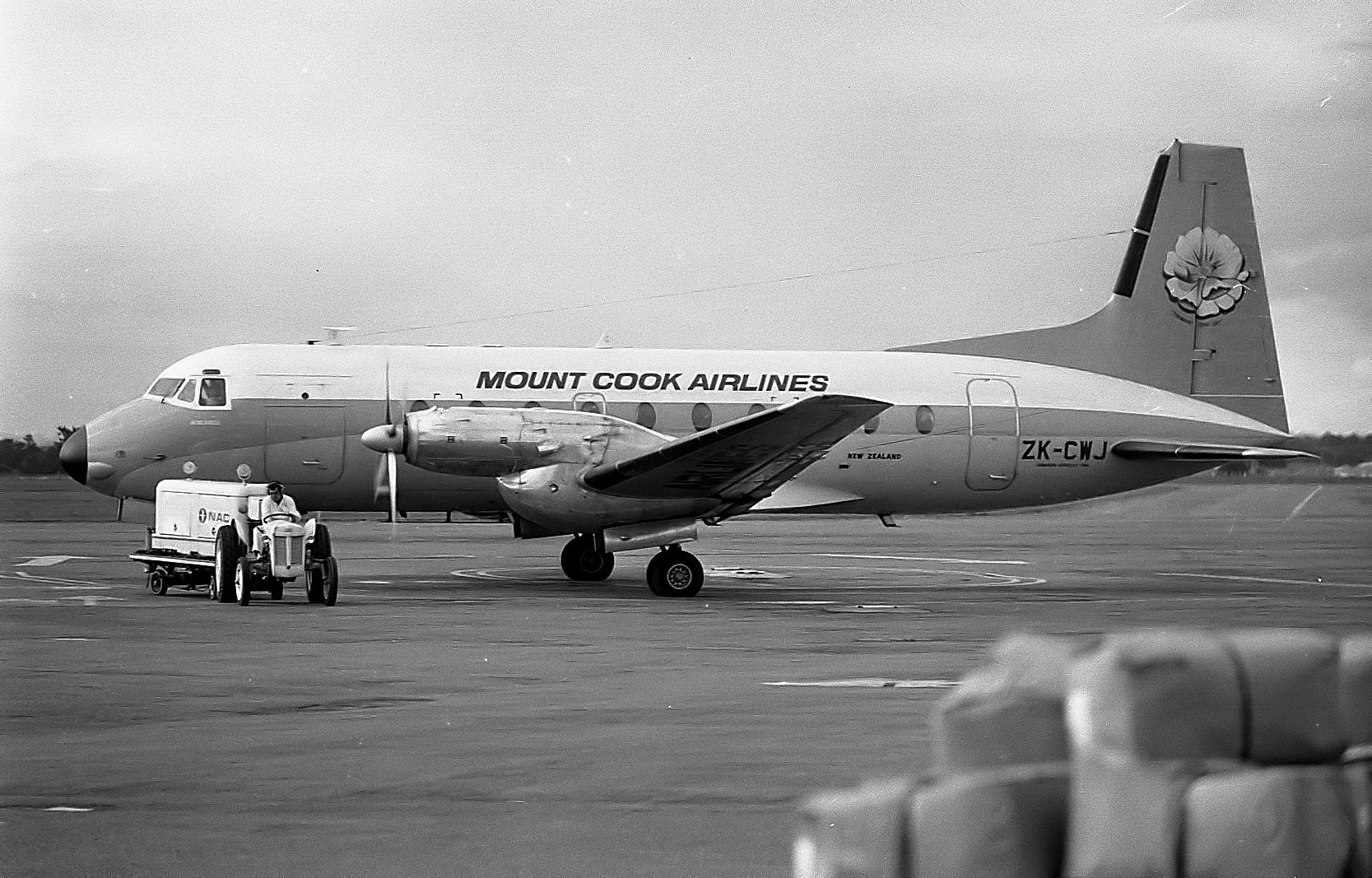
Hawker Siddeley HS 748 at Palmerston North Airport in 1974

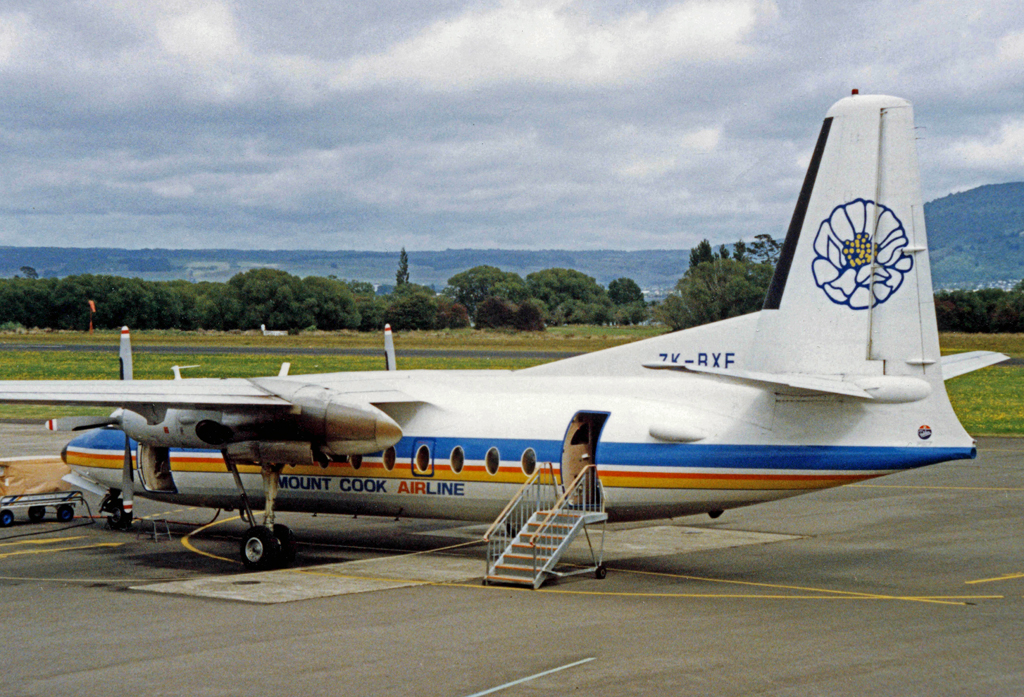
Fokker F27 Friendship at Rotorua Airport in 1992

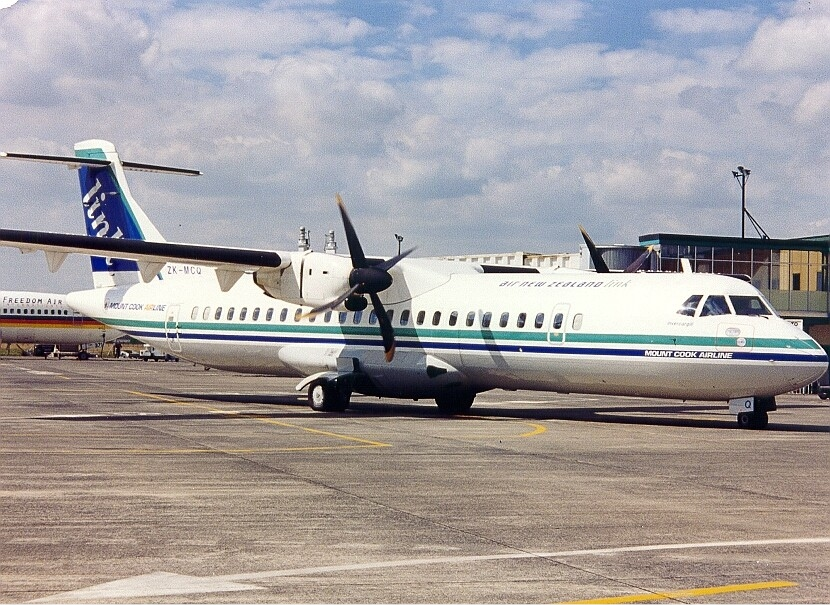
A Mount Cook ATR 72–200 in the old Air New Zealand Link livery at Hamilton Airport in 1997

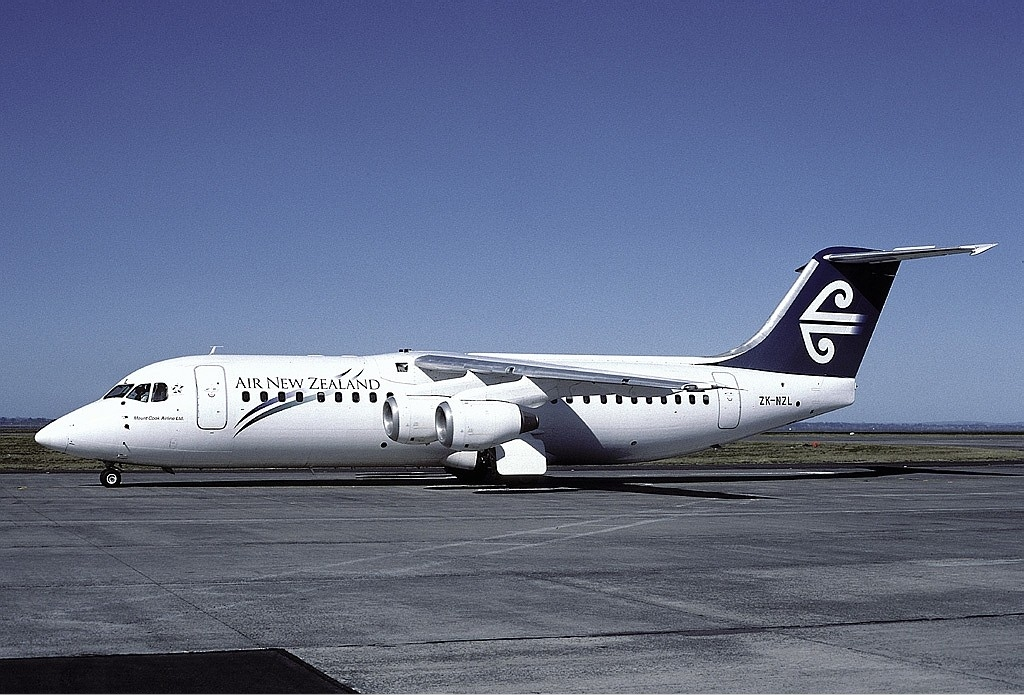
A BAe 146-300 as operated briefly by Mount Cook Airline at Auckland Airport in 2001

From 6 November 1961, Mount Cook Airline operated three Douglas DC-3 aircraft operating until their final withdrawal on 16 May 1978. These aircraft were used to open up routes between Christchurch and Mount Cook, Cromwell and Te Anau/Manapouri. Passengers bound for Queenstown were initially bussed from Cromwell until DC-3 certification was obtained for Queenstown airport (although Cromwell was still used on demand, and as backup when Queenstown airport was unavailable due to weather). DC-3 aircraft were also used at various dates for services from Christchurch to Timaru and Oamaru, Queenstown to Alexandra and Dunedin and an extension from Te Anau to Invercargill.

A fleet of Hawker Siddeley HS-748s was operated from 1968 to 1996 operating into Mount Cook Airline's many tourist airports. The type operated scheduled services to the Chatham Islands from 1990 to 1992 after Safe Air withdrew flying operations. From 1992 to 1994, Air New Zealand chartered a 748 to operate the late evening off peak Invercargill - Christchurch route. The last commercial flight was on 9 February 1996, from Wellington to Christchurch. The HS 748 fleet was replaced by 7 ATR 72-200s from 1995 after an evaluation process that included the Fokker F50, BAE ATP, and Saab 2000.

On 2 December 1969, Mount Cook Airline introduced a de Havilland Canada DHC-6 Twin Otter (ZK-CJZ), intended for scenic flights from Queenstown to Milford Sound and scheduled flights from Queenstown to Te Anau/Manapouri and Queenstown to Alexandra and Dunedin. The Twin Otter wasn't an economic success and was cancelled from 24 September 1973. A second Twin Otter (ZK-MCO) was purchased in November 1983 for services between Auckland, Kerikeri and Rotorua as the HS 748 was too big for the loads on offer, but Mount Cook's Islander aircraft was too small. In 1988 this was transferred to Queenstown, to operate scenic flights from Queenstown to Milford Sound and scheduled flights from Queenstown to Te Anau/Manapouri. A third was purchased in 1995 but both were disposed of in 1998 when Mount Cook Airlines light aircraft business was sold.

Eight ex-Qantas New Zealand British Aerospace 146-300s were temporarily operated by Air New Zealand after Qantas New Zealand's collapse. They were used to boost extra capacity to domestic service from June 2001 to 2002. The BAe 146s were placed under Mount Cook Airline's management structure for the duration. (Up to 4 aircraft were operated at any one time as the BAe fleet were rotated through and sold off.) This allowed time for Air New Zealand to add another six Boeing 737-300s to the mainline fleet. The BAe 146s were then retired ending 12 years of domestic service in New Zealand.

Aircraft previously operated include:

Aircraft	Introduced	Retired	Notes
ATR 72-200	1995	2006	
Auster J/1B Aiglet	1951		Two aircraft
Auster J/5P Autocar	1956		Two aircraft
British Aerospace 146-300	2001	2002	Eight aircraft
Bell 206B Jetranger	1980	1985	One helicopter
Britten-Norman Islander	1970		Six aircraft
Cessna 180			Four aircraft
Cessna 185 Skywagon			Now operated by Mount Cook Ski Planes.
Cessna U206 Stationair			Three aircraft
de Havilland DH.98B Dominie			Three aircraft
de Havilland DH.89A Dragon Ripide			One aircraft
de Havilland Tiger Moth			Two aircraft
De Havilland Canada DHC-6 Twin Otter	1969	1998	Three aircraft
Douglas DC-3 Dakota	1961	1978	Four aircraft
Eurocopter AS.350B Squirrel 1	1997	1998	One helicopter
Fletcher FU.24			Six aircraft
Fokker F27-100 Friendship	1991		One leased aircraft
Fokker F27-200 Friendship	1981		Three aircraft leased from the Department of Civil Aviation.
GAF N22C Nomad	1993	1998	One aircraft
GAF N24A Nomad	1993	1998	One aircraft
Grumman G-21A Goose	1972	1975	One aircraft
Grumman G-44A Widgeon		1975	Six aircraft
Hawker Siddeley HS 748	1968	1996	Eight aircraft
Kawasaki BK 117 Helicopter	1996	1998	Three helicopters
Miles M-11A Whitney Straight			One aircraft
Pilatus PC-6 Turbo Porter	1982		Four aircraft. Now operated by Mount Cook Ski Planes.
Piper PA-18A Super Cub	1956		Two aircraft
Piper PA-22 Tri Pacer	1956		One aircraft
Piper PA-31-350 Chieftain	1993	1997	Three aircraft

=== Change in heavy maintenance ===
In April 2010, parent airline Air New Zealand announced that it was moving the ATR 72-500 and ATR 72-600 heavy maintenance work away from Mount Cook Airline's home of Christchurch Airport to Nelson. Air Nelson's maintenance base would take over all ATR 72-500/600 heavy maintenance work from November 2010.

== Logo ==
Former Mount Cook Airlines logo

The airline's symbol was the Mount Cook Lily which was displayed on the tails of its aeroplanes prior to the integration with the Air New Zealand link brand in the mid 1990s. At this stage, the flower was relegated to a spot just below the tail, before vanishing totally in the early 2000s. However, it made a return in 2012, appearing towards the front of Mount Cook's ATR 72-600 aircraft. The new logo was a much-simplified flower, featuring six separate petals rather than the former layered specimen.

== Surviving aircraft ==
Most of Mount Cook Airline's ATR 72's are still in operation, either with Air New Zealand or sold off to other operators. Below is a list of other known aircraft that flew in Mount Cook colours.

Surviving MCA Aircraft
Type	Registration	Location/Operator	Notes
Auster J1-A Autocrat	ZK-BDX	Located at Mount Cook Hermitage Hotel Edmund Hillary Centre	
De Havilland DH.89B Dominie	ZK-AKY	Located at Croydon Aviation Heritage Centre, Mandeville	Painted in Mount Cook Airlines blue, but never wore the Mount Cook Lilly
Douglas DC-3 Skyliner	ZK-BKD	Located at Smash Palace Bar, Gisborne	Ex Australian National Airways and NAC
Douglas DC-3 Viewmaster	ZK-CAW	Located at McDonald's, Taupō	Ex Australian National Airways
Hawker Siddeley HS 748	ZK-CWJ	Located in Dhaka, Bangladesh	Stored, last used as freight aircraft
Grumman G44A Super Widgeon	ZK-CFA	Located in Kerikeri, Bay of Islands	Restored and in flying condition

== See also ==
- List of defunct airlines of New Zealand
- History of aviation in New Zealand
