= Air Nelson =

Airline of New Zealand (1979–2019)

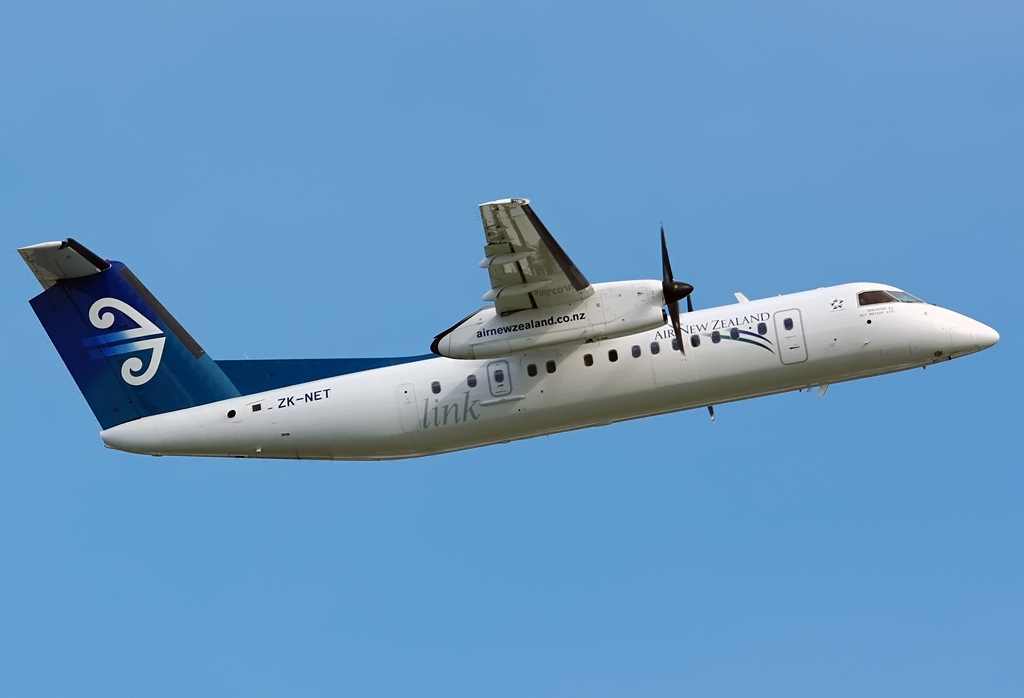
- Air Nelson Bombardier DHC-8-Q300 in 2010
IATA	ICAO	Call sign
NZ	RLK	LINK
- Founded: 30 June 1979
- Ceased operations: 19 November 2019
- Hubs: Auckland; Christchurch; Wellington
- Frequent-flyer program: Airpoints
- Alliance: Star Alliance (affiliate)
- Fleet size: 23
- Destinations: 19
- Parent company: Air New Zealand
- Headquarters: Nelson, New Zealand
- Key people: Kelvin Duff (GM Regional Airlines)
- Website: www.airnelson.co.nz

Air Nelson was a regional airline based in Nelson, New Zealand. It was founded as an independent airline in 1979. Air New Zealand took a 50% shareholding in 1988 and 100% ownership in 1995. Air Nelson operated services on provincial routes under the Air New Zealand Link brand.

The airline operated one type of aircraft, the 50-seat Bombardier Q300, which provided an intensive regional air service that cannot be sustained with regional jet types of this size. Until 2008, it operated the 33-seat Saab 340, which took over provincial Fokker F27 services by Air New Zealand in 1990.

Air Nelson Q300s wore the Air New Zealand livery and operated from Kerikeri in the far north of the North Island to Invercargill in the far south of the South Island. The airline had 517 employees (at March 2015).

On 31 March 2019, it was announced that Air New Zealand was considering merging both Air Nelson and fellow Link subsidiary Mount Cook Airline into the mainline fleet.

Air Nelson Ltd continues to employ more than 100 Flight Attendants, who operate the Dash 8 Q300 on behalf of parent company Air New Zealand.

== History ==
=== Early history ===
It was founded on 30 June 1979 by Robert Inglis and Nicki Smith as a flying school and charter services with the name of Motueka Air. In 1988 it was renamed to Air Nelson and acquired by Air New Zealand operating under Air New Zealand Link name.

It initially operated as a small commuter airline in the top half of the South Island, linking Nelson and Wellington with up to half-hourly services. It also provided isolated towns such as Takaka and Motueka with a convenient and safe service to the outside world. At this time aircraft included Piper PA-31 Navajo, Fairchild Metro, and Embraer EMB 110 Bandeirante.

In 1986, Air New Zealand announced it would start to scale back its Fokker F27 Friendship operations and smaller regional centres were the first affected. Air Nelson services immediately replaced the F27 on those routes. Air Nelson grew their network at the same time and started operating non-stop service to Auckland, complementing F27 services.

Air New Zealand purchased a 50% stake in Air Nelson (and a 50% stake in Eagle Airways) in 1988 to secure the airline's support when deregulation saw the arrival of Ansett New Zealand.

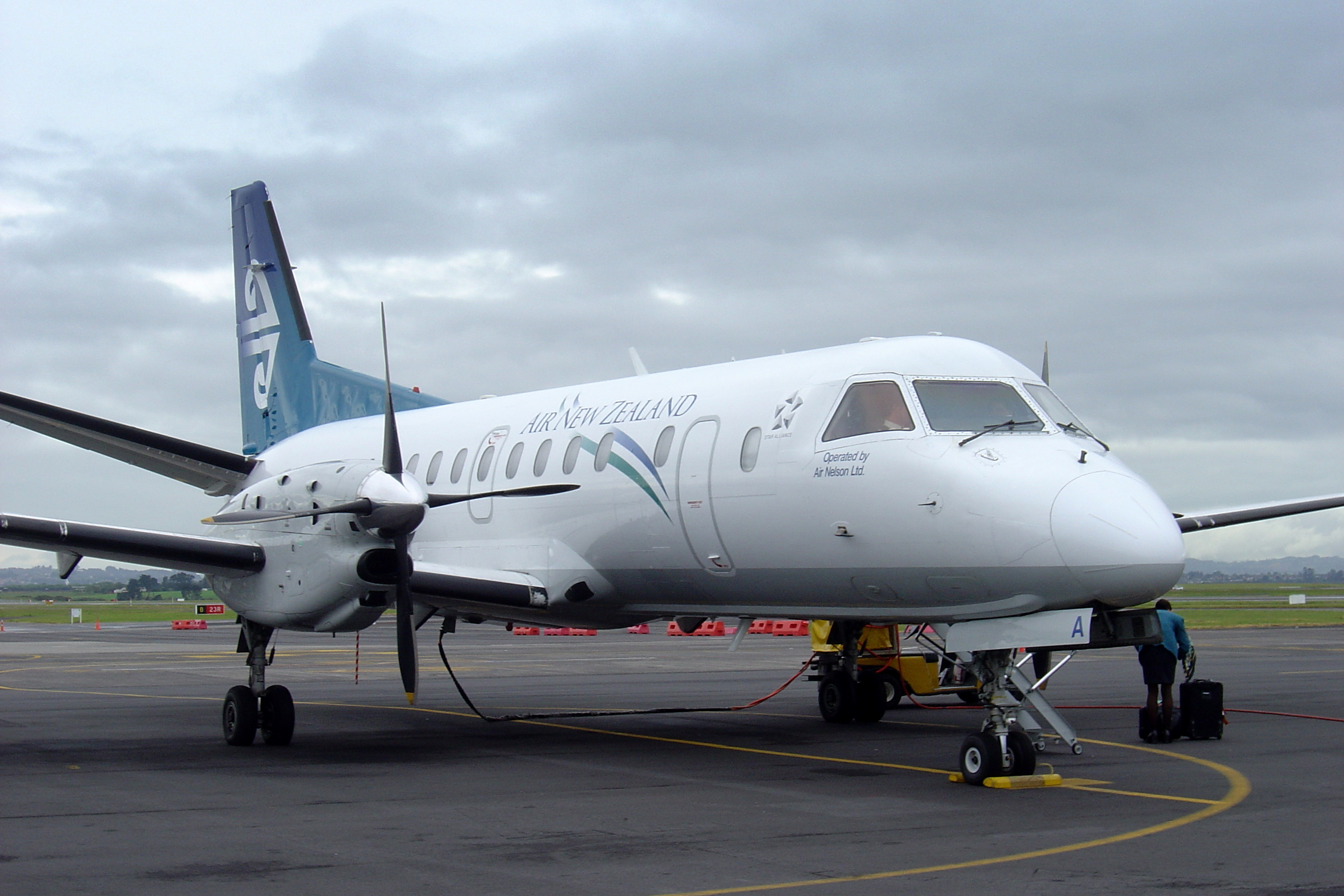
Air Nelson Saab 340A at Auckland Airport in November 2005

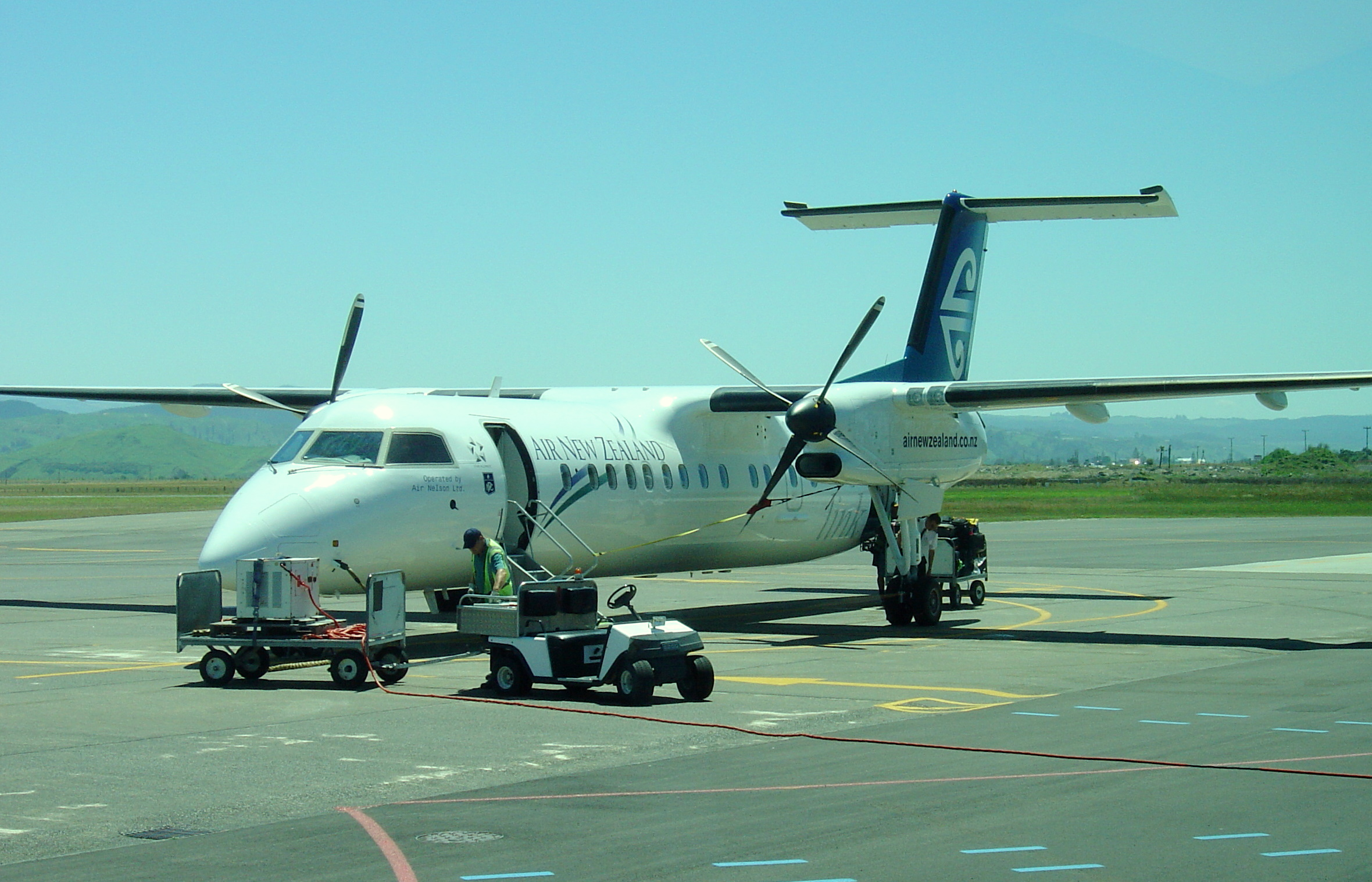
Air Nelson DeHavilland Canada Dash 8-300 on the tarmac at Hawke's Bay Airport in November 2005

Air New Zealand suspended all F27 services in August 1990 and Air Nelson responded by introducing the Saab 340. Initially the Saab 340 wore Air Nelson colours, before all Air Nelson's fleet were repainted in Air New Zealand's 'Link' livery. The Saab fleet soon grew to one of the largest in the world at that time and Air Nelson divested itself of its smaller aircraft, operating only the Saab. This was in line with Air New Zealand's policy of rationalising the overall cost of fleet maintenance. Eagle Airways soon operated a fleet of Beechcraft 1900Ds, while Mount Cook Airlines operated the ATR 72-500.

=== Full Air New Zealand ownership ===
Air New Zealand took 100% ownership of Air Nelson in 1995.

The last Saab 340A aircraft had been withdrawn from service by the end of 2007. The company had 23 Dash 8 Q300 aircraft. Air Nelson was the largest singular operator of the Q300 outside Canada. Although Air Nelson looked towards ATR for the smaller ATR 42, Bombardier offered a better discount for a bulk purchase.

The increase in fleet size allowed Air New Zealand to start pioneering longer provincial routes that were considered sustainable with 50-seat aircraft, such as Wellington to Invercargill, New Plymouth and Tauranga to Christchurch. Air New Zealand has also used the Q300 to ramp up a more intensive high-frequency regional service allowing more departure choices. A new Paraparaumu to Auckland route was started in 2011. A second route from the Kāpiti Coast was opened in 2013, Paraparaumu to Christchurch, but it could not be sustained and the short-lived service ceased in 2015.

The Hokitika–Christchurch route joined the Air Nelson network as a result of the Pike River coal mine disaster in November 2010 when Air New Zealand added capacity to the Westland town. This became permanent in February 2011 when subsidiary operator Air National was grounded by the NZCAA due to irregularities with operating practises. The larger aircraft proved popular on peak services to the West Coast airport, which also serves the town of Greymouth.

In November 2014, Air Nelson started to take over services from fellow subsidiary Eagle Airways after parent company Air New Zealand had announced the close-down of the airline by August 2016. Routes including Auckland–Taupō, Auckland–Whanganui, Hamilton – Palmerston North, Wellington–Gisborne, Wellington–Timaru, Wellington – Palmerston North and Christchurch–Blenheim joined the Air Nelson network as a result of Eagle Airways' closure. Air New Zealand immediately reviewed and closed down the Auckland–Hamilton, Auckland–Whanganui and Christchurch–Blenheim routes. Some routes were picked up by second-tier operators.

In 2018 Air New Zealand announced that the Auckland–Paraparaumu route was to close due to aircraft scheduling issues. After intense lobbying by local authorities, Air Chathams took over the route with a Saab 340 airliner in September 2018, with Air New Zealand leaving behind ground servicing equipment for the airline to use.

=== End of operation and merger ===
On 19 November 2019, the merger of Air Nelson took place, with their pilots and fleet moving to the Air New Zealand air operators certificate and the airline ceasing to operate, these aircraft are now also operating under the Air New Zealand callsigns (NZxxxx), furthermore removing the old RLK ICAO code.

Despite the company no longer operating its own aircraft, Air Nelson Ltd continues to employ over 100 Flight Attendants, who operate the Dash 8 Q300 on behalf of parent company Air New Zealand.

On 19 May 2025 Air Nelson's remaining staff, the Dash 8 Q300 Flight Attendants, transferred to Air New Zealand bringing the story of Air Nelson to a close.

== Destinations ==
Air Nelson served the following routes at its closure:

- From Auckland to
  - Blenheim, Gisborne, Kerikeri, Nelson, New Plymouth, Palmerston North, Rotorua, Taupō, Tauranga, Whangārei
- From Christchurch to
  - Hamilton, Hokitika, Invercargill, Napier, Nelson, New Plymouth, Palmerston North, Tauranga, Wellington
- From Wellington to
  - Blenheim, Christchurch, Gisborne, Hamilton, Invercargill, Napier, Nelson, New Plymouth, Palmerston North, Rotorua, Tauranga, Timaru
- From Palmerston North to
  - Hamilton

Air Nelson used to serve the towns of Kāpiti Coast, Motueka, Oamaru, Takaka, Westport and Whanganui.

== Fleet ==
The Air Nelson fleet consisted of the following aircraft (as of August 2019):

Aircraft	Total	Orders	Passengers (Economy)	Notes
Bombardier DHC-8-Q300	23	0	50	

=== Historic fleet ===
Aircraft	Introduced	Retired	Notes
Cessna 152	1986	1997	One aircraft
Cessna 650 Citation III	1995	1998	One aircraft
Fairchild Swearingen SA.227 Metro	1987	2002	12 aircraft
Piper PA-23-250E Aztec	1984	1992	Three aircraft
Piper PA-31-310 Navajo	1986	1997	Two aircraft
Piper PA-31-350 Chieftain	1986	1995	Five aircraft
Saab 340A	1990	2008	Seventeen aircraft

== Accidents ==
- On 30 September 2010, Air New Zealand subsidiary Air Nelson Flight 8841 was flying from Wellington Airport to Nelson Airport but was diverted to Blenheim due to bad weather in Nelson. On landing, the front landing gear on the Dash 8 Series 300 collapsed. The aircraft stopped successfully on the forward section of its fuselage and all 46 passengers and 3 crew members left the aircraft uninjured. The aircraft registration was ZK-NEB.
- A similar incident on 9 February 2011 saw an Air Nelson Q300 flying from Hamilton to Wellington diverted to Blenheim when the nose wheel failed to deploy. The plane made a successful nose down landing with none of the 44 passengers injured. It was later determined that the pilots failed to release the uplock lever with the necessary pressure for the landing gear to release.
- On 12 March 2019, two Air Nelson Q300 aircraft came close to collision on approach to Wellington Airport, with both aircraft taking evasive action after receiving traffic collision avoidance system resolution advisories (TCAS RA). Air Nelson flight 8285 from Gisborne was cleared for a visual approach to runway 34, third in sequence behind Jetstar flight 290 from Christchurch and Air Nelson flight 8235 from Rotorua. The pilots on flight 8285 misidentified the Jetstar Airbus A320 as the company Q300 and turned base early into the path of flight 8235.

== See also ==
- List of defunct airlines of New Zealand
- History of aviation in New Zealand
