= Taupō Airport =

Taupō Airport Te Papa Waka Rererangi o Taupō
- IATA: TUO; ICAO: NZAP

Summary
- Airport type: Public
- Operator: Taupo Airport Authority
- Location: Taupō
- Elevation AMSL: 1,335 ft (407 m)
- Coordinates: 38°44′23″S 176°05′04″E
- Website: taupoairport.co.nz

Map
- Location of airport in North Island

Runways
Direction	Length		Surface
Direction	ft	m	Surface
17/35	4,547	1,386	Asphalt
10/28	2,198	670	Grass

Taupō Airport (Māori: Te Papa Waka Rererangi o Taupō, (IATA: TUO, ICAO: NZAP)) is a small airport 8 km (5.0 mi) to the south of Taupō township on the eastern shores of Lake Taupō, New Zealand.

Scheduled flights are operated by Air New Zealand Link, using Bombardier DHC-8-Q300 from Auckland. The airport is a popular destination for private jets, due to its close proximity to trout fishing, golf, hunting, skiing and luxury resorts.

A number of small charter and training operations are also based here, along with maintenance providers and a large search and rescue facility. Taupō Airport is the busiest parachute drop zone in New Zealand. Prior to the COVID-19 pandemic there were two commercial tandem skydiving companies operating from the airport, however one has since gone out of business as a result.

== Airlines and destinations ==
Airlines	Destinations
Air New Zealand	Auckland

== Operational information ==
- Airfield elevation 1335 ft AMSL
- Runway 17/35, 1386 x 30 metres sealed
- Runway 10/28, 670 x 32 metres grass
- Runway lighting available
- Pavement strength PCN 26 is advisory only
- Traffic circuit: RWY 11/17 – right hand RWY 29/35 – left hand
  - Circuit height: 2300 ft AMSL
- RWY 10 is not available for takeoff
- Grass parallel to Rwy 17/35 closed take-off and landing

Taupo Airport is located within a Mandatory Broadcast Zone (MBZ) in uncontrolled (G) airspace with type C airspace starting at 6500 ft AMSL and controlled by Christchurch Control. Taupo Airport is the second-busiest non-towered airport in New Zealand.

== 2020 Taupō Airport re-development ==
Funded from Provincial Growth Fund, New Zealand Upgrade Programme and also the Taupō District Council, the project had begun in March 2020 and was completed in October 2021.

The re-development saw a new terminal built that caters to the increase in traveller movements. The apron size will also be increased once the old terminal has been removed, which will make room for more aircraft parking. A new car park will also be developed within the airport.

== Operators ==
- Helicopter Services (BOP) Ltd
- Heli Maintenance (BOP) Ltd
- Lakeview Helicopters
- Philips Search and Rescue Trust
- Rotor and Wing Maintenance
- Taupo Tandem Skydiving
- Chopperworks
- Super Air
- Argus Aviation
- Helisika

== See also ==
- List of airports in New Zealand
- List of airlines of New Zealand

== Sources ==
NZAIP Volume 4 AD
