= Richard Pearse Airport =

Richard Pearse Airport (Timaru Airport)
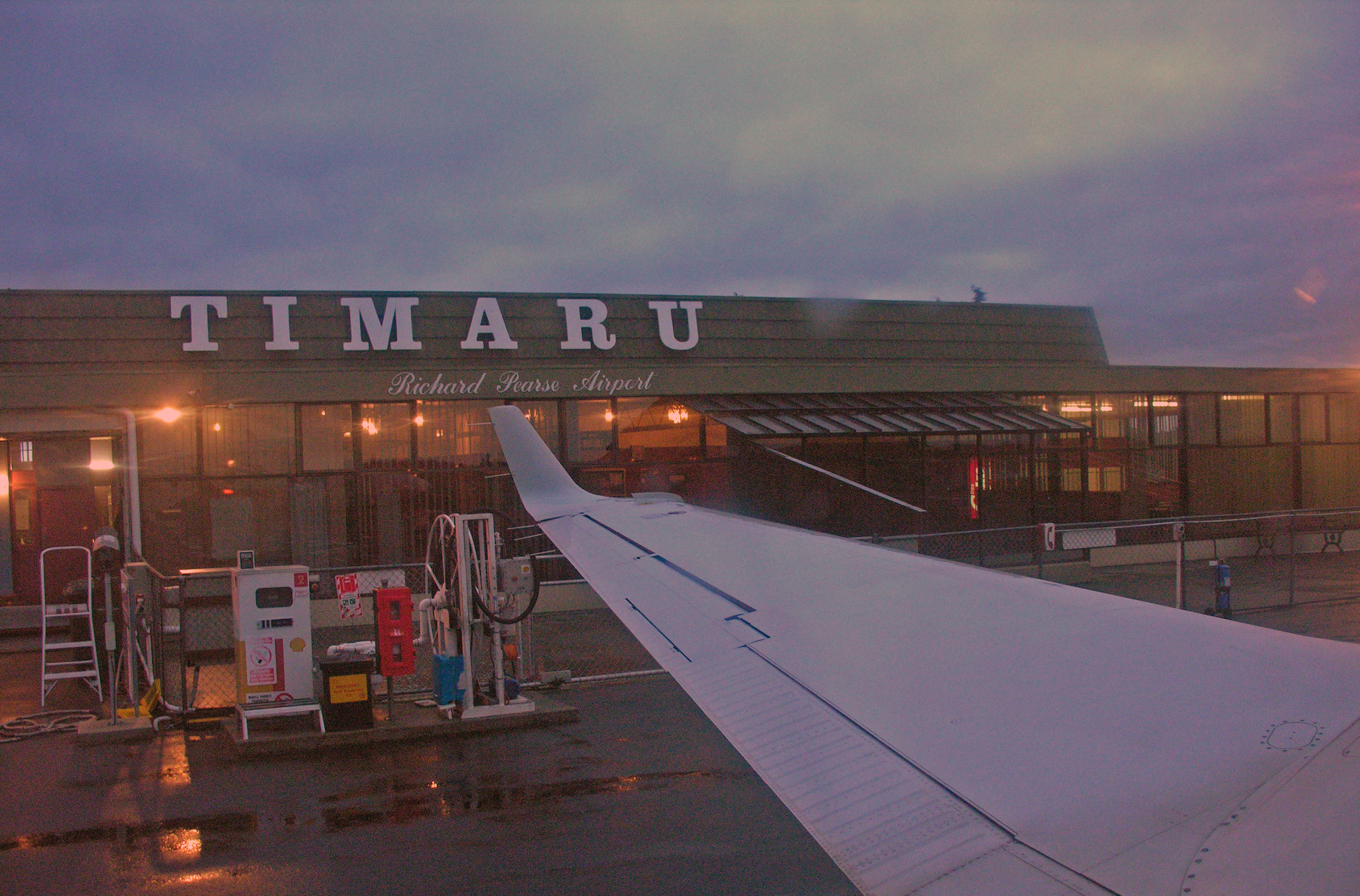
- Richard Pearse Airport
- IATA: TIU; ICAO: NZTU

Summary
- Airport type: Public
- Operator: Timaru District Council
- Location: Timaru, New Zealand
- Elevation AMSL: 89 ft / 27 m
- Coordinates: 44°18′10″S 171°13′31″E
- Website: https://www.timaru.govt.nz/community/facilities/airport

Map
- Location of airport in South Island

Runways
Direction	Length		Surface
Direction	m	ft	Surface
02R/20L	1,280	4,200	Asphalt
02L/20R	1,188	3,898	Grass
11/29	1,113	3,652	Grass
- Sources: AIP and DAFIF

Richard Pearse Airport (IATA: TIU, ICAO: NZTU), also known as Timaru Airport, is located off the Pleasant Point Highway, 4 km north of the suburb Washdyke in Timaru, New Zealand.

== History ==
The airport takes its name from the local pioneer aviator, Richard Pearse, who allegedly flew in powered flight before the Wright Brothers. The airport is a small regional airport with one gate, one asphalt runway and two grass runways. The South Canterbury Aero Club is based at the airport and frequently uses the airport for training and recreational purposes.

There are regular Air New Zealand Link flights to Wellington using Bombardier Q300 aircraft, formerly flights were operated to Oamaru and Christchurch. Timaru, is the only major centre without a direct air service to Auckland. Eagle Airways used to operate from Timaru to Wellington with Beechcraft 1900D aircraft.

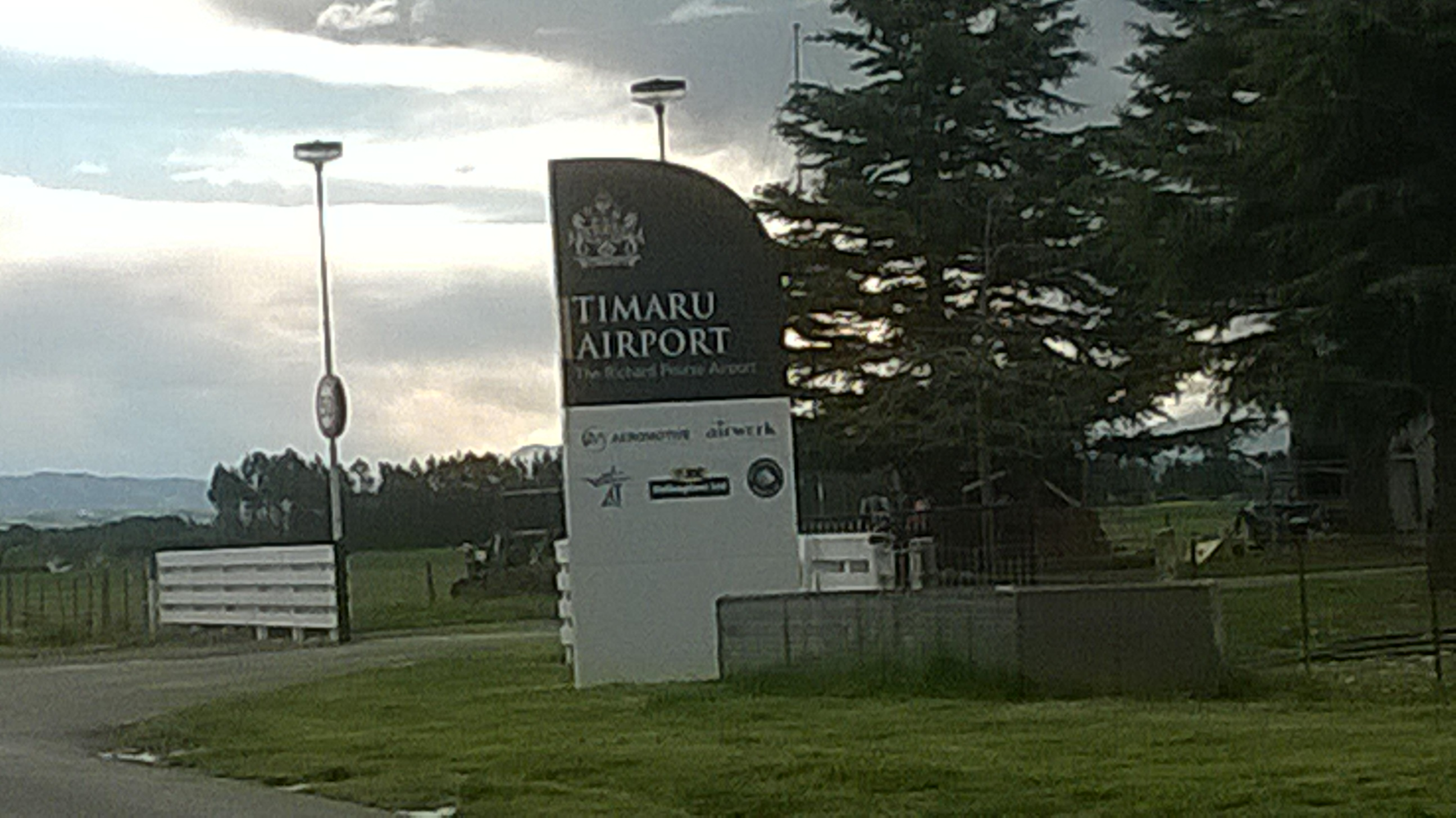
The Sign outside Timaru Airport, 2014

== Upgrade ==
A $1.3 million upgrade was approved in November 2015 by the Timaru District Council. The upgrade would increase the current terminal space from 450 square metres to cover almost 600 square metres and would include a new luggage collection area. The upgrade was in response to the increase in capacity on Air New Zealand Link flights to Wellington using the higher capacity Bombardier Q300.

== Airline and destination ==
Airlines	Destinations
Air New Zealand	Wellington

== See also ==
- List of airports in New Zealand
- List of airlines of New Zealand
- Transport in New Zealand
