= Hokitika Airport =

Airport

- IATA: HKK; ICAO: NZHK

Summary
- Airport type: Public
- Operator: Hokitika Airport Ltd
- Location: Hokitika, New Zealand
- Elevation AMSL: 153 ft (47 m)
- Coordinates: 42°42′49″S 170°59′07″E
- Website: www.hokitikaairport.co.nz

Map
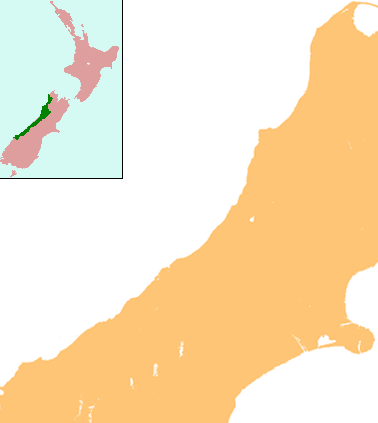
- Location of airport in West Coast

Runways
Direction	Length		Surface
Direction	m	ft	Surface
03/21	1,152	3,780	Asphalt
12/30	1,176	3,858	Asphalt

Hokitika Aerodrome (IATA: HKK, ICAO: NZHK) is a small, uncontrolled aerodrome located 1.9 km north east of Hokitika in the suburb of Seaview on the West Coast of the South Island of New Zealand. It is also the closest domestic airport with scheduled flights to the town of Greymouth 40 km further north, the largest settlement on the coast.

The airport handles aircraft up to ATR 72-600 size that are operated by the national airline, Air New Zealand. The airport has a single terminal and 2 tarmac gates.

== History ==
Air Travel (NZ) Ltd was the first airline in New Zealand to fly scheduled air services. Founded by Bert Mercer in 1934, its first scheduled flight took place on 18 December 1934, from Hokitika to Haast in South Westland. During the Second World War they also flew north from Hokitika to Greymouth, Westport and Nelson.

Hokitika originally had an aerodrome on the south side of town just over the Hokitika River.

The grass surfaces and susceptibility to flooding of Hokitika's Southside airfield were always problematic. On 9 August 1948 the Southside airfield at Hokitika was closed. Plans were well underway for a new airport at Hokitika. The new Seaview airport opened on 17 December 1951. The opening also marked the extension of the Lodestar service to Westport and onto Wellington southward to Hokitika and the introduction of the larger Lodestar marked the end of NAC services to Greymouth. From this point on a road link between Greymouth town centre and Hokitika Airport was established to connect with NAC's scheduled flights. Hokitika received its first true airliner service on 2 March 1953 when NAC introduced its 24-seater Douglas DC-3 service from Paraparaumu (Wellington being closed for the construction of the new airport), Nelson and Westport.

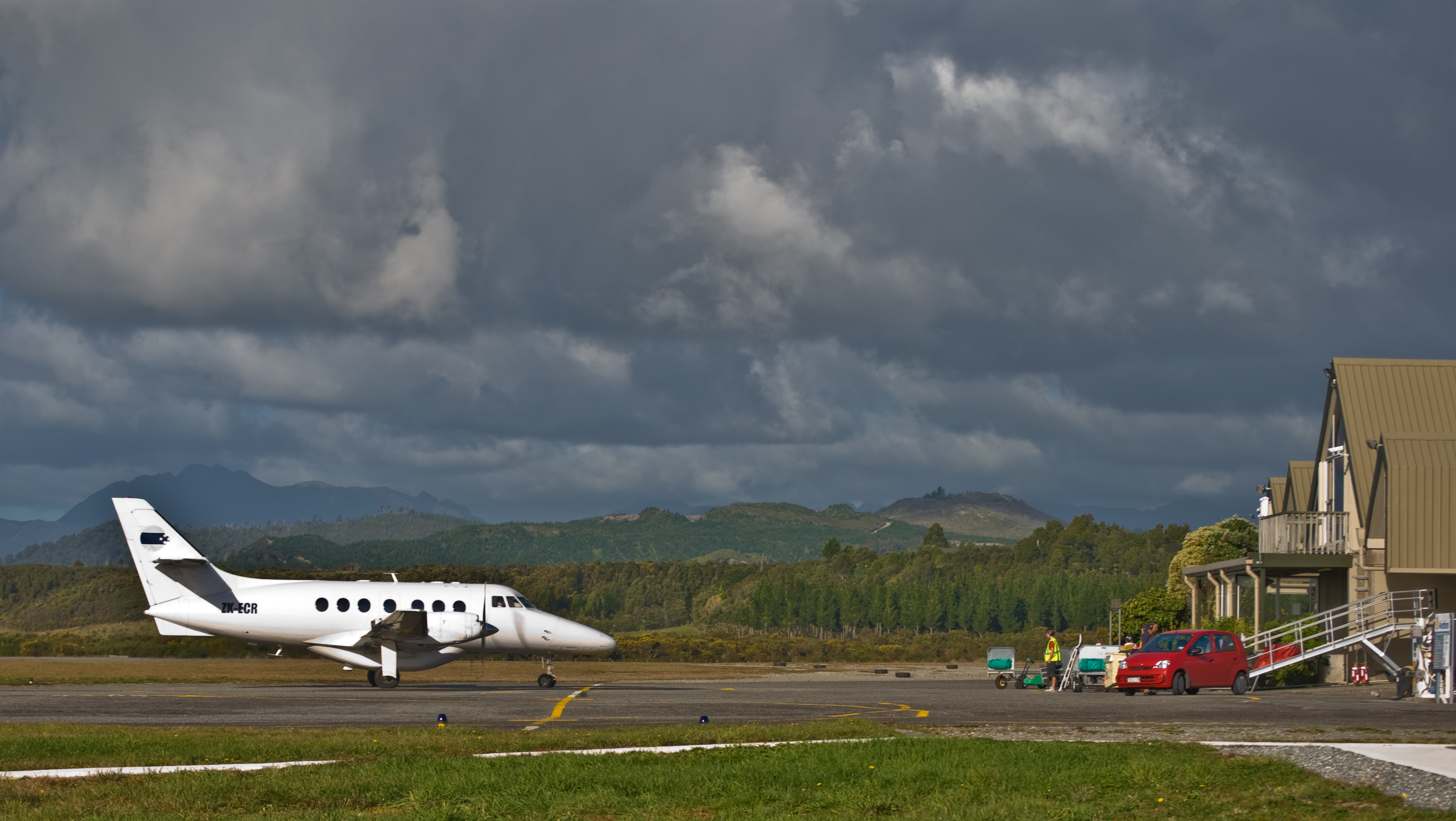
Jetstream 32 ZK-ECR, Hokitika, West Coast, New Zealand

NAC inaugurated its Christchurch-Hokitika Friendship service on 20 December 1968. Fokker Friendship ZK-BXI flew the first flight. By 1974 16,945 people were flying through Hokitika each year and from 14 September 1974 NAC introduced Saturday flights from Hokitika to Christchurch. This was the first time Hokitika had a daily air service.

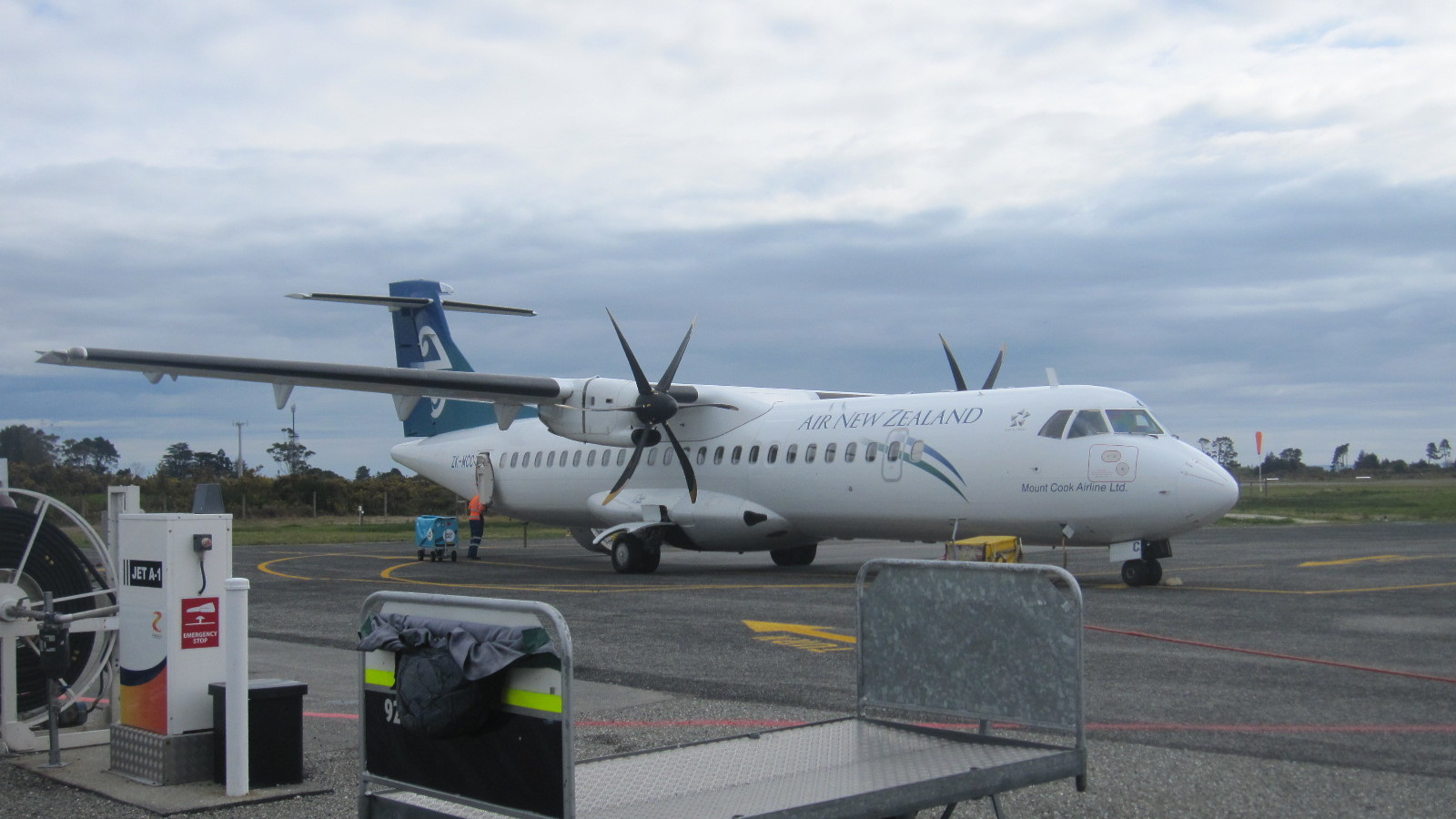
ATR 72 (ZK-MCC) Prepares to return to Christchurch. Taken at Hokitika airport.

== Airlines and destinations ==
Air New Zealand connects Hokitika Airport to Christchurch International Airport.

== Operational information ==
The aerodrome is operated by Destination Westland Ltd. The airport company is owned by the Westland District Council.

The airport has two sealed runways: 03/21 and 12/30. Runway 03/21 is 1,152 m (3,780 ft) long by 30 m (98 ft) wide, with 81 m (266 ft) starter extensions at each end. Runway 12/30 is 1,176 m (3,858 ft) long by 18 m (59 ft) wide.

The airport has a number of car rental firms represented, and a cafe.

== See also ==
- List of airports in New Zealand
- List of airlines of New Zealand
- Transport in New Zealand
