= Wellington Airport =

Airport serving Wellington, New Zealand

Wellington Airport Taunga Rererangi o Te Whanganui-a-Tara

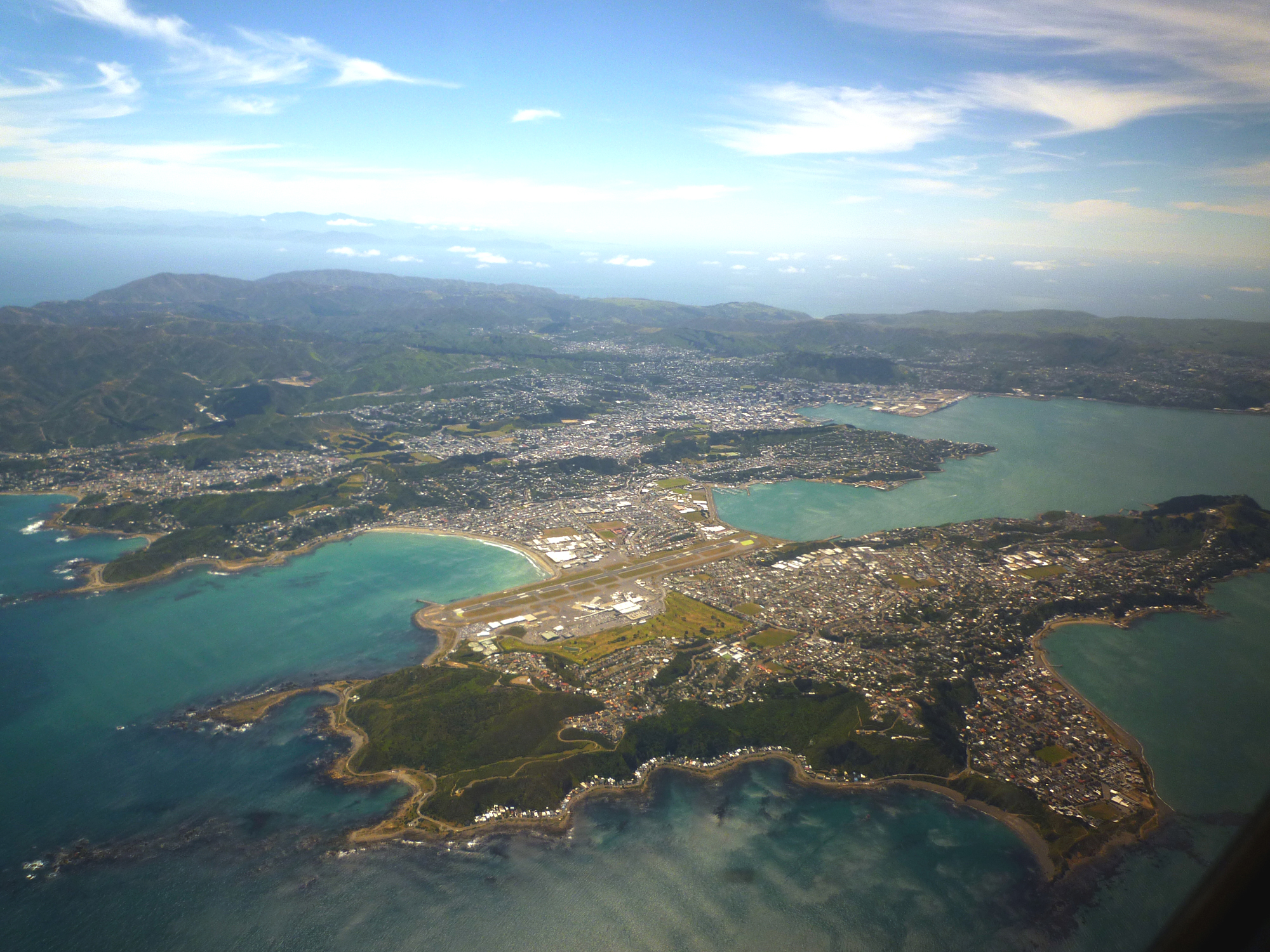
- IATA: WLG; ICAO: NZWN; WMO: 93439

Summary
- Airport type: Public
- Owner: Infratil (66%); Wellington City Council (34%)
- Operator: Wellington International Airport Ltd
- Serves: Wellington
- Location: Rongotai, Wellington, New Zealand
- Opened: 14 November 1929; 97 years ago
- Hub for: Air New Zealand; Sounds Air
- Time zone: NZST (UTC+12:00)
  - Summer (DST): NZDT (UTC+13:00)
- Elevation AMSL: 13 m (43 ft)
- Coordinates: 41°19′38″S 174°48′19″E
- Website: www.wellingtonairport.co.nz

Map
- Location of the Wellington Airport WLG/NZWN (North Island) WLG/NZWN (New Zealand) WLG/NZWN (Oceania)

Runways
Direction	Length		Surface
Direction	m	ft	Surface
16/34	1,947	6,388	Grooved bitumen

Statistics (year ending 30 June 2019)
- Passenger throughput: 6,441,935
- Aircraft movements: 100,696

Wellington Airport (IATA: WLG, ICAO: NZWN) — formerly known as Rongotai Aerodrome or Rongotai Airport — is an international airport located in the suburb of Rongotai in Wellington, the capital of New Zealand. It lies 5.5 km (3.0 nmi; 3.4 mi) south-east from the city centre. It is a hub for Air New Zealand and Sounds Air. Wellington International Airport Limited, a joint venture between Infratil and Wellington City Council, operates the airport. As of 2024, Wellington was the third busiest airport in New Zealand after Auckland and Christchurch, handling 5.4 million passengers in the year ending March 2024, and the third busiest in terms of aircraft movements. The airport, in addition to linking many New Zealand destinations with national and regional carriers, also has links to major cities in eastern Australia. It is the home of some smaller general aviation businesses, including the Wellington Aero Club, which operates from the general aviation area on the western side of the runway.

The airport comprises a small 110-hectare (270-acre) site on the Rongotai isthmus, a stretch of low-lying land between Wellington proper and the hilly Miramar Peninsula. It operates a single 1,815-metre (5,955 ft) runway with ILS in both directions. The airport handles turboprop, narrow-body and wide-body jet aircraft movements. The airport is bordered by residential and commercial areas to the east and west, and by Evans Bay in Wellington Harbour to the north and Cook Strait to the south.

Wellington Airport has a reputation for sometimes rough and turbulent landings, even in larger aircraft, due to the channelling effect of Cook Strait creating strong and gusty winds, especially in pre-frontal north-westerly conditions.

== History ==
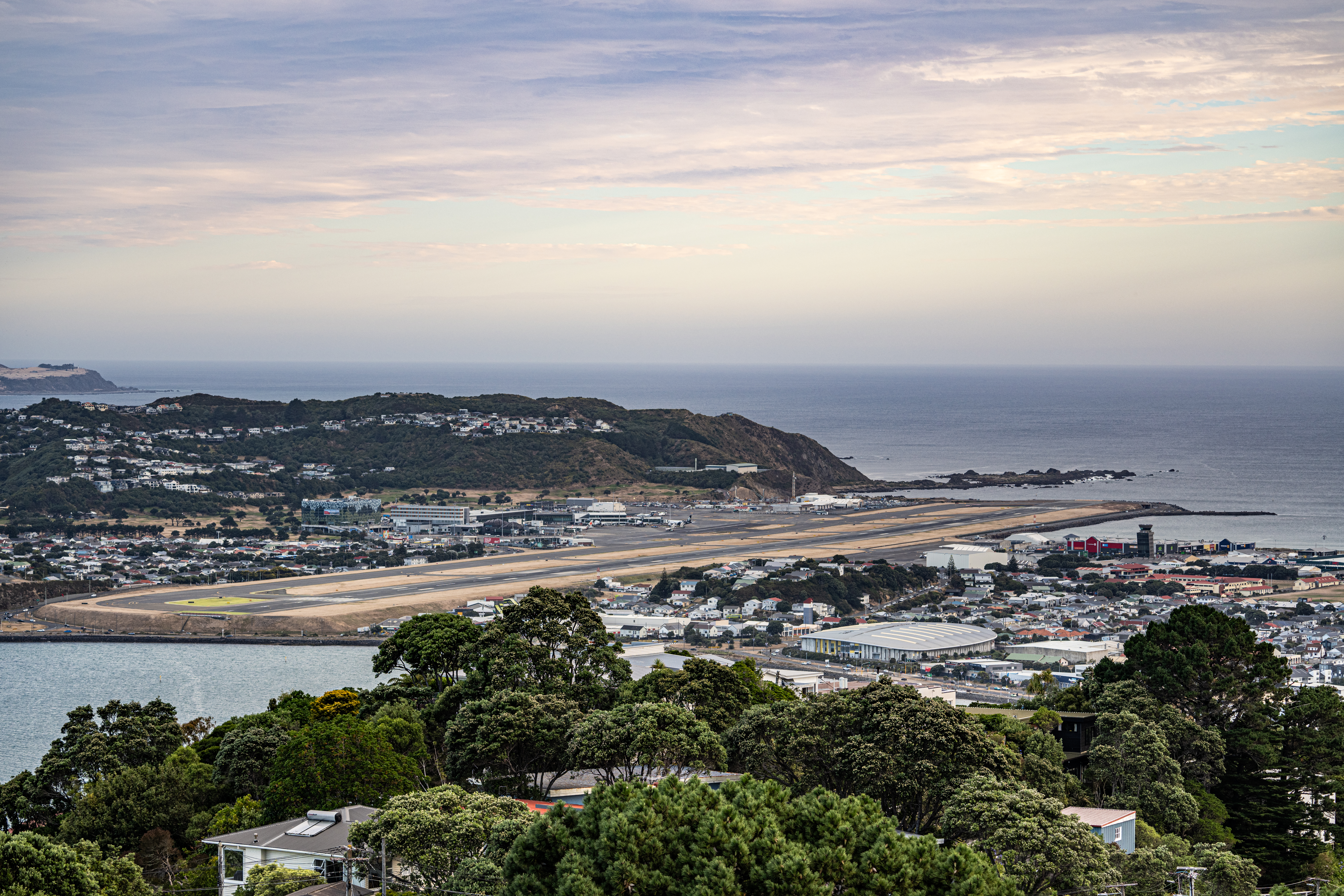
Wellington Airport from Mount Victoria

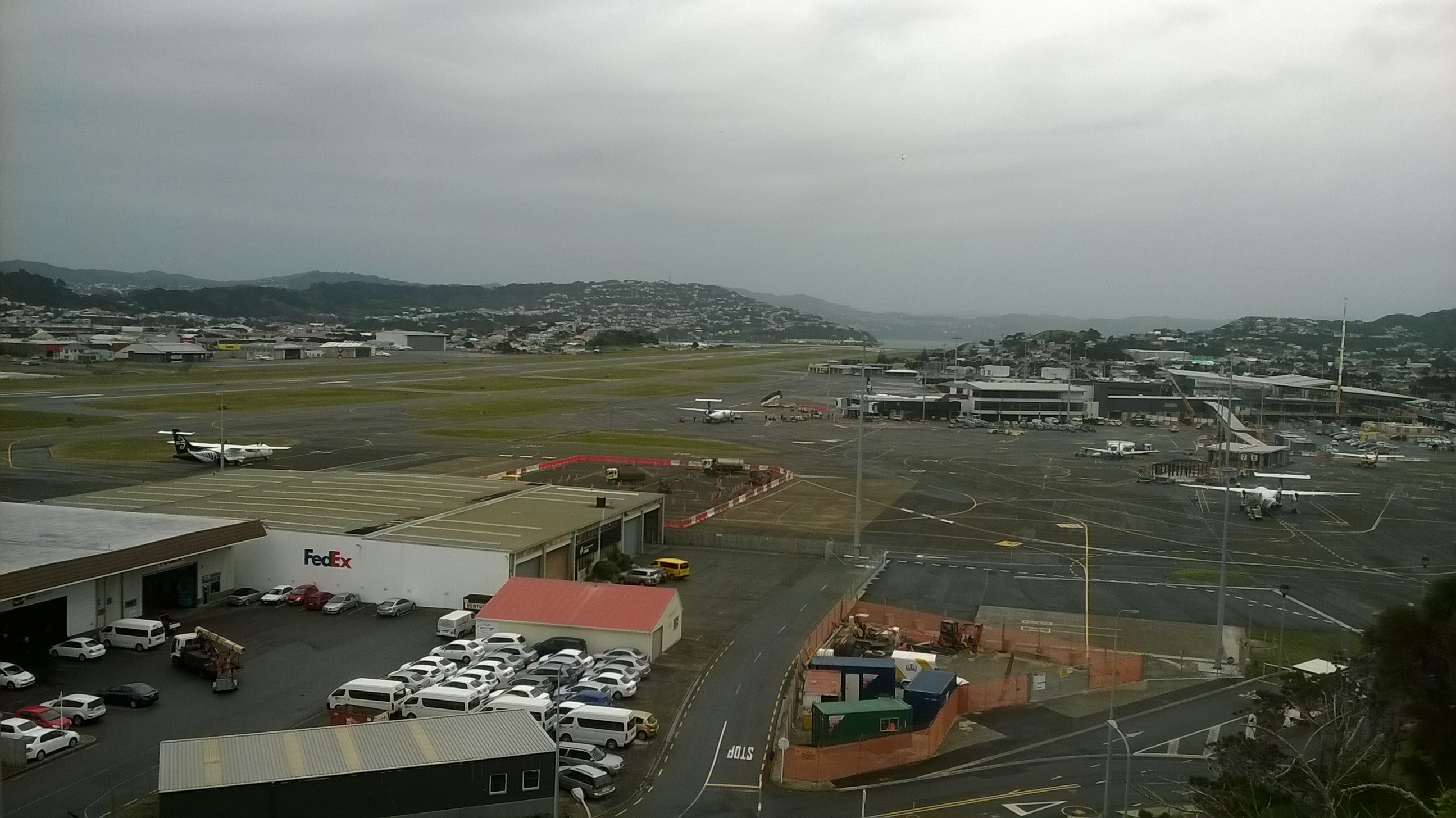
The view looking north of Wellington Airport in July 2015

=== 1929–1947 ===
Wellington Aero Club formed in 1928 and asked Wellington City Council to set aside land for an airport. In October 1928, the Council agreed to the proposal and allocated reserve land at Lyall Bay for the purpose. Up to 150 labourers levelled the sand dunes and laid down a surface of broken rock and clay to stop the sand blowing away. This was then sown with grass. The official opening of the airport took place on 16 November 1929 with flying displays by 15 aeroplanes doing "crazy flying", "bombing" and races.

The runway, which ran in a northwest to southeast alignment to match prevailing winds in the area, was extended in 1933. The first timetabled commercial flights into Rongotai Airport took place on 30 December 1935, when two de Havilland Express biplane airliners of Cook Strait Airways with paying passengers flew in from Nelson and Blenheim.

During this period, concerns about safety were raised. Early aviator Charles Kingsford Smith flew into Wellington and was said to be "perturbed" about conditions at Rongotai, where wind swirled around and the hills were very close. Along with others, he believed that Gear Island at the mouth of the Hutt River in Petone would be a better site for a commercial airport. A scale model of the landscape around the airport was made and tested in a wind tunnel, and, starting in 1936, the height of Moa Point Hill at the eastern end of Lyall Bay was lowered to improve the approach to the runway. In 1937 a government committee investigated possibilities for improving the airport, but its suggestion that a runway be constructed from north to south across the isthmus from Evans Bay to Lyall Bay, which would have entailed removal of Rongotai College and demolition or removal of up to 150 houses, was deemed unpalatable. The runway was extended and other improvements made, but the 1937 committee had warned that the airport was not safe, and finally on 27 September 1947 the airport closed and almost all commercial flights were moved to Paraparaumu Airport, 35 miles (56 km) north of Wellington.

=== 1947–1959 ===
Paraparaumu Airport soon became the country's busiest airport, but it was deemed unsuitable for large aircraft due to adverse terrain. Between 1950 and 1954, TEAL (the forerunner of Air New Zealand) also operated flying boats to Australia from a base in Evans Bay.

Rongotai was still used for a frequent service to Blenheim and Nelson in 14-seater de Havilland Herons. Wellington Aero Club continued to operate from Rongotai, and the airport was also used occasionally by Royal New Zealand Air Force aircraft as well as ambulance aircraft transporting patients to Wellington Hospital. The Aircraft Engineering Company had a flying school with three aeroplanes based at the airport, and the de Havilland Aircraft Company had an aircraft maintenance facility.

With the closure of Rongotai Airport, the government had invited a British commission to report on New Zealand airports. The Tymms Report produced in 1948 recommended that the isthmus at Rongotai was still the best site for an airport in Wellington, and Wellington City Council and the Chamber of Commerce also lobbied for the airport to be retained there. After several options for development were considered, Wellington City Council agreed to the Rongotai Terrace scheme in February 1951. This scheme saved Rongotai College and provided for a north-south runway. A major part of the scheme involved the complete removal of Rongotai Hill. Construction of the airport began in 1953, with the six-year project costing £5 million (equivalent to $366,800,000 in 2026). Spoil from Rongotai Hill was used to reclaim land in Evans Bay and Lyall Bay. About 180 houses at Rongotai Terrace and Wexford Road on the hill were demolished or relocated to the newly reclaimed land at Evans Bay.

Coutts Street had previously been the main road and tram route between Kilbirnie and the Miramar Peninsula, but the new runway cut the street in two. A pedestrian tunnel from Coutts Street to Miramar was built under the runway, and a new road to the peninsula, Cobham Drive, was built on reclaimed land at the head of Evans Bay at the north end of the runway.

=== 1959–present ===
The current airport was officially reopened on 25 October 1959. The original length of the runway was 1,630 metres (5,350 ft), but it was extended in the early 1970s to handle Douglas DC-8s.

In 1991, the airport released plans to widen the taxiway to CAA Code D & E specifications and acquire extra space, which were abandoned after protests from local residents. The plan involved the removal of the nearby Miramar Golf Course and a large number of residential and commercial properties. The airport purchased land from the Miramar Golf Course in 1994 for car park space.

As recently as 1992, several alternate sites for Wellington Airport were considered – Te Horo, Paraparaumu, Mana Island, Ohariu Valley, Horokiwi, Wairarapa and Pencarrow – but a decision was made to upgrade the existing site at Rongotai. A major new domestic terminal was completed in 1999 and integrated with the international terminal, which had been built in 1977. A 90 m safety zone at the south end of the runway was constructed during 2006 in order to comply with ICAO safety regulations, while a similar zone was also put in place at the runway's north end.

In April 2006, Air New Zealand and Qantas announced that they proposed to enter into a codeshare agreement, arguing that it would be necessary in order to reduce empty seats and financial losses on trans-Tasman routes. The airport counter-argued that the codeshare would stifle competition and passenger growth on Wellington's international flights, pointing to what it saw as a market duopoly dominated by Air New Zealand and Qantas. The codeshare was abandoned by the two airlines after it was rejected in a draft ruling by the Australian Competition & Consumer Commission in November 2006.

Fiji Airways began serving Wellington from Nadi on 25 June 2015. Australian airline Jetstar launched its first international service in December 2014 from Wellington to the Gold Coast.

On 21 September 2016 Singapore Airlines began direct flights between Singapore and Wellington via Australia's capital city Canberra. It was Wellington's first direct flight to a destination outside Australia and the Pacific Islands. From April 2018, the Singapore Airlines flight began transiting via Melbourne rather than Canberra. The flights were terminated in 2020 following the COVID-19 outbreak.

Execujet (in conjunction with Capital Jet services) operates a FBO and hangar facility for corporate jets and visiting general aviation aircraft on the western apron. Other notable operators on the western apron include Life Flight, the RNZAF and the Wellington Aero Club.

Beginning in 2002, the airport built a bulk retail centre on land it owned to the west of the airport. Between 2009 and 2019 the airport issued various plans outlining upgrades over the next 20 years, including expanded terminal and apron space, runway extensions, terminal extensions, new freight facilities and a relocated fire station. In 2018, a nine-storey car park with more than 1,000 parking spaces was opened, and in 2019 a 134-room hotel opened at the airport, with direct access from the terminal.

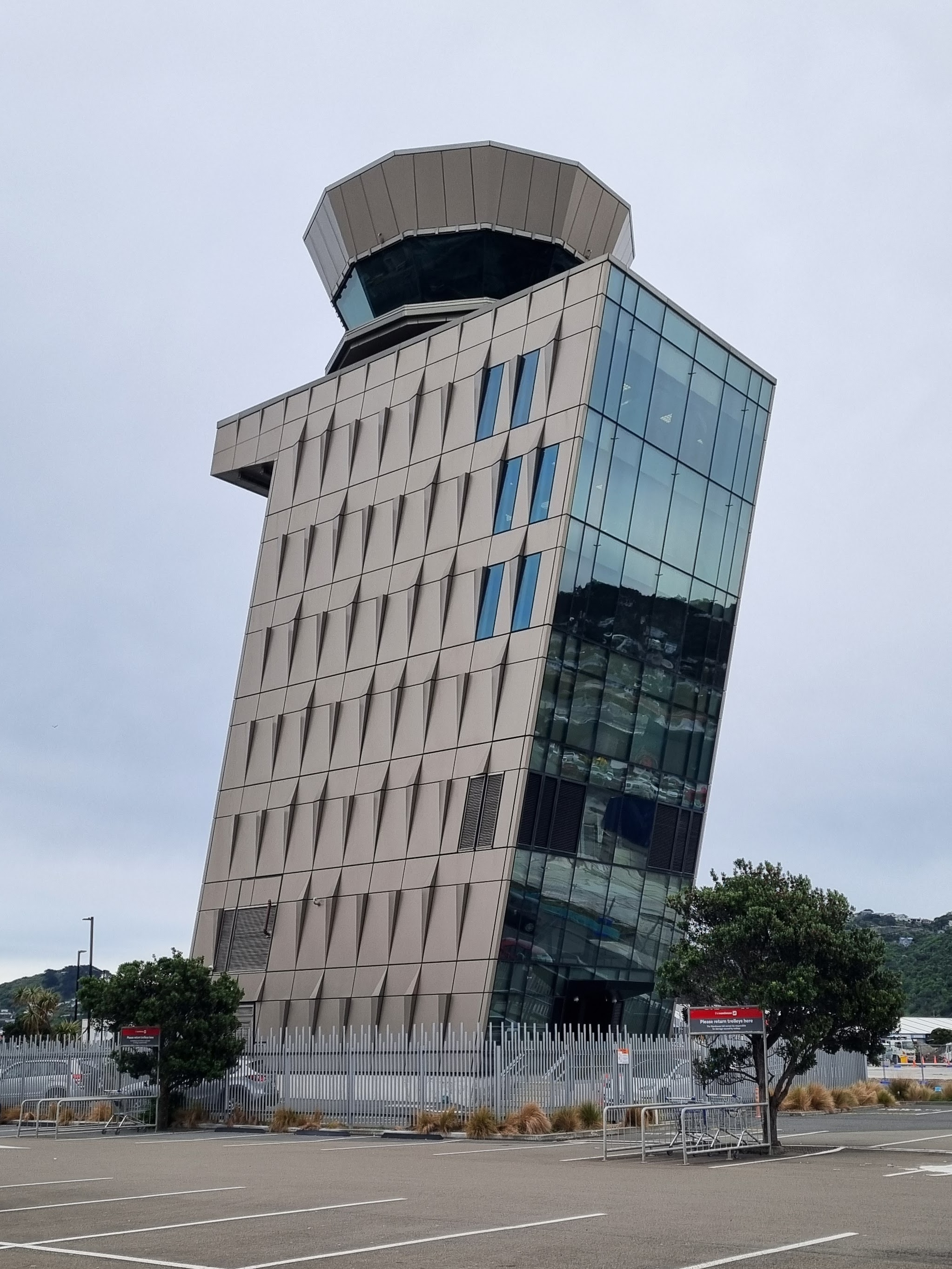
The new air traffic control tower, built on an angle as if leaning into the wind

In 2018, a new air traffic control tower opened next to the airport retail centre. The building was designed by Studio Pacific Architecture and Paris Magdalinos Architects. The eight-storey building is constructed on a 12.5 degree angle as if leaning into the prevailing northerly wind, and is built to stand up to a 10-metre high tsunami wave. The former control tower at Tirangi Road was put up for sale by Airways New Zealand, but was found to be unsuitable for redevelopment due to structural issues and asbestos contamination. Wellington Airport bought the building and it was demolished in 2021.

Since 1998 the airport has been two-thirds privately owned by Infratil, with the remaining third owned by Wellington City Council. In late May 2024, Wellington City Council voted in favour of selling its 34% minority stake (worth NZ$278 million) in Wellington Airport, with the proceeds going towards a major disaster investment fund. However, the sale was halted in October the same year, after a majority of councillors backed out of the deal.

On 22 November 2024, Wellington Airport announced a rebrand and a NZ$500 million investment in infrastructure over five years. The plan includes the installation of an Engineered materials arrestor system (EMAS) at each runway end, upgrades to the terminal, and new community spaces in Lyall Bay.

== Terminal ==
=== Development ===
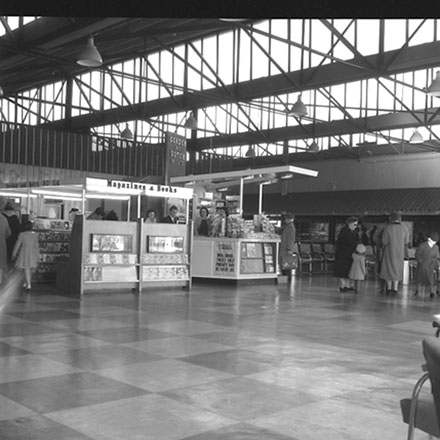
The former terminal built inside a converted aircraft hangar (1960)

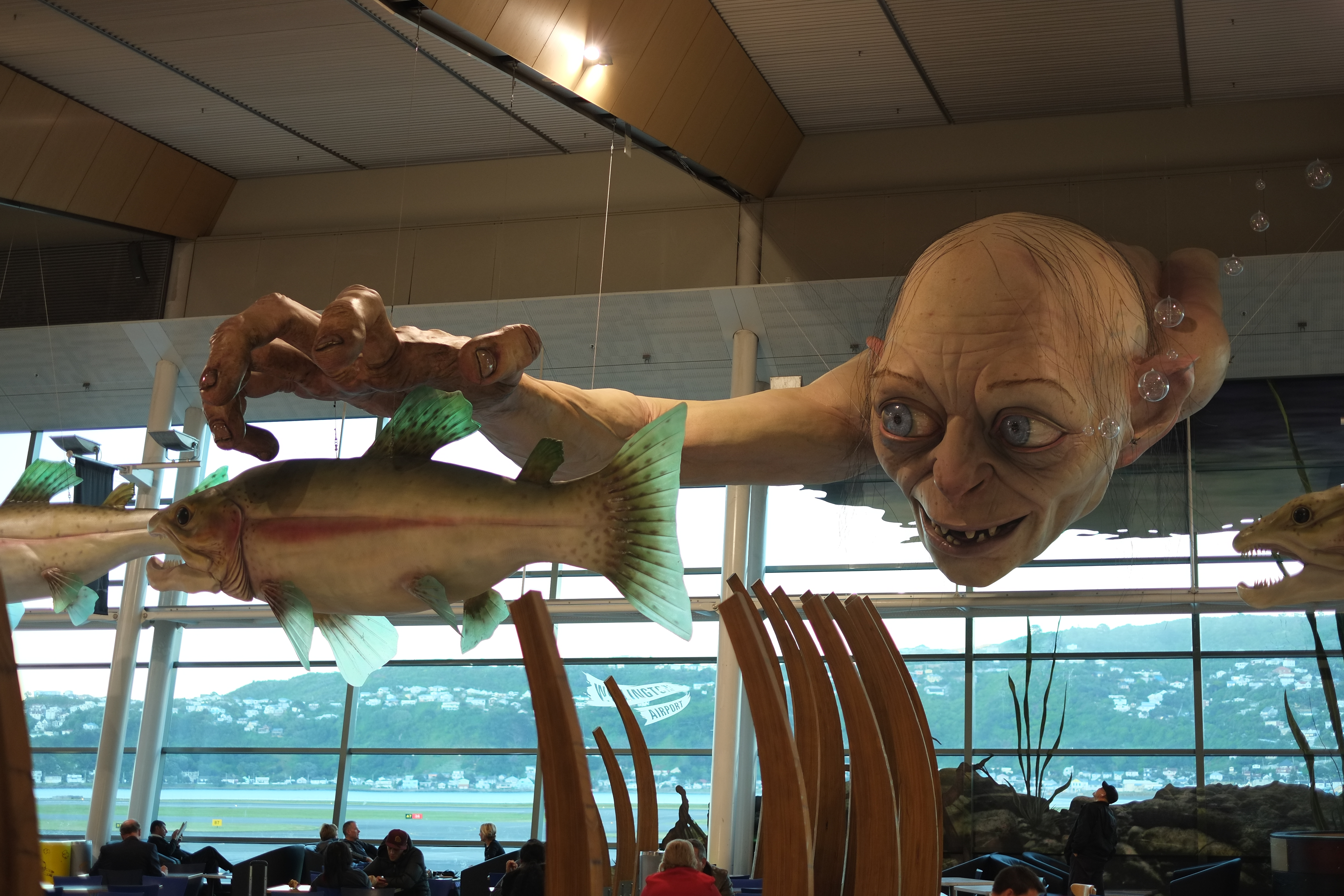
Gollum sculpture inside the terminal

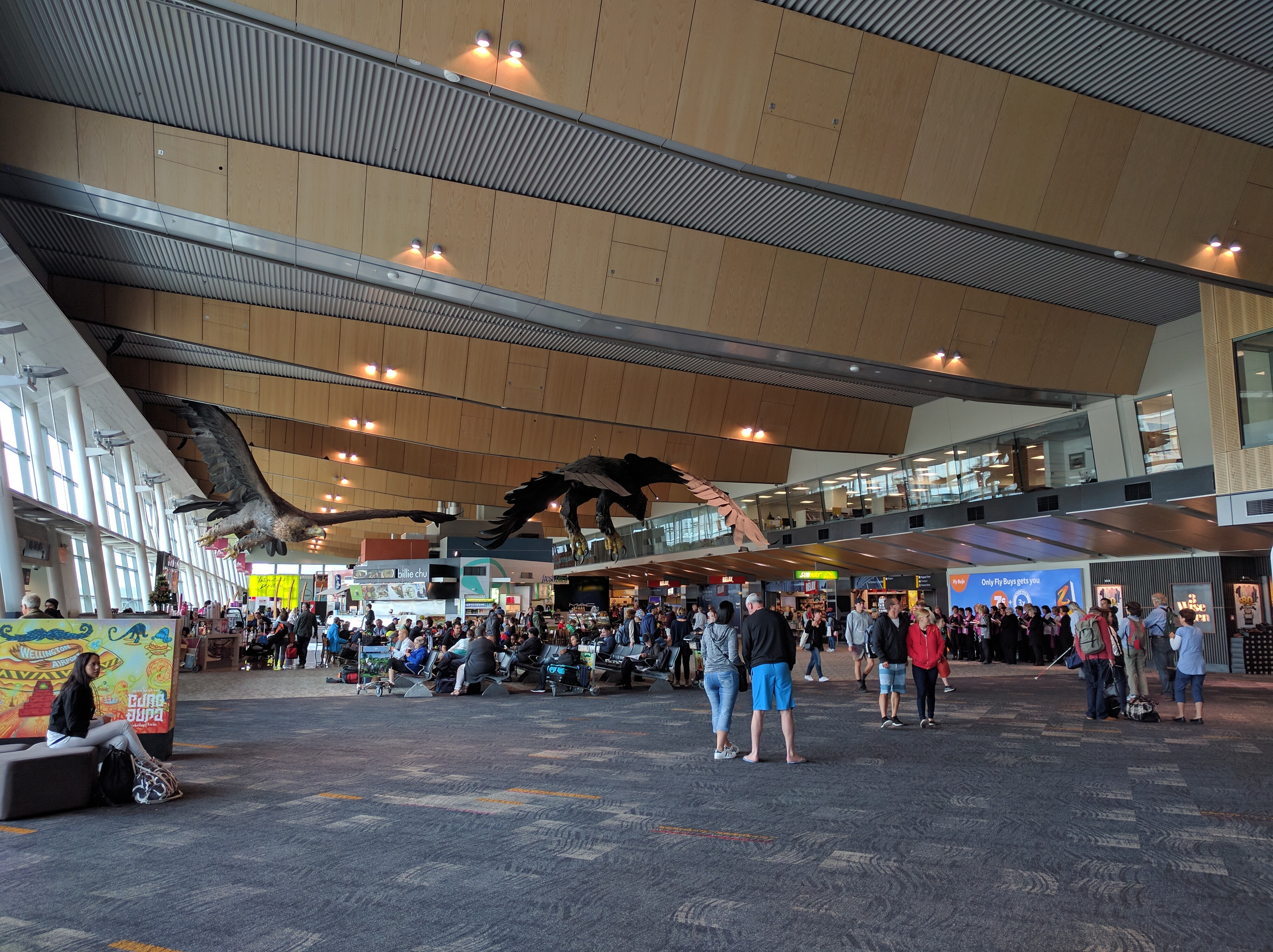
Main departures area

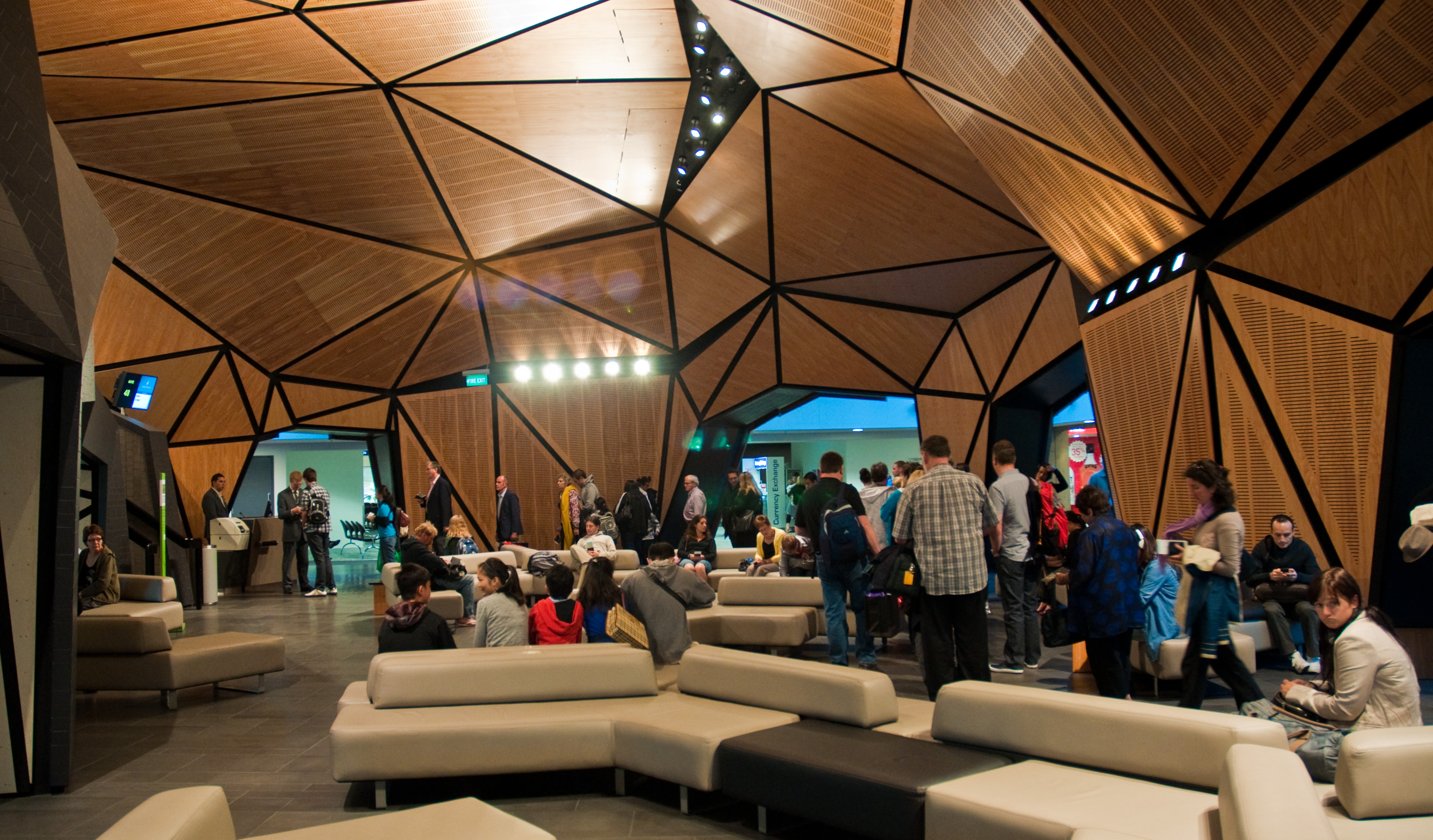
'The Rock' international gate waiting area

Wellington's original domestic terminal was built as a temporary measure inside an existing corrugated iron hangar, originally used to assemble de Havilland aircraft. It was known for being overcrowded, leaky and draughty.

An international terminal was opened in 1977. An upgrade of the domestic terminal, budgeted at NZ$10 million, was announced in 1981, but by 1983 the plans were shelved after cost projections more than doubled. The terminal was extensively refurbished in 1987 by Air New Zealand, and Ansett New Zealand built a new terminal as an extension to the international terminal when it commenced competing domestic air services in 1987.

In 1999 a new domestic terminal opened, linked to the international terminal. Designed by architect Jon Craig from Craig Craig Moller, the three-storey terminal has an open-plan retail, refreshment and seating area with a long glass wall overlooking the runway. Five new airbridges were also included in the development. In 2003, the airport installed a large statue of Gollum on the outside of the terminal in order to promote the world premiere of The Lord of the Rings: The Return of the King. This Gollum was later removed, and a new sculpture of Gollum catching a fish was installed inside the terminal. In 2013 two one-tonne eagles with wingspans of 15 metres were installed inside the terminal to promote the second film in The Hobbit film series. Wētā Workshop contributed another Hobbit art installation in 2014—a statue of Smaug the dragon. In 2025, the eagles were replaced with another Wētā Workshop sculpture of Te Manu Muramura, a local mythological spirit bird of Wellington Harbour.

On 19 February 2008, Wellington Airport announced the proposed design for a new, expanded international terminal. The design, by Studio Pacific Architecture and Warren and Mahoney, was a deliberate departure from traditional airport terminal design. Featuring round structures covered in weathered copper, the design aroused a great deal of controversy and was nicknamed "The Rock". "The Rock" opened in October 2010.

In 2022, Fulton Hogan commenced work on rebuilding the apron.

=== Facilities ===
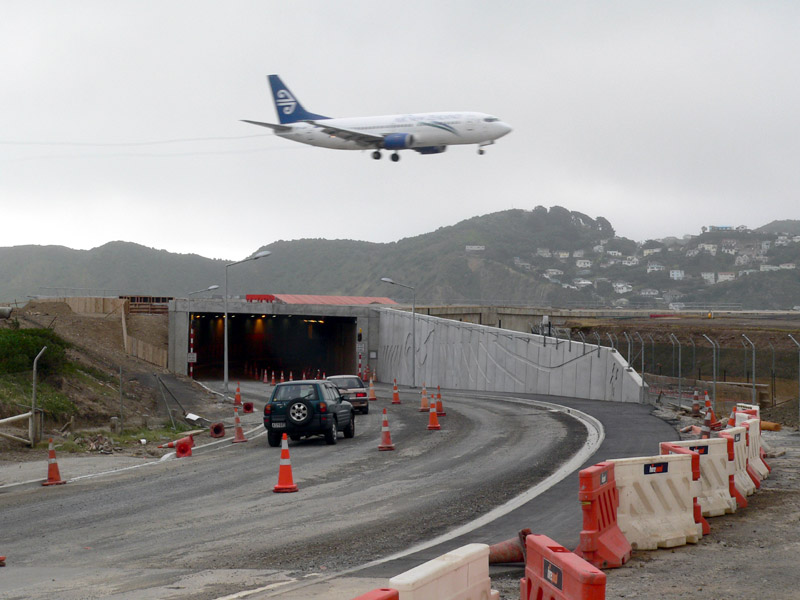
An Air New Zealand Boeing 737 landing in 2006, with construction of the south end runway safety area in the foreground

Wellington Airport's terminal at the east of the airport has three piers: south, south-west and north-west. The terminal and piers have a total floor area of 32,300 square metres (348,000 sq ft). The main terminal building contains a common check-in area on the first floor and a common baggage claim area on the ground floor. Both connect to a retail and refreshment area on the first floor, looking out onto the runway.

The gates in the south pier (Gates 3 to 12) and the gates in the main terminal building (Gates 18 to 20) serve regional aircraft. The gates in the south-west pier (Gates 13 to 17) are predominantly used by Air New Zealand domestic jets, and with the exception of Gate 14, all are jetbridge gates. The gates in the north-west pier (Gates 21 to 29) are used by Jetstar domestic jets and all international flights: when transferred to international use, these gates are referred to as Gates 41 to 49 (e.g. Gate 26 is referred to as Gate 46 when used for an international flight).

Air New Zealand operates three lounges for Koru members: the Regional Lounge on the second floor of the main terminal for members travelling regionally on turboprop aircraft, the Domestic Lounge located after security screening in the south-west pier for members travelling domestically on Air New Zealand jet aircraft, and the International Lounge located after outbound passport control in the north-west pier for members travelling internationally. Qantas also operates a lounge after outbound passport control in the north-west pier; the lounge is available to Qantas Club members departing on international flights.

== Operations ==
Wellington Airport has one runway: 16/34. As of 2024 the runway is 1,815 m (5,955 ft) long threshold to threshold; with displaced thresholds at each end, the take-off run available is 1,945 m (6,381 ft) for runway 16 and 1,921 m (6,302 ft) for runway 34. The runway is grooved, which improves performance of the runway during wet conditions. In 2025 the airport began installation of an engineered materials arrestor system (EMAS), to increase the effective runway length to 1,947 metres (6,388 ft) in both directions. This was completed in March 2026.

The airport has a night curfew from midnight to 6:00 am, although international arrivals are allowed as late as 1:00 am and there are numerous conditions and exceptions to the curfew, e.g. air ambulances are not subject to the curfew. In 2011, Qantas subsidiary Jetconnect was fined $12,000 after a delayed flight from Sydney landed at 1:47 am.

As of 2025, the airport handles over 70,000 aircraft movements each year, of which 92.4% are domestic flights. 5.32 million passengers pass through the airport each year, of which 85.1% are domestic travellers.

=== Flight disruptions ===
About 2% of scheduled flights are cancelled each year. The main cause of flight disruptions at Wellington Airport is weather, and in particular winds over 100km/h. Cross winds are rare, but westerlies may cause turbulence. Spring is the windiest season, although some years are windier than others. In 2013, over 2280 flights were cancelled, including 430 cancellations in October 2013, compared to the October average of 96 cancellations. A typical example of disruption caused by wind is a flight from Auckland in October 2026, which arrived at Wellington but could not land and returned to Auckland. Its replacement had to make two landing attempts before landing safely. The wind at Wellington airport is celebrated in the design of the control tower, which leans into the wind, and the Wellington Blown Away sign on a hill near the runway.

Fog and low visibility occasionally cause disruptions. Other causes of disruptions are technical or operational issues, air traffic congestion at peak times, late-arriving aircraft and problems caused by crew scheduling.

== Air Movements Rongotai ==
Air Movements Rongotai sits on the opposite side of the Wellington airport runway from the main passenger terminals, its main use being the facilitation of Royal New Zealand Air Force (RNZAF) flights and flights of overseas military forces. The current building was refurbished in the late 1980s when it housed not only the RNZAF Air movements unit but also 2 MCU (2nd Movements Control Unit) of the New Zealand Army. The role of 2 MCU was the logistic control and movement of defence personal and freight throughout New Zealand and abroad, utilising both civilian and military modes of transport.

== Airlines and destinations ==
Airlines	Destinations
Air Chathams	Chatham Islands
Air New Zealand	Auckland, Blenheim, Brisbane, Christchurch, Dunedin, Gisborne, Hamilton, Melbourne, Napier, Nelson, New Plymouth, Queenstown, Rotorua, Sydney–Kingsford Smith, Tauranga, Timaru
Fiji Airways	Nadi
Golden Bay Air	Tākaka
Jetstar	Auckland, Christchurch, Gold Coast, Queenstown
Originair	Blenheim, Nelson, Westport
Qantas	Brisbane, Melbourne, Sydney–Kingsford Smith
QantasLink	Brisbane
Sounds Air	Blenheim, Nelson, Picton

== Statistics ==
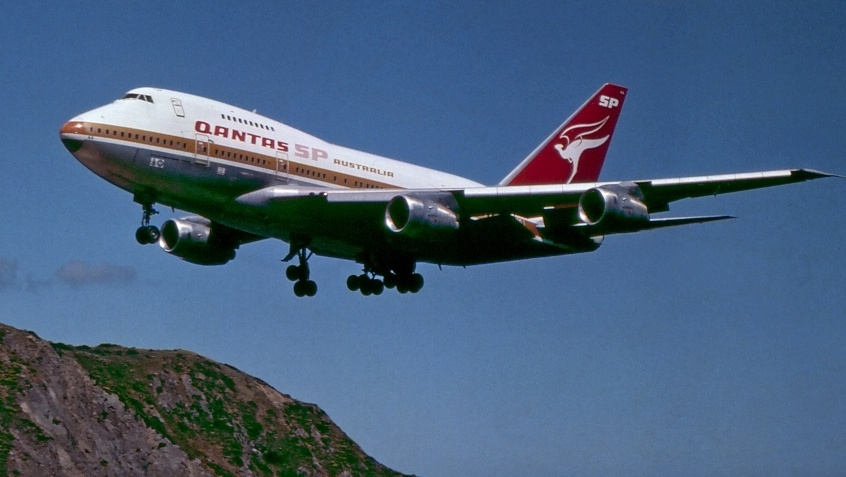
Qantas Boeing 747SP at Wellington Airport, 1984

Annual passenger traffic for Wellington Airport (2013 - 2025)
Year	Domestic	International	Total	Change
2013	4,732,838	750,110	5,482,948	Steady
2014	4,654,711	765,604	5,420,315	▼ -1.1%
2015	4,816,332	873,029	5,689,361	▲5.0%
2016	5,066,291	892,199	5,958,490	▲4.7%
2017	5,216,893	897,765	6,114,658	▲2.6%
2018	5,416,842	920,223	6,337,165	▲3.6%
2019	5,463,485	948,447	6,411,932	▲1.2%
2020	3,130,371	209,502	3,339,873	▼ -47.9%
2021	3,721,803	48,518	3,770,321	▲12.9%
2022	4,262,829	381,888	4,644,717	▲23.2%
2023	4,685,719	708,089	5,393,808	▲6.7%
2024	4,605,359	792,903	5,398,262	▲0.1%
2025	4,304,515	822,198	5,126,713	▼ -5.5%

Busiest international routes to and from WLG (2023)
Rank	Airport	Passengers
1	Sydney–Kingsford Smith	309,992
2	Melbourne	186,012
3	Brisbane	114,618
4	Gold Coast	62,385
5	Nadi	36,133

== Ongoing issues and development ==
=== Runway ===
The length of the runway has limited the size of aircraft that can use the airport on a commercial basis, and non-stop overseas destinations are limited to southeastern Australia and the South Pacific. Most large jet aircraft can safely use Wellington but the short runway severely limits their range to short-haul flights, and passenger numbers on trans-Tasman routes generally do not justify the use of wide-body aircraft. Air New Zealand has occasionally used wide-body aircraft to cater for high-demand events such as major sports fixtures, and the airport has seen a number of wide-body movements over the years for heads of state and visiting foreign dignitaries, diversions or special promotional events. Singapore Airlines formerly operated a Wellington-Melbourne-Singapore flight four times per week, using an Airbus A350-900. After Elton John performed a concert in Wellington in 2006, his equipment was transported to and shipped out of RNZAF Base Ohakea as Wellington Airport had insufficient runway length to handle the task.

A full-length runway extension to accommodate long-haul international flights has been previously investigated, but would require expensive land reclamation into Lyall Bay, and massive breakwater protection from Cook Strait. Doubts have existed over the viability of such an undertaking, particularly as Air New Zealand has repeatedly indicated that it has no interest in pursuing international service beyond Australia and the Pacific Islands, and few international airlines have shown serious interest in providing services beyond those points. Air New Zealand has questioned potential demand for such flights, citing the axing of its Christchurch-Los Angeles route in early 2006. Regional business organisations and the airport have put forward their case to various international airlines for long-haul operations to and from Wellington, pointing out that Christchurch's economy is mainly industrial and agricultural, while arguing that Wellington's economy is based mainly on what they see as the higher-value public service, financial, ICT, and creative sectors. In particular, a survey commissioned by the Wellington Chamber of Commerce found that respondents regarded the airport's limited international capacity as the biggest obstacle to the Wellington region's economic potential, by a long margin over other factors. It has also been pointed out that while Air New Zealand has been scaling back certain routes, it is adding others, most notably Auckland-Shanghai from 6 November 2006.

According to WIAL in 2009, the forthcoming Boeing 787 and Airbus A350 were originally predicted to have improved runway performance over existing long-haul aircraft, opening up the possibility of direct air links to Asia and the Americas if commercially viable. However, when the B787 was introduced into service, it was found that the "actual performance was not as favourable as was originally envisaged", prompting a decision to extend the north end of the runway. In 2011, the Wellington City Council, Mayor Celia Wade-Brown and local business leaders reiterated their support for lengthening the runway, as part of the Airport's 2030 Long Term Plan, but questions were raised about a possible conflict of interest regarding the then incumbent Mayor's role on Infratil's board of directors. The same year, Upper Hutt mayor Wayne Guppy called for further action on a runway extension, with a spokesman for the airport confirming a proposal to lengthen the southern end of the runway by 300 m at an estimated cost of $1 million a metre which could start early 2015. In 2013, United Arab Emirates-based airline Emirates said it would consider Wellington as a destination while the airport operator said 1000 people connect with long-haul flights to and from the capital each day. Also in 2013, China Southern Airlines expressed interest in starting a Guangzhou to Wellington service.

In late 2014, the Airport and the Wellington City Council jointly opened the Web site Connect Wellington to promote the case for a runway extension.

In January 2016, Singapore Airlines announced that it would begin services to Wellington via Canberra. The route, dubbed "The Capital Express", flew to Wellington via Canberra four times a week, using a Boeing 777-200 aircraft. The 777-200 was able to use Wellington Airport because the amount of fuel needed to fly between Wellington and Canberra was relatively small; it could not take off from Wellington Airport if it carried the fuel required to fly non-stop to Singapore. The Deputy Mayor of Wellington argued that Singapore Airlines' commitment to the capital helped the case for an airport runway extension, and showed that airlines are looking to fly to Wellington and that the extension would cater for that in the future. In 2018, the Capital Express route was redirected via Melbourne instead of Canberra. In 2019, Singapore Airlines announced that they would replace the 777-200 aircraft with the A350-900, starting on 1 November 2019.

On 8 May 2024, the airport announced a pause on plans for a runway extension, in order to get consent to rebuild the southern seawall. In 2025 the airport began installation of an engineered materials arrestor system (EMAS), to increase the effective runway length to 1,947 metres (6,388 ft) in both directions.

=== Boeing 747SP era ===
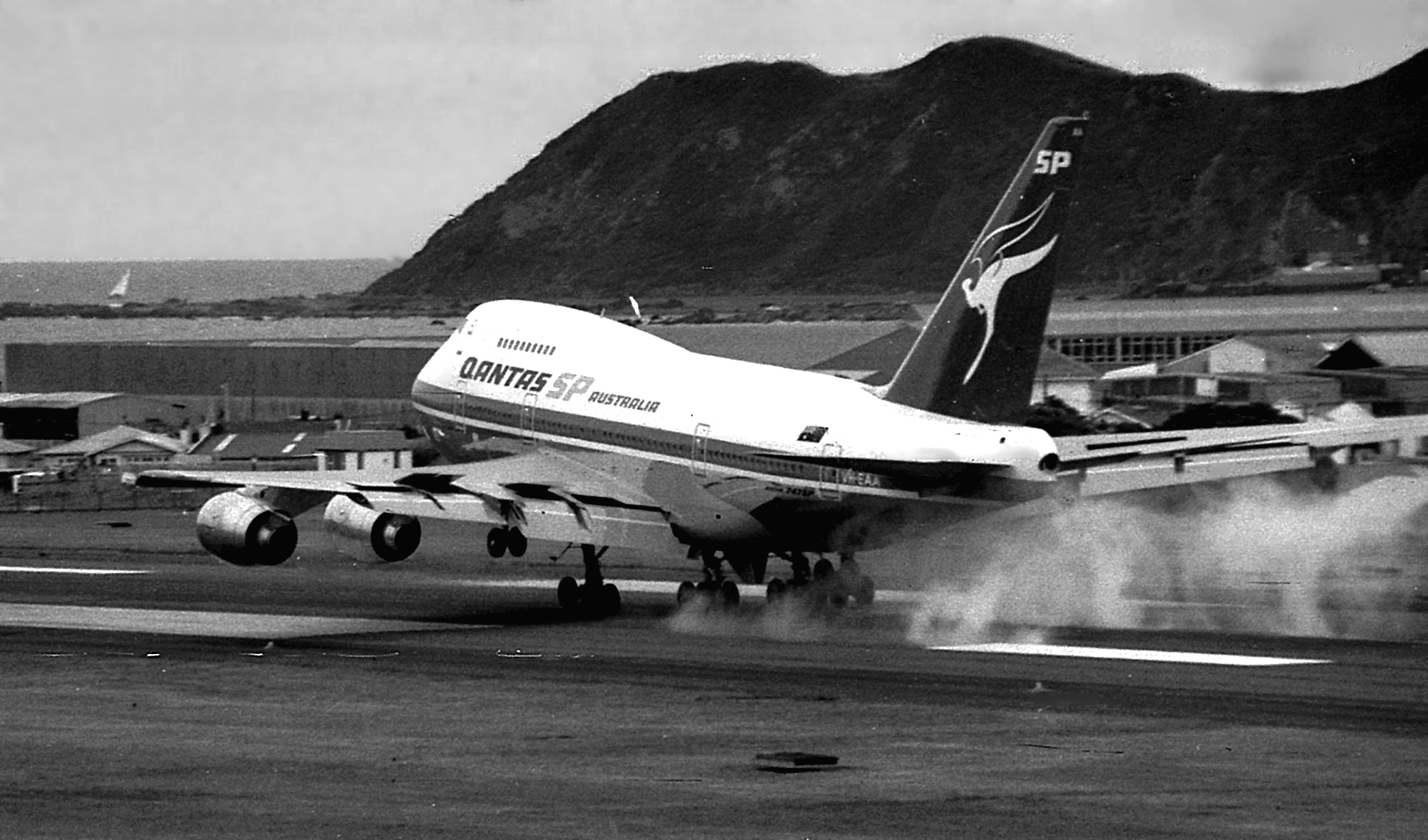
The first Boeing 747 to land at Wellington Airport, a Qantas Boeing 747SP, touches down in 1981.

Because of the runway limitations, Qantas introduced Boeing 747SPs on flights between Wellington and Australia in 1981; the 747SP has a much shorter fuselage than other 747 variants. Air New Zealand operated Douglas DC-8s from Wellington on trans-Tasman routes, but when they were retired in 1981 none of its other aircraft were capable of operating international flights from Wellington – Air New Zealand's McDonnell Douglas DC-10s required more runway length than Wellington had available, and twinjets such as the Boeing 737-200 were not yet ETOPS-certified.

The 747SP addressed this gap in the market, with Air New Zealand (after turning down an offer to purchase the type) code-sharing with Qantas. Special markings on the runway assisted Qantas pilots, to indicate where to touch down and to abort and go round to attempt a landing again. The 747SP service to Wellington continued until 1985, when Qantas and later Air New Zealand took delivery of the more capable and economical Boeing 767-200ER type.

During this time Pan Am took an interest in the operation of 747SPs into the capital and proposed a possible long-range service to the US via Hawaii. However, the New Zealand Government refused Pan Am's request for the route, citing Auckland Airport as the main gateway for overseas flights and the ability to generate passenger numbers amongst other things.

== Access ==
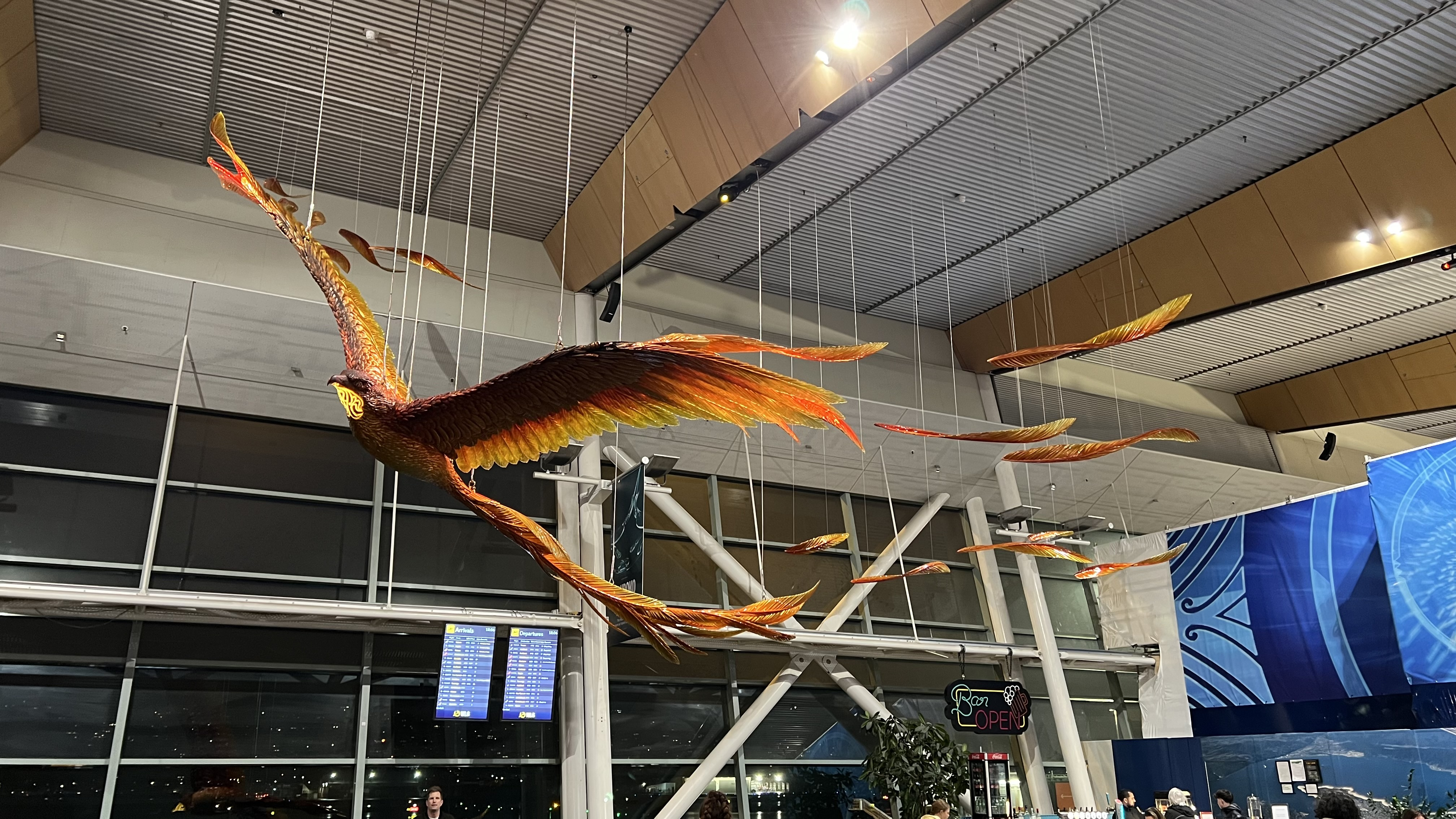
Manu muramura sculpture in the terminal

Wellington Airport is only accessed by road. The airport lies at the southern end of the North Island section of State Highway 1, which connects the airport to Wellington City via the Mount Victoria Tunnel. SH 1 then continues to the Wellington Urban Motorway, which takes traffic out of the city and further afield to Porirua and the Kāpiti Coast, and also onwards to the Hutt Valley and the Wairarapa via State Highway 2. The distance from the airport to the city centre is roughly 8 km (5.0 mi). Several taxi and shuttle companies serve the airport.

Metlink bus route 2 (between the CBD and Miramar/Seatoun) has a stop within walking distance of the terminal and connects to Metlink train services at Wellington railway station. The Metlink Airport Express bus service, which began on 1 July 2022, links the Wellington CBD directly with Wellington Airport.

Public transport to the airport is limited to buses as the airport is quite distant from the Wellington railway station, making it difficult to link Wellington Airport to the CBD via a rail link. Feasibility studies, such as the Greater Wellington Regional Council's Ngauranga to Wellington Airport Corridor Plan, have been carried out to address this gap in the network, with light rail being touted as a solution by some public transport advocates.

== Incidents ==
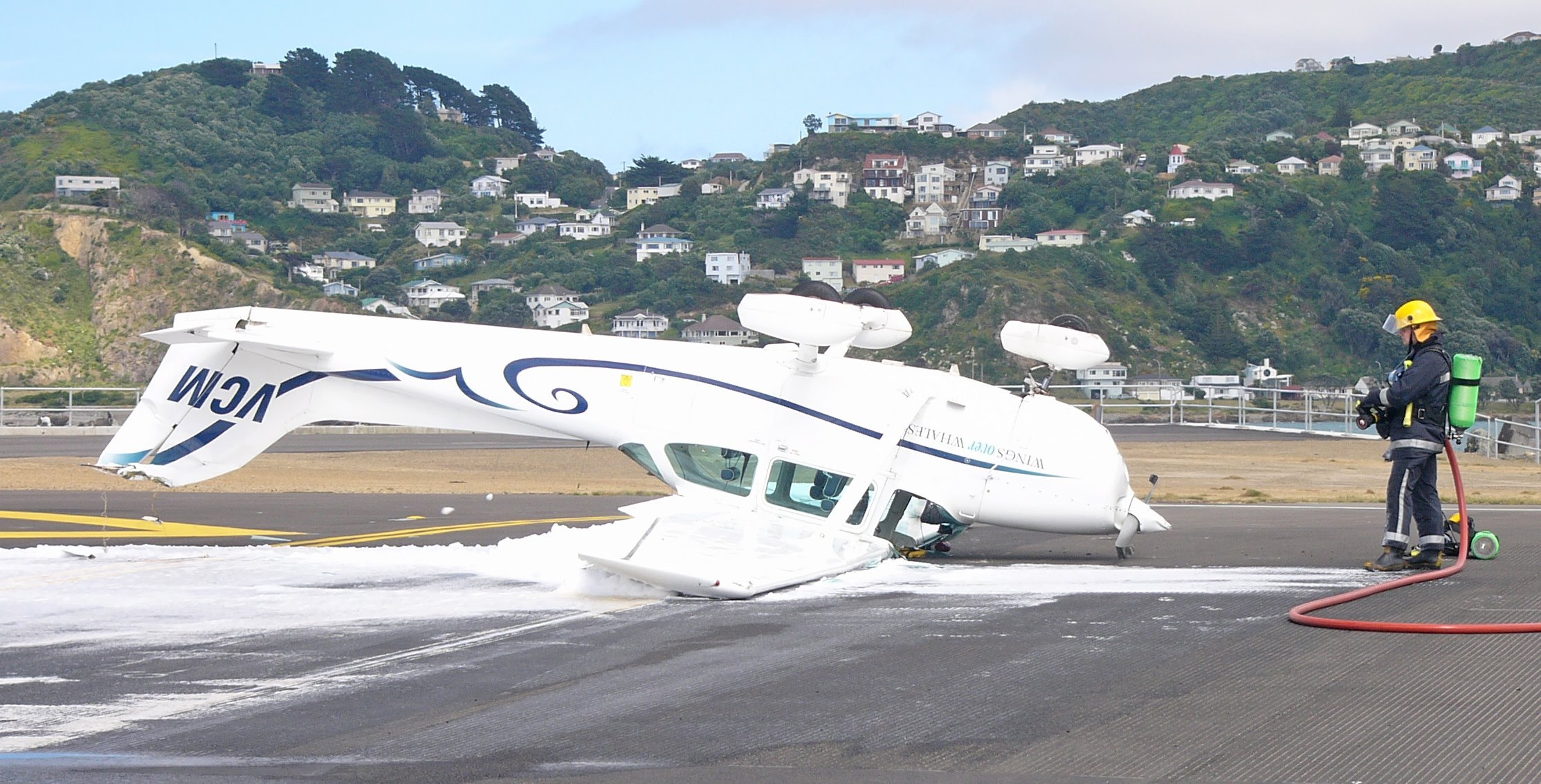
Cessna 172 upturned by strong winds in 2007

In spite of the short runway and frequent winds, there have been very few safety incidents at the airport, with the following exceptions:

- At the air show held on opening day in 1959 there were two significant incidents. An RNZAF Short Sunderland flying boat scraped its keel along the runway during a low pass in turbulent conditions; it returned to its base at Hobsonville and was beached for repair. An Avro Vulcan bomber of the Royal Air Force aborted its landing when it touched down short of the runway, damaging its left main landing gear drag link and the wing attachments, and rupturing engine fuel lines; the aircraft flew to Ohakea air base where it was stranded for several months being repaired.
- On Tuesday 8 October 1991 a United Airlines Boeing 747-122, registered N4728U, made an emergency landing after its intended destination, Auckland Airport, was closed by fog. It was estimated that if the aircraft had continued to its planned alternate destination, Christchurch, it would have had an unacceptable 15 minutes of fuel on board.

== See also ==
- List of airports in New Zealand
- List of airlines of New Zealand
- Transport in New Zealand
- List of busiest airports in New Zealand
