= Studio Pacific Architecture =

Studio Pacific Architecture is a Wellington architecture and urban design practice known for its work across civic, cultural, commercial, and residential sectors, established in 1992. The firm has received multiple regional and national architecture awards, and international awards. Its projects have been recognised for design excellence, heritage conservation, and sustainable innovation.

== History ==
Studio Pacific Architecture was founded in Wellington by architects and friends Evžen Novák, Nick Barratt-Boyes, and Stephen McDougall. The practice developed as a multidisciplinary studio, integrating architecture, interior design, urban design and heritage expertise. Over time, the firm contributed to public and institutional developments and expanded its portfolio beyond the capital and undertook projects throughout New Zealand.

In 2025 architect Marc Woodbury became the firm's Executive Director. The practice uses a studio model that emphasizing teamwork and shared authorship rather than a singular design lead. It has also collaborated with other architecture and landscape architecture firms.

== Projects ==
The firm's portfolio includes educational facilities, transport infrastructure, apartment developments, and commercial office buildings. It has contributed to the design and redevelopment of major civic spaces in Wellington and has collaborated with government agencies on public buildings. It has also been involved in mixed-use urban regeneration projects and the design of new town centres.

The practice has incorporated environmental performance and sustainability principles, including energy efficiency and adaptive reuse. A number of its projects have been awarded Green Star Ratings from the New Zealand Green Building Council, including the Meridian Building in Wellington, New Zealand's first 5 Green Star building.

The practice has used timber in its work, including Hangar 4 at Auckland Airport, which used prefabricated timber trusses, each weighing 38 tonnes, the terminal at Nelson Airport (2018) and the parliamentary building behind the Beehive in Wellington, also using a pre-fabricated mass timber frame, not unlike flat-pack furniture, which will have a highest seismic strength (under construction).

Their community and cultural projects include the He Tohu Document Room, built within the National Library of New Zealand, which houses three of New Zealand's constitutional documents: the Declaration of the Independence of New Zealand (He Whakaputanga o te Rangatiratanga o Nu Tireni, 1835), the Treaty of Waitangi (Te Tiriti o Waitangi, 1840) and the 1893 Women's Suffrage Petition (Te Petihana Whakamana Pōti Wahine). Other cultural projects include the Aviation Display Hall at MOTAT (2011) and Aratoi museum in Masterton (2001).

The studio has also been involved in the seismic strengthening and adaptive reuse of heritage buildings, including the New Zealand National War Memorial, at the centre of Pukeahu National War Memorial Park, Wellington.

Author Stephen Stratford wrote a book about the practice in 2008.

== Notable works and awards ==
The studio's projects have included:

- National War Memorial, Wellington (2014), NZIA New Zealand Architecture Awards, Winner (Heritage)
- Aratoi museum, Masterton (2001)
- St Joseph's Church, Mount Victoria, Wellington (2004)
- Meridian Building, Wellington waterfront (2007)
- Kumutoto public space, Wellington waterfront (2010) - International Federation of Landscape Architects Award
- The international terminal at Wellington Airport, known as The Rock (2010)
- Te Tohu Exhibition (2017) - Design Institute of New Zealand (DINZ) Best Awards, Purple Pin – Supreme Winner (Spatial Design), 2017
- 20 Customhouse Quay, Wellington (2018) - NZIA Wellington Architecture Awards, Winner (Commercial Architecture)
- Nelson Airport (2018) - NZIA New Zealand Architecture Awards, Winner (Commercial Architecture) in 2020
- Strengthening and modifications of the Massey University Refectory, Palmerston North (2021), originally designed by architect Roy Lippincott
- Tākina – Wellington Convention Centre and Exhibition Centre (2023) - awarded World-Architects, Runner-Up World Building of the Year, 2024

== Sources ==
- Stephen Stratford, Herriot + Melhuish Architecture, Architecture+, Studiopacific Architecture / Editor, Stephen Stratford. Auckland, N.Z.: New Zealand Architectural Publications Trust, 2008.
