= Sounds Air =

New Zealand airline

IATA	ICAO	Call sign
S8	SDA	SOUNDSAIR
- Founded: 1986
- Operating bases: Wellington Airport
- Fleet size: 4
- Destinations: 5
- Headquarters: Blenheim, New Zealand
- Key people: Cliff Marchant (Founder), Andrew Crawford (Chief Executive/Director), Rhyan Wardman (Chairman, Director), Steve Handyside (Director), Simon Craddock (Director)
- Website: soundsair.com

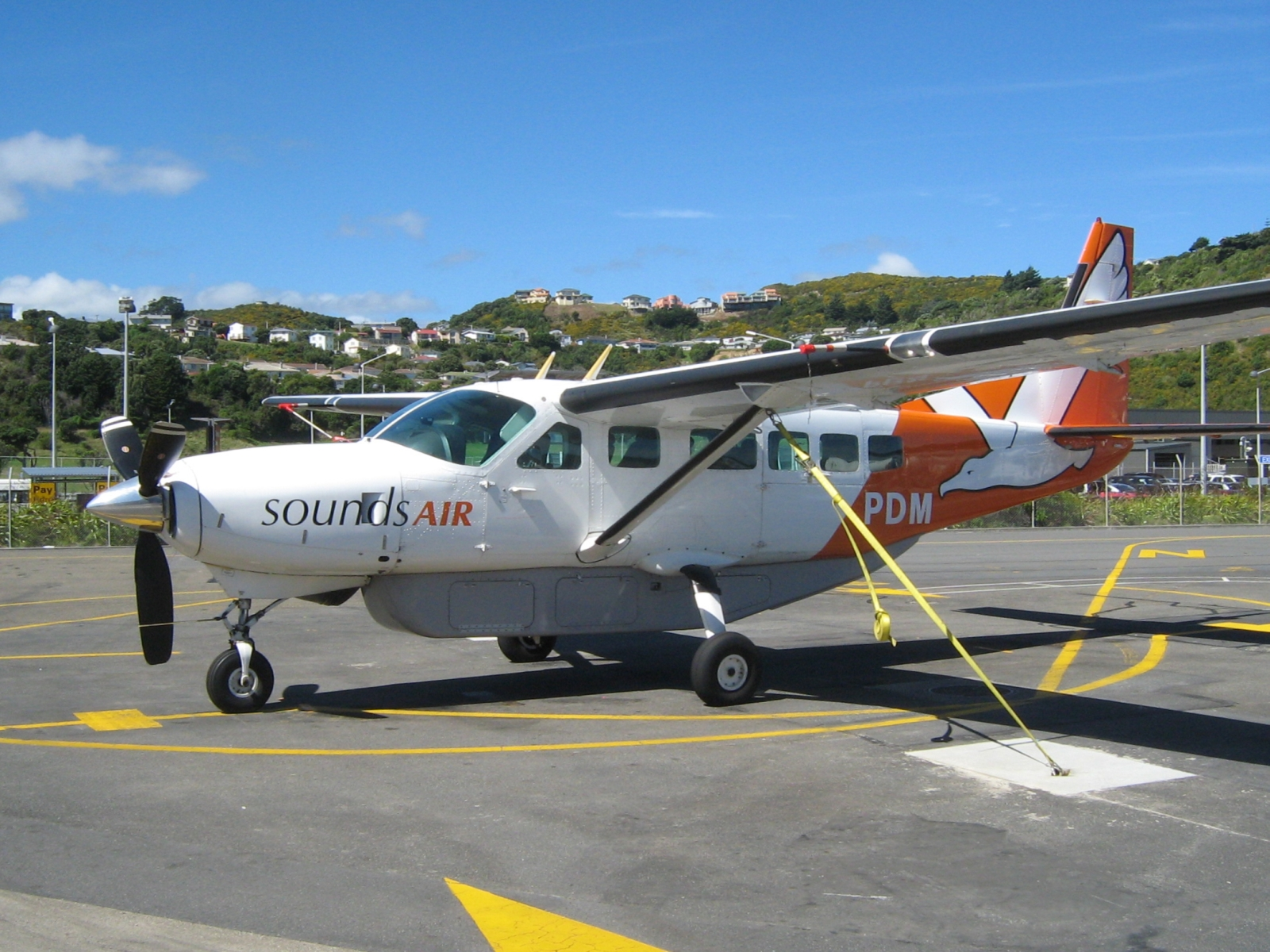
A Sounds Air Cessna Caravan at Wellington International Airport in 2009

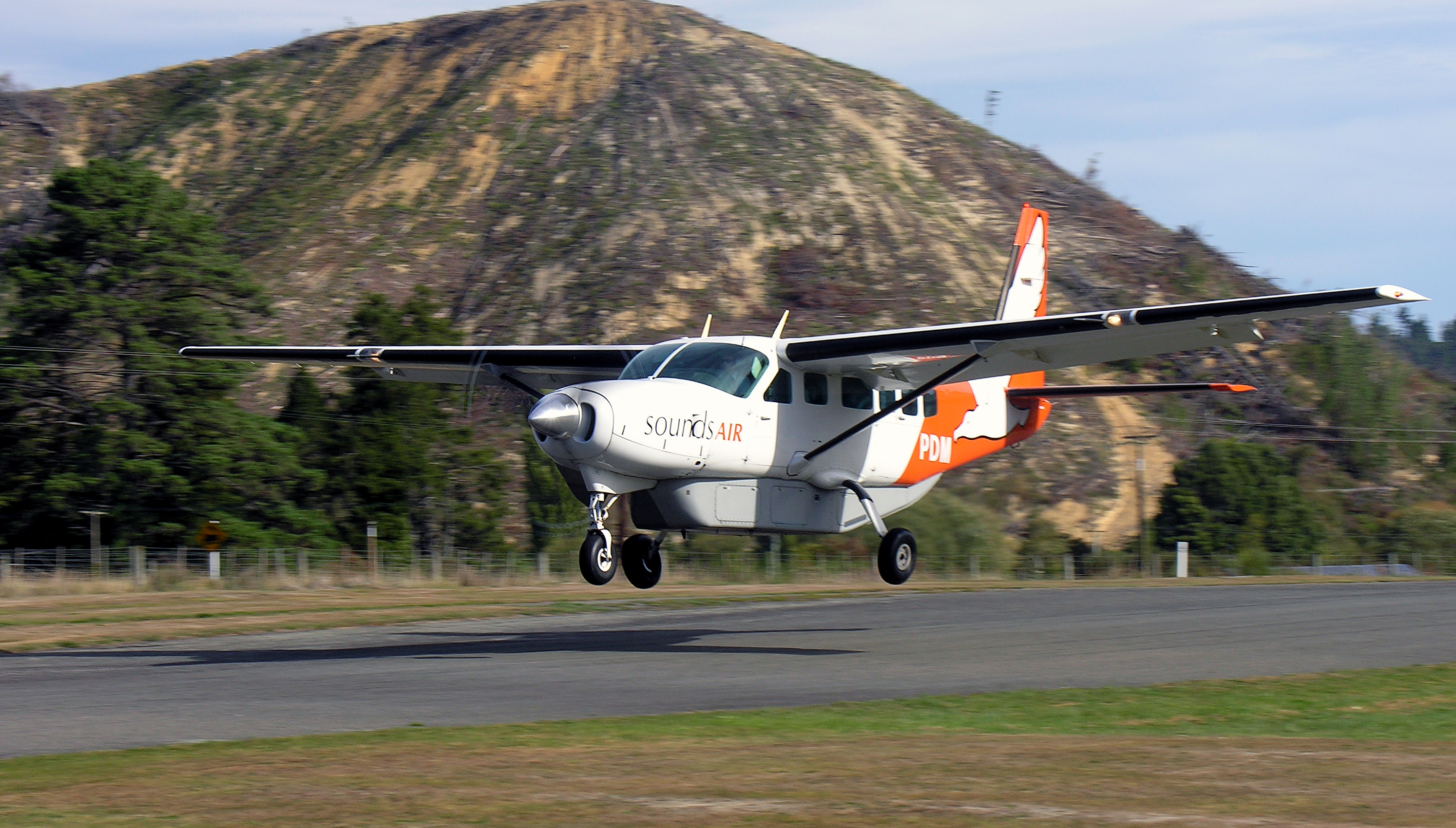
Sounds Air Grand Caravan landing at Picton in 2006.

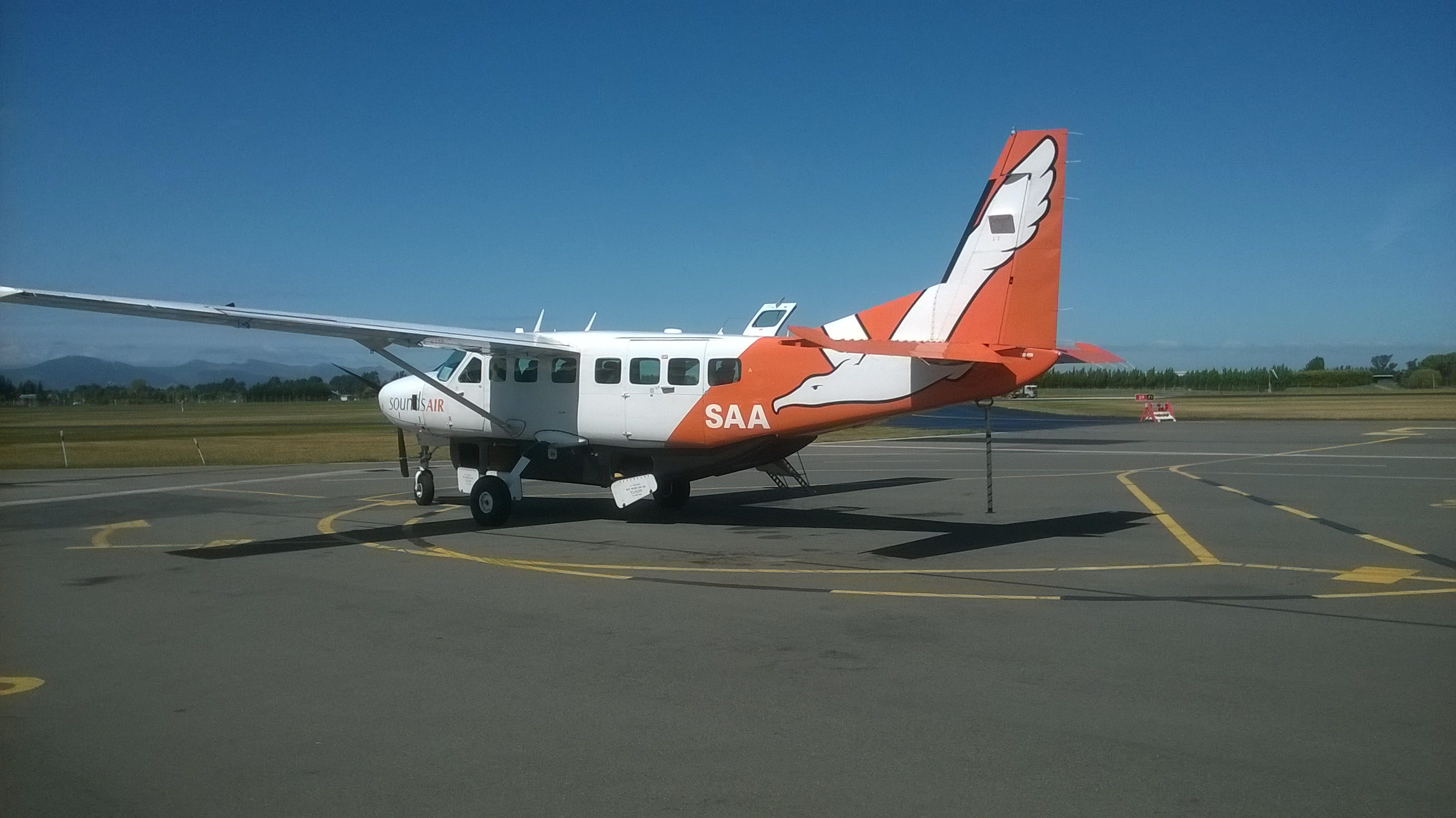
A Sounds Air Grand Caravan at Christchurch Airport in 2014.

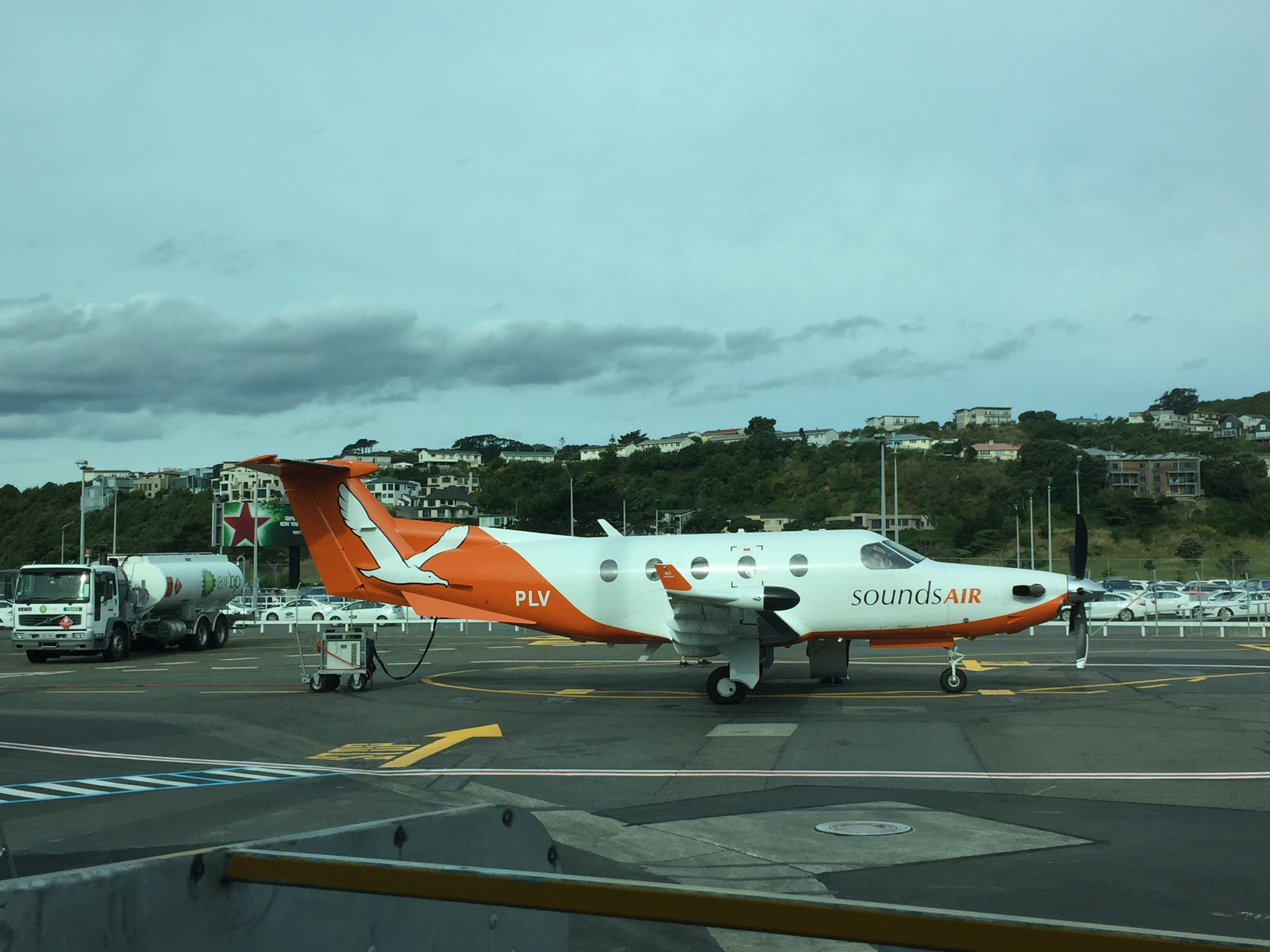
One of Sounds Air's former PC12's (ZK-PLV) at Wellington International in 2017.

Sounds Air is a New Zealand airline based in Marlborough. The airline was founded in 1986 by Cliff and Diane Marchant to provide low cost flights to the Marlborough Sounds. The airline's head office as well as its Sounds Aero Maintenance division is based at Omaka aerodrome.

== History ==
From a single Cessna Caravan operating one route across the Cook Strait, Sounds Air has grown in 30 years; the airline carried 78,000 passengers in 2015, compared to 14,000 passengers in 2003. In 2008 the airline set up its own maintenance division as the airline could not find a company suitable to maintain its fleet. In 2017, Sounds Air signaled that they were looking at buying twin engine planes for the first time: up to three 19-seater Beech 1900 aircraft to support extra demand for the Blenheim to Christchurch route.

== Services ==
Sounds Air operates scheduled flights between Wellington and Picton, Nelson, and Blenheim. Scheduled flights are also available between Blenheim and Paraparaumu,. Nelson also has flights to Paraparaumu. Sounds Air formerly served Kaikoura, Napier, Taupo, Westport, Christchurch, Wanaka and Whanganui from Wellington, Napier from Blenheim and Kāpiti Coast from Picton. A service to Masterton was being considered from Wellington, however no such service eventuated, because the town wanted the link to Auckland reinstated instead. In addition to scheduled flights Sounds Air offers scenic flights over the Marlborough Sounds and Abel Tasman National Park. The airline started temporary services to Kaikoura from Christchurch and Blenheim on 21 November 2016 following the 2016 Kaikōura earthquake. The Kaikoura to Christchurch flights ceased from 27 January 2017 followed by the Blenheim flights on 29 December 2017. From this date onwards Kaikoura will become a charter route only. Sounds Air commenced Christchurch to Wānaka another former Air New Zealand route on 2 November 2020.

On 18 October 2024 Sounds Air decided to pull out of Westport because of high costs and lack of support from the government. A month later Sounds Air announced they were pulling out of Taupo also because of high costs. Originair has since stepped in to serve both Taupo and Westport from Wellington.

In July 2025 Sounds Air announced that it will end services to Christchurch from Wanaka and Blenheim and it's PC-12 fleet will be sold. In September 2 months later Sounds Air pulled out of Christchurch and Wanaka.

== Destinations ==
Sounds Air operates scheduled services to the following destinations within New Zealand:

City	IATA	Airport	Status
Blenheim	BHE	Woodbourne Airport	Current
Christchurch	CHC	Christchurch International Airport	Terminated
Kaikōura	KBZ	Kaikoura Airport	Terminated
Napier	NPE	Hawke's Bay Airport	Terminated
Nelson	NSN	Nelson Airport	Current
Paraparaumu	PPQ	Kapiti Coast Airport	Current
Picton	PCN	Picton Aerodrome	Current
Taupō	TUO	Taupō Airport	Terminated
Wānaka	WKA	Wānaka Airport	Terminated
Wellington	WLG	Wellington International Airport	Current
Westport	WSZ	Westport Airport	Terminated
Whanganui	WAG	Whanganui Airport	Terminated

== Fleet ==
As of September 2025 the Sounds Air fleet consists of four aircraft. Four Cessna 208 Caravans which are strutted, high wing aircraft with an unpressurized cabin. They are powered by a single Pratt & Whitney Canada PT6A tractor turboprop and have a fixed tricycle landing gear. Two of the four are 208s which seat 12 people in a 1–2 configuration with a 2-person bench seat in the aft section. The two others are the stretched 208Bs which seat 13 people in a 1–2 configuration.

Aircraft	Total	Orders	Passengers (Economy)
Cessna 208 Caravan	4		12

== Former fleet ==
Over the years Sounds Air operated the following airplanes.

- Cessna 206
- Gippsland GA8 Airvan
- BN Islander
- Cessna 172
- Cessna 525
- Pilatus PC-12

== Future ==
On 28 September 2020, the airline signed a letter of intent to Swedish company Heart Aerospace to purchase their ES-19 electric aircraft once it comes available, scheduled for 2026. The airline hopes the ES-19 will be able to make them the first regional airline to offer Zero-emissions flights. In 2022 this was upgraded to the ES-30.

== Accidents and incidents ==
- On 19 March 1989 Britten Norman BN2A Islander, ZK-SFE, while attempting to land at Tiraora Lodge struck a telephone wire and descended into the sea. The pilot and five passengers were rescued but suffered varying degrees of injury.
- On 29 January 1996 Cessna 208 Caravan, ZK-SFA, crashed into the eastern slopes of Mount Robertson on approach to Picton Aerodrome at Koromiko after a flight from Wellington. All five passengers were killed, but the pilot survived.
