= Jon Craig (architect) =

New Zealand architect

- Born: Jon Alastair Craig; 1941 or 1942
- Died: 16 August 2015 (aged 73); Lower Hutt, New Zealand
- Occupation: Architect
- Spouse: Judith Robyn Craig (m. 1967; died 2010)
- Practice: Craig Craig Moller

Jon Alastair Craig (1941 or 1942 – 16 August 2015) was a New Zealand architect.

Born in about 1942, Craig was the son of Rawinia Zena (née Wortley) and James Thomas Craig, an architect. In 1969 Craig entered into partnership with his father and Gordon Moller, to form the firm Craig Craig Moller. It became one of New Zealand's leading architectural practices, establishing its reputation initially with residential houses, and later designing larger-scale commercial and public buildings. Craig's own home, which he built in Pinehaven in 1967 and gradually expanded and renovated over many years, was dubbed the "house in the trees" and won an NZIA national award in 1990.

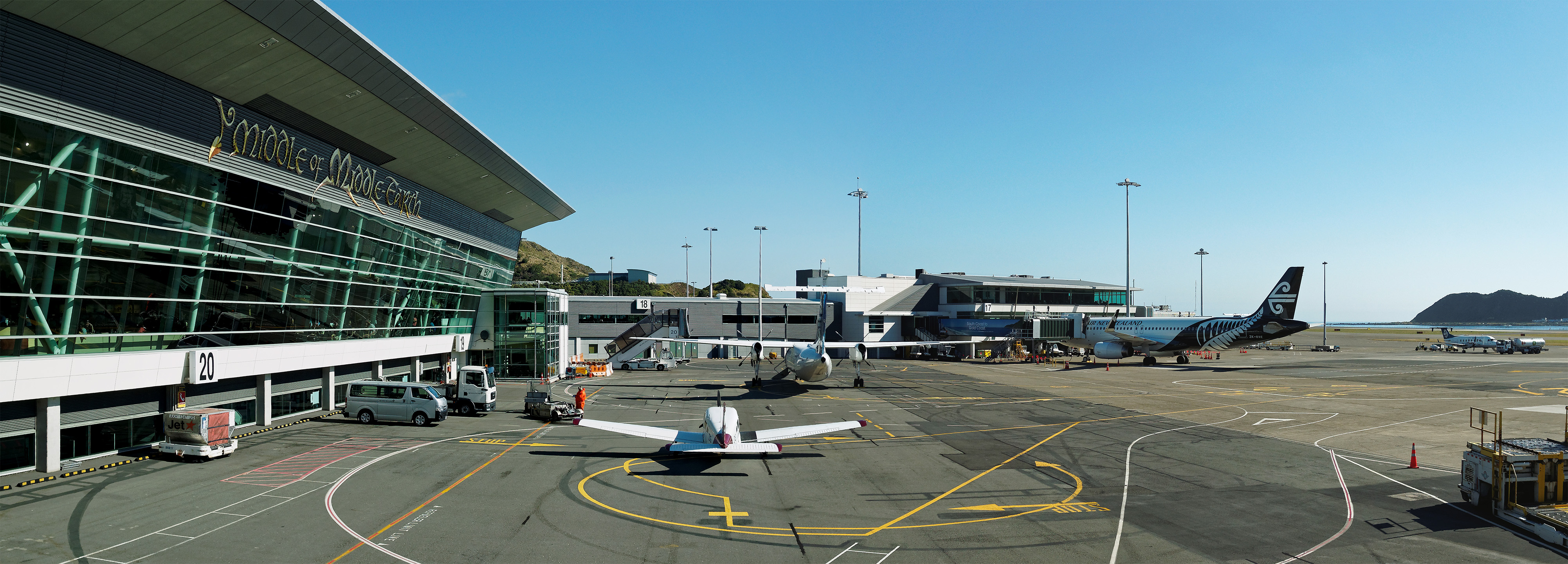
Wellington airport main terminal

Between 1994 and 1999, Craig was the lead architect for the new terminal development at Wellington International Airport.

Craig retired from architectural practice in 2008, but continued his interest in the built environment as a trustee of the Wellington Sculpture Trust.

Craig died in Lower Hutt on 16 August 2015 at the age of 73.
