= Picton Aerodrome =

Airport in New Zealand

- IATA: PCN; ICAO: NZPN

Summary
- Airport type: Private
- Operator: Sounds Air and Travel Ltd
- Serves: Picton (town)
- Location: Koromiko, New Zealand
- Elevation AMSL: 459 ft (140 m)
- Coordinates: 41°20′41″S 173°57′29″E
- Interactive map of Picton Aerodrome

Runways
Direction	Length		Surface
Direction	m	ft	Surface
18/36	840	2,755	Bitumen

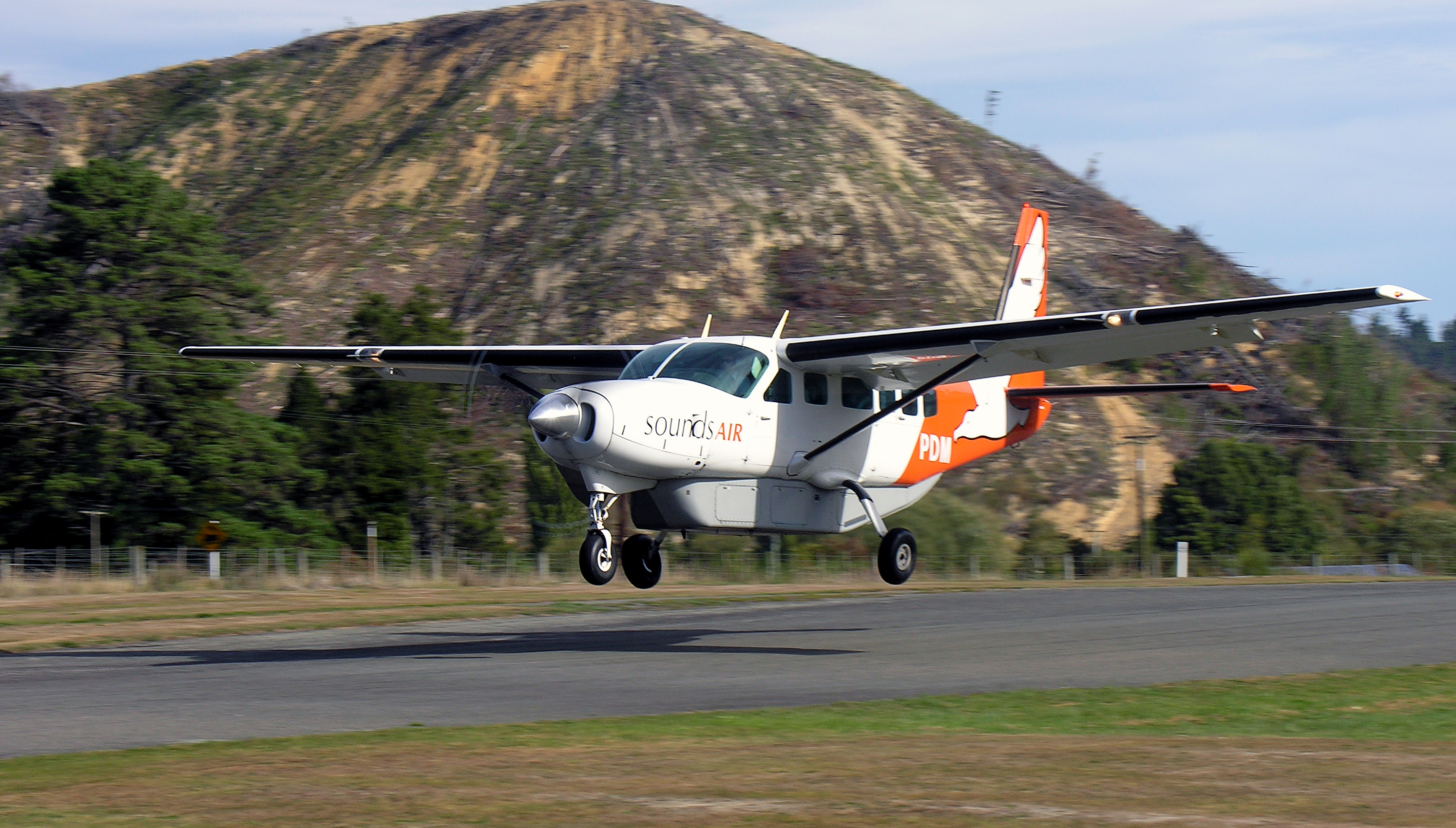
A Sounds Air aircraft arriving at Picton

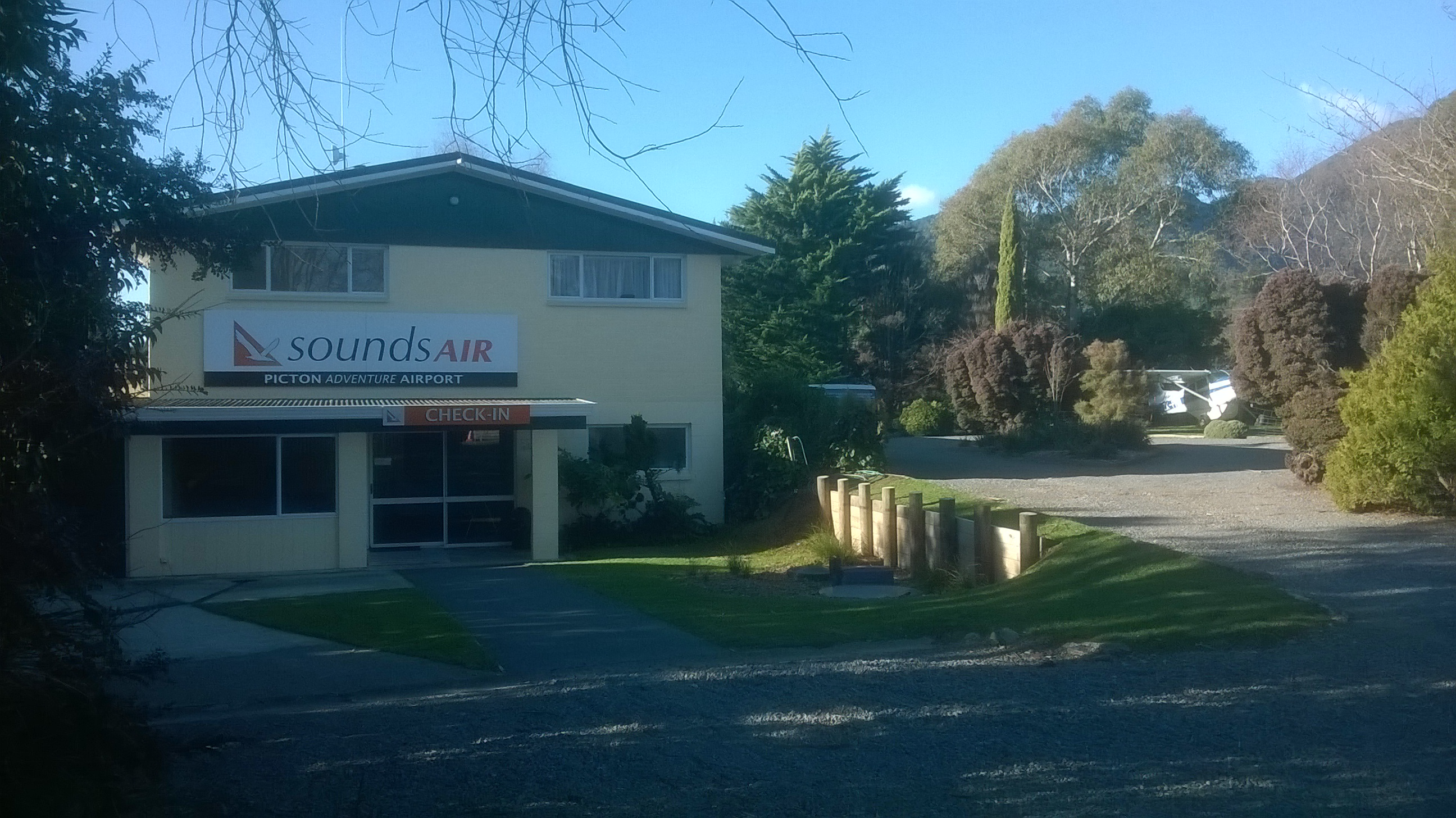
The Picton Adventure Airport terminal building in 2016

Picton Aerodrome (IATA: PCN, ICAO: NZPN) is a Non-Certificated Aerodrome located at Koromiko 4 NM (7.4 km; 4.6 mi) south of Picton township in the Marlborough District of the South Island in New Zealand. Sounds Air has 5 flights per day to Wellington. The Marlborough Sounds Airpark is located nearby offering 16 private hangars adjacent to the main runway with remote control access for the owners to park their aircraft.

== History ==
On 2 January 1986, seven people died when a Cessna aircraft crashed on takeoff near Picton. This was an engine failure in the climb after takeoff and unrelated to the Airport itself. In another accident on 29 January 1996, five died when a Cessna Caravan crashed on approach to Picton. A Coroner's inquest found that the en-route accident could have been prevented had the Caravan been able to fly IFR, as happens now.

== Airlines and destinations ==
Sounds Air connects Picton Aerodrome to Wellington International Airport.

== See also ==
- List of airports in New Zealand
- List of airlines of New Zealand
- Transport in New Zealand

== Sources ==
- NZAIP Volume 4 AD
- AIP New Zealand (PDF)
