= Whanganui Airport =

- IATA: WAG; ICAO: NZWU

Summary
- Location: Whanganui, New Zealand
- Elevation AMSL: 27 ft / 8 m
- Coordinates: 39°57′44″S 175°01′31″E
- Website: https://www.whanganuiairport.co.nz/

Map
- Location of airport in North Island

Runways
Direction	Length		Surface
Direction	ft	m	Surface
11L/29R	4,501	1,372	Asphalt
11R/29L	2,588	789	Grass
08/26	2,198	670	Grass
14/32	2,992	912	Grass
- Source: AIP NZ NZWU

Whanganui Airport (IATA: WAG, ICAO: NZWU), named Wanganui Airport until 2016, is the airport that serves Whanganui, New Zealand. It is located to the south of Whanganui River, approximately 4 km from the centre of Whanganui. The airport has a single asphalt runway and three grass runways, and its single terminal has two gates.

== History ==
The airport opened in 1954, and services to the airport began in November that year.

In September 2013, Air New Zealand announced that it would withdraw services from Whanganui to Wellington and Taupo in December 2013. Sounds Air took over the Wellington route until 15 May 2015. Air New Zealand then withdrew service from Auckland to Whanganui on 31 July 2016. The next day, Air Chathams began service between Whanganui and Auckland, replicating Air New Zealand's schedule and, according to then-mayor Annette Main, saving the airport from potential closure.

Work to resurface the asphalt runway began in October 2023. The new surface is expected to last for 15 years.

== Operations ==
Air Chathams now operates daily flights between Whanganui and Auckland. There are three flights in each direction on weekdays and one on weekend days, using ATR 72-500 aircraft.

Air Whanganui, which offers business charter and medivac flights, is based at Whanganui Airport and provides services throughout the country. In 2023, Air Whanganui began offering scholarships to Whanganui high-school students who are interested in a career in aviation.

== Airlines and destinations ==
Airlines	Destinations
Air Chathams	Auckland

== See also ==
- List of airports in New Zealand
- List of airlines of New Zealand
- Transport in New Zealand
