= Golden Bay Air =

Airline of New Zealand

IATA	ICAO	Call sign
G1 (Note: Not an IATA allocation – issued for domestic use by the Civil Aviation Authority of New Zealand)	GBY (Note: Not an ICAO allocation – issued for domestic use by the Civil Aviation Authority of New Zealand)	GOLDEN BAY
- Founded: 27 September 2006 as Capital Air; 26 May 2009 as Golden Bay Air
- Operating bases: Tākaka Aerodrome, Tākaka
- Focus cities: Wellington
- Fleet size: 3
- Destinations: 4
- Headquarters: Tākaka
- Key people: Majority shareholders: Lisa Sheppard; Richard Molloy
- Website: www.goldenbayair.co.nz

Golden Bay Air Limited is a small airline based at Tākaka Aerodrome in Tākaka, New Zealand. The airline currently operates three light aircraft from Tākaka to Wellington and Karamea, and also from Nelson to Tākaka and Karamea with connecting road shuttle services to the Abel Tasman National Park, the Heaphy Track in the Kahurangi National Park and to and from Tākaka township. Other services provided by the airline include charter flights around New Zealand flown on demand and preset scenic routes around the national parks as well as Farewell Spit.

== History ==
Golden Bay Air originated in November 2005 as Zephair Limited, and flights began in 2006 under the name Capital Air. The name of the company was legally changed to Capital Air Bookings Ltd in September of that year, and the airline changed its name to the one currently used in May 2009.

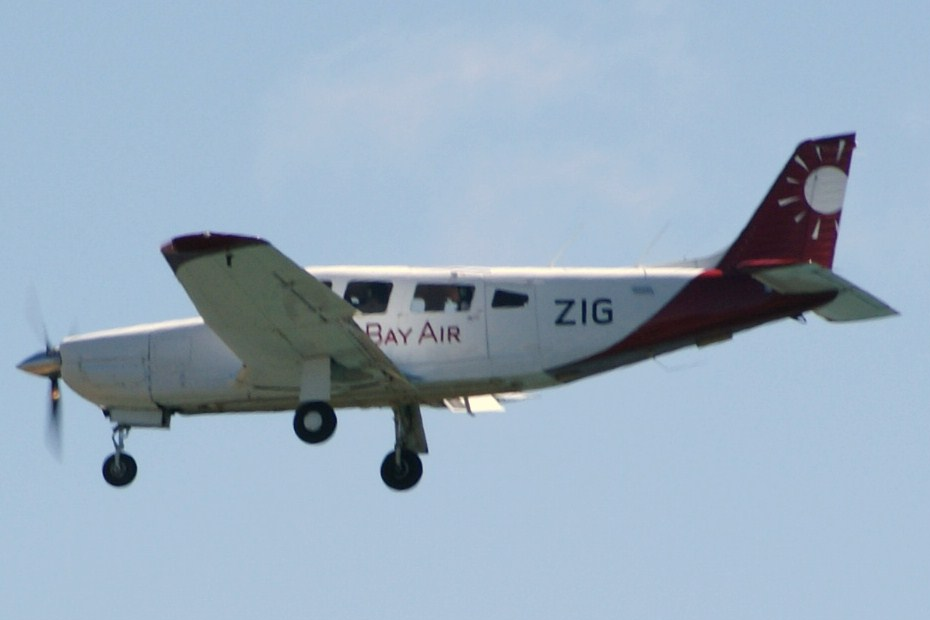
Golden Bay Air Piper Saratoga

The airline was originally based in Wellington, but moved its base of operations to Tākaka at the time of the name change in 2009.

In 2010, Golden Bay Air commissioned a global navigation satellite system (GNSS) instrument approach system at Tākaka Aerodrome.

In April 2018, Golden Bay Air ceased passenger operations temporarily as their air operator certificate issued by the Civil Aviation Authority of New Zealand had lapsed. The airline chartered flights from other airlines in order to honour bookings. The airline announced on 19 May 2018 that the re-certification procedure had been completed.

== Fleet ==
In late 2022, the airline added a Britten-Norman BN-2 Islander to its fleet. The following aircraft are operated by the airline:

Aircraft	Total	Orders	Passengers (Economy)
Gippsland GA8 Airvan	1		7
Piper Archer	1		3
Britten-Norman BN-2 Islander	1		9
Total	3		

== Destinations ==
Golden Bay Air operates scheduled services to four airports:

- Karamea (from Nelson and Tākaka)
- Nelson (from Tākaka and Karamea)
- Tākaka (hub)
- Wellington (from Tākaka)

In addition to the scheduled flights, on demand charter flights operate between many destinations, most popular include Kapiti Coast and Motueka
