= Karamea Aerodrome =

Airport in Karamea, New Zealand

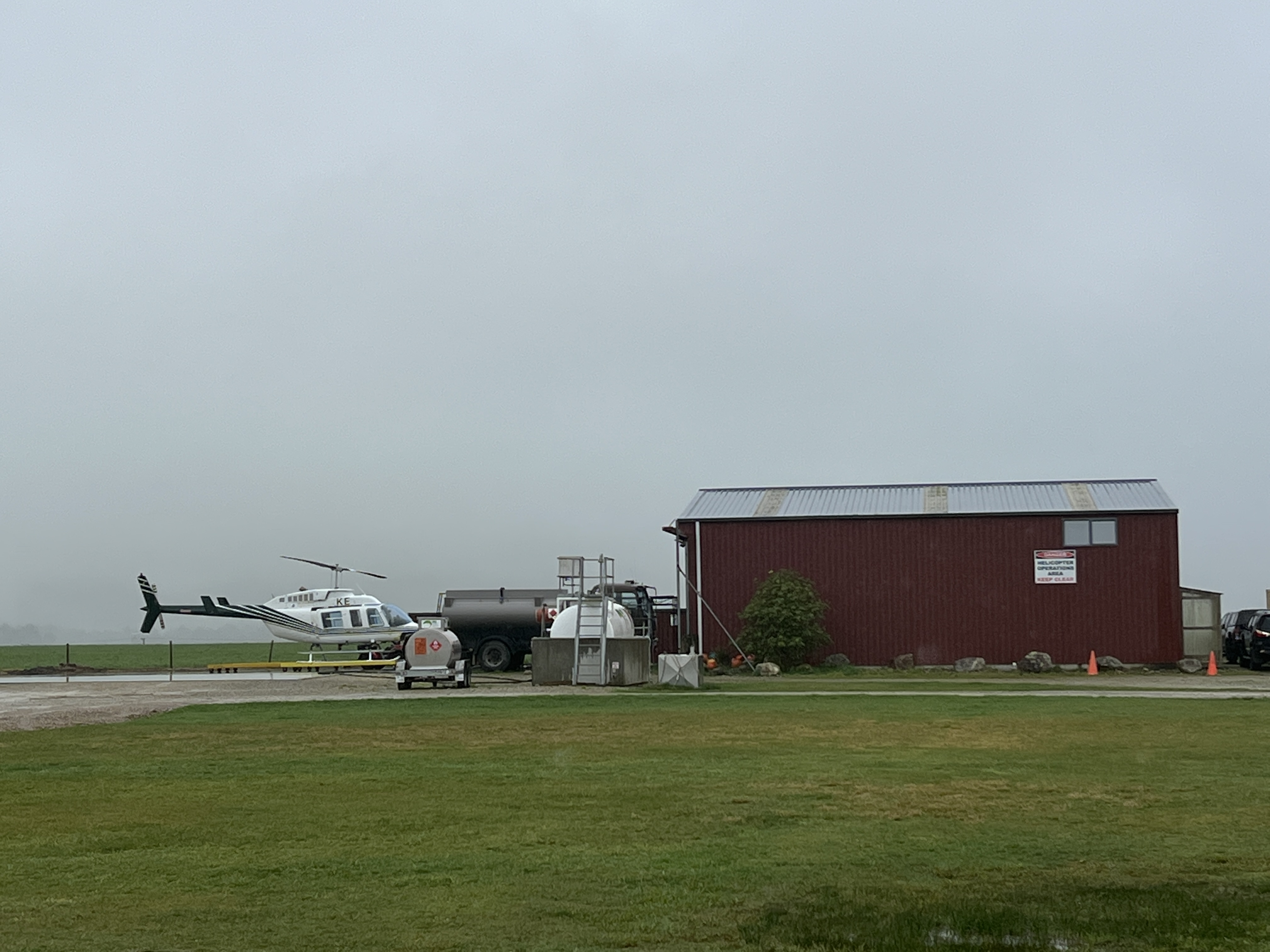
- IATA: none; ICAO: NZKM

Summary
- Operator: Karamea Aerodrome Inc
- Location: Karamea, New Zealand
- Hub for: Golden Bay Air
- Built: 1940
- Elevation AMSL: 28 ft (8.5 m)
- Coordinates: 41°14′17″S 172°06′22″E

Map
- Interactive map of Karamea Aerodrome

Runways
Direction	Length		Surface
Direction	m	ft	Surface
01/19	945	3,100	Bitumen/Grass
17/35	655	2,149	Grass

The Karamea Aerodrome serves the town of Karamea, in the South Island of New Zealand. It is a non certificated aerodrome located around 1.4 kilometres (0.87 mi) northwest of the town.

== History ==
=== Air services after 1929 earthquake ===
The Murchison earthquake of 17 June 1929 caused severe damage in the Karamea area, with all roads in the district closed and nearly all bridges damaged. The road from Westport to Karamea was severely damaged by large landslides which cut the community's road link for about two years. The earthquake disrupted efforts underway at the time to control an outbreak of diphtheria in the settlement and on 19 June, serum was delivered by air, with the aircraft landing on the beach. On 1 July 1929, a flight from Westport to Karamea brought a shortwave radio transmitter and radio operator to the town to help restore communications. Aircraft were also used to deliver mail to the town, following the earthquake.

=== Establishment of aerodrome ===
An aerodrome at Karamea was initially investigated in 1935 as part of a major government programme of airfield development in the South Island, made possible by the engagement of unemployed men. On 12 November 1940, a notice was published proposing the taking of land under the Public Works Act 1929 for the construction of an aerodrome.

In 1943, the Karamea aerodrome was included in a West Coast air service on an "as-required" basis, but subject to the ground conditions at the aerodrome being suitable. At that time, the field could not be used in all weathers, and required further drainage. In October 1965, the aerodrome received a government grant for the costs of extending the runway from 2,500 feet (760 m) to 3,100 feet (940 m), to help improve air services and reduce the isolation of the Karamea region.

In 2016, the aerodrome applied to the Buller District Council for funding an upgrade of the runway. The Chair of the Karamea Aerodrome noted that the airport was run by volunteers, and that an air service was vital for the community because it was regularly cut-off by slips on the only access road into Karamea.

== Operations ==
In 1978, there was a disturbance at the airport when around 100 residents prevented the departure of a light plane carrying the Medical Officer of Health at Nelson, in protest against the lack of commitments to improving health facilities in the town.

The aerodrome is currently managed and operated by Karamea Aerodrome Inc, established in October 1989.

In 2016, the aerodrome reported 1,957 aircraft movements over a period of 14 months. Many of these aircraft movements were for transporting trampers to or from the Heaphy Track. The Chair reported that only around one-third of pilots were paying the landing fees.

=== Airlines and destinations ===
Golden Bay Air connects Karamea Aerodrome to Nelson Airport and Tākaka Aerodrome.

A helicopter charter business also operates from the aerodrome.

== See also ==
- List of airports in New Zealand
- List of airlines of New Zealand
- Transport in New Zealand
