= Tākaka Aerodrome =

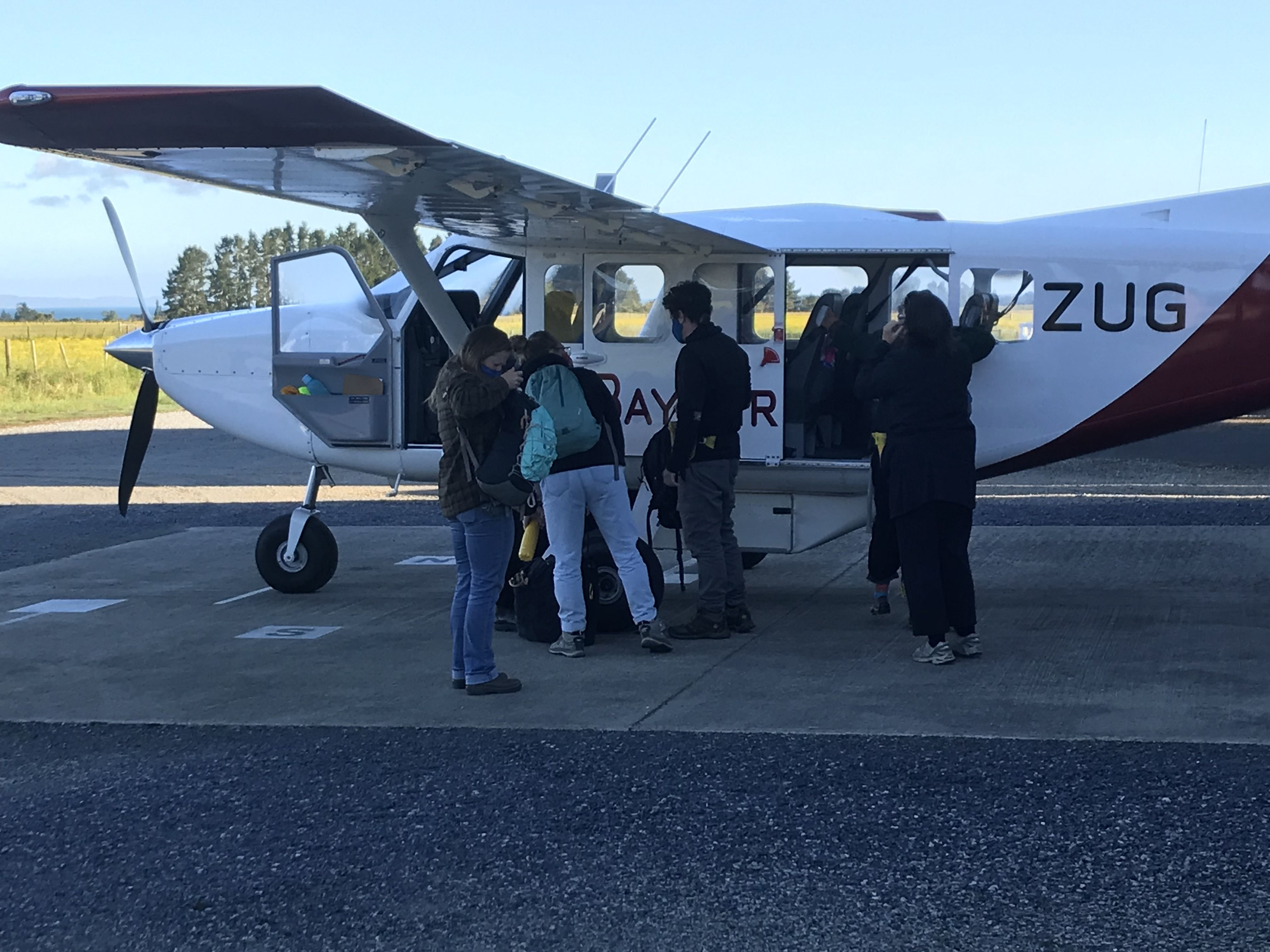
- Passengers boarding the flight to Wellington
- IATA: KTF; ICAO: NZTK

Summary
- Operator: Tākaka Aerodrome Management Committee
- Location: Tākaka, New Zealand
- Hub for: Golden Bay Air
- Built: 1940
- Elevation AMSL: 100 ft / 30 m
- Coordinates: 40°49′0.84″S 172°46′33.60″E
- Interactive map of Tākaka Aerodrome

Runways
| Direction | Length | | Surface |
| Direction | m | ft | Surface |
|---|---|---|---|
| 11/29 | 770 | 2,526 | Gravel |
| 18/36 | 832 | 2,730 | Asphalt |

The Tākaka Aerodrome serves the town of Tākaka, in the South Island of New Zealand.

== Description ==
Tākaka Aerodrome is northwest of the town. State Highway 60 runs just south of Runway 36. It was established in 1940 and is owned by the Tasman District Council.

There are two runways at the aerodrome. Runway 18/36 runs north–south and is 832 metres (2,730 feet) long and 12 metres (39 feet) wide. Runway 11/29 second crosses the runway 18/36 in a south-east to north-west direction and is 770 metres (2,530 feet) long.

== Airlines and destinations ==
| Airlines | Destinations |
|---|---|
| Golden Bay Air | Karamea, Nelson, Wellington |

== See also ==
- List of airports in New Zealand
- List of airlines of New Zealand
- Transport in New Zealand

== Sources ==
- AIP New Zealand Aerodrome Chart (PDF)
- Golden Bay Air
