= Nelson Airport (New Zealand) =

Nelson Airport Te Papa Waka Rererangi o Whakatū
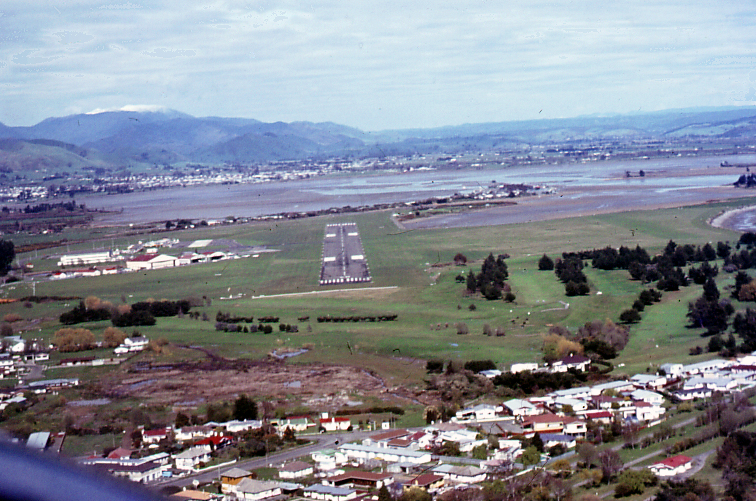
- Nelson Airport, 1977
- IATA: NSN; ICAO: NZNS

Summary
- Airport type: Public
- Operator: Nelson Airport Limited
- Location: Nelson, New Zealand
- Elevation AMSL: 17 ft (5.2 m)
- Coordinates: 41°17′54″S 173°13′16″E
- Website: www.NelsonAirport.co.nz

Map
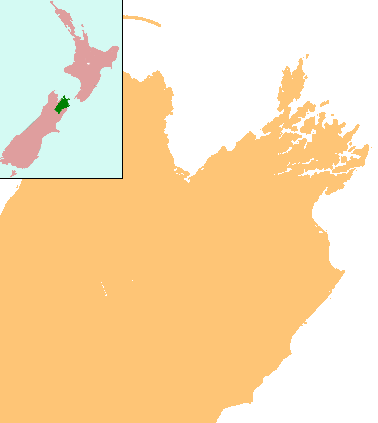
- Location of airport in the northern South Island

Runways
Direction	Length		Surface
Direction	m	ft	Surface
02/20	1,347	4,420	Asphalt
02/20	584	1,916	Grass
06/24	546	1,791	Grass

Statistics (2017)
- Passengers: 1,000,373
- Sources: Airport, AIP, DAFIF,

Nelson Airport (Māori: Te Papa Waka Rererangi o Whakatū) (IATA: NSN, ICAO: NZNS) is located 6 km (3.7 mi) south-west of central Nelson, New Zealand, in the suburb of Annesbrook. Approximately 1.2 million passengers and visitors use the airport terminal annually. Passenger numbers for the 2017 financial year were 1,000,373, up from 865,203 in 2016.

It is the sixth-busiest airport in New Zealand by passenger numbers and seventh by aircraft movements, as well as being the busiest New Zealand airport without any scheduled international service. The airport has an Air New Zealand Koru Lounge.

== History ==
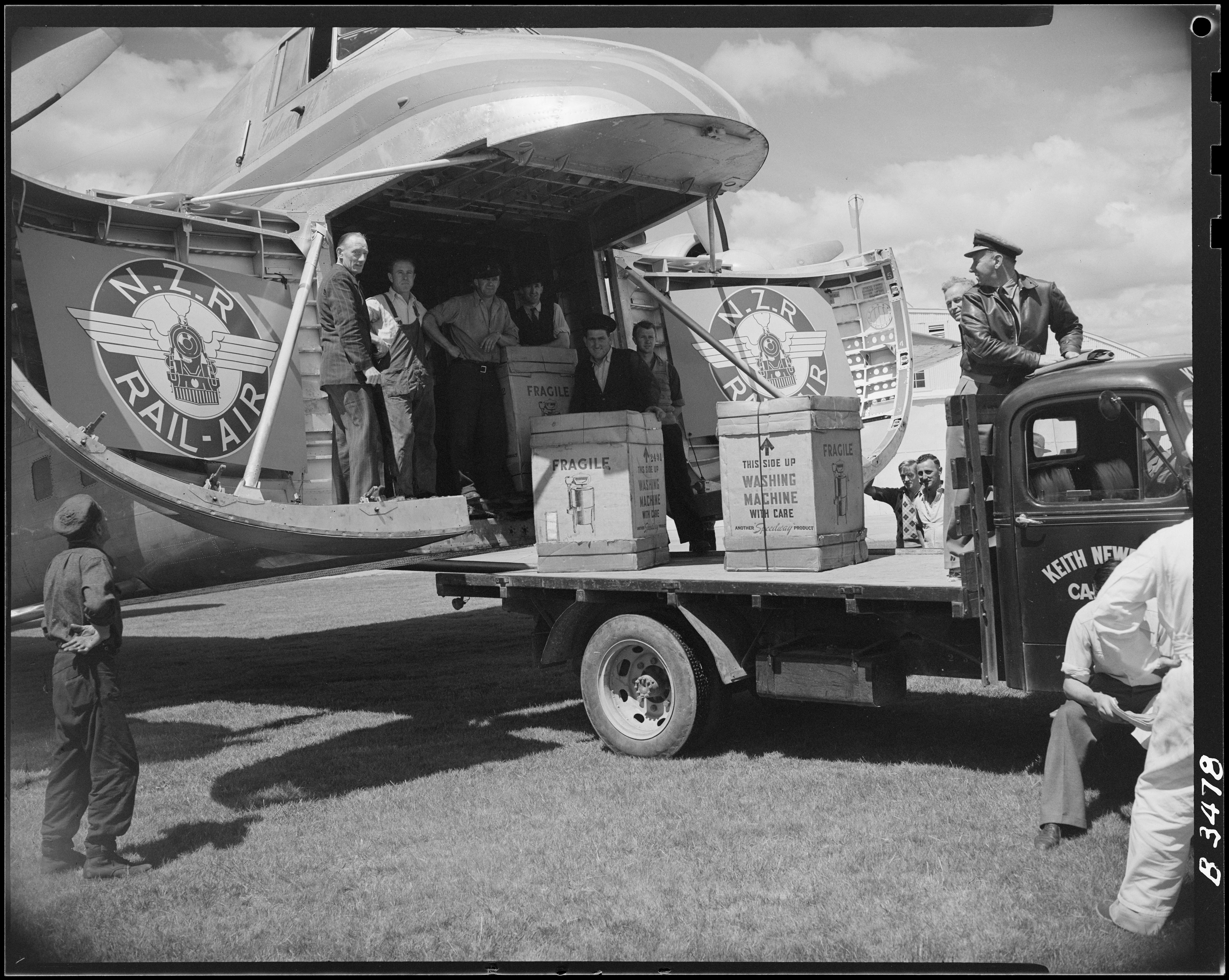
Bristol 170 Freighter unloading at Nelson, 5 November 1952

Construction of Nelson Airport commenced in 1937. In 2006, the airport received restricted international airport status and it has handled international private jets since then. The airport averages 60 commercial flights per day. The Airport precinct is home to 35 aeronautical and support businesses.

Nelson airport is the home base of Air Nelson operating under the Air NZ Link banner, which operates a fleet of 23 Bombardier Dash 8 Q300s on national air routes. Air New Zealand, Air Nelson's parent airline, recently expanded its Nelson base, investing 30 million dollars to develop the engineering and technical workshops. Air New Zealand then announced the Air Nelson maintenance facility would also handle fellow subsidiary Mount Cook Airline's fleet of ATR 72-600 aircraft.

The airport has a single terminal building with 9 tarmac gates. A further 7 remote gates are located adjacent to the terminal.

In 2014, Nelson City Council deemed the main terminal of Nelson Airport an earthquake risk and at fault of possible liquefaction. The airport has been granted 10 years to upgrade the terminal to meet current building standards. The Nelson Airport management on 8 September 2015 have decided to rebuild the terminal instead of renovating the existing complex as this will best meet the growth needs in the future. It was also announced that due to increased airline activity strong passenger growth could be expected over the next two years. It is estimated that by the end of 2017 there could be more than 1 million passengers per annum and over 300 flights per week at the airport.

Jetstar Airways commenced daily services between Nelson and Auckland on 1 December 2015, as well as Nelson to Wellington on 1 February 2016. These services ended at the end of November 2019.

On 6 December 2017, the airport inaugurated 270 new parking spaces and new exit barrier arms (the latter located near Air New Zealand's hangar on Trent Drive) in order to help with traffic flow during the development and expansion phase mentioned above.

Nelson Airport propose to extend the main runway to the north by 150m stating that it's one of the shortest runways in the world for the type of aircraft serving the airport and the current runway restricts payload on flights.

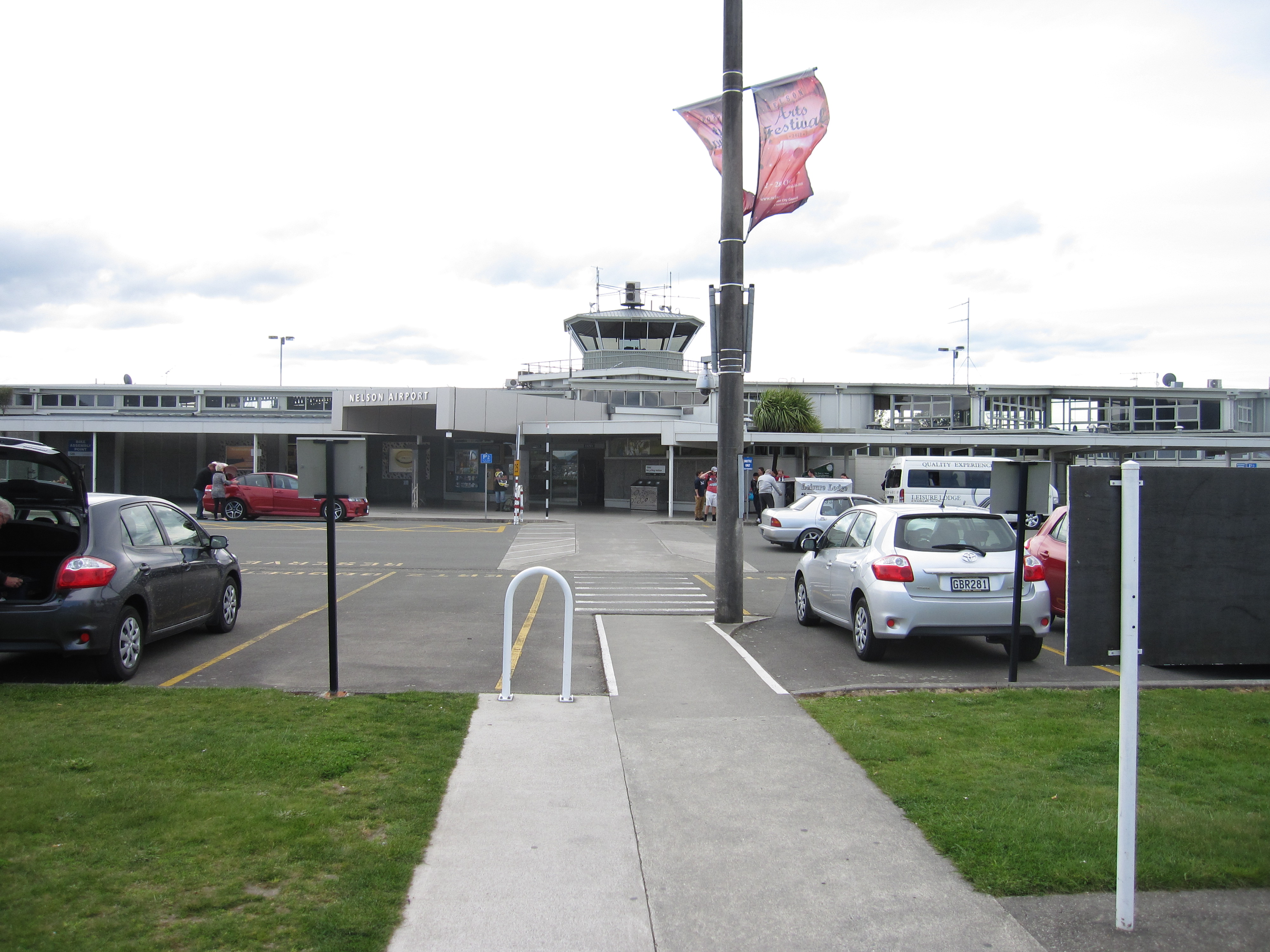
The former Nelson Airport terminal in 2012

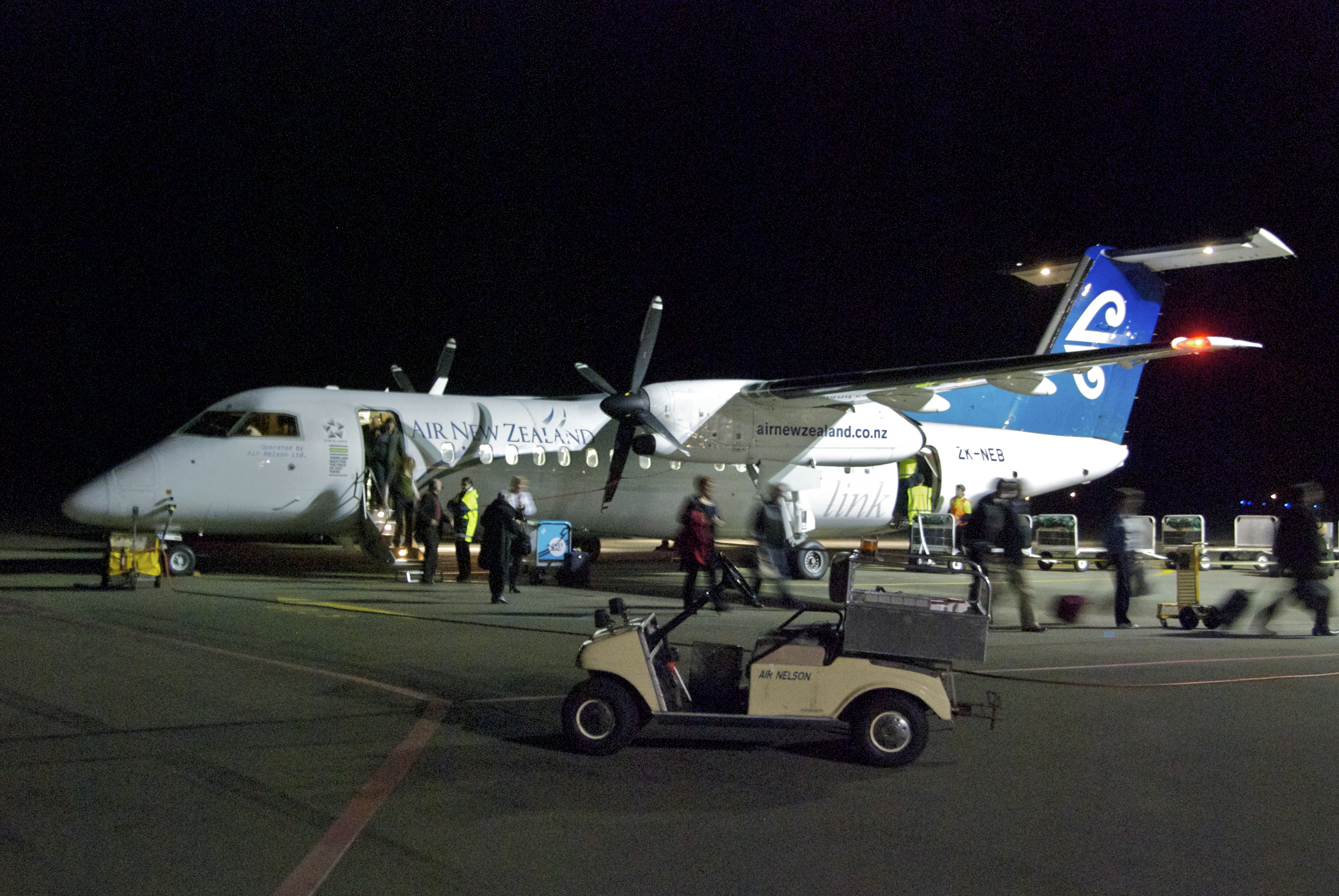
An Air New Zealand Link Dash 8 at Nelson in 2012.

== Airlines and destinations ==
Airlines	Destinations
Air New Zealand	Auckland, Christchurch, Wellington
Golden Bay Air	Karamea, Takaka
Originair	Blenheim, Christchurch, Palmerston North, Wellington
Sounds Air	Kapiti Coast, Wellington

== See also ==
- List of airports in New Zealand
- List of airlines of New Zealand
- Transport in New Zealand
- List of busiest airports in New Zealand
