= Westport Airport (New Zealand) =

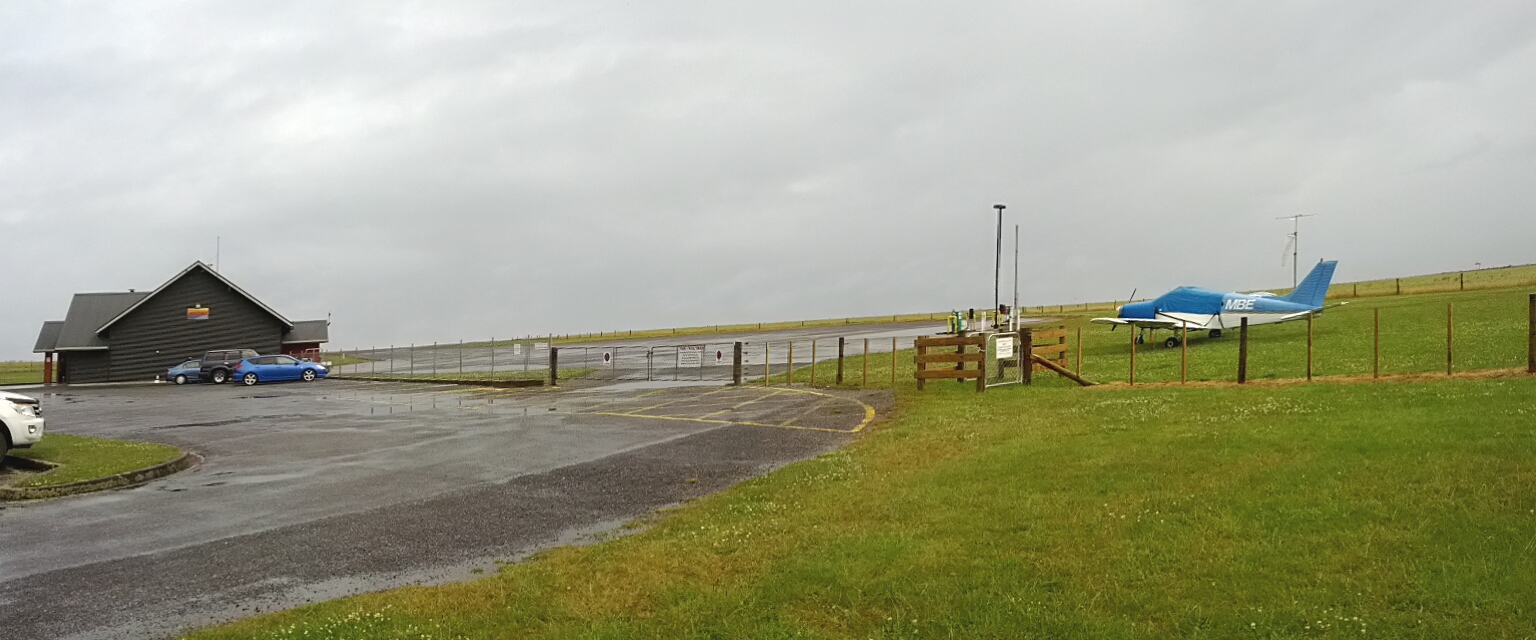
- The terminal and runway in 2013
- IATA: WSZ; ICAO: NZWS

Summary
- Location: Westport, New Zealand
- Elevation AMSL: 13 ft (4.0 m)
- Coordinates: 41°44′17″S 171°34′51″E
- Website: http://bullerdc.govt.nz/airport/

Map
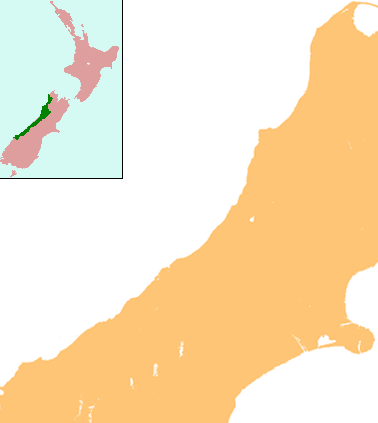
- Location of airport in West Coast

Runways
Direction	Length		Surface
Direction	ft	m	Surface
04/22	4,200	1,280	Asphalt
- Source: World Aero Data

Westport Airport (IATA: WSZ, ICAO: NZWS) is an airport in Kawatiri, Westport, New Zealand.

Originair has the only scheduled services into Westport, flying to Wellington using eighteen-seat BAE Jetstream 31. Air New Zealand previously had daily flights, operated by Eagle Airways Beechcraft 1900D aircraft, until April 2015, when Sounds Air commenced scheduled flights to and from Westport. In 2002 Air West Coast connected Westport to Greymouth, Christchurch and Wellington; these services were discontinued due to high costs and lack of passengers on 27 June 2008. Air Chathams also operates Saab 340 aircraft flights on an Ad-Hoc basis. Sounds Air operated from Westport to Wellington for 10 years with a 9 seater Pilautus PC-12 until it ceased due to lack of government support and high prices.

== History ==
The airport had services as far back as 1947 with Air Travel connecting Westport to Nelson and south to Hokitika. Later, NAC operated these flights onto Wellington with Dragon Rapide aircraft. In March 1952 the much larger Douglas DC-3s were used on the Westport–Nelson–Wellington route. The year ended 31 March 1966 saw Westport handle 7,557 passengers, an increase from 6,615 the year before. The runway was sealed in October 1970 to allow Friendship flights from Christchurch via Hokitika and onto Nelson and Wellington 6 days per week. Both the northbound and the southbound services flew into Westport in the afternoon. The airport terminal was refurbished in 2007.

== See also ==
- List of airports in New Zealand
- List of airlines of New Zealand
- Transport in New Zealand
