= Kiwi Airlines =

Kiwi Airlines was the name of two airlines operating in the late 1990s

- Kiwi International Air Lines operating in the United States
- Kiwi Travel International Airlines operating as Kiwi Airlines between New Zealand and Australia (1994-1996)

== See also ==
- Kiwi Regional Airlines operating in New Zealand in 2015–16.
