= Kiwi Regional Airlines =

IATA	ICAO	Call sign
—	KRL	REGIONAL
- Founded: 2014
- Commenced operations: 27 October 2015
- Ceased operations: 30 July 2016
- Operating bases: Dunedin Airport
- Headquarters: Hamilton, New Zealand
- Key people: Ewan Wilson (Chief Executive)
- Website: flykiwiair.co.nz/

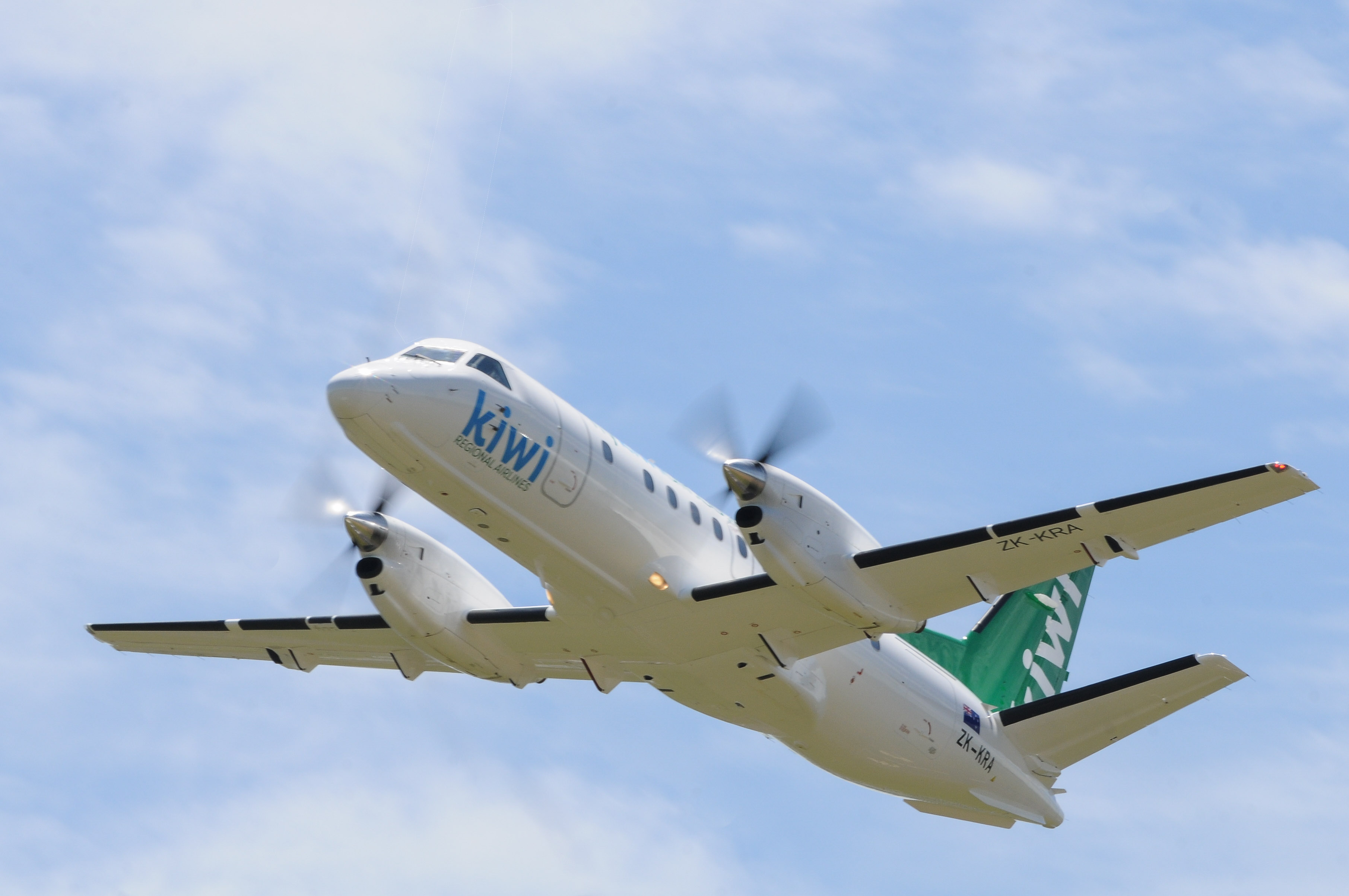
Kiwi Regional Saab 340 departing Hamilton for a flight to Nelson in November 2015

Kiwi Regional Airlines was an airline based in Hamilton, New Zealand which operated domestic flights within New Zealand between October 2015 and July 2016. It was founded in 2014 by local businessman Ewan Wilson, who previously was the CEO of Kiwi Travel International Airlines, and commenced operations on 27 October 2015. The airline owned and operated a single Saab 340A aircraft. The initial destinations were Hamilton, Nelson, Dunedin and Queenstown, with flights to Queenstown being dropped in November 2015 and Tauranga being added to the network in February 2016.

The airline announced on 17 June 2016 that it would be wound up by the beginning of August. The final flights operated on 30 July 2016, with the airline's sole aircraft subsequently being sold to Air Chathams.

== History ==
Kiwi Regional Airlines was founded in 2014 by Ewan Wilson, who had previously been the CEO of Kiwi Travel International Airlines between 1994 and 1996. Its first investor was 2 Cheap Cars with a 23% stake. In February 2015 the airline revealed its proposed route network, planning to serve Auckland, Hamilton, Tauranga, Palmerston North, Wellington, Blenheim, Nelson, Queenstown and Dunedin. The airline intended to serve Auckland using RNZAF Base Auckland at Whenuapai, part of which had served as the main commercial airport for Auckland until 1965 before becoming solely a military airfield. However, the government rejected the airline's plans to operate commercial flights from the base, citing a 2009 decision for it to remain as a military-only airfield due to concerns from local residents about noise.

On 24 June 2015, Kiwi Regional Airlines released an amended route network, that would see it initially serve four destinations using a single aircraft, with flights planned to commence on 27 September 2015. The airline also announced plans to begin operating a second aircraft and introduce new routes within 12 months. In July the company purchased a Saab 340A from SprintAir, and in August the planned date for commencement of services was changed to 27 October. Kiwi Regional received its air operator's certificate from the Civil Aviation Authority of New Zealand on 23 October 2015. Its first flight from Dunedin to Queenstown operated on 27 October 2015, and flights between Dunedin and Nelson; and Nelson and Hamilton; began the next day.

In November 2015, less than one month after commencing flights between Queenstown and Dunedin, the company announced it would be ceasing the flights with "low passenger bookings making it unsustainable for this service to continue." The airline considered expanding to either Tauranga or Napier. In December 2015 Kiwi Regional announced that flights between Nelson and Tauranga would commence on 15 February 2016. Flights from Nelson to Christchurch were announced in early 2016, but were cancelled in May 2016, in tandem with a reduction in frequencies across other routes due to reduced demand over winter.

On 17 June 2016, the airline announced that it would end its operations on 30 July 2016, selling its aircraft and transferring most of its staff to Air Chathams to operate a new service between Whanganui and Auckland.

== Destinations ==
The airline served the following destinations:

Destination	Airport	Begin	End	Ref.
Dunedin	Dunedin Airport	27 October 2015	30 July 2016	
Hamilton	Hamilton Airport	28 October 2015	30 July 2016	
Nelson	Nelson Airport	28 October 2015	30 July 2016	
Tauranga	Tauranga Airport	15 February 2016	30 July 2016	
Queenstown	Queenstown Airport	27 October 2015	30 November 2015	

== Fleet ==
The airline operated a single 34-seat Saab 340A.

Kiwi Regional Airlines fleet
Aircraft	Total	Orders	Passengers (Economy)
Saab 340A	1	-	34
Total	1	0	
