= Owhiro =

Owhiro may refer to one of several places in New Zealand:

- Brooklyn, Wellington, a Wellington suburb formerly known as Ohiro or Owhiro
- Owhiro, Otago, a rural area near Allanton in Otago
- Owhiro, Waikato, a small settlement on the shore of Kawhia Harbour
- Ōwhiro Bay, Wellington, formerly known as Owhiro Bay
- Owhiro Stream, a tributary of the Taieri River
