= IAR 826 =

IAR-826
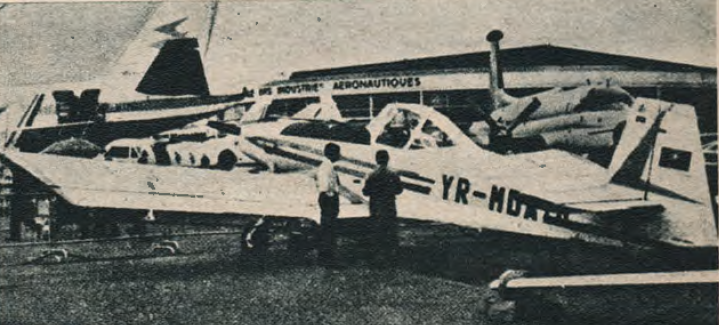

General information
- Type: Agricultural aircraft
- National origin: Romania
- Manufacturer: IRMA
- Designer: Radu Manicatide - IAR
- Primary user: Romanian Utilitary Aviation
- Number built: 13

History
- Introduction date: 1970
- First flight: 1973
- Variant: IAR 822

The IAR-826 was an agricultural aircraft built in Romania in the 1970s. Based on the IAR-822, it was a conventional low-wing monoplane with fixed, tailwheel undercarriage and differed from its predecessor mainly being a design for an all-metal version of the 822.

== Development ==
The IAR-826 is an agricultural crop sprayer and duster. It is the direct descendant of the IAR-822. The design was completed under the leadership of engineer Radu Manicatide in 1973, at IMFCA Bucharest (Institutul de Mecanica Fluidelor și Cercetări Aerospațiale — Institute of Fluid Mechanics and Aerospace Research).

Since the wooden structure technique was obsolete, the team led by Manicatide produced a design for an all-metal version of the 822. The IAR-826s were built at IAR Brasov in smaller numbers than the 822.

A low-wing monoplane, the fuselage skin was entirely made of aluminium and the controls and trimmer were electrically actuated. The all-metal structure, although much more stiffer, lowered even more the already weak thrust to weight ratio.

It was built at IRMA (Intreprinderea de Reparații Material Aeronautic — Enterprise for Aeronautical Material Repairement), in Bucharest.

== Operational history ==
Designated IAR-826, it first flew on 9 May 1973. Three weeks later the IAR-826 prototype, YR-MDA was displayed at Le Bourget.

IAR 826 were in use until the early 80's, with an average on 400 flight hours / year / airframe; being used mostly as agricultural planes, but sometimes also for the aerial surveillance of the pipe lines and power lines.

== Variants ==
IAR-826 13 examples built by IAR Brașov in 1973-74, registered in the YR-MDA to YR-MDM range.

== Operators ==
Romanian Utilitary Aviation — the only operator of the IAR-826

== Specifications (IAR-826) ==
General characteristics

- Crew: One pilot
- Capacity: 800 L (210 US Gal) of chemicals
- Length: 9.40 m (30 ft 10 in)
- Wingspan: 12.80 m (42 ft 0 in)
- Height: 2.80 m (9 ft 2 in)
- Wing area: 26.0 m^{2} (280 sq ft)
- Empty weight: 1,120 kg (2,460 lb)
- Gross weight: 1,900 kg (4,180 lb)
- Powerplant: 1 × Lycoming IO-540-G1D5 , 220 kW (290 hp)

Performance

- Maximum speed: 230 km/h (143 mph, 124 kn)
- Range: 350 km (220 mi, 190 nmi)
- Service ceiling: 4,500 m (14,800 ft)
- Rate of climb: 5.0 m/s (984 ft/min)

== See also ==
Aircraft of comparable role, configuration, and era IAR-822
