= IAR-822 =

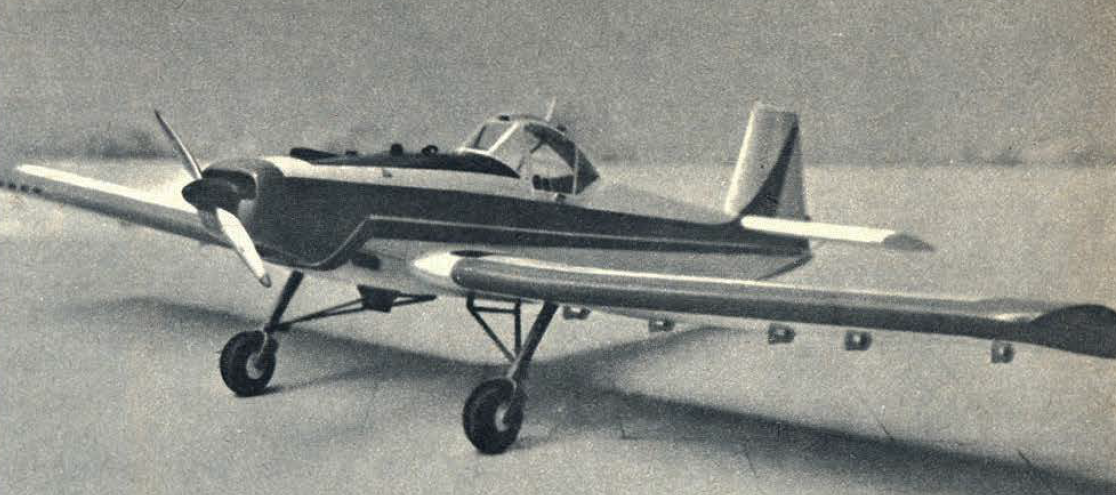

General information
- Type: Agricultural and training aircraft
- National origin: Romania
- Manufacturer: IRMA
- Designer: Radu Manicatide - IAR
- Primary users: Romanian Utilitary Aviation Romanian Air Force
- Number built: 30

History
- Introduction date: 1971
- First flight: 20 March 1970

The IAR-822 was an agricultural aircraft built in Romania in the 1960s. Based on the IAR-821, it was a conventional low-wing monoplane with fixed, tailwheel undercarriage and differed from its predecessor mainly in the choice of a horizontally opposed engine in place of a radial.

== Development ==
The IAR-822 is an agricultural crop sprayer and duster. It is the direct descendant of the IAR-821, from which it retains the fuselage. The design was completed under the leadership of Radu Manicatide in 1970, at IMFCA Bucharest (Institutul de Mecanica Fluidelor si Cercetari Aerospatiale - Institute of Fluid Mechanics and Aerospace Research).

A low-wing monoplane, it featured mixed wood-metal structure, with the fuselage and wing roots constructed from welded chrome-molybdenum tubing, with the outer wings and tail unit made from wood. The front fuselage had aluminium skin, while the rest of the surface was plywood covered with fabric.

The need for a trainer was addressed with the creation of the IAR-822B, which first flew on 12 November 1973 at Bucharest with Constantin Manolache at the controls. The chemical tank was replaced by the student pilot's seat, the instructor being in the rear (original) cockpit. The fuselage was entirely covered in aluminium and the controls and trimmer were electrically actuated. It served as a civilian trainer for the IAR 822 A and IAR 826 but also as a military trainer, being operated by the Air Force school at Boboc.

== Operational history ==
The prototype (registered YR-MCA) first flew on 20 March 1970, piloted by Constantin "Titi" Manolache, a renowned Romanian aerobatics and civilian test pilot. It was built at IRMA (Intreprinderea de Reparatii Material Aeronautic - Enterprise for Aeronautical Material Repairement), in Bucharest. The spraying/dusting equipment was certified during a flight on 10 August 1970. The first serial plane, YR-MCB, first flew on 14 June 1971.

The fourth built plane, was displayed at the General Aviation Salon at Cannes, France 24–25 May 1972, together with the Romanian made IS-28 glider and IS-24 light plane. It was also presented at the General Aviation Show at Hannover, the same year. However, no exports orders were received and the aircraft enjoyed little success even at home, mainly due to being underpowered.

IAR 822A was in use until the early 1980s, with an average of 400 flight hours/year/airframe. They were predominantly employed in the agricultural role, but were sometimes used for aerial surveillance of pipe lines and power lines.

At least five IAR-822 Bs were used by the Romanian Air Force for a brief period in 1974-75, probably to complement the tired IAR-813 in the primary training role until the IAR-823 entered service in sufficient numbers. The sole survivor is serial number 05, which can be seen (without tail unit and outer wings) at the Muzeul Aviatiei, Bucharest.

Twenty examples of the IAR-822A were produced by IRMA Bucharest in 1970-71. There were ten IAR-822Bs built by IRMA Bucharest in 1973-74.

== Variants ==
IAR-822A
Basic version agricultural crop sprayer and duster
IAR-822B
Tandem two-seat trainer, 10 examples built by IRMA Bucharest in 1973-74.

== Operators ==
Romania

- Romanian Utilitary Aviation - the only operator of the IAR-822A
- Romanian Air Force - used at least 5 IAR-822B for a brief period

== Specifications (IAR-822 - with agricultural equipment) ==
Data from Jane's All The World's Aircraft 1976–77

General characteristics

- Crew: 1
- Capacity:
- 600 L (159 US gal; 132 imp gal) liquids or
- 630 kg (1,389 lb) solid chemicals
- Length: 9.40 m (30 ft 10 in)
- Wingspan: 12.80 m (42 ft 0 in)
- Height: 2.578 m (8 ft 5 1/2 in) (tail down)
- Wing area: 26.00 m^{2} (279.9 sq ft)
- Aspect ratio: 6.3:1
- Empty weight: 1,080 kg (2,381 lb)
- Gross weight: 1,900 kg (4,189 lb)
- Powerplant: 1 × Lycoming IO-540-G1-D5 air-cooled flat-six, 220 kW (290 hp)

Performance

- Maximum speed: 180 km/h (110 mph, 97 kn)
- Cruise speed: 120–160 km/h (75–99 mph, 65–86 kn) (operating speed)
- Stall speed: 74 km/h (46 mph, 40 kn) (flaps extended, power on)
- Never exceed speed: 250 km/h (160 mph, 130 kn)
- Range: 450 km (280 mi, 240 nmi) (no reserves)
- Endurance: 3 hr
- Service ceiling: 3,000 m (9,800 ft)
- Rate of climb: 3.50 m/s (689 ft/min)
- Take off run to 15 m (50 ft): 360 m (1,181 ft)
- Landing run from 15 m (50 ft): 300 m (984 ft)

== See also ==
Aircraft of comparable role, configuration, and era IAR 826
