= Hamilton Airport (New Zealand) =

Airport in the Waikato Region of New Zealand

Hamilton Airport Taunga Waka Rererangi o Kirikiriroa
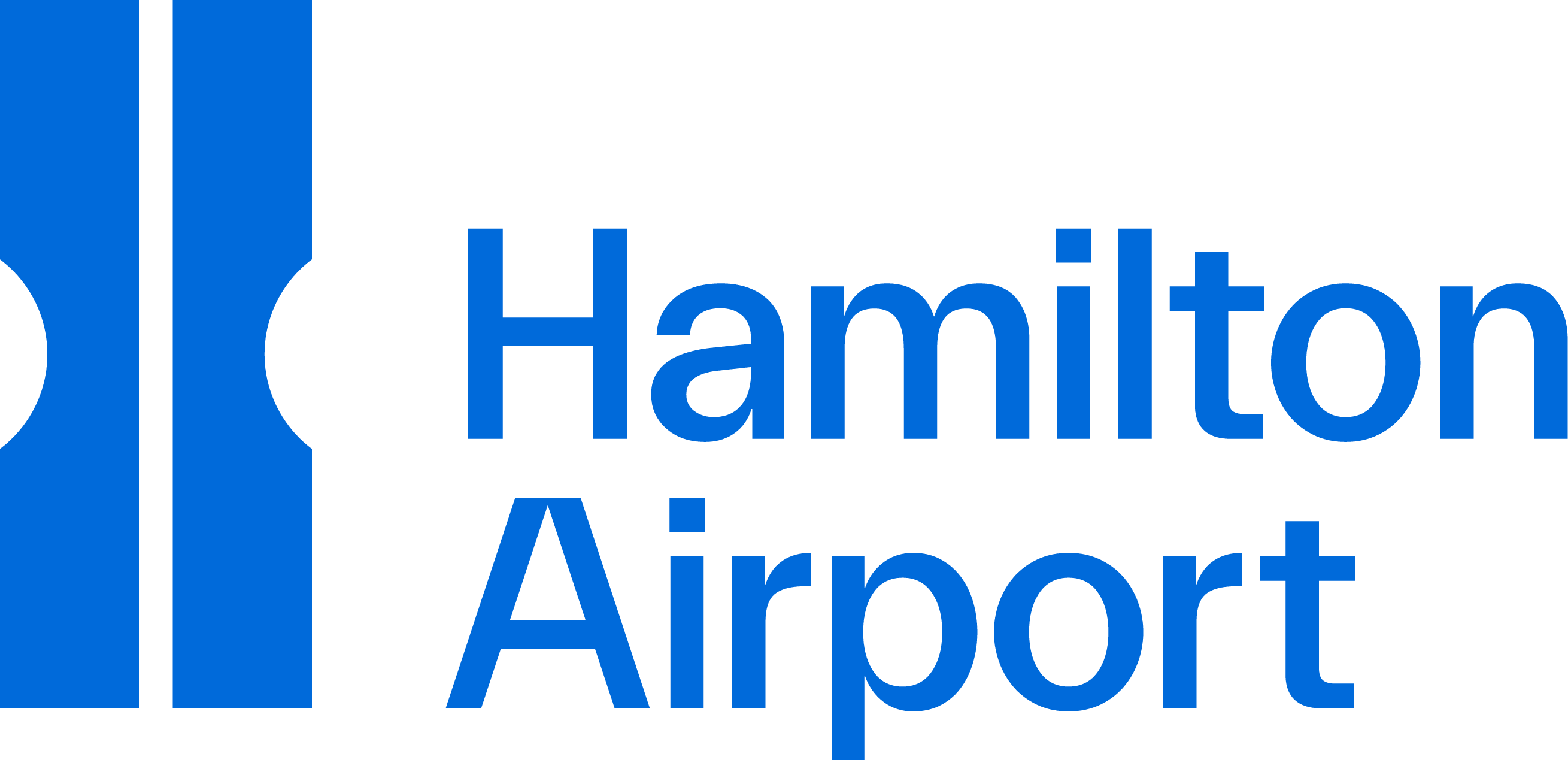
- IATA: HLZ; ICAO: NZHN

Summary
- Airport type: Public
- Operator: Hamilton Airport
- Location: Waipa District
- Elevation AMSL: 52 m (171 ft)
- Coordinates: 37°52′0″S 175°19′55″E
- Website: hamiltonairport.co.nz

Map
- Location of airport in North Island

Runways
Direction	Length		Surface
Direction	m	ft	Surface
18L/36R	2,195	6,754	Asphalt
18R/36L	630	2,066	Asphalt
07/25	720	2,034	Grass

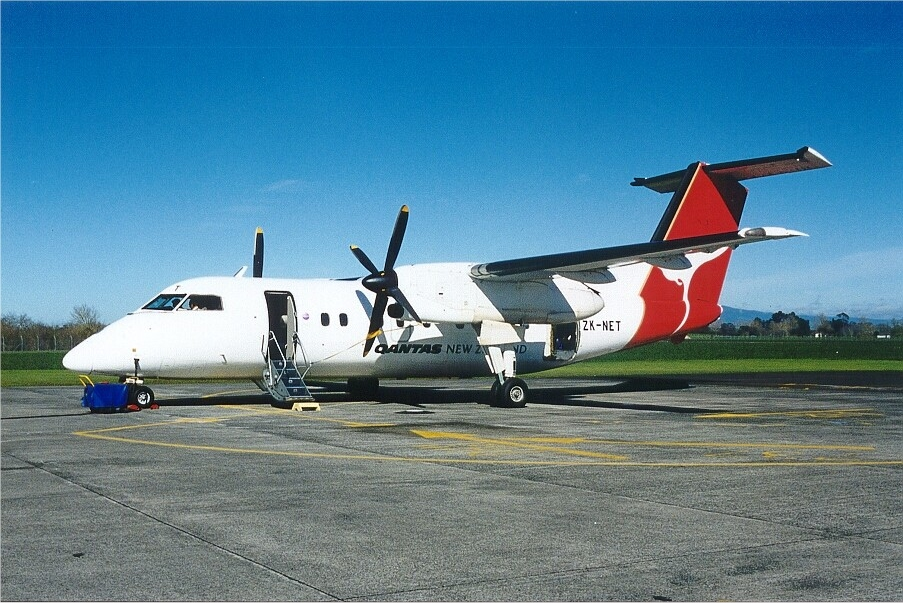
A Qantas New Zealand Dash 8 at Hamilton, September 2000

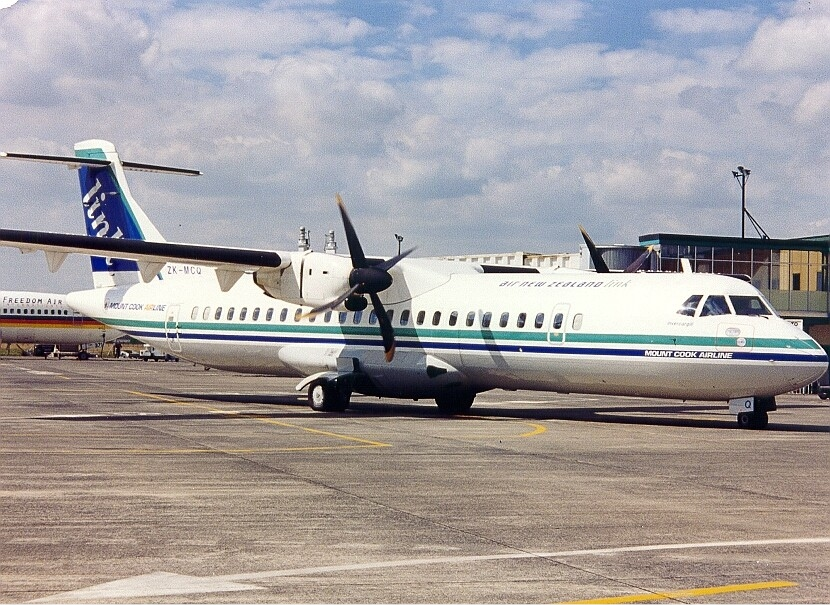
A Mount Cook ATR 72-200 in the old Air New Zealand Link colours at Hamilton Airport in 1997

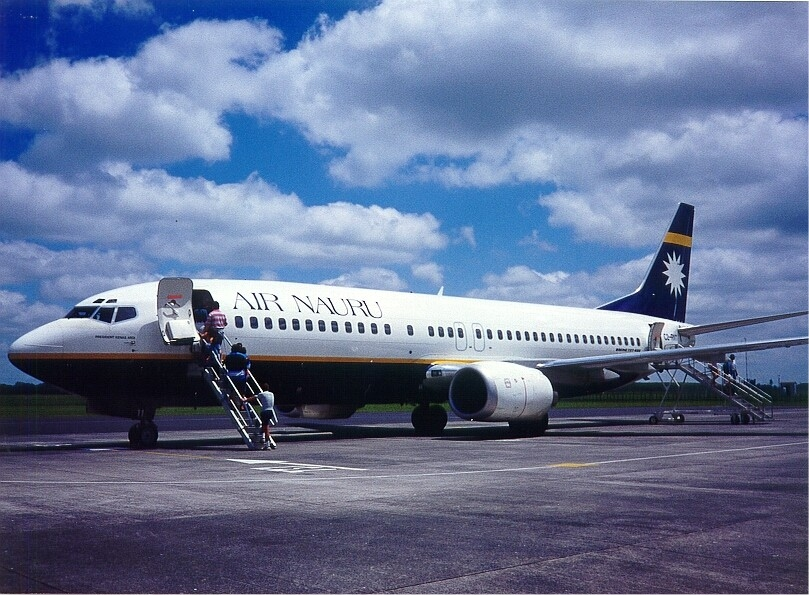
An Air Nauru Boeing 737-400 operating for Kiwi Air at Hamilton in 1995

Hamilton Airport (IATA: HLZ, ICAO: NZHN) is an international airport at Rukuhia, 14 kilometres south of the city of Hamilton in the Waikato region, in New Zealand. Rukuhia was the name of the Royal New Zealand Air Force base on the site during World War II.

== Passenger numbers ==
In the year to 30 June 2011 the airport had 316,000 domestic and 46,000 international passengers. In 2017/18 there were 353,000 passengers, all domestic, 54% of them to Wellington and 37% to Christchurch. Hamilton is the eleventh-busiest airport in New Zealand by passenger traffic.

== History ==
The airport is on land formerly owned by Samuel Steele (brother of William Steele, who brought militia-settlers from Sydney to Hamilton in 1864) from about 1880. By 1929 there was a landing ground on the farm, though a site close to the city was also considered. In 1935 Steele's aerodrome was sold for expansion into an airport and opened by the mayor on 12 October.

As the world prepared for war, it became clear that a landing strip needed to be constructed in the Hamilton area. By 1935, the air strip was already in service, as a stopover for military aircraft that would land after a long journey. Services provided refueling as well as food and rest for the incoming pilots. Royal New Zealand Air Force (RNZAF) Rukuhia was officially opened on 12 August 1942. In the postwar period the base was used for the storage and scrapping of surplus RNZAF aircraft.

Travel by air began to blossom soon after the war was over, and, in 1950, the airport received its first commercial flight. The main runway was sealed in 1965, and turboprop flights began to Hamilton that year, with NAC's Fokker F27 Friendship aircraft operating. The runway was further lengthened to accommodate Vickers Viscount, 1970, and ultimately Boeing 737 aircraft types in 1975.

In 1989, the New Zealand government sold the airport to councils representing Hamilton City (50 per cent), Waikato District (15.625 per cent), Waipa District (15.625 per cent), Matamata-Piako District (15.625 per cent) and Ōtorohanga District (3.125 per cent). This development led to unprecedented growth for the airport.

Ansett New Zealand built an independent passenger terminal to the south of the main building, equipping it with a Golden Wing Club lounge and food vending machines. Ansett NZ operated flights to Wellington from Hamilton from 1995 until 2000, when Ansett NZ was sold to a New Zealand business consortium and rebranded Qantas NZ, with their own New Zealand domestic flights division. Qantas NZ operated at the airport until 2001, when it went into receivership. The terminal was then occupied by Origin Pacific airlines. This airline operated domestic services until it too went bankrupt in 2006. The small terminal was then left unused.

In 1998, Hamilton Airport Motor Inn was developed to cater for travellers using the airport. It was purchased by the airport company in 2019 and is operated as JetPark Hotel Hamilton Airport & Conference Centre.

A NZ$15.3 million terminal expansion begun in 2005 featured a 60 per cent increase in floorspace with improved baggage handling areas, better international and domestic check-in space, and passenger security screening. It was completed in late 2007.

Hugh McCarroll was the airport's chief executive from the early 2000s until retirement in February 2006. The current chief executive is Mark Morgan.

=== Trans-Tasman services ===
In 1994, the airport became a terminal for trans-Tasman air routes, with charter flights provided on Boeing 727s by Kiwi Travel International Airlines (not to be confused with the United States–based Kiwi International Air Lines) which served Brisbane, Sydney and Melbourne. New Zealand's Kiwi went bankrupt in 1996, but by that time Freedom Air had begun flying the same routes and a route to the Gold Coast with Boeing 737s. They also, briefly, operated flights to Nadi, Fiji, in 2005.

Freedom Air ultimately decided to make Hamilton International Airport their company hub until parent company Air New Zealand closed the airline down on 30 March 2008 operating its own full service instead. By then, the Airbus A320 was being operated. When passenger numbers dropped to an unsustainable level in August 2009, Air New Zealand ceased services from Hamilton to Australia.

However by that time Virgin Australia operated flights from Hamilton with thrice-weekly Boeing 737-800 flights to Brisbane and Sydney; however, passenger numbers remained low and Virgin Australia ended flights on 27 October 2012.

In 2024 Jetstar announced that it would serve Hamilton from Sydney and the Gold Coast using their Airbus A320 aircraft from June 2025. On June 16, 2025 the first Jetstar plane landed in Hamilton from Sydney and on 18 June the first Jetstar flight from the Gold Coast landed.

=== Flight training ===
Hamilton Airport was home to the New Zealand Training Centre of L3Harris Airline Academy. L3Harris Airline Academy is the British flight training division of L3Harris that provides freshly trained airline pilots to numerous airlines throughout the world, mainly within the United Kingdom, most notably EasyJet, and also including British Airways, Qatar, Flybe, Thomson, Oman and, formerly, Thomas Cook and Monarch Airlines among others. Most of the non-passenger traffic at this airport was generated by L3Harris training flights, in single-engined Diamond DA20 and Cessna 172, and twin-engined Diamond DA42 Twin Star aircraft. The school closed in February 2021, with all training moving to the UK and Portugal. The company cited the COVID-19 pandemic as a cause, but not the sole reason

The Waikato Aero Club has been based at Hamilton Airport since 1933. The club provides a full range of flight training from recreational flying in Light Sport Aircraft through to the New Zealand Diploma in Aviation.

== Capabilities ==
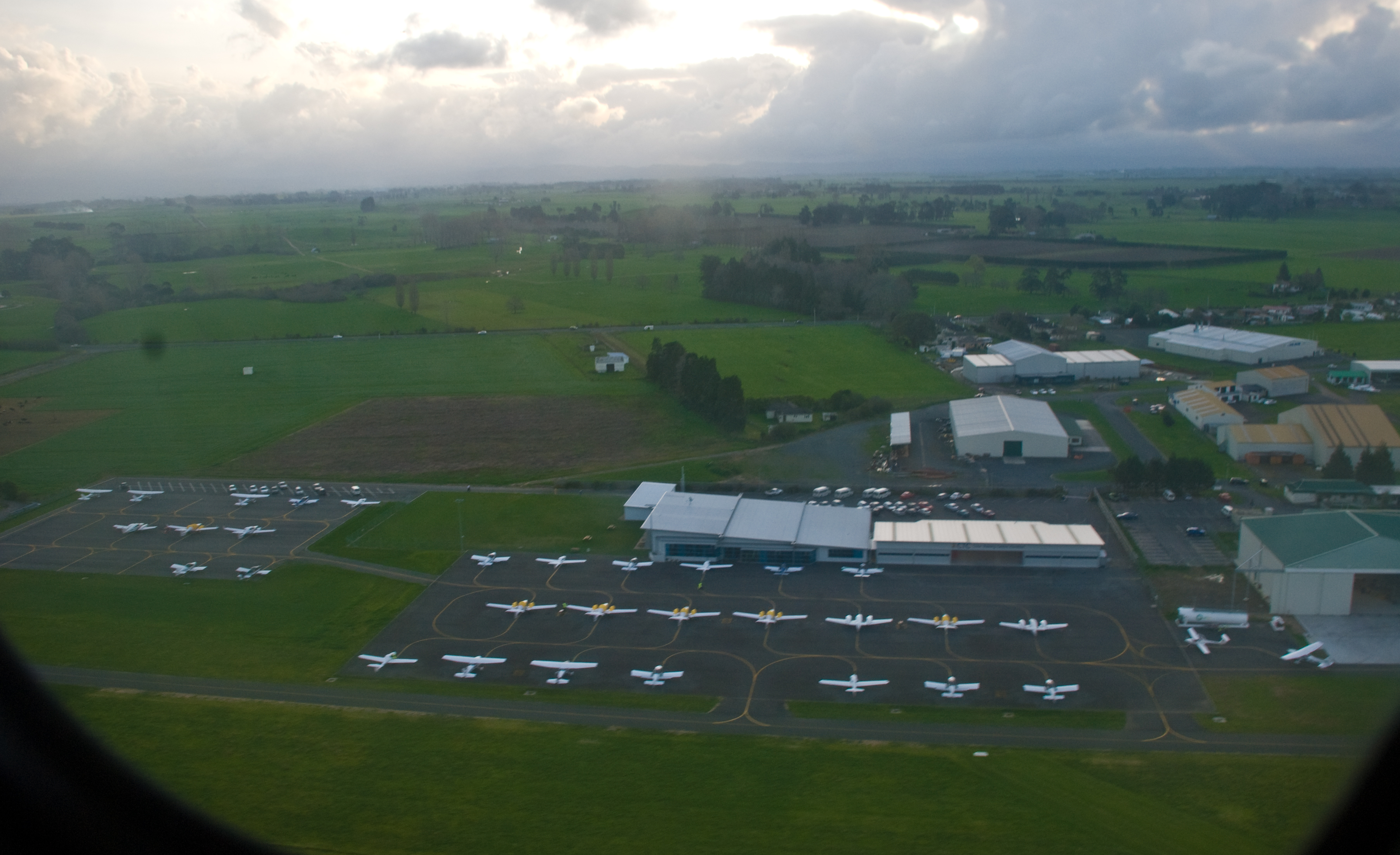
Overview of parked aircraft at the airport

The airport currently accommodates many different types of aircraft, from piston-engined light aircraft to commercial turboprop aircraft such as the ATR 72. The airport can handle all light business jets as well as 40-to-80-seat regional jets such as the Embraer E195 and Bombardier CRJ200. Several airliners can operate from the airport including the 100–200 seat Boeing 737, Boeing 757 and Airbus A320. The largest aircraft authorised to land at Hamilton is the 150-to-250-seat Boeing 767. Plans to increase runway length from 2,195m to 3,000m to attract larger aircraft and start Asian regional flights, have been considered.

The airport operates 24 hours a day, seven days a week. Though the tower is not active 24/7, Bay Approach or Christchurch Information can provide Airways services instead.

In March 2026, approval was granted for a 255 m runway extension, bringing the total runway length to 2,450 m, supported by a NZ$6.5 million loan from the New Zealand Government. The extended runway length is intended to be comparable to secondary airports in other parts of the world, such as the Gold Coast. The works are also expected to include upgrades to accommodate 787 and A330 aircraft. Physical work for the project is expected to commence towards the end of 2026 and take 12 months to complete.

The airport has a single terminal building and six tarmac gates. The apron is capable of accommodating up to five A320 or 737-800 aircraft at once.

== Airlines and destinations ==
Airlines	Destinations
Air New Zealand	Christchurch, Wellington Queenstown (Begins June 2027),
Jetstar	Christchurch, Gold Coast, Sydney
Sunair	Gisborne, Napier, Whakatāne, Whangārei

== See also ==
- List of airports in New Zealand
- List of airlines of New Zealand
