= 2 Cheap Cars =

New Zealand car dealership group

- Type: Public
- Traded as: NZX: 2CC
- Industry: Automobiles
- Founded: 2011
- Headquarters: Auckland, New Zealand
- Area served: Oceania; Japan; North America
- Website: www.2cheapcars.co.nz

2 Cheap Cars is a used car dealership group in New Zealand. It was founded in 2011 by Eugene Williams, who went on to create a rival chain, NZ Cheap Cars and Yusuke Sena. The company specialise in selling Japanese imported cars in New Zealand.

== History ==
The company was founded in June 2011 in Auckland, New Zealand. In 2014, they were ranked as number two on the Deloitte Fast 50 and the Fastest Growing Retail or Consumer Business in the Auckland and upper North Island region, also on the Deloitte Fast 50. This was attributed to their primarily online business model, their New Zealand Automobile Association appraisals for the cars that they sold and reliance upon customer reviews. Later in 2014, they were founder investors of Kiwi Regional Airlines with a 23% shareholding but in 2015, they sold their shares due to the issuing of new shares diluting their percentage to 10%. In 2015, 2 Cheap Cars started parallel importing of new cars from Honda, Toyota and Mazda. The company received a "cease and desist" notice from the car giant Honda in May 2015, claiming that 2 Cheap Cars's advertisement of the Honda Jazz would mislead consumers, resulting in the low sales of the new car manufacturers including Honda. In July 2015, there was an alleged racist incident between the employees and boss of the company that led to a strike in the company's Auckland's based outlet. The company claimed that the car groomers were incorrect, and were being misled and manipulated. By 2016, the company had sixteen showrooms throughout New Zealand.

The company was criticized in February 2016, when it used Maori cultural symbols in an advertisement to promote its Waitangi Day sale. The company claimed it was not trying to cause controversy and questioned why it was wrong to depict a Pākehā girl "join[ing] in with Māori culture". The video was posted online to YouTube and Facebook, a decision negatively critiqued by the press.

In 2017 2 Cheap Cars established a subsidiary in Japan. That year the company was placed on a 24-month stand-down from recruiting migrant workers for failing to comply with employment standards. By 2019, the company owned a business in Japan to assist with the purchasing of cars for sale. That same year the company hired a new CEO, international clothing brand Huffer founder Dan Buckley. He left the company in February, 2020. In 2019, the company floated on the New Zealand Stock Exchange.

In July 2019, 2 Cheap Cars was fined $438,000 for having customers sign warranty waiver documents if they did not purchase an extended warranty. The document misled customers into thinking that they would not have the protection of the Consumer Guarantees Act 1993. In March 2020, 2 Cheap Cars were criticised by the public in the use of COVID-19 imagery in its advertising. In February 2021, the parent company of 2 Cheap Cars, NZ Automotive Investments listed on the main board of the New Zealand stock exchange under the ticker code NZA.

In February 2023, former National Sales Manager Michael Yang is appointed Managing Director of Rival car dealer NZ Cheap Cars.

== 2016 advertising controversy ==
In 2016, 2 Cheap Cars ran a television advertisement in which a Japanese car salesman responded to every one of the customer's requests with "Ah, so". When asked to stop saying "ah, so" at the end of the advertisement, he said "Ah, sold!" The advertisement was criticized for featuring stereotypes about Japanese people. 2 Cheap Cars responded that their directors were Japanese and did not find it offensive. It received the most complaints in New Zealand in 2016, with the Advertising Standards Authority receiving 27 complaints about it. In February 2017, 2 Cheap Cars pulled the commercial from television after children started copying the character, with some of them pronouncing the catchphrase as "arsehole". The 2 Cheap Cars marketing manager said that they used controversial advertising to draw attention to their brand but that they would likely not do it again due to their growth.

== Achievements ==
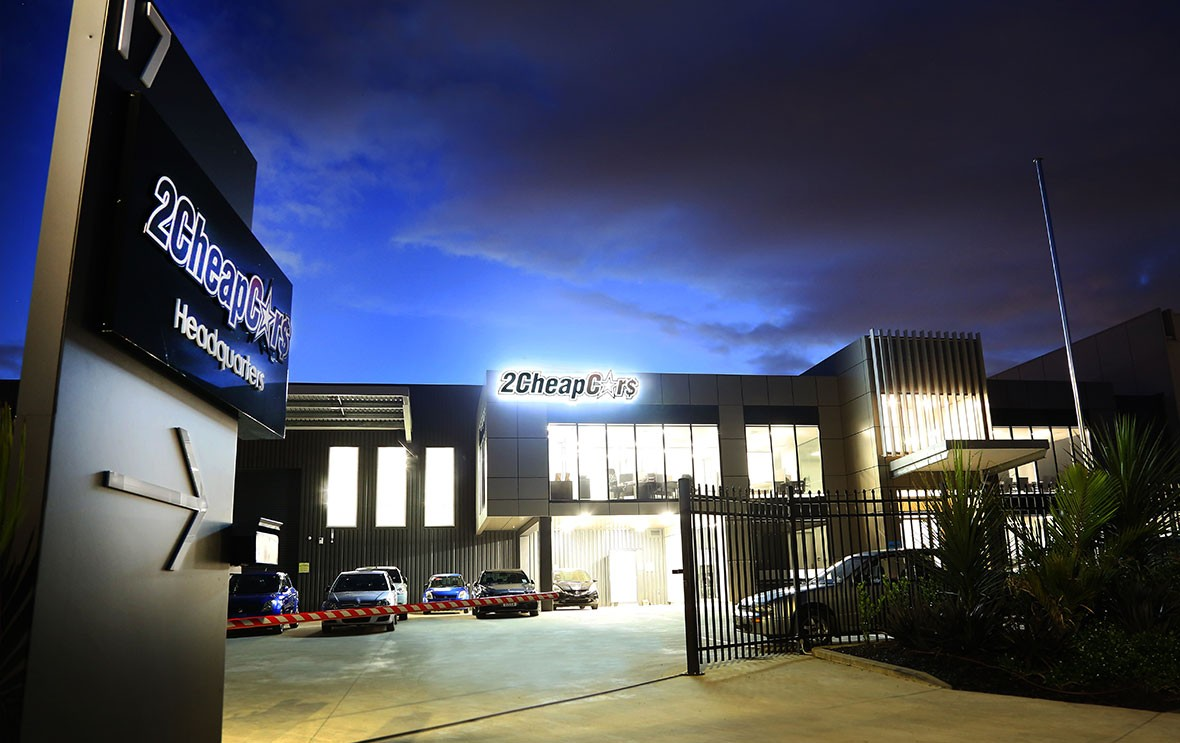
2 Cheap Cars HQ

In November 2020, 2 Cheap Cars was Awarded the Silver Award in the Reader's Digest Quality Service Awards.
