= Allanton, New Zealand =

Allanton
- Rural settlement
- Interactive map of Allanton
- Coordinates: 45°55′S 170°16′E
- Country: New Zealand
- Island: South Island
- Region: Otago
- District: Dunedin
- Community board: Mosgiel-Taieri Community Board
- Electorates: Taieri; Te Tai Tonga (Māori)

Government
  - Territorial authority: Dunedin City Council
  - Regional council: Otago Regional Council
  - Mayor of Dunedin: Sophie Barker
  - Taieri MP: Ingrid Leary
  - Te Tai Tonga MP: Tākuta Ferris

Area
  - Total: 0.79 km^{2} (0.31 sq mi)

Population (June 2025)
  - Total: 370
  - Density: 470/km^{2} (1,200/sq mi)
- Time zone: UTC+12 (NZST)
  - Summer (DST): UTC+13 (NZDT)
- Postcode: 9092
- Area code: 03
- Local iwi: Ngāi Tahu

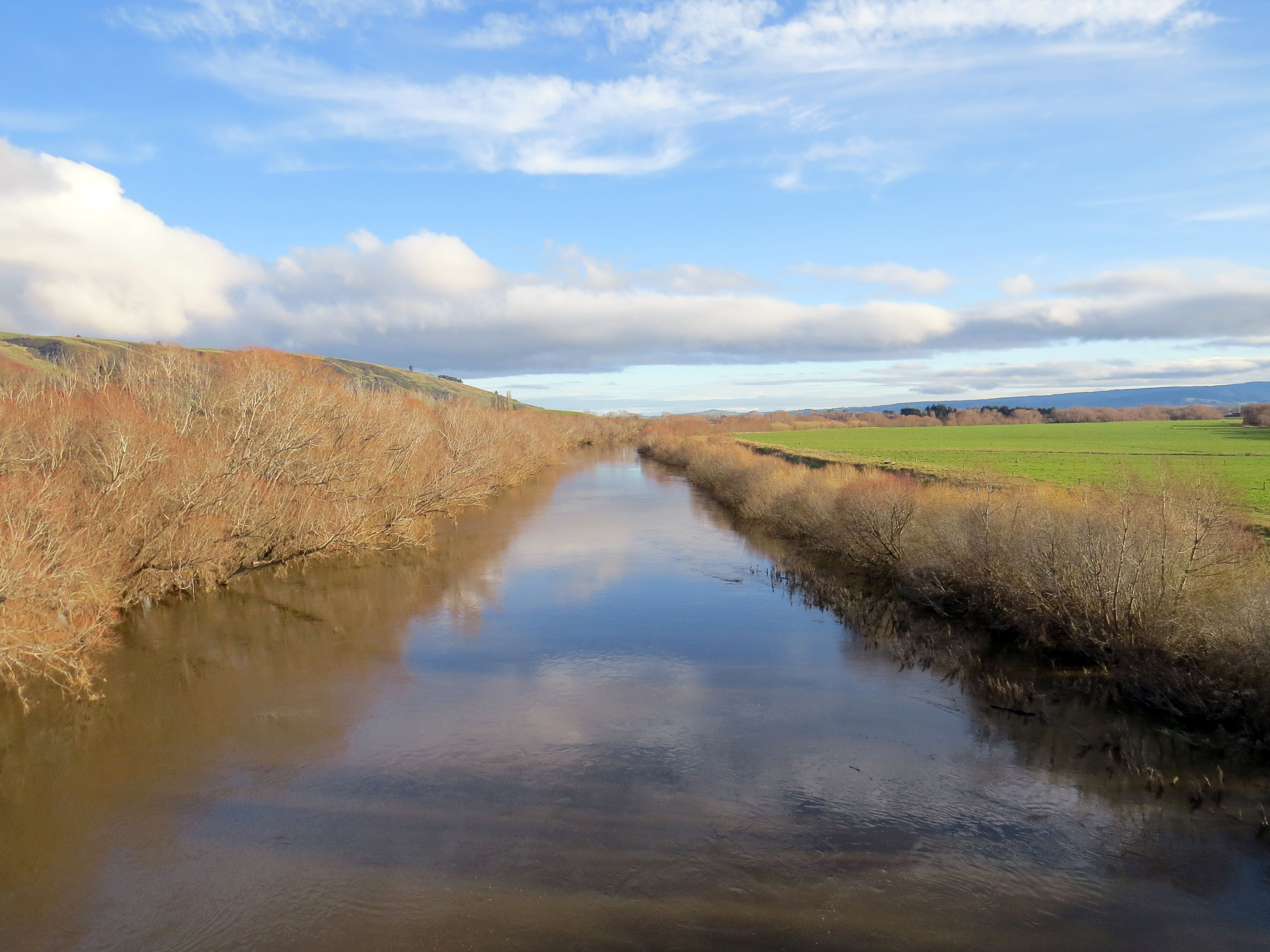
The Upper Taieri River at Allanton, New Zealand.

Allanton (Māori: Ōwhiro) is a small town in Otago, New Zealand, located some 20 kilometres southwest of Dunedin on State Highway 1. The settlement lies at the eastern edge of the Taieri Plains close to the Taieri River at the junction of the main road to Dunedin International Airport at Momona.

Established near the junction of the Taieri River and Ōwhiro Stream the site was first known to Europeans as "Scroggs' Creek Landing" after Samuel Scroggs, a member of Charles Kettle's survey teams. The surrounding area was (and still is) known as Owhiro. In 1875, with the arrival of the railway south from Dunedin; and satisfying criteria for a "town", the community was renamed Greytown - after former Governor Sir George Grey. Among those who took up land in the growing community were immigrant Poles, from among the "Brogdenites" who had constructed the railway. Several Polish surnames survive in the local community.

In 1895 a conflict of identity was recognised between the local community and another Greytown, well established in the Wairarapa. The Taieri County Council met and agreed to again rename the community. By a unanimous decision it was given the name "Allanton" - as a gesture of respect for the late James Allan of nearby "Hopehill", a former Otago Provincial Councillor, County Councillor and East Taieri Church Elder.

Allanton's community has declined in recent years, with the local school closing in 2004 and the Sacred Heart Catholic Church closing the following year. The final shop to close was the 'Honey Shoppe', which closed in 2011.

== Demographics ==
Allanton is described by Statistics New Zealand as a rural settlement. It covers 0.79 km^{2} (0.31 sq mi), and had an estimated population of 370 as of June 2025, with a population density of 468 people per km^{2}. It is part of the much larger Momona statistical area.

Historical population
Year	Pop.	±% p.a.
2006	240	—
2013	255	+0.87%
2018	306	+3.71%

Allanton had a population of 306 at the 2018 New Zealand census, an increase of 51 people (20.0%) since the 2013 census, and an increase of 66 people (27.5%) since the 2006 census. There were 126 households, comprising 153 males and 150 females, giving a sex ratio of 1.02 males per female, with 54 people (17.6%) aged under 15 years, 39 (12.7%) aged 15 to 29, 162 (52.9%) aged 30 to 64, and 45 (14.7%) aged 65 or older.

Ethnicities were 95.1% European/Pākehā, 5.9% Māori, and 1.0% Pasifika. People may identify with more than one ethnicity.

Although some people chose not to answer the census's question about religious affiliation, 62.7% had no religion, 25.5% were Christian and 1.0% had other religions.

Of those at least 15 years old, 33 (13.1%) people had a bachelor's or higher degree, and 54 (21.4%) people had no formal qualifications. 42 people (16.7%) earned over $70,000 compared to 17.2% nationally. The employment status of those at least 15 was that 150 (59.5%) people were employed full-time, 30 (11.9%) were part-time, and 3 (1.2%) were unemployed.

== Education ==
The Dunedin campus of OneSchool Global is at Allanton. OneSchool Global is an international private composite school.

The local state primary school was merged to East Taieri School in 2004.
