= Huffer =

New Zealand clothing company (1997)

- Type: Private
- Industry: Retail
- Genre: Streetwear
- Founded: 1997 in New Zealand
- Founders: Steve Dunstan, Daniel Buckley
- Headquarters: Auckland, New Zealand, New Zealand
- Number of locations: 16 (2024)
- Area served: New Zealand, Australia
- Products: Apparel
- Owner: Steve Dunstan, Kate Berry, Josh Prier
- Number of employees: 200 (2024)
- Parent: Huffer Direct Limited
- Website: www.huffer.co.nz www.huffer.com.au

Huffer is a New Zealand clothing brand and company started in the late 1990s by New Zealanders Steve Dunstan and Daniel Buckley. The company originally produced and sold outdoors clothing primarily directed towards snowboarders but it has since evolved to become a popular streetwear brand in New Zealand and Australia.

== History ==
Huffer had its origins in the New Zealand professional snowboarding scene in the late 1990s which was then a reasonably small and close-knit community. According to Dunstan, at the time, snowboarders "didn’t want to wear ski overalls because you want to look like a skateboarder on the snow" and there was demand for well-designed, casual clothing that could withstand the elements of New Zealand's freezing alpine conditions. Initially, the company's first production runs were directed solely at the snowboarding community but by the end of 1997 the company had expanded its reach into a number of retail clothing stockists and had begun to also target the skateboarding community through lighter-weight summer items.

In 1998, Huffer first began producing Kiwiana-themed t-shirts featuring classic local motifs. Within several years the popularity of these designs had helped grow recognition of the brand and allowed it to gain shelfspace in up-market retailers in Wellington and other larger urban centres across New Zealand.

In the mid-2000s, Huffer continued to expand across New Zealand and into Australia including opening a store in Bondi, an area popular with New Zealanders living in Australia. In 2011, the company launched its own-brand retail outlets where only its merchandise would be sold. By 2018, the company had eight of these stores across locations in New Zealand and an additional three in Australia. The company also had a foray into the United States market, including supplying to Urban Outfitters.

Co-founder Daniel Buckley sold his share in the company in 2012. In 2019 he was appointed as chief executive officer of the New Zealand used car dealership chain 2 Cheap Cars.

In July 2026, it was alleged that Huffer was using AI generated images that was based on human models.

== Style ==
The early success of the Huffer brand has been attributed to its popularity in the snowboarding scenes. The brand was also embraced by the skateboarding scene and other subcultures. In a 2017 interview, the only founder still involved with the business, Steve Dunstan, said that the company had since "evolved from a skate and snowboard brand to a more contemporary lifestyle brand."

== Red Carpet Appearances ==
One of Huffer's designs attained widespread recognition on the back of a plug by actor Orlando Bloom who sported it at the 2003 premiere of the New Zealand-made film Lord of the Rings: Return of the King in Wellington. The design riffed on the I Love NY design by substituting the stylized heart with the Huffer separated triskelion design.

In 2019, Huffer's brand received additional attention when American rapper Post Malone posted an image of himself on Instagram wearing a fluorescent yellow Huffer jacket. The item of clothing had been provided to him by Huffer during his 2019 tour of New Zealand but the company had not entered into any promotional arrangement with Malone.

== See also ==
- Stüssy
- Hallenstein Brothers
