= Freedom Air =

New Zealand airline

IATA	ICAO	Call sign
SJ	FOM	FREE AIR
- Founded: 1995
- Commenced operations: 8 December 1995
- Ceased operations: 30 March 2008
- Hubs: Auckland Airport
- Fleet size: 11
- Destinations: 13
- Parent company: Air New Zealand
- Headquarters: Auckland, New Zealand
- Key people: Rob Fyfe (CEO)
- Website: www.freedomair.com

Freedom Air was a New Zealand low-cost airline which operated from December 1995 until March 2008. It operated scheduled passenger services from New Zealand to Australia and Fiji, and charter services within New Zealand. It was a subsidiary of Air New Zealand.

== History ==
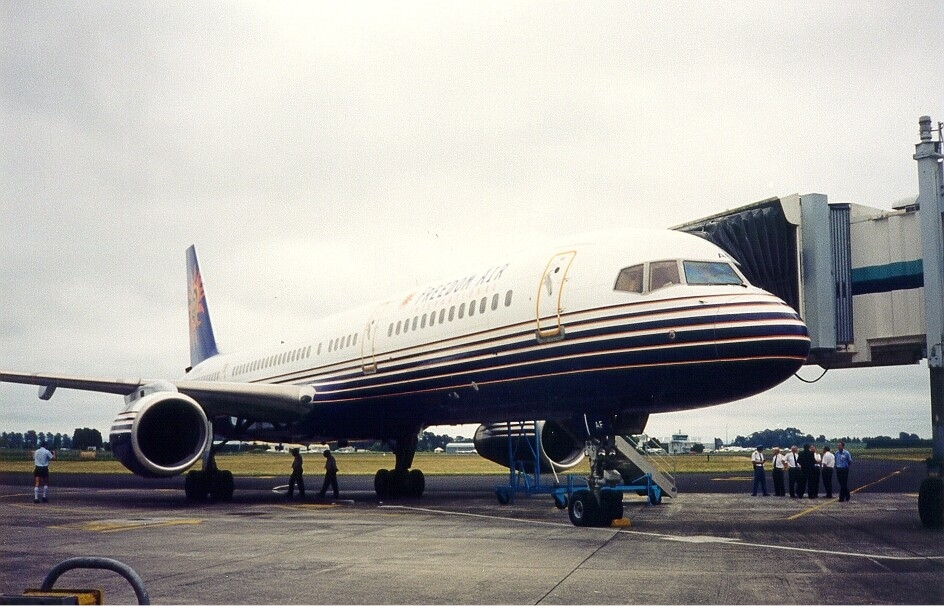
Freedom Air's leased Boeing 757-200 at Hamilton Airport, used on its inaugural flight in 1995

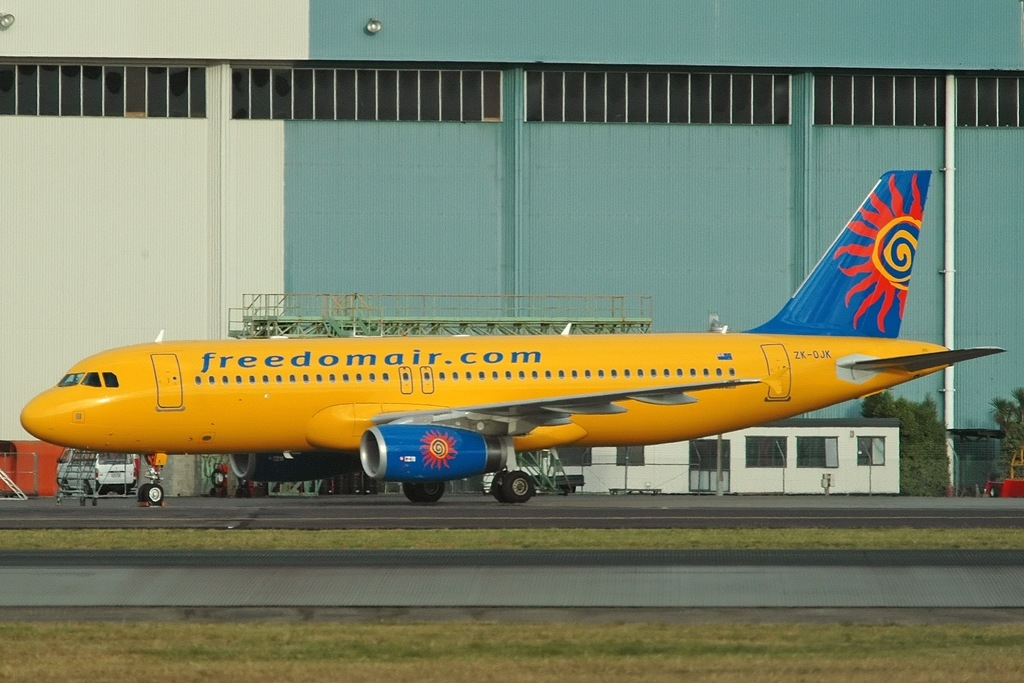
A Freedom Air Airbus A320-200 at Christchurch Airport in 2006

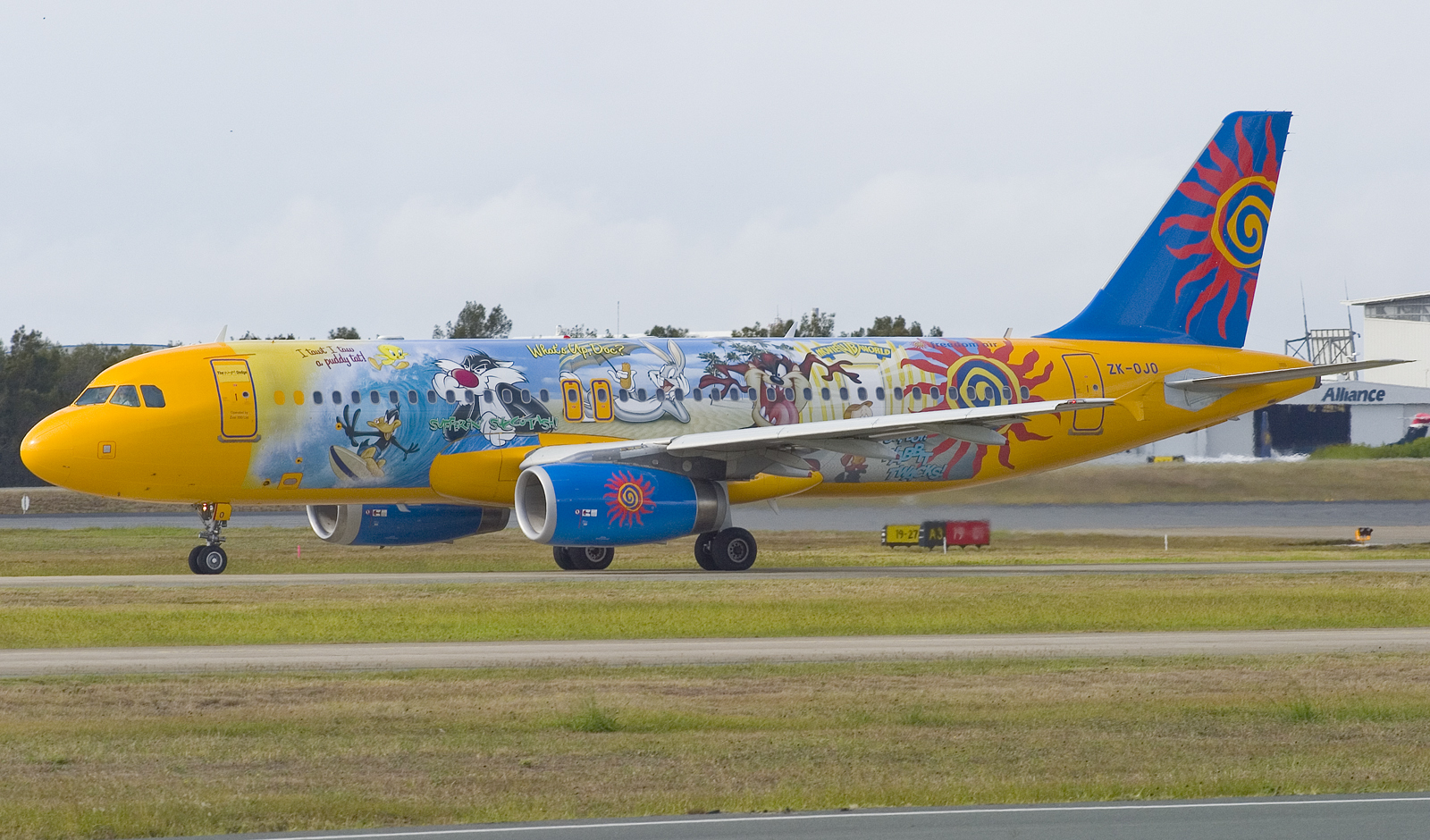
A Freedom Air Airbus A320-200 with a special livery to promote Warner Bros. Movie World

Freedom Air was established in 1995 as a response to the commencement of discount services between New Zealand and Australia by Kiwi Travel International Airlines and started operations on 8 December 1995 with a single Boeing 757-200. It was formed as South Pacific Air Charters by Mount Cook Airline and renamed Freedom Air International in 1998.

In May 2001, Freedom Air begain operating domestic services between Auckland, Wellington and Christchurch. By 2004, its fleet had expanded to five Boeing 737-300s, and it was providing direct non-stop services to the Australian cities of Brisbane, Gold Coast, Newcastle, Sydney and Melbourne from Hamilton, Auckland, Wellington, Christchurch, Dunedin and Palmerston North. Flights to Fiji were also operated.

In June 2006, the aircraft from Freedom Air were combined with Air New Zealand's fleet of Airbus A320-200s under the air operator's certificate of Zeal320. When the airline ceased Zeal320 had one aircraft painted in Freedom Air livery.

Air New Zealand ceased all Freedom Air operations from the end of March 2008.

== Destinations ==
Throughout its existence, Freedom Air flew to six destinations in New Zealand, five in Australia and one in Fiji. When the airline shut down on 30 March 2008, all services were replaced by Air New Zealand flights, except flights out of Palmerston North, which left the airport without any international services. Flights to Nadi and Newcastle were withdrawn prior to 2008.

- Australia
  - Brisbane – Brisbane Airport
  - Gold Coast – Gold Coast Airport
  - Melbourne – Melbourne Airport
  - Newcastle – Newcastle Airport
  - Sydney – Sydney Airport
- Fiji
  - Nadi – Nadi International Airport
- New Zealand
  - Auckland – Auckland Airport (Hub)
  - Christchurch – Christchurch Airport
  - Dunedin – Dunedin Airport
  - Hamilton – Hamilton Airport
  - Palmerston North – Palmerston North Airport
  - Wellington – Wellington Airport

== Fleet ==
Freedom Air had operated the following aircraft:

Freedom Air fleet
Aircraft	Total	Introduced	Retired	Notes
Airbus A320-200	13	2005	2008	3 leased from Air New Zealand
Boeing 737-200	2	2001	2001	1 leased from Airwork
Boeing 737-300	9	1996	2006	3 leased from Air New Zealand; 2 leased from TACA Airlines; 1 leased from Polynesian Airlines; 1 leased from Transavia
Boeing 757-200	1	1995	1996	Leased from Britannia Airways
