= Momona =

Locality in Otago, New Zealand

- Rural locality
- Interactive map of Momona
- Coordinates: 45°55′S 170°13′E
- Country: New Zealand
- Region: Otago
- District: Dunedin
- Community board: Mosgiel-Taieri Community Board
- Electorates: Taieri; Te Tai Tonga (Māori)

Government
  - Territorial authority: Dunedin City Council
  - Regional council: Otago Regional Council
  - Mayor of Dunedin: Sophie Barker
  - Taieri MP: Ingrid Leary
  - Te Tai Tonga MP: Tākuta Ferris
- Time zone: UTC+12 (NZST)
  - Summer (DST): UTC+13 (NZDT)
- Postcode: 9073
- Local iwi: Ngāi Tahu

Momona is a small town on the Taieri Plain in New Zealand's South Island. Momona School was established in 1899 and closed in 2004. The Henley Co-operative Dairy Company, established in nearby Henley, moved their cheese factory here, and was closed in the 1980s.

Momona is the location of Dunedin International Airport. With the establishment of the airport, an extra township was built for families of airport staff, its three streets being named after RNZAF airmen who received the Victoria Cross: James Allen Ward, Lloyd Trigg, and Leonard Henry Trent.

New Zealand's lowest point, at 2 metres (6.6 ft) below sea level, is located on Kirk's Drain Road just to the southwest of Momona. The road was named after John Kirk, a nearby resident, who was the grandfather of the Rt. Hon. Norman Kirk, Prime Minister of New Zealand from 1972 to 1974.

== Demographics ==
Momona statistical area, which also includes Outram and Allanton, covers 217.61 km^{2} (84.02 sq mi) and had an estimated population of 2,600 as of June 2025, with a population density of 11.9 people per km^{2}.

Historical population
Year	Pop.	±% p.a.
2006	2,130	—
2013	2,205	+0.50%
2018	2,322	+1.04%

The statistical area had a population of 2,322 at the 2018 New Zealand census, an increase of 117 people (5.3%) since the 2013 census, and an increase of 192 people (9.0%) since the 2006 census. There were 897 households, comprising 1,209 males and 1,113 females, giving a sex ratio of 1.09 males per female. The median age was 43.0 years (compared with 37.4 years nationally), with 498 people (21.4%) aged under 15 years, 330 (14.2%) aged 15 to 29, 1,161 (50.0%) aged 30 to 64, and 336 (14.5%) aged 65 or older.

Ethnicities were 96.3% European/Pākehā, 8.1% Māori, 0.1% Pasifika, 1.6% Asian, and 1.3% other ethnicities. People may identify with more than one ethnicity.

The percentage of people born overseas was 9.9, compared with 27.1% nationally.

Although some people chose not to answer the census's question about religious affiliation, 60.5% had no religion, 32.0% were Christian, 0.4% were Buddhist and 0.9% had other religions.

Of those at least 15 years old, 318 (17.4%) people had a bachelor's or higher degree, and 378 (20.7%) people had no formal qualifications. The median income was $38,000, compared with $31,800 nationally. 345 people (18.9%) earned over $70,000 compared to 17.2% nationally. The employment status of those at least 15 was that 1,050 (57.6%) people were employed full-time, 318 (17.4%) were part-time, and 39 (2.1%) were unemployed.
