= Romaero =

Romanian aerospace company

Romaero S.A.

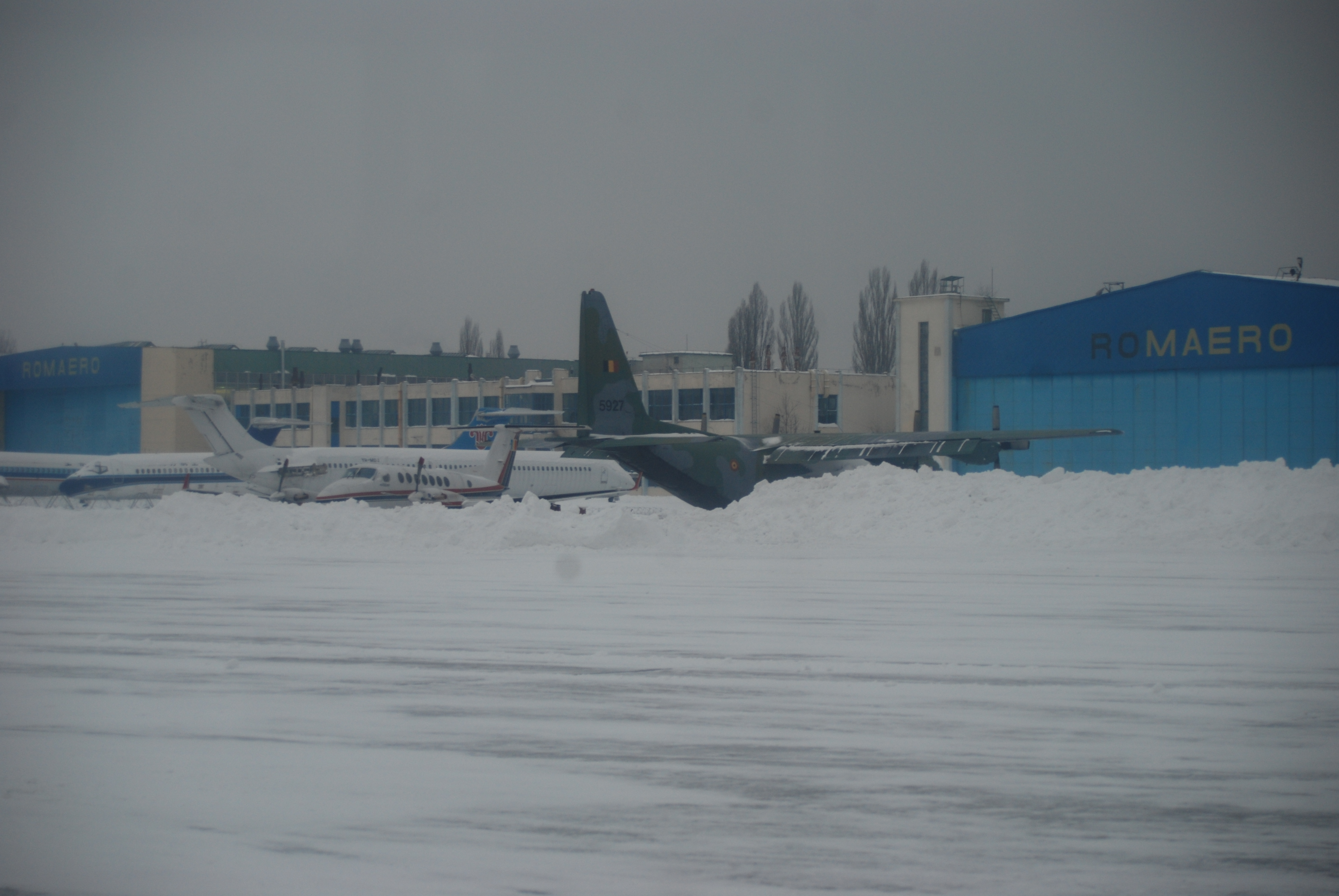
- Formerly: ASAM (1920–1944); IRMA (1944–1978); Întreprinderea de Avioane București (1978–1991)
- Company type: State-owned
- Industry: Aerospace
- Founded: 1920; 106 years ago
- Headquarters: Băneasa, Bucharest, Romania
- Website: romaero.com

Romaero, formerly Întreprinderea de Reparații Material Aeronautic or IRMA ('Enterprise for the Repair of Aeronautical Material'), is a Romanian aerospace company, headquartered in the Băneasa neighborhood of Bucharest. In recent years, it has largely concentrated on aircraft repairs as well as component manufacturing for overseas companies.

The company was founded by Royal Decree in 1920 under the name ASAM. It was rebranded as IRMA in 1944. In 1978, the company again changed its name to IAvB – Întreprinderea de Avioane București ('Bucharest Enterprise Aircraft'). Finally, it was rebranded as Romaero S.A. in 1991. Perhaps the largest manufacturing programme that the company has been involved in was mass production of the British-designed Britten-Norman Islander; over 500 airframes were reportedly completed in Romania. Another major independent undertaking of the firm was the Rombac 1-11 airliner, a license-produced model of the BAC One-Eleven produced in Romania; however, sales never reached expectations and the programme was abandoned during the late 1990s.

== History ==
=== Early years ===
Since the company's early years, particularly under the guise of IRMA, it has specialised in the overhaul of various types of aircraft. Specifically, it was involved in the repair and services of numerous Soviet aircraft, including the Li-2, IL-14, IL-18, Antonov An-2, An-24, An-26 and An-30. The company also produced a number of indigenously-developed aircraft, which were categorised as either light aircraft or agricultural aircraft: IAR-818, IAR-821, and IAR-822.

In 1968, IRMA secured an arrangement to manufacture the British Britten-Norman Islander, a popular twin-engined multipurpose aircraft. According to the company, IRMA was responsible for producing in excess of 500 Islanders, roughly half of those ever produced. While production of the type came to a close during the late 1990s it was reported that negotiations for Romaero to resume production of the Islander had reached an advanced stage by 2002. However, Britten-Norman subsequently decided to bring manufacturing inhouse.

=== ROMBAC One-Eleven ===
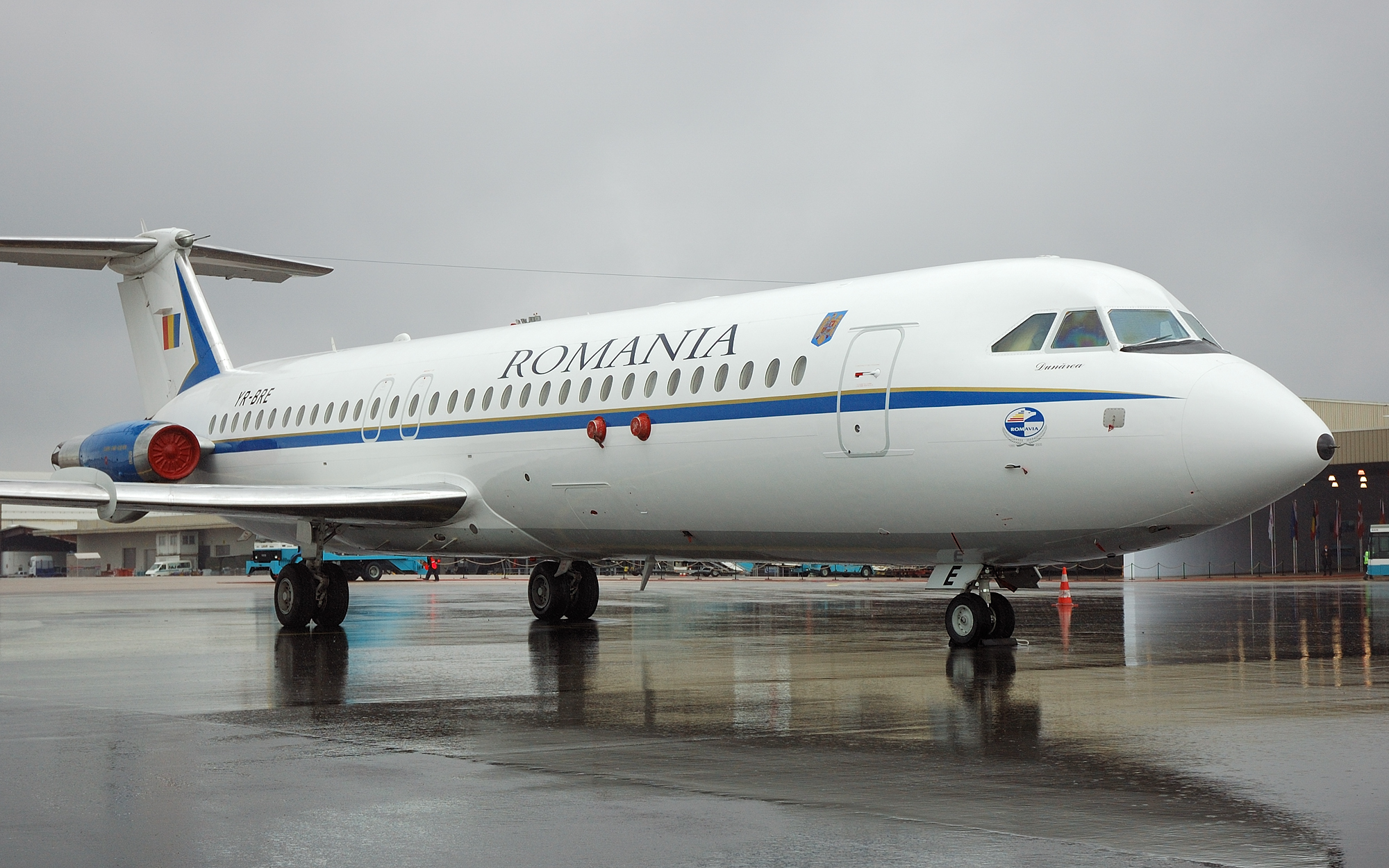
Romavia Rombac 1-11

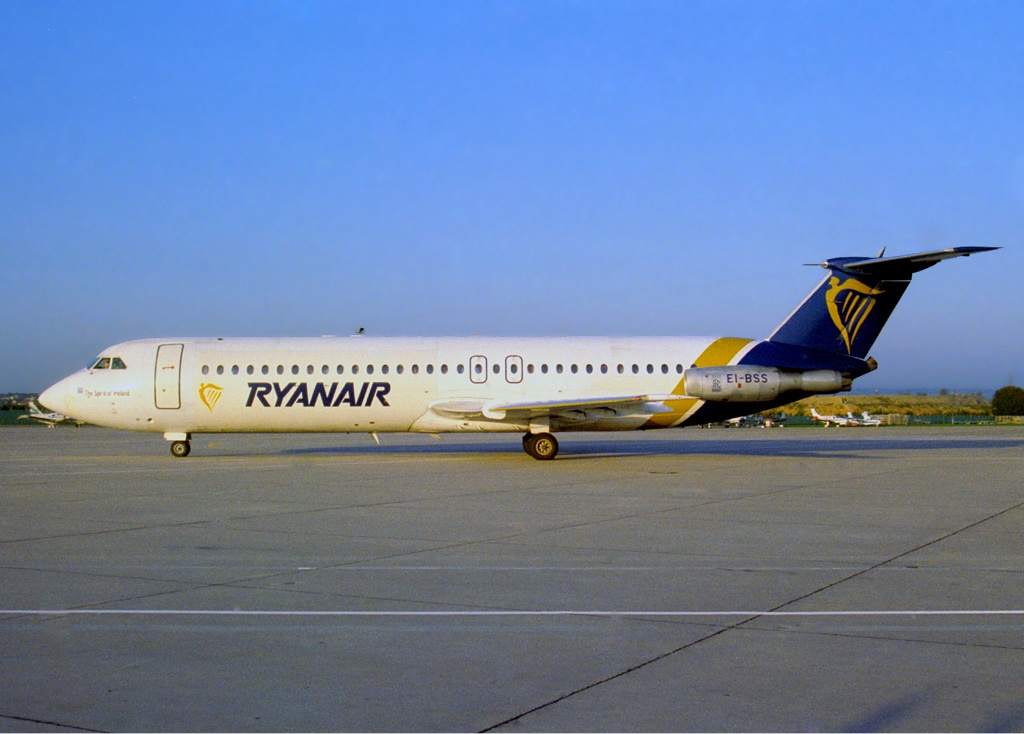
A Ryanair Rombac One-Eleven at Stuttgart Airport (1992)

On 9 June 1979, Romanian president Nicolae Ceaușescu signed an agreement with the British Aerospace for the licensed production of the BAC One-Eleven in Romania. This was to involve the delivery of three complete One-Elevens (two 500-series aircraft and one 475 series) plus the construction of at least 22 in Bucharest, with reducing British content. It also involved Romanian production of Spey engines and certification of the aircraft to British standards by the Civil Aviation Authority. A market for up to 80 Romanian-built airliners was projected, largely in China and other developing economies, as well as Eastern Europe. The aircraft was re-designated Rombac 1-11.

The first Rombac One-Eleven, (YR-BRA cn 401) a series 561RC, was rolled out at Romaero's Băneasa factory on 27 August 1982 and first flew on 18 September 1982. Production continued until 1989 at a much slower pace than had been previously foreseen. Nine aircraft were delivered, while the tenth and eleventh airliners on the production line being abandoned when they were 85% and 70% complete respectively. The first Rombac was delivered to TAROM on 29 December 1982. The Romanian carrier took delivery of all but two of the airliners produced, the remaining two going to Romavia, the last of which (YR-BRI cn 409) was delivered on 1 January 1993. Romania's economy and international position deteriorated to the point where supplies for One-Eleven manufacturing slowed to a trickle, with hard currency restrictions delaying overseas component deliveries; the market foreseen had largely lacked interest, though some Rombac airliners were leased to European operators. The One-Eleven's noise level and fuel economy failed to keep pace with American and West European competition.

Following the fall of the Ceaușescu regime, plans were made to restart production using the Rolls-Royce Tay. British aircraft leasing company Associated Aerospace agreed a $1 billion deal to purchase 50 Tay-powered One-Elevens fitted with a new electronic glass cockpit for onward leasing to Western customers; however, the liquidation of Associated Aerospace in April 1991 ended this deal. Efforts to sell the One-Eleven continued through the 1990s. In 1993, with US operator Kiwi International Air Lines placing a firm order for 11 Tay-engined aircraft with options for an additional five, but this plan fell through. In April 1997, Romaero announced was abandoning efforts to launch its envisioned revamp of the One-Eleven, which it referred to as the Airstar 2500.

=== Post-Cold War ===
During the 1990s, the company, recently rebranded as Romaero, became heavily engaged in the maintenance, repair and overhaul (MRO) sector, performing such work for numerous European operators across a large number of commercial aircraft. It also formed agreements with various international manufacturers as a subcontractor, undertaking subassembly and manufacturing work for companies such as Bombardier Aviation for the CL-415 flying boat as well as Boeing's 737 and 757 airliners. Romaero continued its long-term relationship with the Britten-Norman company as well.

In early 1999, it was announced that the company was to be acquired by Britten-Norman from the Romanian government in exchange for $80.5 million. At the time, Britten-Norman also announced plans to invest substantial sums in the firm's manufacturing facilities at Băneasa Airport, including in its design and MRO capabilities. However, the acquisition was later abandoned following a dispute over the deal's cost. During 2000, Romaero became the first aerospace company in Romania to receive JAR-145 approval from the Joint Aviation Authorities, enhancing its standing as a provider of MRO services.

Throughout the 2000s, Romaero continued to seek out participation in Western European aircraft manufacturing programs. In 2003, a deal with BAE Systems was announced for Romaero to build cargo conversion kits for the British Aerospace ATP short-haul airliner; the first example was completed during the following year. During 2006, a long-term agreement was signed with Saab AB and the firm concerning the manufacture of subassemblies and components; Saab referred to the deal as a strategic alliance. That same year, it was announced that Romaero would be performing manufacturing work on the ATR 42 and ATR 72 regional aircraft in favour of prior arrangements based in Naples; the transfer was viewed as only the first step towards work on further projects undertaken by Alenia Aeronautica, such as the Alenia C-27J Spartan.

In 2003, Romaero became the American Lockheed Martin aircraft factory service center for C-130 Hercules aircraft repairs. Following Romania's purchase of Patriot missile systems, a memorandum was signed in 2019 between Raytheon and Romaero for the production of component parts and mechanical subassemblies for the system. Currently, Romaero produces components for the AN/MPQ-65 radar.

Due to financial problems and various other reasons, Romaero was forced to file for insolvency in January 2024. In June of the same year, the debt accumulated by the state-owned company was transferred to the State Assets Administration Authority (AAAS) with the goal of attracting new investors. As part of the restructuring plan of the company, Romaero signed a Memorandum of Understanding with the Polish company WZL-2 from Bydgoszcz for the maintenance of the new C-130 aircraft received by the Romanian Air Force. A further collaboration with Aeroplex Central Europe from Hungary was started for the maintenance and repair of civil aircraft.

== See also ==
- Arsenalul Aeronautic
- IAR
- Aviation in Romania
