= Kiwi Travel International Airlines =

IATA	ICAO	Call sign
KC	KIC	-
- Commenced operations: July 1994 (charter services), 23 August 1995 (scheduled services)
- Ceased operations: 27 August 1995 (charter services), 9 September 1996 (scheduled services)
- Hubs: Hamilton
- Fleet size: 2 (1996)
- Destinations: 10 (1996)
- Key people: Ewan Wilson (CEO)

Kiwi Travel International Airlines was a New Zealand–based airline which pioneered discount flights between secondary airports in Australia and New Zealand in the mid-1990s. The airline was established by Ewan Wilson and several associates. Wilson was CEO and was later convicted on four counts of fraud.

== Charter services ==
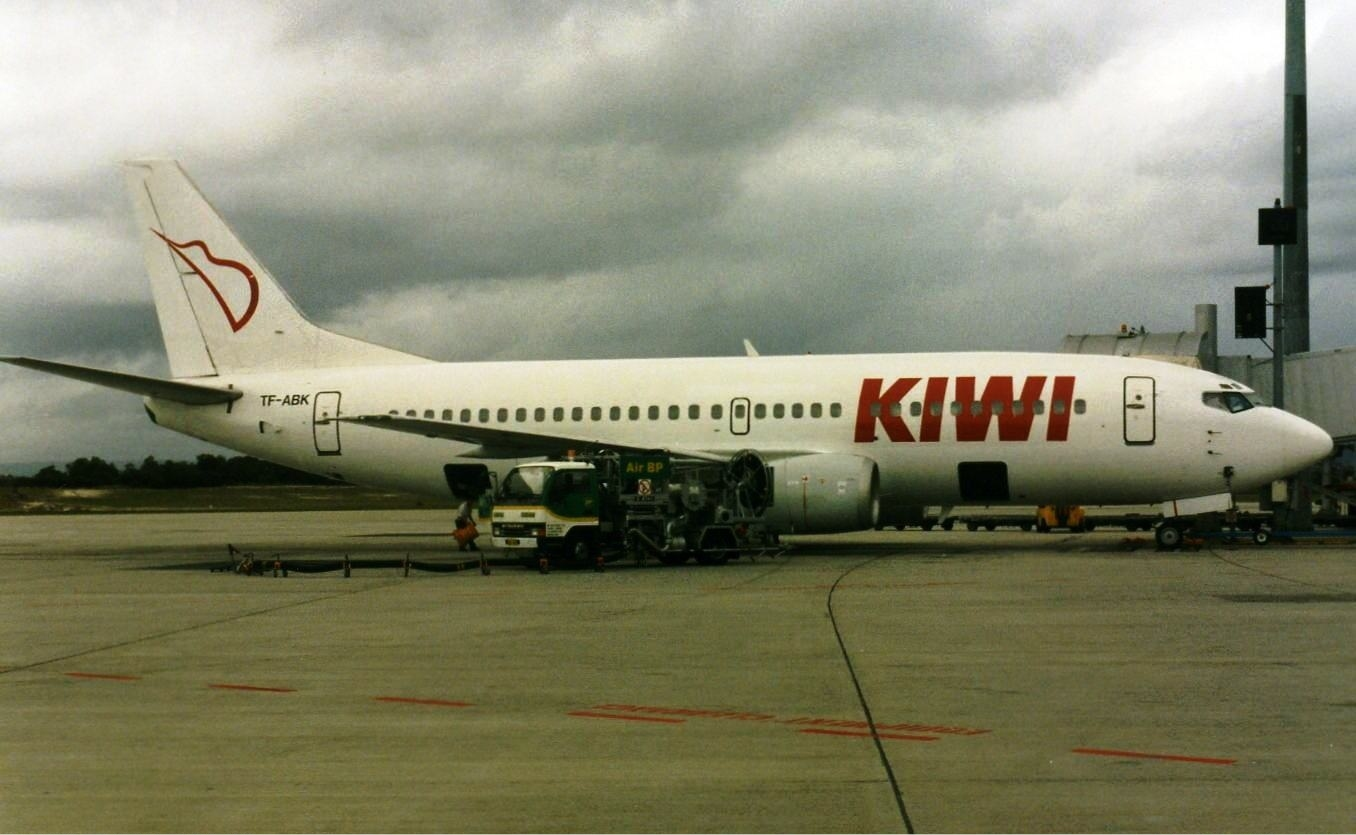
Kiwi Boeing 737-300 at Perth Airport

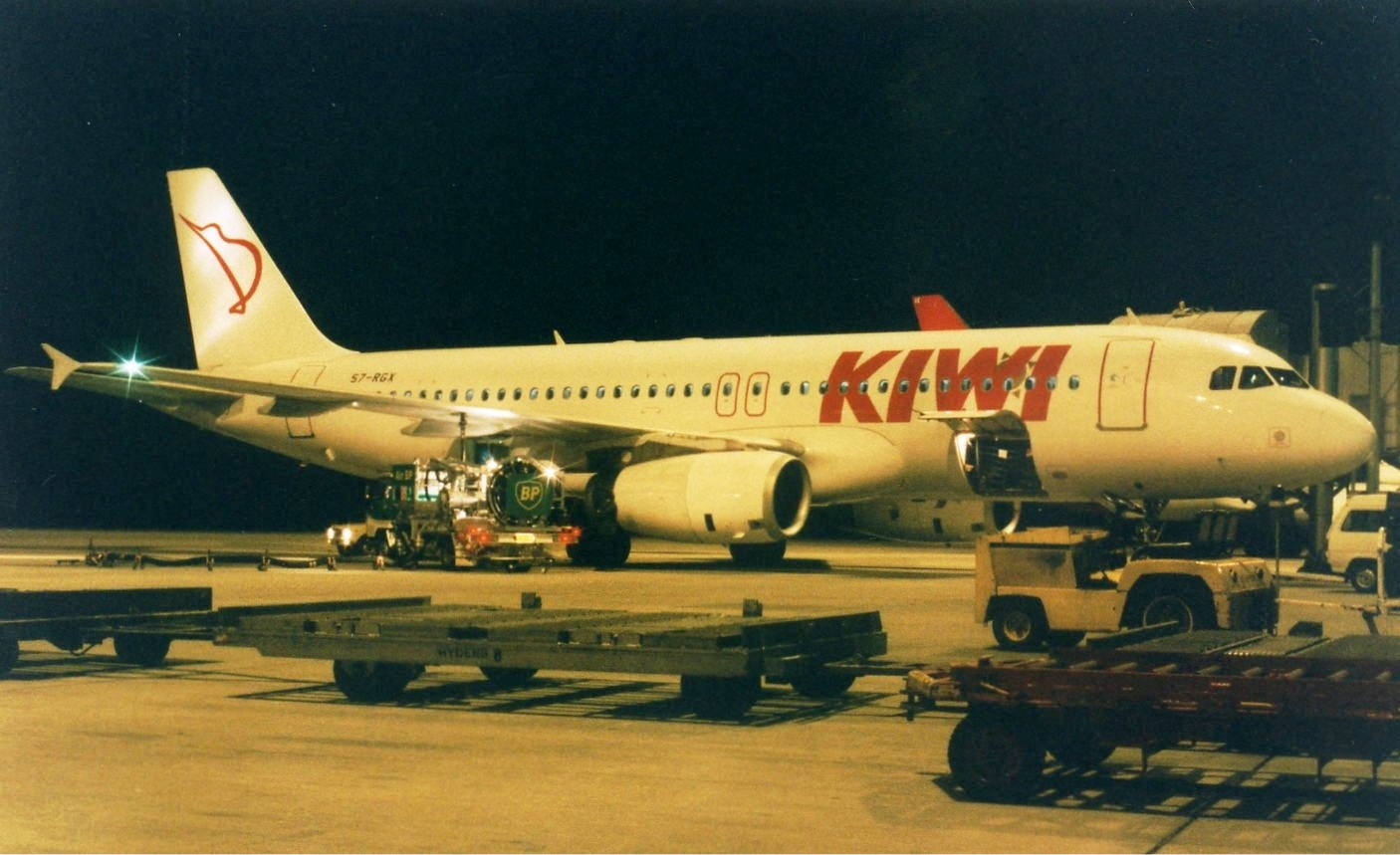
Kiwi Airbus A320 at Perth Airport

The airline began as Kiwi Travel Air Charters in July 1994, operating weekly charters between Hamilton, New Zealand and Brisbane, Australia, using a leased Air Nauru Boeing 737-400. In December 1994, charters were operated to Brisbane, Tonga and Western Samoa. The network was expanded in April 1995 to include Queensland coastal cities, including the Gold Coast, Cairns, Townsville and Rockhampton. The last charter flight was operated on 27 August 1995, following the commencement of scheduled services.

== Scheduled flights ==
Following the issue of the necessary government permits, Kiwi Travel International Airlines commenced scheduled flights between Hamilton and Sydney using a leased Boeing 727-200 on 23 August 1995. The 727 was operated on behalf of Kiwi by AvAtlantic of the United States, who also held the air operator's certificate on behalf of the airline. Flights were operated from the New Zealand cities of Hamilton and Dunedin. Due to the short runways at these airports, the aircraft could only take on limited fuel due to weight restrictions and needed to land in Auckland and Christchurch respectively to take on more fuel before making the trans-Tasman crossing. The airline offered full economy services as well as no frills "Peanuts and Cola"-class fares.

== Competition, route expansion and fleet changes ==
By the end of 1995, Air New Zealand had established Freedom Air via its subsidiary Mount Cook Airline and operated in direct competition with Kiwi, offering the same routes and a similar fare structure. In early 1996, Kiwi replaced its Boeing 727 with a leased Boeing 757 from the United Kingdom based company Air 2000, later replaced by a Boeing 737. Freedom Air also operated a Boeing 737. Kiwi added a second aircraft, an Airbus A320, and expanded its network to include Christchurch and the Australian cities of Melbourne and Perth. By September 1996, trans-Tasman fares reached historic lows of $199 for return tickets between Melbourne/Christchurch and Melbourne/Hamilton.

== Financial troubles and liquidation ==
Following intense competition with Freedom Air and a series of financial difficulties, Kiwi Travel International Airlines went into voluntary liquidation on 9 September 1996. Passengers on both sides of the Tasman Sea were stranded. In Brisbane, the company's Boeing 737 and Airbus A320 were taken by Airservices Australia in lieu of unpaid aviation fees. They were eventually returned to their owners.

Ewan Wilson was CEO and was later convicted on four counts of fraud. Wilson was later involved in Kiwi Regional Airlines.
