= Kiwi International Air Lines =

American airline

IATA	ICAO	Call sign
KP	KIA	KIWI
- Commenced operations: September 21, 1992
- Ceased operations: March 24, 1999
- Hubs: Newark
- Secondary hubs: Atlanta; Chicago–Midway
- Fleet size: 15 at Peak; 4 (March 1999)
- Destinations: 6 (March 1999)
- Headquarters: Hemisphere Center, Newark, New Jersey, U.S.
- Key people: Robert Iverson (President 1992-1995), Jerry Murphy (President 1995-1998), Charles C. Edwards (Owner, 1997-1999)
- Employees: 1500 at peak

Kiwi International Air Lines was a Part 121 American airline that operated from September 21, 1992 to March 24, 1999. It had its headquarters in the Hemisphere Center in Newark, New Jersey adjacent to Newark International Airport, now Newark Liberty International Airport.

Kiwi International Air Lines was founded by a group of Eastern Air Lines pilots in a plan to re-employ former Eastern pilots, flight attendants, managers, and other contract and non-contract employees who had lost their jobs when Eastern Air Lines went into bankruptcy in 1989. The former airline pilots originally formed a group and called themselves Kiwis because they were no longer flying, just like the flightless Kiwi birds. The airline operated a fleet of Boeing 727-200 and McDonnell Douglas DC-9 aircraft. In its brief history, the airline flew 8 million passengers without incident.

== History ==
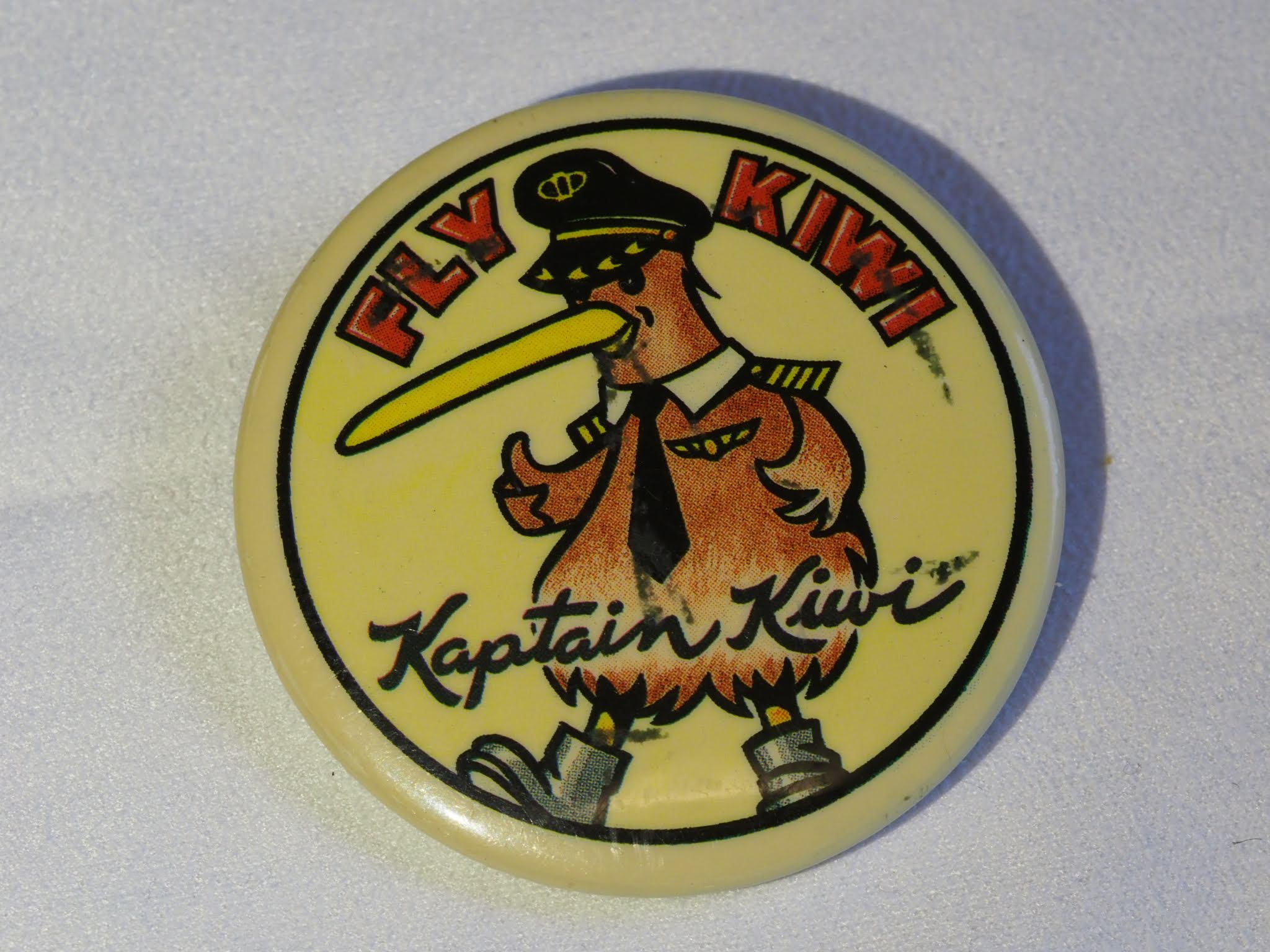
Promotional button for Kiwi International Airlines, circa 1994. Diameter 54mm.

Originally, the intent of the Kiwi Founders (known as the Kiwi Acquisition Group) was to purchase the Pan Am Shuttle (which flew exclusively between New York LaGuardia, Boston Logan, and Washington National) out of the Pan Am bankruptcy. The group presented a Kelso and Company-backed $100 million offer to Pan Am for the Shuttle. Its offer was rejected in favor of Delta Air Lines offer for Pan Am including its shuttle operation. With advice from the United States Department of Transportation and the Federal Aviation Administration, the Kiwi Acquisition Group decided to start a new airline from scratch rather than buy a failing carrier. To do this, the Kiwi Acquisition Group raised approximately $2 million from a group of 40 out-of-work, primarily Newark-based Eastern Air Lines pilots. Each pilot invested $50,000 with a promise of employment as a captain in any new airline the Kiwi Acquisition Group was able to certify - preferably based out of Newark International Airport. When it came time to name the new airline, the Kiwi Acquisition Group decided to keep Kiwi in the name of their new airline.

Kiwi flew its first revenue flights on September 21, 1992, using two refurbished Boeing 727-200s from Lufthansa on routes between Newark and Atlanta, Chicago and Orlando. Kiwi offered gourmet meals and expanded legroom with a 36-inch pitch in their airplanes. At start-up, ownership of KIWI was divided among Kiwi's founders and certain of its employees. According to the DOT (Docket #48056 July 1992) at Start-Up, Founders and brothers Dr. Codie Bell and David Bell owned approximately 47% of the airline's stock. The remainder of Kiwi's stock was spread among a number of other individuals.

In his 2005 book Competition Demystified: A Radically Simplified Approach to Business Strategy Columbia Professor Bruce Greenwald described Kiwi's initial winning operating strategy as:

1. Not to get so big as to directly antagonize established carriers. Kiwi started with 3 routes from Newark International Airport to 3 different hubs with different incumbent competitors. The amount of traffic Kiwi planned was unthreatening enough that it would cost the airline's incumbents more to eliminate Kiwi than to let it survive. Kiwi's east-west Newark-to-Chicago route (Kiwi flew into Midway Airport in Chicago and did not challenge United at its O’Hare hub) incurred minimally into United's and also American's business out of O'Hare. Kiwi's Newark to Atlanta route (into Hartsfield) again put minimal pressure on Delta. Kiwi's north–south routes to Florida from Newark were also designed to cherry pick a small portion of the leisure business from Delta and Continental.
2. Avoid challenging the established carriers on price. Kiwi pegged its ticket prices to the lowest restricted fare the competition was already offering. Where it challenged its competitor was by providing somewhat enhanced service.
3. Avoid poaching pilots, flight attendants, or other personnel from established carriers. A large part of its reason for being was to put Eastern employees back to work in an industry they loved and in a company they believed in. So Kiwi did not encroach on its competitors' employee bases.

The early Kiwi niche strategy was to focus its business on a single main hub (Newark – with access to the large NY-NJ metropolitan flying public), a simple route structure, an identifiable target business and large leisure markets. Being in the NY-NJ media capital of the world gave cash-poor Kiwi a distinct benefit – tremendous amounts of free national and local TV and radio coverage in its target markets which the airline made good use of.

Early on the airline secured a passenger sharing agreement from Richard Branson to feed between Kiwi and Virgin Atlantic flights. Branson helped out by promoting Kiwi and calling it his "favorite" U.S. airline. Kiwi did its share and enjoyed a flawless safety record and a near perfect dispatch reliability rate of 99.6%, as it expanded.

In 1993, Chairman Iverson committed Kiwi to placing an order for 11 BAC One-Eleven aircraft with five options. This involved selling a 14 percent stake in KIWI to a Romanian company (Romaero S. A.). Kiwi, which had only five 727-200 long haul jets at the time, reported that the BAC One-Eleven planes would be made by Romaero S.A. under a license from British Aerospace P.L.C. Kiwi committed to spending $20 million for each aircraft, which were primarily a short-haul jet. Under Chairman Iverson, Kiwi ordered 6 jets with 90 seats which were to be equipped with modern Rolls-Royce Tay engines. Kiwi had options to buy another five jets. The British-designed aircraft were to be built in Romania. However, Romaero failed to find any funding to develop and manufacture the aircraft. Kiwi ultimately scrapped the ill-conceived plan, but not before Romaero had invested approximately $1 million in Kiwi and received one seat on the Kiwi Board of Directors.

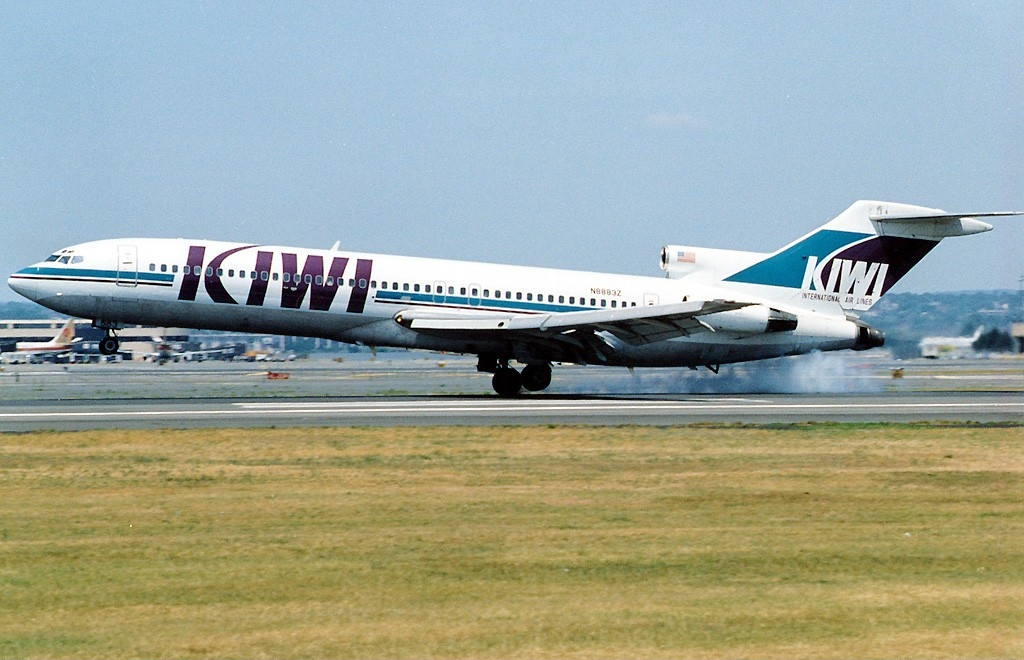
A Kiwi Boeing 727-200 landing at Newark International Airport in 1994

During 1994, Kiwi's employee investors organized against Kiwi's Chairman/CEO/President Robert Iverson's mismanagement of the air line. Iverson's employee owners (especially the majority shareholding pilots) were very concerned about the December FAA grounding of the entire KIWI fleet over pilot training irregularities which reportedly cost the air line over $2 million in losses. Iverson later instituted a drastic pay reduction for all employees in January 1995. By February 1995, the Kiwi Board of Directors (which was controlled by a Voting Trust of Kiwi's employee shareholders) had learned of Kiwi's precarious financial condition and forced removal of Iverson. Inc. Magazine reported that Kiwi under Iverson's management accumulated operating losses of nearly $40 million in less than two and a half years of flying. This turned his employee investors (who had invested their life savings in the airline) and his own outside KIWI Board of Directors against him.

Iverson, for his part blamed his own employees and shareholders for the failure of the airline. "One of the stupidest things I ever did was call everybody owners," Iverson told The New York Times in an interview. According to Inc., Iverson alleged Kiwi's employee shareholders (who owned a controlling interest in the airline) were "insubordinate and meddling", "decision making was belabored", "financial discipline impossible", and "(his) efforts were subverted". Former KIWI Chairman John Anderson told Inc., "We didn't have a leader in Bob Iverson."

Inc. reporter Anne Murphy wrote that Iverson could easily be criticized for poor business judgment. Iverson selected many of Kiwi's top management from cronies of his who were fellow pilot investors who had no practical management experience. Iverson himself had previously been an Eastern Air Lines pilot. Inc. reported at the time: "The CEO (Iverson) himself had never managed so much as a baggage carousel". As a result of his lack of business experience, Iverson expanded his management team to an unwieldy 11 vice-presidents. They were hand-picked by Iverson his fellow pilot investors. All reported directly to him. Iverson candidly admitted later, when interviewed for the Inc. article "Taking the Fall", "(I) ran the company like a little pilots' union or a flying club, not like a business." Bruce Greenwald in Competition Demystified concluded that Iverson's "quest for growth at all costs led it (Kiwi) to abandon a strategy that seemed to be working...".

After being fired by Kiwi, Iverson subsequently started another air carrier which focused on charter flying operations, rather than scheduled service like Kiwi had. According to the DOT/Bureau of Transportation Statistics, Air Carrier Financials: Schedule P-1.1's filed by Sky Trek, this new venture promptly lost nearly $8 million in less than 2 years. At this point, Iverson was forced out of Sky Trek which filed for bankruptcy shortly thereafter.

After his removal from Kiwi, the Kiwi Board of Directors was reconstituted and attempted to hire more professional (non-pilot) management. Jerry Murphy (formerly of MGM Grand Air and Pan Am) was eventually hired as the president and CEO of Kiwi in June 1995. Murphy served in that capacity until November 1998. At the time Murphy was brought on board, former Kiwi Chairman John Anderson explained: "He (Iverson) never showed himself capable of running this airline profitably.". According to the Inc. reporter Anne Murphy, another insider told her, "He (Iverson) had a tendency to throw gasoline on fires," The new CEO Jerry Murphy lamented to the press that Iverson created "make-work" positions that overstaffed the airline which raised its costs per seat mile which made profitability impossible.

Later in 1996 under Murphy's reorganization, Kiwi appeared to get a lifeline when it announced it had secured a $20 million financing package from Recovery Equity Partners, a California based private equity fund through the efforts of Conexus. However, at the time Kiwi received the first tranche of the financing package, the ValuJet and Trans World Airlines accidents in May and July 1996 occurred. Following these unrelated accidents, the FAA increased its surveillance of the airline industry. But, more specifically, the FAA targeted the smaller carriers in the industry, like Kiwi. Because of alleged maintenance documentation issues found during this period by the FAA, Kiwi was directed by the FAA to temporarily ground 25% of its fleet.

Subsequently, Kiwi, which was once called "one of the best of the recent start-up lines" by Consumer Reports Travel Letter, filed for bankruptcy on September 30, 1996, and after failing to find additional financing, stopped scheduled service on October 15, 1996. After several fits and starts, in July 1997, a Federal bankruptcy judge in Newark agreed to liquidate Kiwi in a $16.5 million deal for Kiwi's assets with Joe Logan (Aviation Holdings) and Dr. Charles C. Edwards (an orthopedic surgeon and entrepreneur from Maryland) who had led 30=plus business enterprises over his 33-year career. The deal included a Huntington Station, New York investment firm called NJS Acquisitions, which invested $3.5 million for its 20% stake. In its first five months under Edwards' hands-on leadership, Kiwi ended service from Atlanta to Palm Beach and Orlando, and added service from Newark to Boston and Tampa, from Boston to West Palm Beach, from Chicago to Tampa, from Atlanta to Tampa, and (on a seasonal basis) from Orlando to San Juan, Puerto Rico.

By the end of 1998, the "new" Kiwi had an operating loss of $19.8 million. By February 19, 1999, Kiwi owed more than $750,000 to the airports it served. Subsequently, on March 23, the United States Department of Transportation (USDOT) announced plans to revoke Kiwi's operating certificate for failing to meet federal fitness standards for air carriers. Kiwi was also the subject of two separate USDOT investigations - one concerning the airline's financial and managerial fitness and another concerning its safety. At the time, Kiwi was on the verge of receiving a $3 million bailout from the reconstituted Pan Am (to address the USDOT concerns about its financial and managerial situation). But the termination of Kiwi's operating certificate for safety reasons meant it would be months before the airline could fly again if ever.

In March 1999, Kiwi tried becoming a simple charter carrier with four leased jets flying to six cities, 500 employees and 11 months of paid advance reservations for about 80,000 seats. However, by December 1999, the Federal bankruptcy judge in Newark approved the total liquidation of the airline.

Ed Perkins, editor of TheTravel Letter, noted that other members of the travel press blamed the Kiwi bankruptcy on chronic undercapitalization, problems with the FAA, and the "media's indiscriminate innuendos about the safety of all low-fare airlines following the Valujet crash". Perkins suggested a fourth problem for Kiwi: the "pervasive power of the giant lines' frequent-flyer programs," noting that Kiwi had deliberately targeted business travelers on some of its routes. Perkins pointed out that Kiwi's major competitors' approach was to match Kiwi's fares. But, Kiwi's competitors matched prices only around the times of the more limited Kiwi flight schedules. Basically, Kiwi's competitors bracketed the Kiwi flights with similar competitive pricing; for the rest of their schedules, Kiwi's major airline competitors returned their prices to levels they could make a profit at. And, more importantly, in its business markets, the major carriers were able to compete with Kiwi by using their frequent-flyer miles (worth about $12–15 per one-way trip) as loss leaders. This resulted in a loss of customers for Kiwi, particularly its business customers, even though it belatedly established its own Frequent Flyer program.

== Destinations ==
^{[Hub]}	Hub
^{[T]}	Terminated destination

City	Country	IATA	ICAO	Airport	Refs
Aguadilla	United States	BQN	TJBQ	Rafael Hernández International Airport	
Aruba	Netherlands	AUA	TNCA	Queen Beatrix International Airport	
Atlanta	United States	ATL	KATL	Hartsfield-Jackson Atlanta International Airport	
Bermuda	Bermuda	BDA	TXKF	L.F. Wade International Airport	
Boston	United States	BOS	KBOS	General Edward Lawrence Logan International Airport	
Chicago	United States	MDW	KMDW	Chicago Midway International Airport	
Las Vegas	United States	LAS	KLAS	Las Vegas McCarran International Airport	
Miami	United States	MIA	KMIA	Miami International Airport	
Newark	United States	EWR	KEWR	Newark Liberty International Airport	
Orlando	United States	MCO	KMCO	Orlando International Airport	
San Juan	United States	SJU	TJSJ	Luis Muñoz Marín International Airport	
St. Maarten	Sint Maarten	SXM	TNCM	Princess Juliana International Airport	
Tampa	United States	TPA	KTPA	Tampa International Airport	
West Palm Beach	United States	PBI	KPBI	Palm Beach International Airport	

According to its spring/summer 1998 route map, the airline also served Niagara Falls, New York via the Niagara Falls International Airport. This same route map depicts nonstop routes flown the Kiwi hub located at Newark Liberty International Airport to Aguadilla, Atlanta, Chicago Midway, Orlando and West Palm Beach.

== See also ==
- List of defunct airlines of the United States
