= Dunedin Airport =

Dunedin Airport Taunga Rererangi o Ōtepoti

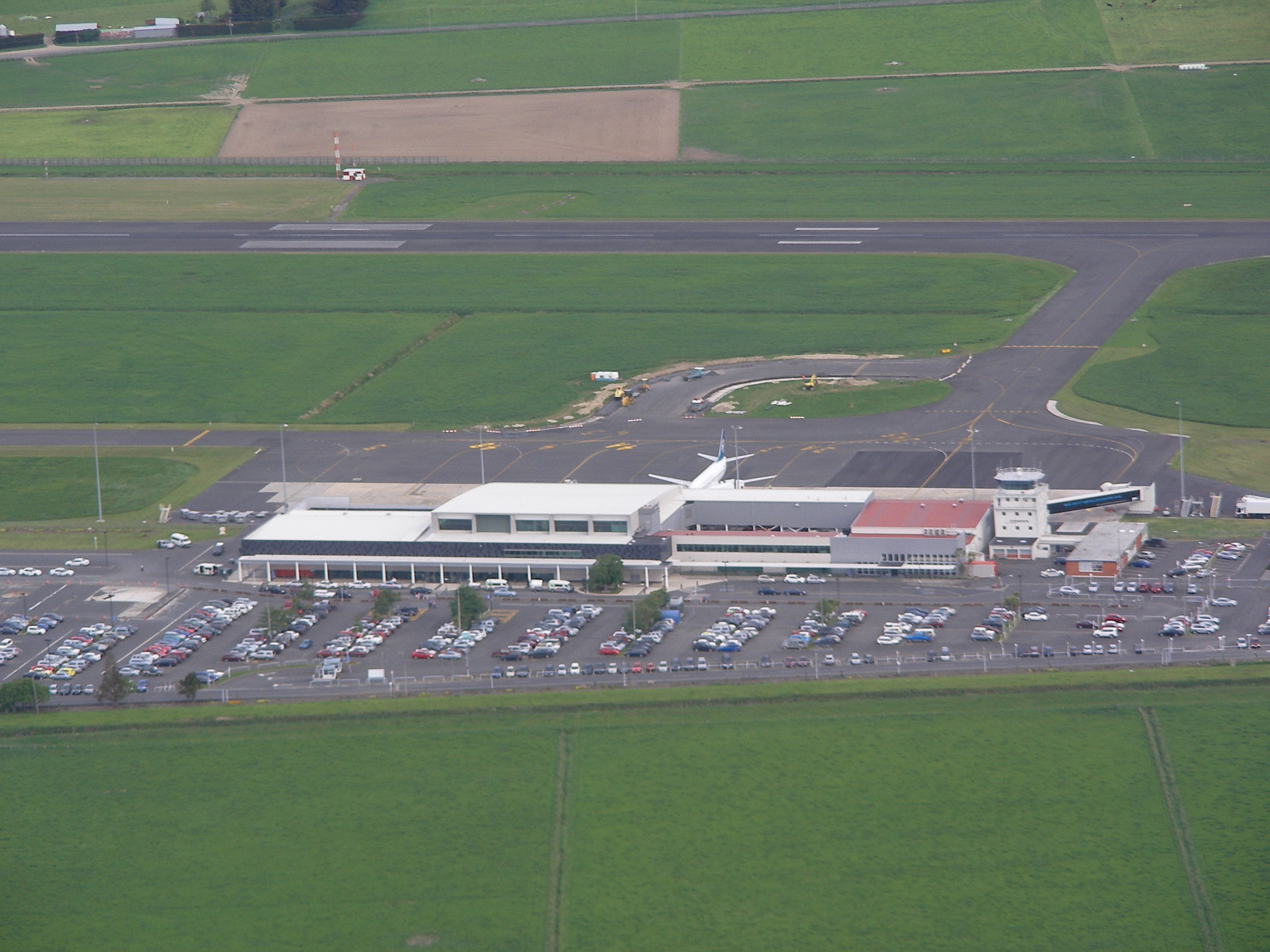
- IATA: DUD; ICAO: NZDN

Summary
- Airport type: Public
- Owner: Dunedin City Council and the New Zealand Government (The Crown)
- Operator: Dunedin International Airport Limited
- Serves: Dunedin
- Location: Momona, Dunedin, New Zealand
- Built: 1962
- Time zone: NZST (UTC+12:00)
  - Summer (DST): NZDT (UTC+13:00)
- Elevation AMSL: 1.2 m / 4 ft
- Coordinates: 45°55′41″S 170°11′54″E
- Website: www.dunedinairport.co.nz

Map
- Location of Dunedin Airport in New Zealand

Runways
Direction	Length		Surface
Direction	m	ft	Surface
03/21	1,900	6,234	Asphalt

Statistics
- Passenger throughput (2024): 903,396
- Aircraft movements (2018): 29,229

Dunedin Airport (IATA: DUD, ICAO: NZDN), officially Dunedin International Airport, also known as Momona Airport, is an international airport in the Otago region of the South Island of New Zealand, serving Dunedin city and the Otago and Southland regions. Dunedin Airport is one of two international airports in Otago, the other being Queenstown International Airport. It is located adjacent to the village of Momona on the Taieri Plains approximately 22 kilometres south west of Dunedin CBD. It is the fifth busiest airport in New Zealand by passengers.

It has a single paved runway rated for aircraft up to the Boeing 767, with ILS in both directions. It has one terminal building with five gates, two with airbridges; and also customs facilities and other amenities. Mainland Air, a flight school and charter service, operates from a hangar next to the terminal building. The Dunedin City Council and the Crown each own 50 percent of Dunedin International Airport Limited, a publicly unlisted company which operates the utility.

== History ==
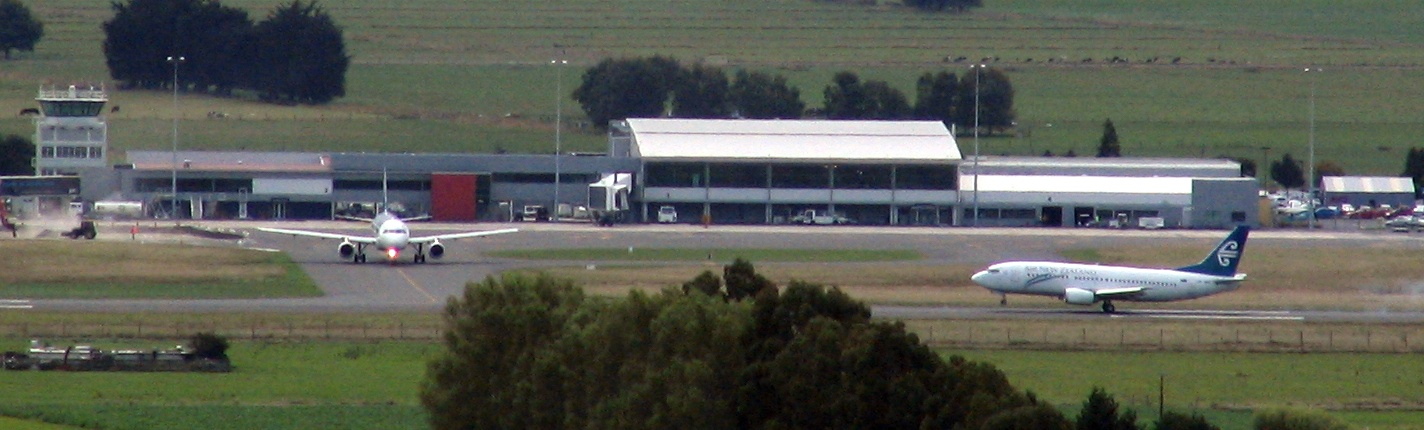
Air New Zealand Boeing 737-300 touching down on Runway 21, while an Air New Zealand Airbus A320-200 waits on the taxiway.

The old Taieri airfield was not economic to expand to cater for the growth in air travel expected in the future. Construction of the present airport was completed in 1962, and its primary use was to cater for passengers of short haul aircraft. NZNAC started Fokker Friendship services immediately upon opening with Vickers Viscount services starting in December 1962. A large new hangar was completed in 1963. Mount Cook Airlines operated to Dunedin from March 1966 to July 1991. NAC started Boeing 737 services to Dunedin in December 1968. Automatic sliding doors were provided in the terminal in 1969 with a Rothmans clock being installed in the terminal in 1971 and the toilets being expanded that same year. A new mezzanine floor and aircraft viewing deck were installed in 1974. The airport was the scene of a hostage crisis on 19 December 1979 when two borstal escapees held a police officer in the control tower.

The airport was closed due to flooding from June to July 1980. Ansett New Zealand began Boeing 737 (later replaced by BAe 146 aircraft) in December 1988 with airline lounges and airbridges being added in 1988. Extension of the runway to 1,900 metres (6,200 ft) was completed in May 1993. The first international flight, a Qantas Boeing 737-300 touched down in Dunedin in July 1994. Kiwi Travel International Airlines started regular transtasman flights in August 1995 followed by Freedom Air in December of the same year. Mount Cook Airlines began ATR-72 services to Dunedin in November 1995. Kiwi Air collapsed in September 1996. Ansett New Zealand became Qantas New Zealand in September 2000 and collapsed in April 2001, leaving Origin Pacific to step in for a time. In about 2005, the check-in space was enlarged and a new international arrival area was added. In 2002 Freedom Air started international services from Dunedin to Brisbane, Sydney and a seasonal route to Melbourne. The present terminal building was opened in October 2005. Freedom Air was absorbed into Air New Zealand at the end of March 2008. Virgin Australia began flying to Dunedin in July 2008, followed by Jetstar in July 2011. This airport is the third busiest and largest in the South Island of New Zealand, after Christchurch International Airport and Queenstown Airport.

Air New Zealand used to fly to Brisbane, Melbourne and Sydney until it divested responsibility to Virgin in 2010. Virgin Australia started seasonal services to Sydney and Melbourne in 2011 but ceased its flights to Melbourne and Sydney in 2014, and then the last flight from Brisbane arrived on the 22nd March 2020 as flight VA123, the service operated on Tuesdays, Thursdays and Sundays, the service ended due to COVID-19 and Virgin Australia entering voluntary administration.

The airport's name was changed from Dunedin International Airport to Dunedin Airport in 2015.

In October 2024, Dunedin Airport attracted domestic and international media attention after instituting a three-minute drop-off zone rule to improve safety and maintain the flow of traffic at its drop-off zone.

On 24 June 2025, Dunedin Airport received its first international flight since the start of the COVID-19 pandemic in New Zealand in 2020. This was a Jetstar Airways flight from Gold Coast Airport in Coolangatta, Queensland.

== Infrastructure and services ==
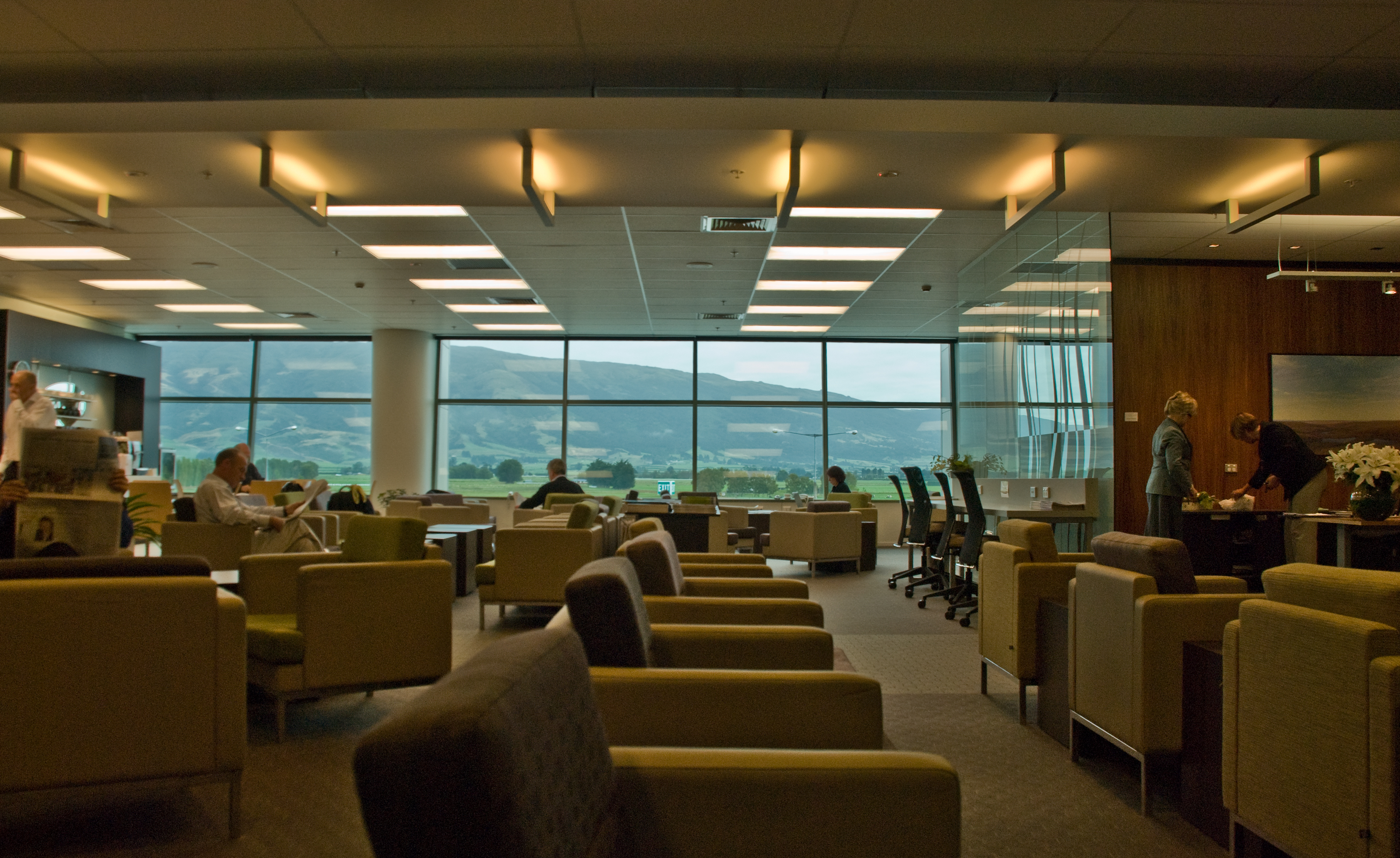
Air New Zealand Koru Club in Dunedin

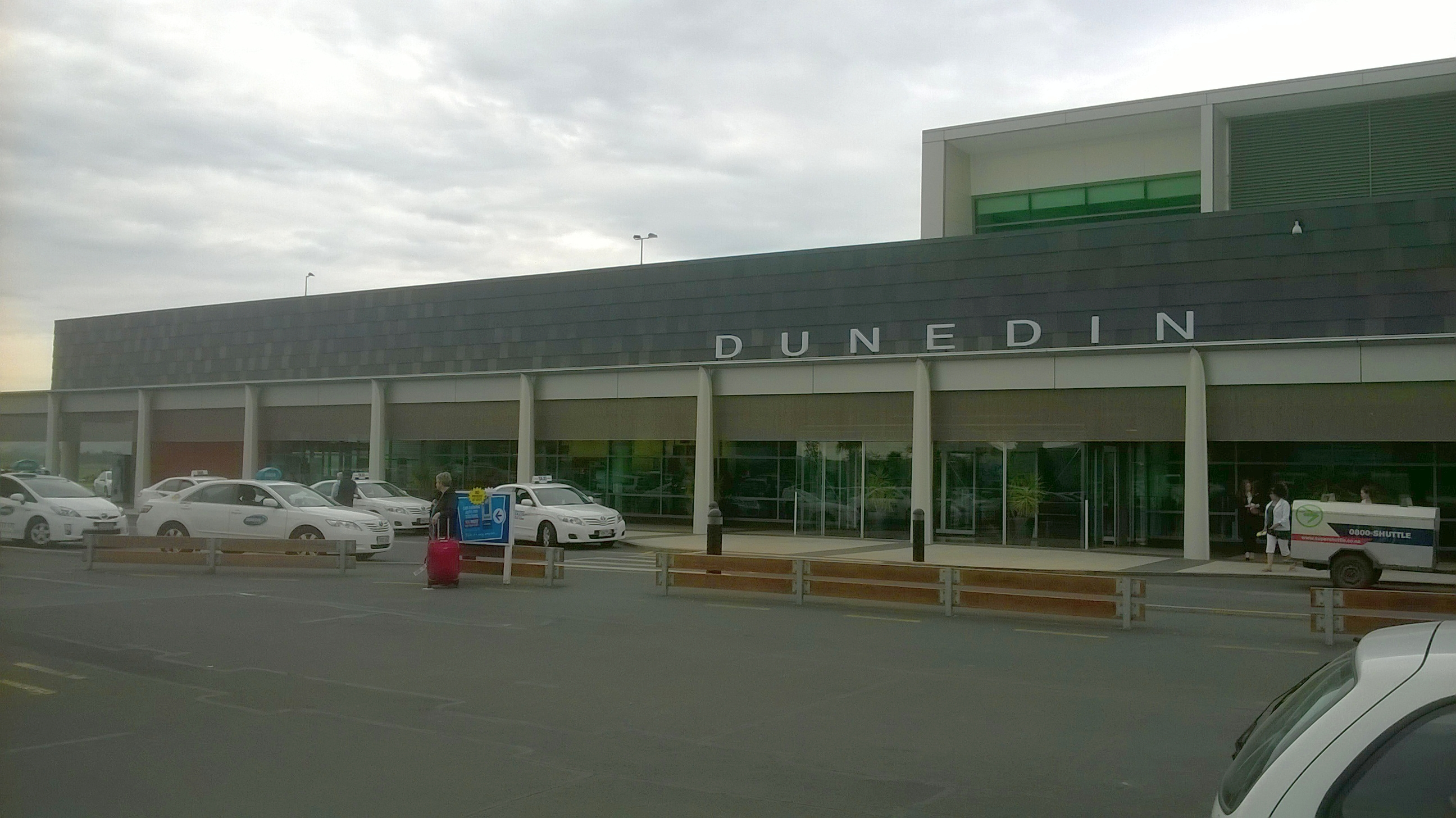
Dunedin Airport terminal building in 2014

=== Traffic and statistics ===
In 1963, a total of 100,000 passengers passed through the airport. It received its first international flight in 1994, and in 1995, there was a total of 520,000 passengers. This figure declined to 481,000 in 2000 with a total of 19,000 aircraft movements. It was predicted that by 2015 aircraft movements would exceed 38,000 with a projected 1,000,000 passengers. For the 2009 financial year passengers numbered 770,206. In 2018, the airport announced that passenger numbers had reached 1,035,645 per year.

=== Runway ===
In 2009, Dunedin International Airport Limited announced it had the land and consent to extend the runway from 1,900 m (6,200 ft) to 2,400 m (7,900 ft), at a cost of NZ$20 million. The extension would accommodate larger aircraft, on longer haul routes from as far afield as the United States and Southeast Asia. It also stressed that this extension would take place when needed and not simply as a project just for the sake of a longer runway.

=== Housing ===
Dunedin International Airport Limited owns Momona Village, a small housing community adjacent to the airport.

== Airlines and destinations ==
Airlines	Destinations
Air New Zealand	Auckland, Christchurch, Wellington
Jetstar	Auckland, Gold Coast

Mainland Air is based at the airport, and operates scenic, charter and ambulance flights. Mainland Aviation College, a division of Mainland Air, operates a flight training school.

== Statistics ==
=== 2014 ===
Busiest international routes into and out of Dunedin Airport (2014)
Rank	Airport	Passengers	% Change
1	Brisbane^{1}	50,937	▼4.3
2	Melbourne^{1}	2,444	▼40.4
3	Sydney^{1}	2,430	▼44.7

- ^1 This route is no longer operated as of March 2020.

=== 2016 ===
Busiest international routes into and out of Dunedin Airport (2016)
Rank	Airport	Passengers	% Change
1	Brisbane	45,705	▼13.1

=== 2019 ===
Busiest international routes into and out of Dunedin Airport (2019)
Rank	Airport	Passengers	% Change
1	Brisbane	44,942	▲6.2

=== 2025 ===
Busiest international routes into and out of Dunedin Airport (2025)
Rank	Airport	Passengers	% Change
1	Gold Coast^{1}	24,643	▲ New Route

== See also ==
- List of the busiest airports in New Zealand
- List of airports in New Zealand
- List of airlines of New Zealand
- Transport in New Zealand
