= List of radio stations in Auckland =

This is a list of radio stations in the Auckland region of New Zealand.

== FM stations ==
There are 28 FM radio broadcast stations in Auckland, broadcasting on 38 frequencies. MediaWorks Radio and NZME Radio are the largest FM broadcasting networks, with 9 stations on 13 frequencies and 7 stations respectively. Radio New Zealand and Chinese Voice each broadcast two FM stations, and a number of other organisations broadcast FM stations.

Most FM radio broadcast stations in Auckland are transmitted from the Sky Tower. In addition, MediaWorks Radio broadcast two stations from the Lochamber transmitter (located between Hatfields Beach and Waiwera), and four stations from the Moirs Hill transmitter (located between Puhoi and Warkworth). Two Chinese-language stations are broadcast from Waiheke Island, with another broadcasting from Pukekohe. A solar powered community radio station exists on Great Barrier Island, broadcasting from two locations (Port Fitzroy and Station Rock).

Frequency (MHz)	Name	Format	Owner	Transmitter	Broadcasting on frequency since	Previous stations on frequency
88.6	Mai FM	Urban contemporary	MediaWorks Radio	Sky Tower	1992	
88.9	More FM Rodney	Adult contemporary	MediaWorks Radio	Rodney Moirs Hill		
89.4	Newstalk ZB	Talk radio	NZME Radio	Sky Tower	10/2/1993	1983–1993 89 Stereo FM (also branded as Triple M, The New 89FM, 89Rock and 89X)
90.2	The Rock	Active rock	MediaWorks	Sky Tower	16/04/2023	1990 KeyWest 90.2FM; 1991–1993 Fine Music Radio 90.2FM; 1993–1994 Nuu FM; 1994–1999 Radio Pacific; 1999–18/03/2022 The Rock; 21/03/2022–30/03/2023 Today FM
90.6	FM90.6 New Zealand Chinese Radio	Chinese radio	Global CAMG Media Group	Waiheke Island	1997	
91.0	91ZM	Contemporary hit music	NZME Radio	Sky Tower	1997	1983–1993 Magic 91FM; 1993–1997 The Breeze on 91
91.8	More FM Auckland	Adult contemporary	MediaWorks Radio	Sky Tower	1993	1984 1ATS FM; 1985–1990 bFM; 1990 Radio i FM92; 1991 BBC World Service; 1992–1993 Today 92FM
92.6	RNZ Concert	Classical	Radio New Zealand	Sky Tower	1986	1985 Harbourlights FM (short term)
92.9	The Sound	Classic rock	MediaWorks Radio	Rodney Moirs Hill	01/02/2019	2009-18/01/2019 RadioLive; 19/01-31/01/2019 Magic Talk
93.4	The Breeze	Easy listening	MediaWorks Radio	Sky Tower	2006	1988 1OHS FM; 1990 CBA Christian; 1990 Easy 93FM; 1991–1993 Oldies 93.4; 1993–1997 Kool 93; 1997–2006 Solid Gold
93.8	The Sound	Classic rock	MediaWorks Radio	Sky Tower	2006	1993–1994 KAFM (Waiheke); 2003–2005 Channel Z 2005–2006 Kiwi FM
94.2	The Edge	Pop music	MediaWorks Radio	Sky Tower	2003	1989–1990 Oasis 94.2FM; 1990 Rock 94FM; 1991–1992 Te Reo o Tamaki Makaurau; 1994–1997 FM Country 94.2; 1997–2003 Channel Z
94.6	Aotea FM	Community radio	Aotea Community Radio Trust	Great Barrier Island Station Rock		
95.0	bFM	Student radio	Auckland University Students' Association	Sky Tower	1990	
95.8	Flava	Urban contemporary	NZME Radio	Sky Tower	2010	1994–1995 Q96; 1995–1997 Mai FM; 1997–2002 Counties Manukau Radio; 2003–2009 Real Good Life
96.1	Decommissioned					1997–1999 9inety6dot1 1999–2001 The Beat; 2001–2004 Cool Blue 96.1FM; 2004–2010 Flava (moved to 95.8FM)
96.6	George FM	House	MediaWorks Radio	Sky Tower	1998	1996–1998 Soul FM
97.4	The Hits 97.4	Adult contemporary	NZME Radio	Sky Tower	1989	
97.8	More FM Rodney	Adult contemporary	MediaWorks Radio	Rodney Lochamber		
98.2	Coast	Middle of the road	NZME Radio	Sky Tower	June 2020	1990–2012 Easy Listening i98FM; Viva (from 2005), Easy Mix (from 2007); 2012–2014 Radio Sport; 2014–2020 Mix
99.0	Radio Hauraki	Mainstream rock	NZME Radio	Sky Tower	1990	
99.4	Love FM	Cantonese	Best News Entertainment	Waiheke Island		2009–? Chinese Radio FM 99.4
99.8	Life FM	Contemporary Christian music	Rhema Media	Sky Tower	1997	FM Country 100; 1993–1997 Today 99.8FM
100.1	The Rock	Active rock	MediaWorks Radio	Rodney Moirs Hill	2016	
100.2	Decommissioned					2009–2016 RadioLive
100.6	Breeze Classic	1970s	MediaWorks Radio	Sky Tower	1/11/2025	1998–2001 George FM; 2005–2019 RadioLive (simulcast on 100.6 FM and 702 AM since 2005 but moved to 100.6 FM from 2015 until 05/01/2019 and then to 702 AM from 05/01/2019 until 19/01/2019); 2019–31/10/2025 Magic
101.4	RNZ National	Public radio	Radio New Zealand	Sky Tower	2000	
102.2	Radio 531pi	English & Pacific Island spoken & music programmes	Pacific Media Network	Skytower	15/04/2026	2006–2015 Kiwi FM; 2017 OnRoute FM (trial station)
103.0	Most recent licence expired 31/03/2010 (Skytower)					Praise FM Massey
103.8	Niu FM	Pacific mix	Pacific Media Network	Sky Tower	2003	
104.0	Aotea FM	Community radio	Aotea Community Radio Trust	Great Barrier Island Port Fitzroy		
104.2	Humm FM	Hindi radio	5Tunz Communications	Pukekohe Hill	Dec 2021	2009–2021 Chinese Radio FM 104.2
104.6	Planet FM	Public access radio	Access Community Radio Auckland	Sky Tower	2000	
104.9	The Breeze	Easy listening	MediaWorks Radio	Rodney Moirs Hill	2023	2016–2023 Magic; 2012–2016 The Rock
105.4	iHeartCountry New Zealand	Country music	NZME Radio	Sky Tower	09/05/2025	2001–2003 The Wolf; 2004-30/06/2020 Coast (to 98.2FM); 30/06/2020–09/05/2025 Gold
105.8	Radio Hydra		Radio Hydra Ltd	Piha Seaview Rd	Oct 2021	
106.2	Channel X	Classic alternative	MediaWorks Radio	Sky Tower	8 May 2023	2008–2010 Big 106.2; 2011–1/01/2022 Humm FM (to 104.2 FM); 1/01/2022–23/04/2023 The Rock back to 90.2 16/04/2023

== AM stations ==
There are nine AM radio broadcast stations in Auckland, broadcasting on eight frequencies. Radio New Zealand and Rhema Media each operate two stations with both operators sharing 882kHz for one of their stations. A number of community and private organisations operate AM radio stations.

Auckland AM stations are transmitted from Henderson from one mast owned by RNZ located to the north of the Lincoln Road interchange with the Northwestern Motorway.

Frequency (kHz)	Name	Format	Owner	Transmitter	Broadcasting on frequency since	Previous stations on frequency
603	Radio Waatea	Māori radio and news Bilingual Māori and English	UMA Broadcasting Ltd	Henderson	1999	1988–1994 Aotearoa Radio; 1995–1998 Yes AM
756	RNZ National	Public radio	Radio New Zealand	Henderson	1978	previously 1YA (1YA was also on 910, 650 and 760 kHz between 1923 and 1978)
882	AM Network; When Parliament is sitting	live coverage of NZ Parliament	Radio New Zealand	Henderson	1999	1978–1986 Concert Radio (broadcasting on 880AM between 1948 and 1978)
882	Sanctuary; When Parliament is not sitting	Christian radio	Rhema Media	Henderson	1999	1978–1986 Concert Radio (broadcasting on 880AM between 1948 and 1978); 1999–14/02/2025 Star rebranded Sanctuary
990	Apna 990AM	Indian radio	Privately owned	Henderson	2005	1995–1997 BBC World Service; 1997–2003 BBC Mandarin Service
1080	Newstalk ZB	Talk radio	NZME Radio	Henderson	1978	1978–1987 branded as 1ZB (1ZB was on 1090, 1190 and 1070kHz between 1926 and 1978); 1987–1993 branded as Newstalk 1ZB
1251	Rhema	Christian radio	Rhema Media	Henderson	1989	1978–1987 1ZM or 1251ZM (broadcasting on 1250AM between 1973 and 1978); 1987–1989 Classic Hits 1251 (still using 1ZM Callsign)
1386	Radio Tarana	Contemporary Indian radio	Privately owned	Henderson	1996	1991–1994 BBC World Service; 1995–1996 Radio Liberty
1593	Radio Samoa	Samoan radio	Samoa Multimedia Group	Henderson	1999	1979–1990 Radio Pacific; 1991–1997 Reo Atu Motu; 1997–1999 Southern Star

=== Decommissioned stations ===
RNZ replaced the northern mast and decommissioned the southern mast in May 2026 resulting in the removal of seven stations from the AM band.

Frequency (kHz)	Name	Format	Owner	Transmitter	Broadcasting on frequency since	Previous stations on frequency
531	Radio 531pi	English & Pacific Island spoken & music programmes	Pacific Media Network	old southern	1993	
702	Humm FM	Hindi radio	MediaWorks	old northern	31/03/2023	1990–2005 Radio Pacific; 2005–2015 Radio Live (simulcast on 100.6 FM and 702 AM since 2005 but moved to 100.6 FM from 2015 until 05/01/2019); 2015–2019 Magic Music (moved to 100.6 FM as at 05/01/2019); 2019–20/03/2022 Magic Talk; 21/03/2022–30/03/2023 Today FM
810	BBC World Service		Auckland Radio Trust	old northern	2005	1987–2000 Access Radio 810AM
936	Chinese Voice	Mandarin language	Best News Entertainment	old northern		1997–2002 Counties Manukau Radio; AM936 Chinese Radio
1179	Ake 1179	Ngāti Whātua music station	Te Rūnanga o Ngāti Whātua	old northern	2009	1996–2005 Ruia Mai; 2005–2009 Voice of Samoa
1332	Gold Sport	Greatest hits & Sports radio	NZME Radio	old southern	01/07/2020	1978–1997 Radio i1332 (previously on 1590AM and then 1330AM prior to 1978); 1997–1998 Sports Round Up; 1998–30/03/2020 Radio Sport; 30/03/2020–30/06/2020 Newstalk ZB
1476	Sport Nation	Sports radio	Entain New Zealand Ltd	old northern	19/11/2024	1978–1990 Radio Hauraki (previously on 1480AM between 1966 and 1978); 1990–1994 1476 Airport Radio; 1994–1997 The Point; 1997–2005 BBC World Service; 2005–2007 Radio Pacific and Radio Trackside; 2007–2015 LiveSport and Radio Trackside; 2015–2020 TAB Trackside Radio; 2021–2024 SENZ

== Low Power FM stations ==
There are numerous LPFM radio stations in Auckland.

Frequency (MHz)	Name	Format	Broadcast area	Broadcasting on frequency since
87.6	Matakana School Radio	Student radio	Matakana	
87.6	Radio Luke	Christian radio	Manurewa	
87.6	Splash FM	Pop music	Waiheke Island	
87.6	Waheguru Radio	Sikhism religion	Manukau	
87.6	West Coast Radio WCR 87.6FM	Community radio Top 40 News Sport and Weather	Auckland	2010
87.6	X FM		Auckland CBD	
87.7	African Voice FM	African Radio	Mount Albert, Massey West and North Shore	
87.7	Hindi Live News	Hindi radio	Auckland CBD	
87.7	NZ Mormon	Christian radio	Wiri	
87.7	Radio Masti FM	Hindi radio	Papatoetoe	
87.7	Tama-Ohi Radio	Tongan Christian radio	Glen Innes, Pakuranga and Howick	
87.8	Radio Austral	Spanish radio	Māngere	
87.8	HopeFM	Christian radio	Pukekohe and Runciman South	
87.8	Radio Mirchi FM	Hindi radio	South Auckland	
87.8	Seki A Samoa Radio	Samoan radio	Ōtāhuhu	
87.8	Sade Aala Radio 87.8	Punjabi radio	Manukau and Papatoetoe	
87.8	Waves of the Pacific	Pacific Island	Manurewa, Takanini,	2015
87.9	Radio SUR	Indian radio	Mount Roskill	
87.9	3ABN–Radio Waitac 87.9FM	Christian radio	Massey West, Te Atatū South, Te Atatū Peninsula and Henderson	
87.9	West Coast Radio WCR 87.6FM	Community radio Top 40 News Sport and Weather	West Rodney	
87.9	The Flat	Electronic	North Shore	2010
88.0	OLOTA WAVES FM	Samoan Christian Music and Easy Listening	Bombay and Pukekohe and South Auckland	
88.0	HCR-FM	Easy listening	Whangaparāoa Peninsula and Hibiscus Coast	
88.0	Make Disciples	Christian radio	Māngere, Papatoetoe, Onehunga and Ōtāhuhu	
88.0	The Flat	Electronic	West Auckland	2010
88.0	Radio Spice	Punjabi radio	Papatoetoe	
88.0	WPRT Radio	Mix of music and talk radio	Mount Eden	
88.1	EAST FM	Community Radio	East Auckland	2008
88.1	Springs FM/Echo FM		Western Springs	
88.1	LOT9 FM		Matakana, Leigh, Ōmaha and surrounding areas	
88.1	Static 88.1fm	Student radio	Auckland CBD	
88.1	BBI Breeze 88.1 fm	Student radio	Bucklands Beach	2012
88.2	The FleaFM	Community radio	Devonport	1999
88.3	Kool FM	Student radio	Auckland CBD	
88.3	Mountainside FM	Community radio	East Auckland	2005
88.3	DNA fm		Leigh	
88.3	Radio Manurewa	Socialist radio	Manurewa	
88.3	transmissionfm	Arts radio	Kingsland	
88.3	Waiheke Radio	Freeform community radio	Ostend and Onetangi	2008
106.7	Calvary Radio	Christian Radio	Glenfield	
106.7	Hotmix106		Auckland CBD	
106.7	Jack FM	Student radio	Auckland CBD	
106.7	Memories FM		Hillpark and Manurewa	
106.7	Metal FM	Heavy metal music	Penrose, New Zealand and Papatoetoe	
106.7	MoshBox Radio	Electronic music	Howick	
106.7	Reef Radio	Old-time radio	Point Chevalier	
106.7	SJAC 106.7fm	Christian radio	Māngere Bridge, Onehunga, Hillsborough and Penrose	
106.7	SNAP Radio	Community radio	Newmarket	
106.7	Southern Breeze	Country music	South Auckland	
106.8	Holiday FM	Oldies	Orewa and Parakai	
106.8	K FM		Howick	
106.8	M.A.D. FM	Community radio	Hobsonville	
106.8	Radio 24 Henderson 106.8	Oldies	Henderson	
106.8	XlinkFM/MashFM	Electronic music	Auckland CBD	
106.9	Kfm 106.9	Urban contemporary	Auckland CBD and Manukau City	
106.9	RYZ FM	Community radio	Mount Roskill	
107.0	BayFM	Community radio	Bayswater, Devonport, Belmont and Hauraki	
107.0	Panmure FM	Community Radio	Panmure, Mt Wellington, Glen Innes, Pakuranga	2018
107.0	Radio Virsa NZ	Religious broadcasting	Papatoetoe, Ōtāhuhu, Māngere and Manukau	
107.1	1 Time FM	Urban contemporary	Onehunga, One Tree Hill, Penrose and Royal Oak	
107.1	Blue Q FM		Auckland CBD	
107.1	EAST FM	Community Radio	East Auckland	2008
107.1	GOfm	Variety	Titirangi	2004
107.1	HopeFM	Christian radio	East Auckland	
107.1	MysteryFM	Freeform	Birkenhead	
107.1	The FleaFM	Community radio	Takapuna	
107.3	Base FM	Freeform Urban contemporary	Ponsonby and Grey Lynn	
107.3	Calvary Radio	Christian Radio	Manurewa	
107.3	Mountainside FM	Community radio	East Auckland	2005
107.3	Radio Kowhai	Student radio	Manurewa	
107.4	The Brew (Birkenhead Brewing)	Mix	Birkenhead	2016
107.4	Voqa kei Viti Aotearoa	Fijian Radio	Manukau and Papatoetoe	2015
107.4	Waiheke Radio	Freeform community radio	Oneroa and Blackpool	2008
107.5	CNX Global Radio	Electronic dance music		
107.5	Kilisitala 'O E 'Otu Felenite	Tongan radio		
107.5	Le'o 'oe Huelo Koula	Tongan Christian radio	Glenfield	
107.5	Le'o 'oe Tapuaki	Tongan Christian radio	Ōtāhuhu	
107.5	Radio 2000	Easy listening	Glendene	
107.5	Ripple FM	Contemporary and Classic Rock / Pop	Stillwater, and parts of Whangaparāoa Peninsula	also Streaming at eclectiquenewzealand.airtime.pro
107.5	TLC Radio West Auckland	Country music	West Auckland	
107.5	UP FM	Full spectrum dance music		2002
107.5	V3FM	Full spectrum old skool		2013
107.5	Water of Life	Christian radio	Manukau City	
107.6	The Village FM		Mairangi Bay	
107.7	Community Radio Browns Bay	Music and Community Announcements	Browns Bay only	2009
107.7	Nostalgia FM	Oldies	Glen Eden and Oratia	
107.7	Power FM	Urban contemporary	Avondale	
107.7	Radio Ponsonby	Community radio	Ponsonby	
107.7	Radio Rocks Auckland			
107.7	Spicy Mirchi FM	Indian community radio	Ōtāhuhu, Papatoetoe and Māngere	
107.7	Splat FM	Student radio	Whangaparāoa Peninsula	
107.7	TLC Radio Otahuhu	Country music	Ōtāhuhu	
107.7	XS80s	80's Music and Requests	Albany, New Zealand	2019

== Internet stations ==
There are a number of internet radio stations which stream and broadcast globally from Auckland, New Zealand. Internet radio is proving to become more popular, as stations tend to feature less ads, while also being able to report live listener statistics for advertisers.

Name	Format	Listen Live URL
Manukau Indian FM	Cultural Music and Documentaries	Listen Live
Metal Radio	Rock	Listen Live
Mouthfull Radio	Variety	Listen Live
Radiowave	Easy Listening	Listen Live
Retro Hit Radio	80s/90s	Listen Live
Sleep Radio	Ambience	Listen Live
SputnikFM	Mixed	Listen Live
Tiri 2	80s Yacht Rock	Listen Live
ZFM–Non Stop Hits	CHR/Top 40/Throwbacks	Listen Live

== Digital Audio Broadcasting (DAB) trial in Auckland ==
Kordia operated a DAB test service between October 2006 and 30 June 2018 transmitting from various Auckland locations on various frequencies in Band III. At the conclusion of the trial the transmissions were on 222.064 MHz from Waiatarua. The multiplex delivered a mix of DAB and DAB+ programmes in Auckland and Wellington.
