= Ostend, New Zealand =

Ostend
- Suburb
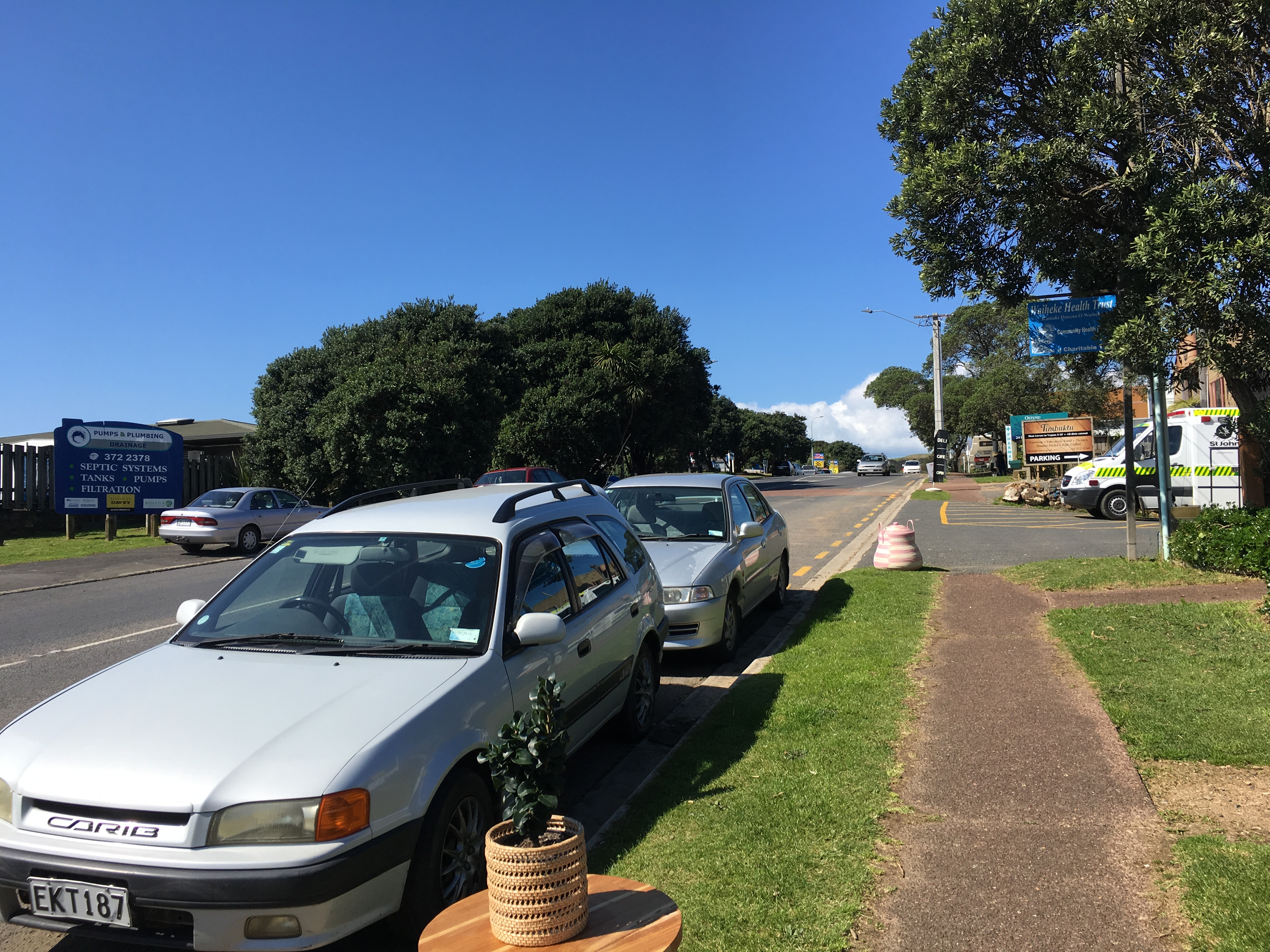
- Ostend, September 2018
- Interactive map of Ostend
- Coordinates: 36°47′50″S 175°02′50″E
- Country: New Zealand
- City: Auckland
- Local authority: Auckland Council
- Electoral ward: Waitematā and Gulf ward
- Local board: Waiheke Local Board

Area
  - Land: 391 ha (970 acres)

Population (June 2025)
  - Total: 2,020
  - Density: 517/km^{2} (1,340/sq mi)

Oneroa	Palm Beach	Onetangi
Surfdale	Ostend	Rural Waiheke
	(Putiki Bay)	Omiha

Ostend is a settlement on Waiheke Island, in New Zealand's Hauraki Gulf within the Auckland Region. Ostend is located in the west of the island, on and around a small peninsula which juts into Putiki Bay, one of two large indentations in the island's southwest coast. The southwest of the island contains much of the island's population, with Ostend being located immediately to the east of the settlement of Surfdale, and to the southwest of Onetangi.

Ostend is connected to Surfdale by a causeway which crosses the western arm of Putiki Bay. The area is used by boatsmen who moor their boats on the beach, as it is easy to access from the mainland marina at Half Moon Bay. Ostend is home to the island's only supermarket (Countdown), a branch office of the Auckland council, the island's Baptist church, and a medical centre. It is known as the industrial area of the island.

== History ==
In late 1915, a competition was held to decide the name of the new settlement, which was won by Miss Boylan, a resident of Auckland, who suggested the name Ostend, referencing the Belgian city of the same name, which had been a part of the theatre of World War I. The land at Ostend Estate was first auctioned on 18 February 1916. The name area originally referred to land at both Putiki Bay and Onetangi Bay (modern-day Ostend and Onetangi).

The Ostend Road District was established in 1921 to administer the area, in 1947 it was enlarged and renamed to Western Waiheke.

== Demographics ==
Ostend covers 3.91 km^{2} (1.51 sq mi) and had an estimated population of 2,020 as of June 2025, with a population density of 517 people per km^{2}.

Historical population
Year	Pop.	±% p.a.
2006	1,617	—
2013	1,734	+1.00%
2018	1,905	+1.90%
2023	1,983	+0.81%

Ostend had a population of 1,983 in the 2023 New Zealand census, an increase of 78 people (4.1%) since the 2018 census, and an increase of 249 people (14.4%) since the 2013 census. There were 972 males, 999 females and 12 people of other genders in 774 dwellings. 5.7% of people identified as LGBTIQ+. The median age was 46.2 years (compared with 38.1 years nationally). There were 288 people (14.5%) aged under 15 years, 273 (13.8%) aged 15 to 29, 948 (47.8%) aged 30 to 64, and 474 (23.9%) aged 65 or older.

People could identify as more than one ethnicity. The results were 86.8% European (Pākehā); 12.6% Māori; 4.8% Pasifika; 5.0% Asian; 5.6% Middle Eastern, Latin American and African New Zealanders (MELAA); and 1.8% other, which includes people giving their ethnicity as "New Zealander". English was spoken by 97.6%, Māori language by 3.3%, Samoan by 0.3%, and other languages by 15.3%. No language could be spoken by 1.4% (e.g. too young to talk). New Zealand Sign Language was known by 0.6%. The percentage of people born overseas was 34.0, compared with 28.8% nationally.

Religious affiliations were 20.0% Christian, 0.3% Hindu, 0.2% Islam, 0.5% Māori religious beliefs, 0.5% Buddhist, 1.1% New Age, and 1.4% other religions. People who answered that they had no religion were 69.0%, and 7.3% of people did not answer the census question.

Of those at least 15 years old, 477 (28.1%) people had a bachelor's or higher degree, 771 (45.5%) had a post-high school certificate or diploma, and 441 (26.0%) people exclusively held high school qualifications. The median income was $35,600, compared with $41,500 nationally. 168 people (9.9%) earned over $100,000 compared to 12.1% nationally. The employment status of those at least 15 was that 741 (43.7%) people were employed full-time, 309 (18.2%) were part-time, and 33 (1.9%) were unemployed.

== Education ==
One of the three schools on Waiheke Island is in Ostend. The others are in Surfdale.

Waiheke Primary School is a coeducational full primary school (years 1–8) with a roll of 277 as of July 2025.
