= Onetangi =

- Suburb
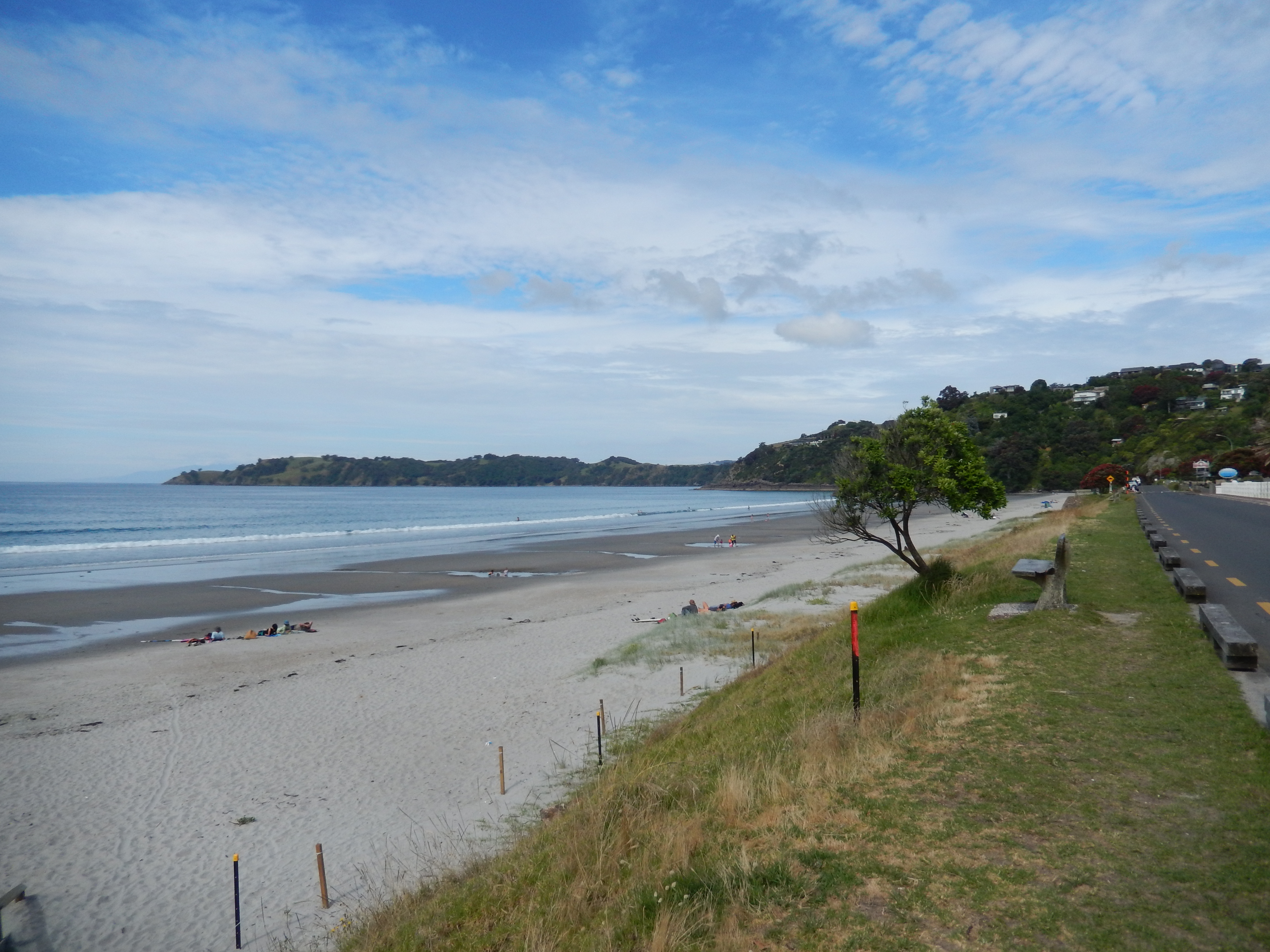
- Onetangi Beach
- Interactive map of Onetangi
- Coordinates: 36.788°S 175.081°E
- Country: New Zealand
- City: Auckland
- Local authority: Auckland Council
- Electoral ward: Waitematā and Gulf ward
- Local board: Waiheke Local Board

Area
  - Land: 596 ha (1,470 acres)

Population (June 2025)
  - Total: 1,400
  - Density: 230/km^{2} (610/sq mi)

	(Onetangi Bay)
Palm Beach	Onetangi	Rural Waiheke
Ostend	Rural Waiheke

Onetangi is a settlement on the north coast of Waiheke Island in New Zealand. It has a long white-sand beach fronting onto Onetangi Bay.

The name means "Weeping Sands" in the Māori language, and comes from a battle at Putiki o Kahu pā in 1821 during the Musket Wars. The area was subdivided for settlement in 1921.

The Museum of Waiheke opened in Onetangi in 1990. The beachfront is a popular area for holiday-makers and locals whom enjoy the temperate climate and fishing in the area. The bay also contains three restaurants; Charlie Farley’s ,Three Seven Two and Ki Maha.

== Demographics ==
Onetangi covers 5.96 km^{2} (2.30 sq mi) and had an estimated population of 1,400 as of June 2025, with a population density of 235 people per km^{2}.

Historical population
Year	Pop.	±% p.a.
2006	1,155	—
2013	1,134	−0.26%
2018	1,302	+2.80%
2023	1,368	+0.99%

Onetangi had a population of 1,368 in the 2023 New Zealand census, an increase of 66 people (5.1%) since the 2018 census, and an increase of 234 people (20.6%) since the 2013 census. There were 693 males, 672 females and 6 people of other genders in 579 dwellings. 6.1% of people identified as LGBTIQ+. The median age was 48.4 years (compared with 38.1 years nationally). There were 186 people (13.6%) aged under 15 years, 198 (14.5%) aged 15 to 29, 681 (49.8%) aged 30 to 64, and 306 (22.4%) aged 65 or older.

People could identify as more than one ethnicity. The results were 89.5% European (Pākehā); 13.4% Māori; 4.4% Pasifika; 3.9% Asian; 3.3% Middle Eastern, Latin American and African New Zealanders (MELAA); and 2.2% other, which includes people giving their ethnicity as "New Zealander". English was spoken by 98.9%, Māori language by 3.5%, Samoan by 0.4%, and other languages by 16.0%. No language could be spoken by 0.7% (e.g. too young to talk). New Zealand Sign Language was known by 0.2%. The percentage of people born overseas was 33.1, compared with 28.8% nationally.

Religious affiliations were 21.3% Christian, 0.4% Hindu, 1.1% Māori religious beliefs, 0.9% Buddhist, 0.4% New Age, and 2.0% other religions. People who answered that they had no religion were 69.3%, and 5.3% of people did not answer the census question.

Of those at least 15 years old, 399 (33.8%) people had a bachelor's or higher degree, 522 (44.2%) had a post-high school certificate or diploma, and 261 (22.1%) people exclusively held high school qualifications. The median income was $41,100, compared with $41,500 nationally. 198 people (16.8%) earned over $100,000 compared to 12.1% nationally. The employment status of those at least 15 was that 558 (47.2%) people were employed full-time, 195 (16.5%) were part-time, and 21 (1.8%) were unemployed.
