= Orapiu =

Settlement on Waiheke Island, New Zealand

- Interactive map of Orapiu
- Coordinates: 36.842°S 175.144°E
- Country: New Zealand
- Region: Auckland Region
- Ward: Waitematā and Gulf ward
- Community board: Waiheke Local Board
- Electorates: Auckland Central; Tāmaki Makaurau (Māori)

Government
  - Territorial Authority: Auckland Council

Area
  - Total: 0.41 km^{2} (0.16 sq mi)

Population (June 2025)
  - Total: 70
  - Density: 170/km^{2} (440/sq mi)

Orapiu is a rural settlement on the southeast coast of Waiheke Island in the Auckland Region of New Zealand. It is at the end of a small peninsula between Te Matuku Bay and Waiheke Channel.

There are no shops. Fullers360 run a daily ferry service between Auckland and Orapiu although this is not running as of 1 February 2025. Driving from the Matiatia ferry terminal takes about 50 minutes.

A coastal walk runs from Pearl Bay (part of Te Matuku Bay) and Orapiu Bay.

== History ==
Te Matuku Bay was used for food gathering and a place for waka to land by Māori living on Waiheke. It also was the site of the first pākehā settlement on Waiheke. There was a school.

The wharf was built in 1915. Orapiu was subdivided in 1916, although there were previously boarding houses there.

Orapiu Road Board was formed in 1921, and merged with the Ostend Road Board in 1947. It may have been the smallest local authority in New Zealand, controlling an area of 35 hectares (86 acres).

== Demographics ==
Statistics New Zealand describes Orapiu as a rural settlement, which covers 0.41 km^{2} (0.16 sq mi) and had an estimated population of 70 as of June 2025, with a population density of 171 people per km^{2}. Orapiu is part of the larger Waiheke East statistical area.

Historical population
Year	Pop.	±% p.a.
2013	48	—
2018	72	+8.45%
2023	66	−1.73%

Orapiu had a population of 66 in the 2023 New Zealand census, a decrease of 6 people (−8.3%) since the 2018 census, and an increase of 18 people (37.5%) since the 2013 census. There were 39 males and 30 females in 42 dwellings. The median age was 57.4 years (compared with 38.1 years nationally). There were 9 people (13.6%) aged under 15 years, 3 (4.5%) aged 15 to 29, 36 (54.5%) aged 30 to 64, and 18 (27.3%) aged 65 or older.

People could identify as more than one ethnicity. The results were 100.0% European (Pākehā), 18.2% Māori, and 4.5% Pasifika. English was spoken by 100.0%, Māori language by 4.5%, and other languages by 18.2%. The percentage of people born overseas was 31.8, compared with 28.8% nationally.

The only given religious affiliation was 36.4% Christian. People who answered that they had no religion were 54.5%, and 9.1% of people did not answer the census question.

Of those at least 15 years old, 18 (31.6%) people had a bachelor's or higher degree, 30 (52.6%) had a post-high school certificate or diploma, and 6 (10.5%) people exclusively held high school qualifications. The median income was $37,100, compared with $41,500 nationally. 9 people (15.8%) earned over $100,000 compared to 12.1% nationally. The employment status of those at least 15 was that 24 (42.1%) people were employed full-time, 9 (15.8%) were part-time, and 3 (5.3%) were unemployed.
