= Oneroa, New Zealand =

Oneroa
- Suburb
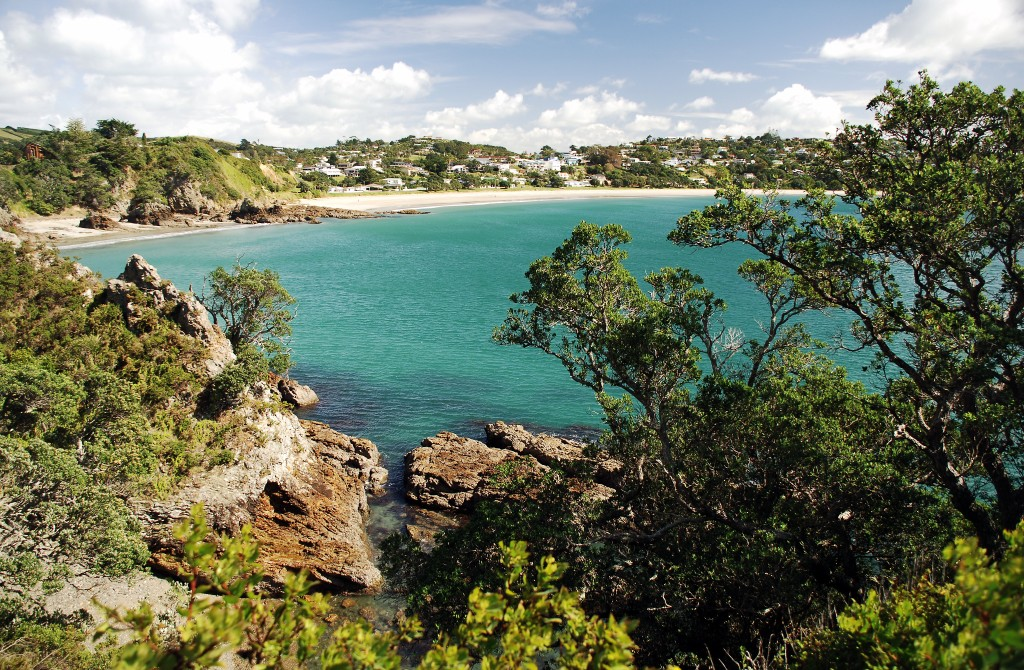
- Oneroa and Oneroa Bay
- Interactive map of Oneroa
- Coordinates: 36.782°S 175.009°E
- Country: New Zealand
- City: Auckland
- Local authority: Auckland Council
- Electoral ward: Waitematā and Gulf ward
- Local board: Waiheke Local Board

Area
  - Land: 842 ha (2,080 acres)

Population (June 2025)
  - Total: 1,390
  - Density: 165/km^{2} (428/sq mi)
- Ferry terminals: Matiatia

	(Hauraki Gulf)
Matiatia	Oneroa	Palm Beach
	Blackpool	Surfdale

Oneroa is a settlement on Waiheke Island in northern New Zealand.

The New Zealand Ministry for Culture and Heritage gives a translation of "long beach" for Oneroa.

Waiheke's Music Museum, a specialist music museum, has operated in Oneroa since 1996.

== Demographics ==
The statistical area of Oneroa West, which includes the suburb and areas west of it, covers 8.42 km^{2} (3.25 sq mi) and had an estimated population of 1,390 as of June 2025, with a population density of 165 people per km^{2}.

Historical population
Year	Pop.	±% p.a.
2006	1,287	—
2013	1,425	+1.47%
2018	1,434	+0.13%
2023	1,344	−1.29%

Oneroa West had a population of 1,344 in the 2023 New Zealand census, a decrease of 90 people (−6.3%) since the 2018 census, and a decrease of 81 people (−5.7%) since the 2013 census. There were 636 males, 702 females and 6 people of other genders in 660 dwellings. 6.9% of people identified as LGBTIQ+. The median age was 53.1 years (compared with 38.1 years nationally). There were 159 people (11.8%) aged under 15 years, 138 (10.3%) aged 15 to 29, 654 (48.7%) aged 30 to 64, and 393 (29.2%) aged 65 or older.

People could identify as more than one ethnicity. The results were 89.1% European (Pākehā); 10.7% Māori; 2.2% Pasifika; 4.2% Asian; 4.9% Middle Eastern, Latin American and African New Zealanders (MELAA); and 1.8% other, which includes people giving their ethnicity as "New Zealander". English was spoken by 98.2%, Māori language by 2.9%, Samoan by 0.2%, and other languages by 16.3%. No language could be spoken by 0.9% (e.g. too young to talk). New Zealand Sign Language was known by 0.4%. The percentage of people born overseas was 33.3, compared with 28.8% nationally.

Religious affiliations were 21.2% Christian, 0.2% Hindu, 0.2% Islam, 0.9% Māori religious beliefs, 1.1% Buddhist, 0.7% New Age, 0.4% Jewish, and 1.3% other religions. People who answered that they had no religion were 67.0%, and 7.4% of people did not answer the census question.

Of those at least 15 years old, 456 (38.5%) people had a bachelor's or higher degree, 492 (41.5%) had a post-high school certificate or diploma, and 243 (20.5%) people exclusively held high school qualifications. The median income was $39,300, compared with $41,500 nationally. 222 people (18.7%) earned over $100,000 compared to 12.1% nationally. The employment status of those at least 15 was that 498 (42.0%) people were employed full-time, 228 (19.2%) were part-time, and 21 (1.8%) were unemployed.
