= Blackpool, New Zealand =

Blackpool
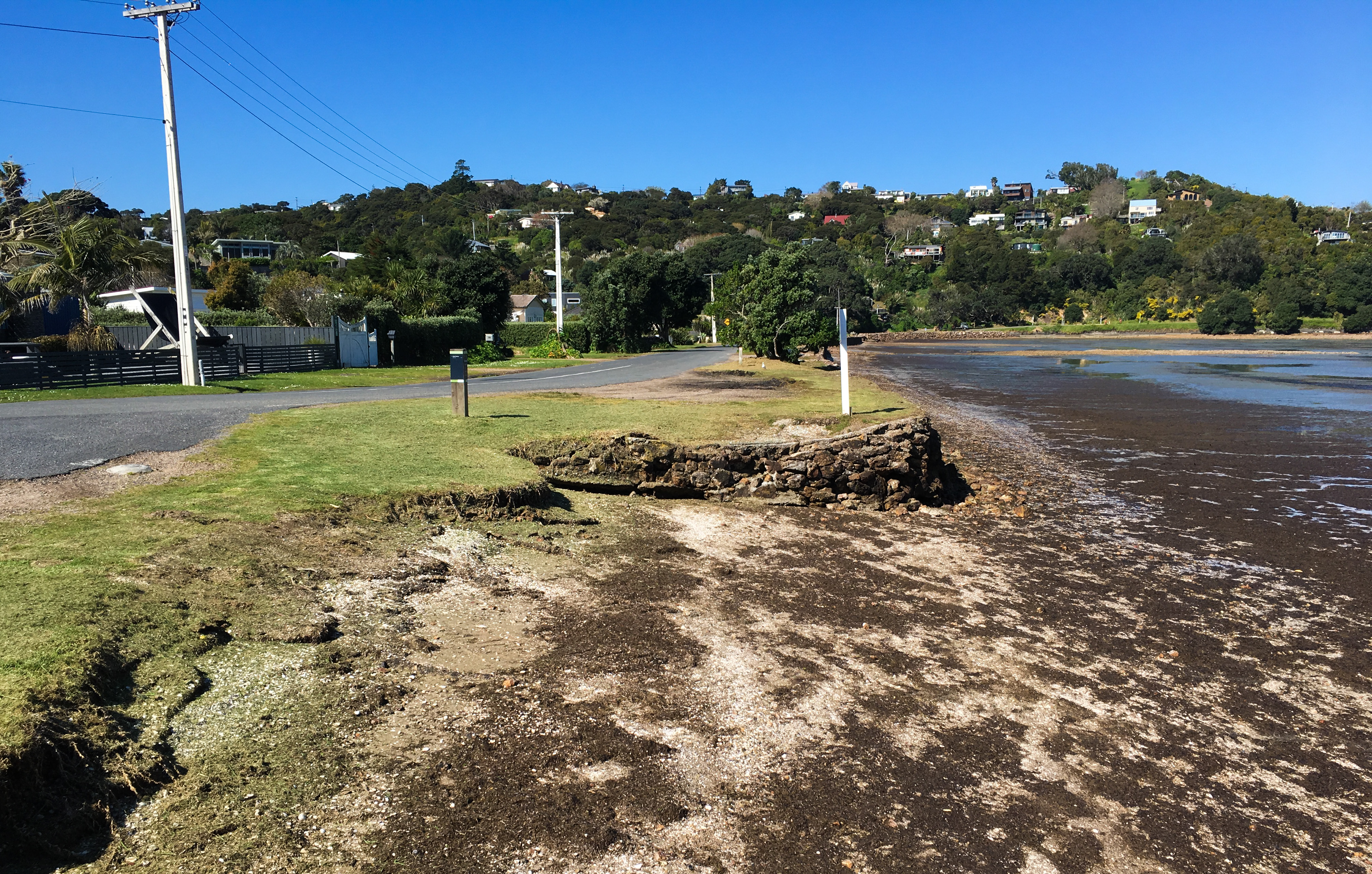
- Blackpool in September 2018

- Location within New Zealand
- Coordinates: 36°47′25″S 175°00′47″E
- Country: New Zealand
- Region: Auckland Region
- Territorial authority: Auckland Council
- Electoral Ward: Waitematā and Gulf ward
- Local Board: Waiheke Local Board

Oneroa	Palm Beach
Blackpool
(Huruhi Bay)	Surfdale

Blackpool is a settlement on Waiheke Island in northern New Zealand. It was named after Blackpool in England.

== Blackpool Beach ==
On the southern end of Huruhi Bay on the south coast.
