= Community and People of Waiheke Island =

New Zealand organisation

A token of victory: Auckland City Council (by then having purchased the company that proposed to redevelop Matiatia) pays CAPOW's court costs after a successful court action against the redevelopment.

The Community and People of Waiheke Island (CAPOW) was an incorporated society started 2003 representing much of the community of Waiheke Island, New Zealand, during the dispute over the proposed redevelopment of the Matiatia ferry wharf site. The group fought against a District Plan change giving permission given to a large retail development at the ferry terminal, and eventually won, with the Environment Court ruling that Auckland City Council had erred in allowing a development of such size to be given the go-ahead.

With this win, the incorporated society members voted to put the organisation into "vigilant mode" with a caretaker board of directors and an operational web site, capow.org.nz . The society maintains an active member list, so it may be activated without legal paperwork matters, should the need arise.
