= Retro Hit Radio =

- Auckland; New Zealand

Programming
- Format: Retro, Old School

Ownership
- Owner: private

Links
- Website: www.retrohitradio.co.nz

Retro Hit Radio is a radio station based in Auckland, New Zealand. Retro Hit Radio has a diverse music playlist predominantly from the 1980s and 1990s. The station broadcast on FM for the first six years, and is now an internet radio station.
