= Waiheke Radio =

Waiheke Radio/Island Radio
New Zealand
- Broadcast area: Waiheke Island
- Frequencies: 88.3 and 107.4 previously on 93.8

Programming
- Format: Freeform

Ownership
- Owner: Waiheke Community Radio Trust

History
- Former call signs: Island Radio 93.8FM

Technical information
- Power: LPFM
- Transmitter coordinates: 36.7947°S 175.0579°E

Links
- Website: http://www.waihekeradio.org.nz

Waiheke Radio is a not-for-profit, non-commercial Community radio service on Waiheke Island. The station offers the facilities, advice, training and technical support for individuals and groups to create and broadcast their own media and radio programmes. Waiheke's population has distinct and diverse needs and interests arising from the island's geographical isolation, mix of rural and suburban lifestyle, and broad demographic range and is arguably not well served by radio transmitted solely from Auckland.

The Waiheke Community Radio Trust established Waiheke Radio as a not-for-profit, community radio service for Waiheke in 2008 and began broadcasting on two Low Power FM transmitters later that year. One of the transmitters was paid for from a grant from the Waiheke Community Board. A community lease has also been secured in the Artworks complex in Oneroa after pressure was put on Auckland Council by members of the Waiheke Community board who lobbied for a month-to-month lease to be granted to the trust.

== History ==
=== Island Radio 93.8FM ===
In early 1991 Peter and Adrienne Young and directors launched Island Radio 93.8FM. This was Waiheke's first true community radio station. It was owned and operated by Peter Young, with volunteer deejays and a small paid admin staff.

Some of the more colourful personalities were Rick and Teddy, later Rick and Mitch in the morning, followed by Hariata with the morning show. Many eclectic personalities and people from different walks of life were involved with shows such as Rosso's Sports show on Saturday Morning, The Gay and Lesbian Show with Mara, and Bute Hewes with morning news and community affairs. It began at the Artworks complex in Oneroa.

In 1992, due to an increase in rent, the radio station was forced to move to premises next door at Number 4 Korora Road. Island Radio 93.8FM continued successfully for a number of years. Eventually the Waiheke frequency was lost due to the tendering process.

=== Beach Radio ===
Waiheke Radio was preceded by Beach Radio, a radio station situated in the Artworks complex in Oneroa. It was last owned and operated by long-time Auckland radio personality Barry Jenkin who did a breakfast show on the station, and featured a number of community-based shows. The station was run solely by volunteers and broadcast on 99.4FM or on 107FM for the Palm Beach and Onetangi areas. The station is now defunct having lost its frequency in the tendering process in 2008.

Island Life, a weekend news and events show on the Beach began to archive some of its broadcasts to ensure availability for years to come on The Internet Archive. Every May, to mark New Zealand Music Month, The Beach presented Live On The Beach, a series featuring Waiheke musicians playing live in the studio. The series was started in 2003 and proved so popular it became an annual event. Throughout the history of Live On The Beach it tried to showcase musicians who don't get the opportunity to perform in front of an audience on the Island whether it be because of their age, or because they are playing music that doesn't fit the solo acoustic blues format favoured by many of the local venues. Most of these performances have been recorded, and many are now available to listen to on the internet or download.

In 2006 The Beach launched its very own music awards, The Alternatuis, to showcase alternative artists like Steve Abel, Dudley Benson, Chris Knox and The Mint Chicks. At least two of these artists subsequently placed Alternatui winner stickers on the front of their CD releases.

=== Waiheke Community Radio Trust ===
The closure of Beach FM left the island without a radio broadcaster and created the opportunity for the development of a not-for-profit community station on the island. Many former trustees and hosts formed a new trust to start a replacement station. The Waiheke Community Radio Trust attended the August 2008 spectrum auction and was bidding on the 99.4 frequency which eventually sold for $380,000, putting it well out of the trust's reach. The successful bidder was World TV Limited, a company that runs a number of Asian-language TV and radio stations.

The $380,000 paid for the frequency was the second highest sum paid for any frequency in the country in this auction round. The last Waiheke Island frequency auctioned, in 2003, also went for a very large sum, $378,000. The effect of the high prices paid was that Waiheke interests were priced out of the market as there is not sufficient population to support either a commercial or non-commercial operation that had to recover such an amount.

=== Modern station ===
Waiheke Radio made its first live broadcast on Saturday 28 June 2008 from 7am to 12pm. The station hosted The Classic Gold Breakfast, a nationally networked Saturday morning breakfast show fronted by veteran broadcaster, Chris Diack who was visiting the island and worked with the Waiheke Radio volunteers to broadcast his breakfast show from the studio in Artworks. The show featured a number of local people, including students from Waiheke Primary School. The official opening of the radio station was 25 October 2008 and the station is now broadcasting a variety of specialist music and interview style shows. Among these shows is the Hour of Power, presented by Raz Chianti and Jahn Vann. The Hour of Power broadcasts on Tuesday evenings at 7.30pm. In August 2022, The WayUp Radio Show debuted, featuring locals Paul, Justin, Wayan and Jahn. Andrew and Dean are occasional announcers. The WayUp Radio show channels positivity through good banter and an eclectic mix of electronic dance and soul/ hip-hop classics. The WayUp Radio show runs from 7pm-9pm every Tuesday. The name WayUp is both a play on announcer Wayan's name and a reflection of the uplifting nature of the show.
