= Mātiatia =

Coordinates: 36.781128°S 174.992590°E

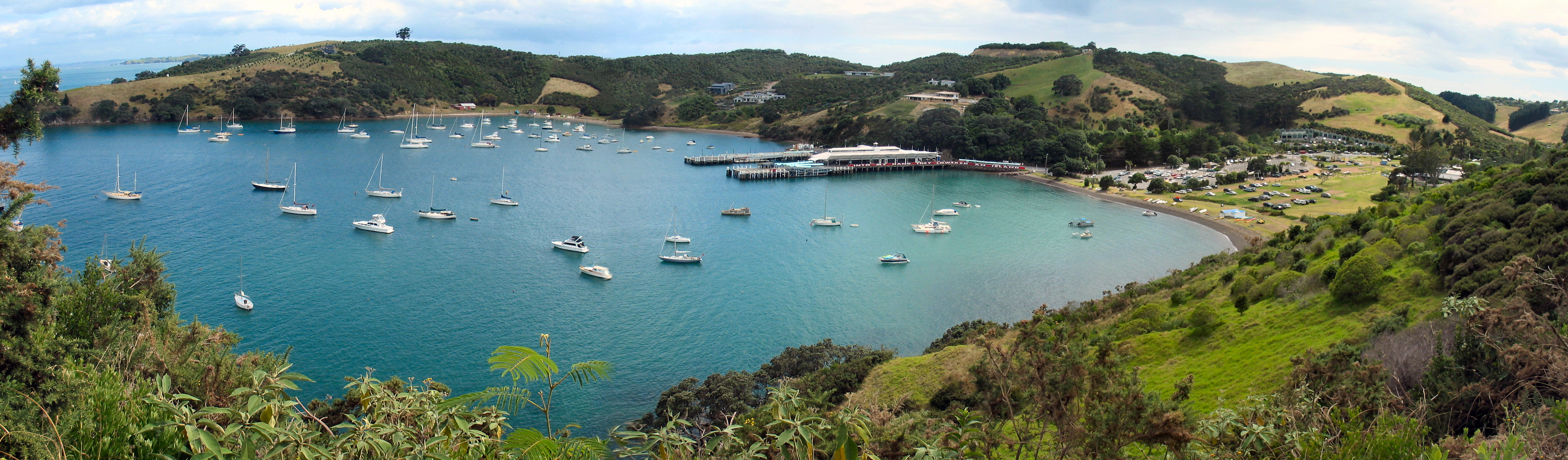
The valley and bay of Mātiatia.

Mātiatia is a location at the western end of Waiheke Island, in New Zealand's Hauraki Gulf. The name is used for both a valley and its surrounding hills, with the valley stretching down to a foreshore and wharf on the gulf. Mātiatia is known as "The Gateway to Waiheke Island".

The Māori language name mātiatia is shared with a type of beach grass, Poa triodioides, now rare at Mātiatia, which was said to have grown at the ground where a former Māori Village once stood. In 2023, the New Zealand Geographic Board listed "Mātiatia Bay" as the official name for the bay.
