= The Wolf (radio network) =

The Wolf was a radio network in New Zealand based from Lake Tekapo in South Canterbury. The station operated between 2001 and 2003 and was independently owned and operated by former Radio Network presenter Russ Down. The Wolf broadcast to rural areas, where in some cases the larger network stations did not broadcast or operate local stations. The Wolf started at a time when many New Zealand stations had been taken over by New Zealand's two largest radio companies The Radio Network and MediaWorks NZ or replaced with a network product based from one of the main centres, particularly Auckland.

Due to funding issues, the network went off the air permanently in 2003.

== Regions of The Wolf Broadcast to ==
The Wolf broadcast nationwide through the Sky Digital service, and on AM or FM in the following areas:

- 91.9 FM – Hokitika
- 97.8 FM – Lake Tekapo
- 99.0 FM – Kāpiti Coast
- 100.6 FM – Temuka, Blenheim, Kaikōura, Methven, Waimate, Oamaru, Alexandra, Gore, Mount Cook Village, Reefton, Geraldine, Twizel, Fairlie, Murchison, Timaru, Westport, Hanmer Springs, Karamea
- 105.4 FM – Auckland
- 1593 AM – Christchurch
