= Ōmiha =

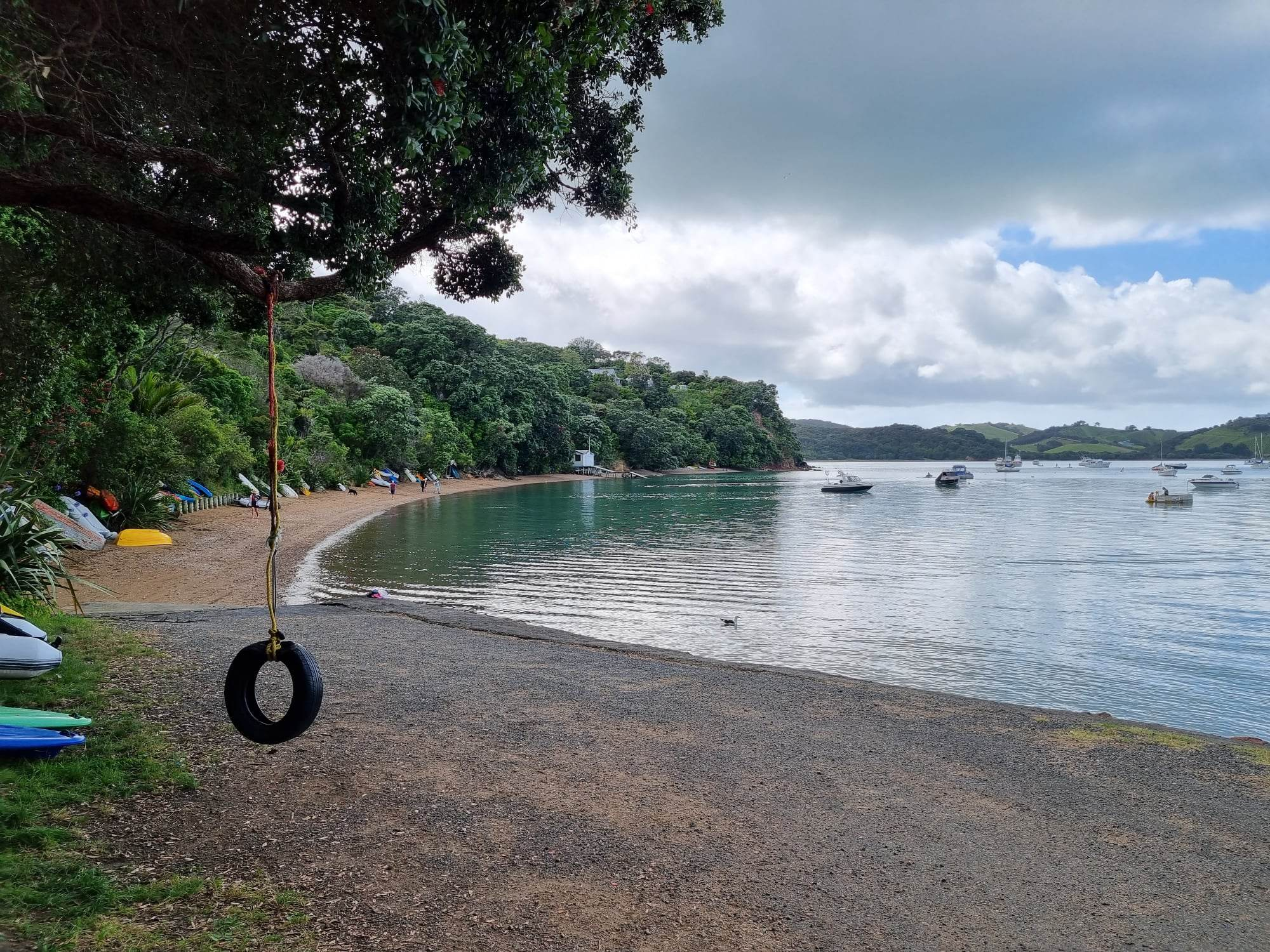
- Ōmiha Bay
- Interactive map of Ōmiha
- Coordinates: 36.816°S 175.057°E
- Country: New Zealand
- Region: Auckland Region
- Ward: Waitematā and Gulf ward
- Community board: Waiheke Local Board
- Electorates: Auckland Central; Tāmaki Makaurau

Government
  - Territorial Authority: Auckland Council

Area
  - Total: 0.71 km^{2} (0.27 sq mi)

Population (June 2025)
  - Total: 550
  - Density: 770/km^{2} (2,000/sq mi)

Ōmiha is a rural settlement on the southwest coast of Waiheke Island in the Auckland Region of New Zealand. The settlement began when the O'Brien brothers subdivided their farm in 1922, naming it "Omiha Beach Estate". The area is also known as Rocky Bay from the bay to the south. A proposal that the name change to Rocky Bay in 2017 met strong opposition and was rejected. The name Ōmiha, with the macron, became official in 2018.

== Demographics ==
Statistics New Zealand describes Ōmiha as a rural settlement, which covers 0.71 km^{2} (0.27 sq mi) and had an estimated population of 550 as of June 2025, with a population density of 775 people per km^{2}. Ōmiha is part of the larger Waiheke East statistical area.

Historical population for Ōmiha
Year	Pop.	±% p.a.
2006	342	—
2013	453	+4.10%
2018	558	+4.26%
2023	534	−0.88%
The 2006 population is for a smaller area of 0.63 km^{2}. Source:

Ōmiha had a population of 534 in the 2023 New Zealand census, a decrease of 24 people (−4.3%) since the 2018 census, and an increase of 81 people (17.9%) since the 2013 census. There were 255 males, 279 females and 3 people of other genders in 249 dwellings. 9.0% of people identified as LGBTIQ+. The median age was 52.7 years (compared with 38.1 years nationally). There were 45 people (8.4%) aged under 15 years, 75 (14.0%) aged 15 to 29, 276 (51.7%) aged 30 to 64, and 138 (25.8%) aged 65 or older.

People could identify as more than one ethnicity. The results were 88.8% European (Pākehā); 12.4% Māori; 5.1% Pasifika; 1.7% Asian; 5.6% Middle Eastern, Latin American and African New Zealanders (MELAA); and 2.2% other, which includes people giving their ethnicity as "New Zealander". English was spoken by 97.2%, Māori language by 2.8%, Samoan by 0.6%, and other languages by 17.4%. No language could be spoken by 1.7% (e.g. too young to talk). New Zealand Sign Language was known by 0.6%. The percentage of people born overseas was 35.4, compared with 28.8% nationally.

Religious affiliations were 17.4% Christian, 1.7% Buddhist, 1.7% New Age, and 2.2% other religions. People who answered that they had no religion were 69.1%, and 9.0% of people did not answer the census question.

Of those at least 15 years old, 171 (35.0%) people had a bachelor's or higher degree, 192 (39.3%) had a post-high school certificate or diploma, and 126 (25.8%) people exclusively held high school qualifications. The median income was $39,800, compared with $41,500 nationally. 81 people (16.6%) earned over $100,000 compared to 12.1% nationally. The employment status of those at least 15 was that 222 (45.4%) people were employed full-time, 75 (15.3%) were part-time, and 12 (2.5%) were unemployed.

=== Waiheke East ===
Waiheke East statistical area covers the rural area of Waiheke Island, including the settlement of Orapiu, and also the smaller islands of the Hauraki Gulf including Ponui Island, Pakihi Island and Rotoroa Island, none of which have a substantial population. Waiheke East covers 87.58 km^{2} (33.81 sq mi) and had an estimated population of 1,140 as of June 2025, with a population density of 13 people per km^{2}.

Historical population for Waiheke East
Year	Pop.	±% p.a.
2006	822	—
2013	903	+1.35%
2018	1,071	+3.47%
2023	1,092	+0.39%

Waiheke East had a population of 1,092 in the 2023 New Zealand census, an increase of 21 people (2.0%) since the 2018 census, and an increase of 189 people (20.9%) since the 2013 census. There were 549 males, 540 females and 3 people of other genders in 486 dwellings. 6.9% of people identified as LGBTIQ+. The median age was 51.6 years (compared with 38.1 years nationally). There were 111 people (10.2%) aged under 15 years, 150 (13.7%) aged 15 to 29, 579 (53.0%) aged 30 to 64, and 249 (22.8%) aged 65 or older.

People could identify as more than one ethnicity. The results were 88.7% European (Pākehā); 11.8% Māori; 3.0% Pasifika; 2.7% Asian; 4.9% Middle Eastern, Latin American and African New Zealanders (MELAA); and 2.7% other, which includes people giving their ethnicity as "New Zealander". English was spoken by 97.3%, Māori language by 3.0%, Samoan by 0.3%, and other languages by 17.9%. No language could be spoken by 1.4% (e.g. too young to talk). New Zealand Sign Language was known by 0.3%. The percentage of people born overseas was 35.4, compared with 28.8% nationally.

Religious affiliations were 20.3% Christian, 0.5% Māori religious beliefs, 1.4% Buddhist, 0.8% New Age, and 1.4% other religions. People who answered that they had no religion were 68.1%, and 8.0% of people did not answer the census question.

Of those at least 15 years old, 348 (35.5%) people had a bachelor's or higher degree, 408 (41.6%) had a post-high school certificate or diploma, and 228 (23.2%) people exclusively held high school qualifications. The median income was $39,200, compared with $41,500 nationally. 165 people (16.8%) earned over $100,000 compared to 12.1% nationally. The employment status of those at least 15 was that 456 (46.5%) people were employed full-time, 174 (17.7%) were part-time, and 21 (2.1%) were unemployed.
