= Waiheke Island =

Island in the Hauraki Gulf of New Zealand

Waiheke (Māori)
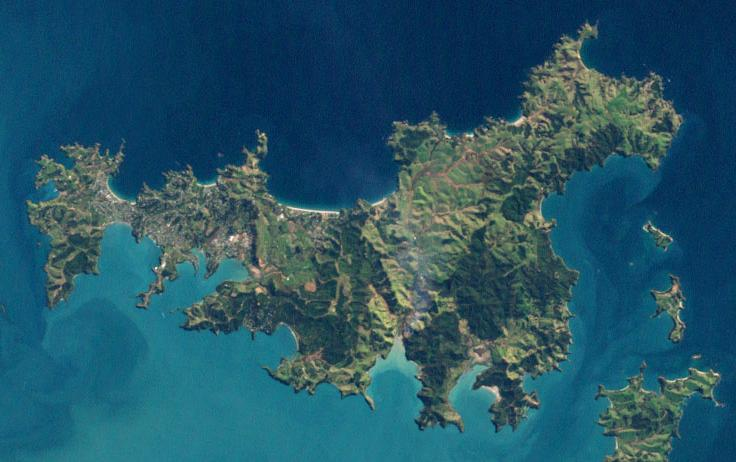
- Landsat image of the island, August 2002

- Location in New Zealand & Pacific Ocean Waiheke Island (Pacific Ocean)
- Interactive map of Waiheke Island

Geography
- Location: Hauraki Gulf
- Coordinates: 36°48′S 175°06′E
- Archipelago: New Zealand archipelago
- Area: 92 km^{2} (36 sq mi)
- Length: 19.3 km (11.99 mi)
- Width: 0.64–9.65 km (0.40–6.00 mi)
- Coastline: 133.5 km (82.95 mi)
- Highest elevation: 231 m (758 ft)
- Highest point: Maunganui

Administration
- New Zealand
- Regional Council: Auckland Region

Demographics
- Demonym: Waihekean
- Population: 9,310 (June 2025)
- Pop. density: 83/km^{2} (215/sq mi)
- Ethnic groups: European, Māori

Waiheke Island (Note: (/waɪˈhɛkiː/; Māori: [ˈwaihɛkɛ])) is the second-largest island (after Great Barrier Island) in the Hauraki Gulf of New Zealand. Its ferry terminal in Matiatia Bay at the western end is 21.5 km (13.4 mi) from the central-city terminal in Auckland.

It is the most populated island in the gulf, with 9,310 permanent residents, and the third most populous island in New Zealand (behind the two main islands). An additional estimated 3,400 people have second homes or holiday homes on the island. It is more densely populated than the North and South Islands. It is the most accessible island in the gulf, with regular passenger and car-ferry services, a helicopter operator based on the island, and other air links.

In November 2015, Lonely Planet rated Waiheke Island the fifth-best region in the world to visit in 2016.

== Geography ==
=== Overview ===
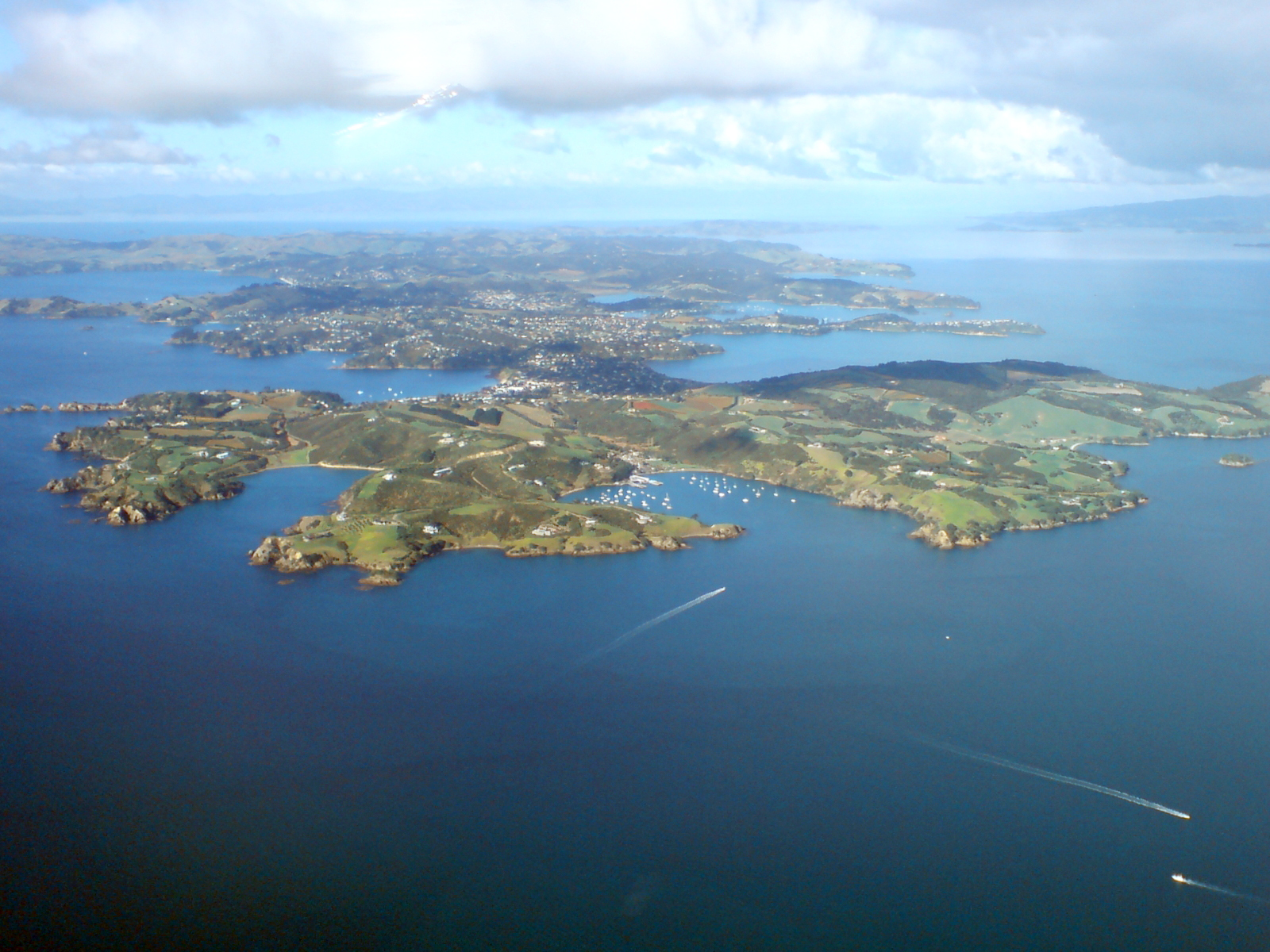
The western part of the island

The island is off the coast of the North Island. It is 19.3 km (12.0 mi) in length from west to east, varies in width from 0.64 to 9.65 km (0.40 to 6.00 mi), and has a surface area of 92 km^{2} (36 sq mi). The coastline is 133.5 km (83.0 mi), including 40 km (25 mi) of beaches. The port of Matiatia at the western end is 17.7 km (11.0 mi) from Auckland and the eastern end is 21.4 km (13.3 mi) from Coromandel. The much smaller Tarahiki Island lies 3 km (1.9 mi) to the east.

The island is very hilly with few flat areas, the highest point being Maunganui at 231 m (758 ft).

Approximately 17,000 years ago during the Last Glacial Maximum when sea levels were over 100 metres lower than present day levels, Waiheke Island was landlocked to the North Island, surrounded by a vast coastal plain where the Hauraki Gulf / Tīkapa Moana exists today. Sea levels began to rise 7,000 years ago, after which Waiheke became an island separated from the rest of New Zealand.

=== Geology ===
Much of eastern Waiheke island is the remains of a Miocene volcano of the Kiwitahi Group, which erupted approximately 15 million years ago. There are locations of interest to geologists: an argillite outcrop in Ōmiha, and a chert stack at the end of Pohutukawa Point, considered "one of the best exposures of folded chert in Auckland City".

=== Beaches ===
There are many scenic beaches, including:

- Oneroa Beach – The main beach, on the northern side of the town of Oneroa. It has free BBQ facilities, public toilets and a swing for children.
- Little Oneroa Beach – A small secluded beach at the east end of Oneroa Beach, separated by a protruding cliff wall. It has free BBQ facilities, public toilets and a children's playground.
- Palm Beach – Similar in shape to Oneroa Beach (complete with protruding cliff wall at the east end that separates a small private beach in Boatshed Bay), it gets its name from the mature phoenix palms at the east end, where a public toilet and free BBQ facilities are also located. There is a children's playground in the middle section of the beach which also has a free BBQ area, public toilets and an outdoor public shower.
- Little Palm Beach – A small clothes-optional beach (by custom) at the west end of Palm Beach. New Zealand has no official nude beaches, as public nudity is legal on any beach where it is "known to occur".
- Blackpool Beach – The south-facing counterpart of Oneroa Beach, lining Blackpool and popular for kayaking and windsurfing.
- Surfdale Beach – A zoned-in beach on the southern side of Surfdale, separated from Blackpool Beach by a small protruding peninsula, which has a scenic unsealed route called The Esplanade linking the beaches. Popular for kitesurfing. Also has a free BBQ area and children's playground.
- Onetangi Beach – A 1.87-kilometre (1.16-mile) long, north-facing beach lining Onetangi, a Māori name meaning "weeping sands". It was the site of a battle between Ngapuhi from Te Tai Tokerau and Ngati Paoa (Waiheke mana whenua) during which many Ngati Paoa villagers were slaughtered on the beach.
- For many years it has been the site of the Onetangi Beach Horse Races. Its western end, often inaccessible at high tide, is clothes-optional. It has sandcastle-building contests annually; participants have a few hours to build their creations in soft sand that is free of shells and suitable for digging. Free BBQ and public facilities.
- Cactus Bay – Considered by many Waihekeans as the most perfect beach and, with nearby Garden Cove, a romantic place for picnicking. The beach is accessible only by boat or kayak, as its land access was blocked off by a private landowner.
- Shelly Beach – A small and well sheltered shell and stone beach located between Oneroa and Ostend. It has free BBQ facilities, a public toilet and a diving platform located just off shore. It is a popular choice with families as at high tide, it is often calm and flat – ideal for children (but not sandy).
Beaches on Waiheke Island
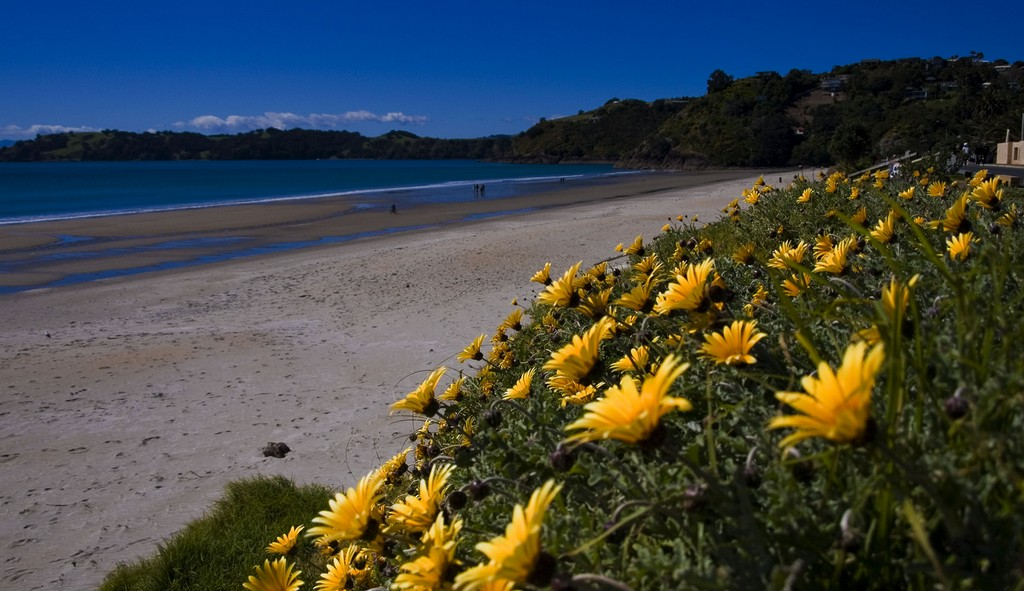
Onetangi Beach

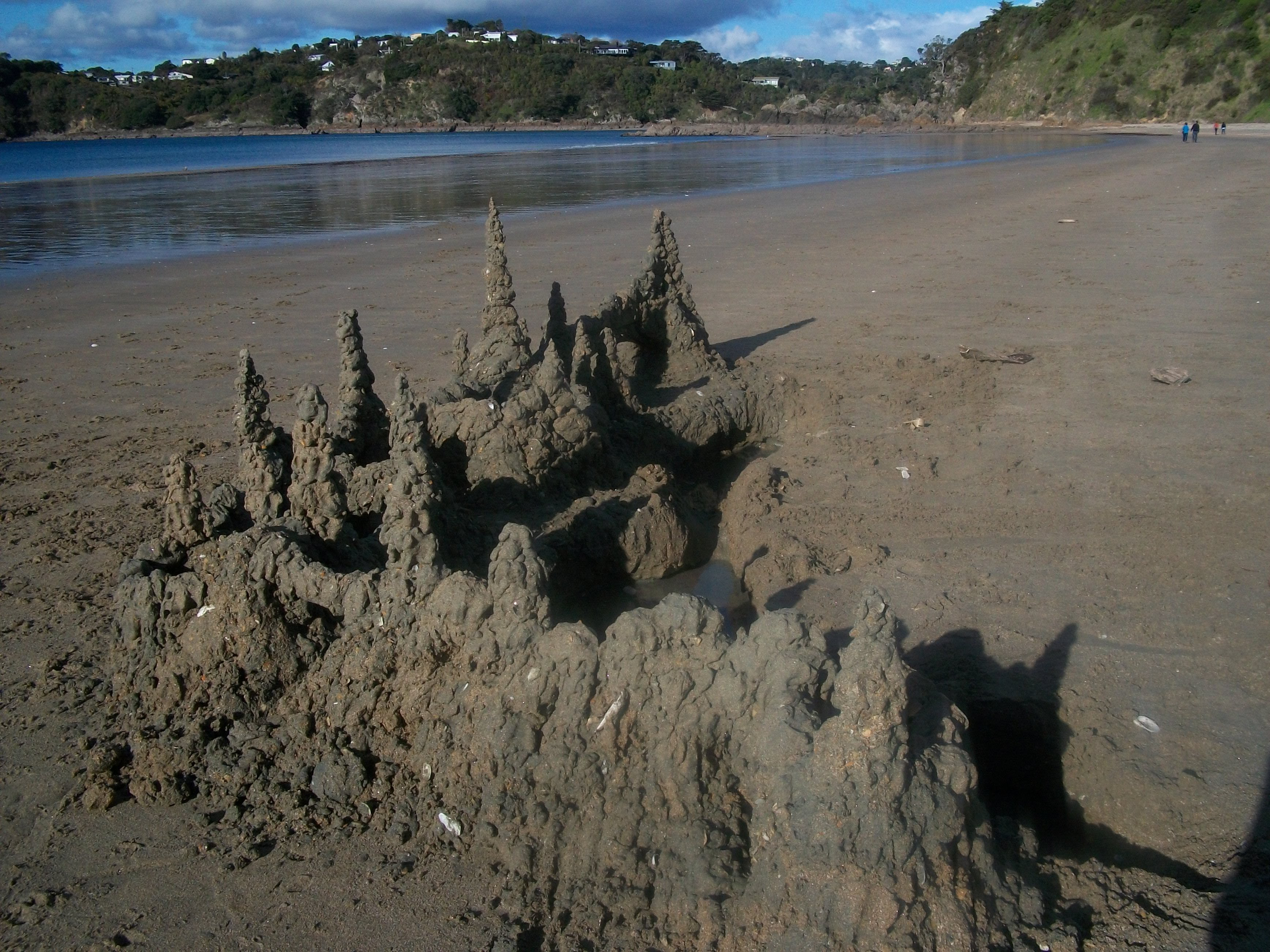
Sandcastle on Oneroa Beach

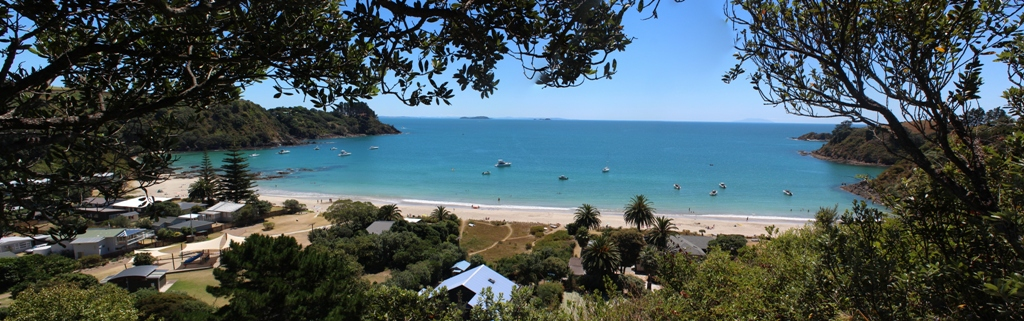
Palm Beach

== Climate ==
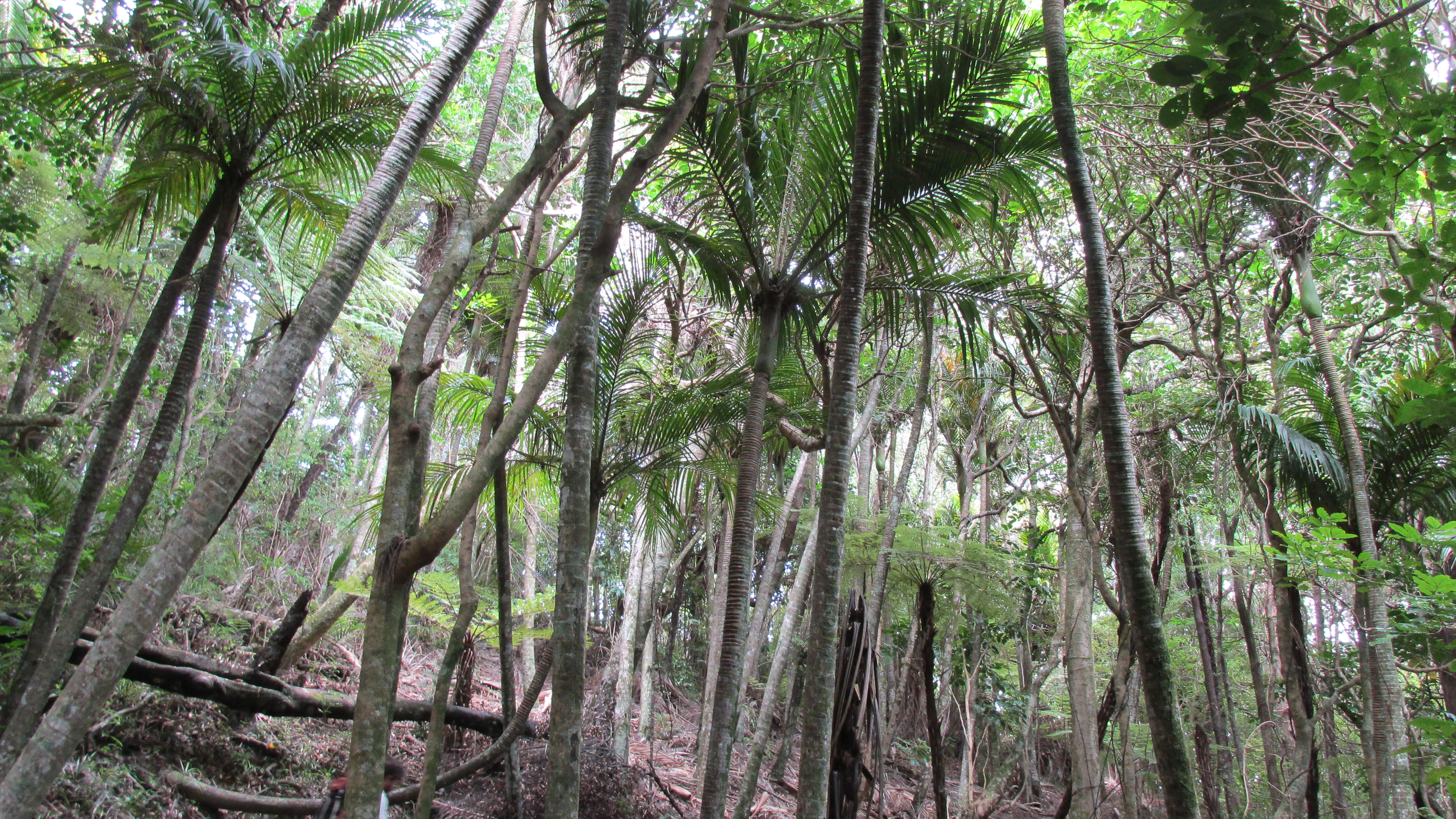
Native bush in Onetangi Reserve

Waiheke, like Auckland, experiences a subtropical climate according to the Trewartha climate classification, and an oceanic climate according to the Köppen climate classification. The region lies 13° of latitude south of the Tropic of Capricorn, so tropical plants which are protected for the winter months will flower and fruit in the summer, and cold climate vegetables planted in autumn will mature in early spring. Summers tend to be warm and humid, while winters are relatively mild with frost being a rare event on Waiheke.

Rainfall is typically plentiful, though dry spells may occur during the summer months which can be problematic for many of the island residents, the vast majority of whom rely on rainwater harvesting from residential roofs for drinking and household use. During such dry periods (typically 3–4 months between December and March), the island's water-delivery trucks can be seen replenishing residential water tanks that have run dry.

It is often anecdotally said by locals that Waiheke has a different micro-climate from the Auckland isthmus. Though little data supports this, the following data from a NIWA report suggests Waiheke receives over 100 hours more sunshine a year than other parts of Auckland.

Annual mean temperature	Annual precipitation	Annual sunshine hours
15.2 °C	1461mm	2100

Climate data for Awaroa Valley, Waiheke Island (1991–2020 normals, extremes 1984–present)
Month	Jan	Feb	Mar	Apr	May	Jun	Jul	Aug	Sep	Oct	Nov	Dec	Year
Record high °C (°F)	31.2 (88.2)	30.0 (86.0)	29.0 (84.2)	26.5 (79.7)	23.5 (74.3)	21.0 (69.8)	19.8 (67.6)	19.6 (67.3)	22.5 (72.5)	24.0 (75.2)	26.4 (79.5)	29.7 (85.5)	31.2 (88.2)
Mean maximum °C (°F)	27.5 (81.5)	28.0 (82.4)	26.7 (80.1)	24.6 (76.3)	21.7 (71.1)	19.0 (66.2)	17.8 (64.0)	18.5 (65.3)	20.1 (68.2)	21.2 (70.2)	23.6 (74.5)	25.8 (78.4)	28.2 (82.8)
Mean daily maximum °C (°F)	24.3 (75.7)	25.0 (77.0)	23.5 (74.3)	21.2 (70.2)	18.5 (65.3)	16.0 (60.8)	15.2 (59.4)	15.7 (60.3)	17.0 (62.6)	18.4 (65.1)	20.1 (68.2)	22.3 (72.1)	19.8 (67.6)
Daily mean °C (°F)	19.4 (66.9)	20.0 (68.0)	18.4 (65.1)	16.4 (61.5)	14.1 (57.4)	12.0 (53.6)	11.1 (52.0)	11.6 (52.9)	12.8 (55.0)	14.2 (57.6)	15.7 (60.3)	18.0 (64.4)	15.3 (59.6)
Mean daily minimum °C (°F)	14.5 (58.1)	15.0 (59.0)	13.3 (55.9)	11.5 (52.7)	9.7 (49.5)	8.0 (46.4)	6.9 (44.4)	7.5 (45.5)	8.7 (47.7)	10.0 (50.0)	11.2 (52.2)	13.6 (56.5)	10.8 (51.5)
Mean minimum °C (°F)	9.2 (48.6)	10 (50)	8.2 (46.8)	5.6 (42.1)	2.8 (37.0)	1.3 (34.3)	0.1 (32.2)	1.4 (34.5)	3.1 (37.6)	4.5 (40.1)	5.4 (41.7)	8.3 (46.9)	−0.3 (31.5)
Record low °C (°F)	5.7 (42.3)	7.6 (45.7)	3.5 (38.3)	2.4 (36.3)	−1.7 (28.9)	−1.6 (29.1)	−2.0 (28.4)	−1.5 (29.3)	−0.6 (30.9)	0.0 (32.0)	3.0 (37.4)	4.6 (40.3)	−2.0 (28.4)
Average rainfall mm (inches)	66.5 (2.62)	75.4 (2.97)	94.6 (3.72)	105.2 (4.14)	118.5 (4.67)	138.9 (5.47)	153.6 (6.05)	134.7 (5.30)	106.6 (4.20)	91.8 (3.61)	76.0 (2.99)	95.7 (3.77)	1,257.5 (49.51)
Source: NIWA

== Natural history ==
Native birds found on Waiheke include kererū, kokoeā (cuckoos), kōtare, mātātā, pīhoihoi, pīpīwharauroa, pīwakawaka (fantails), pūkeko, tauhou (silvereyes), tūī, and weka. New Zealand's three native birds of prey all occur: the kārearea (NZ falcon), the kahu (swamp harrier), and the ruru. Exotic birds include sparrows, finches, yellowhammers, blackbirds, starlings, myna, magpies, grey warblers, pheasants, and skylarks. Less common birds include peacocks, New Zealand red-crowned parakeet, and kaka. There have been occasional sightings of korimako, but they do not seem to have established a viable population. There have been two attempts to release korimako on Waiheke: the first was by Mike Lee in 1990–1991, the next involved the Auckland Regional Council, Manaaki Whenua Landcare Research, and the Department of Conservation in 2010. Both were unsuccessful.

Birds living around shorelines, beaches and wetlands include southern black-backed gulls, red-billed gulls, Australasian gannets, white-fronted terns, grey-faced petrels, bar-tailed godwits, spotted shags, pied stilts, variable oystercatchers, New Zealand dotterels, brown teal, banded rails, Paradise ducks, and little penguins

Due to combined efforts of the organisation Save the Kiwi, Ngāti Paoa, Ngāi Tai ki Tāmaki, Te Korowai o Waiheke, Pōnui Island landowners, and the Department of Conservation, ten kiwi were transferred from neighbouring Pōnui Island to the Te Matuku Peninsula at the eastern end of Waiheke Island in mid-2025. The kiwi were welcomed to Waiheke at Piritahi Marae with a pōwhiri. In October 2025, the first kiwi chick from these ten hatched on Waiheke and was captured on video. A transmitter linked to a male adult kiwi had shown he had been incubating.

== History ==
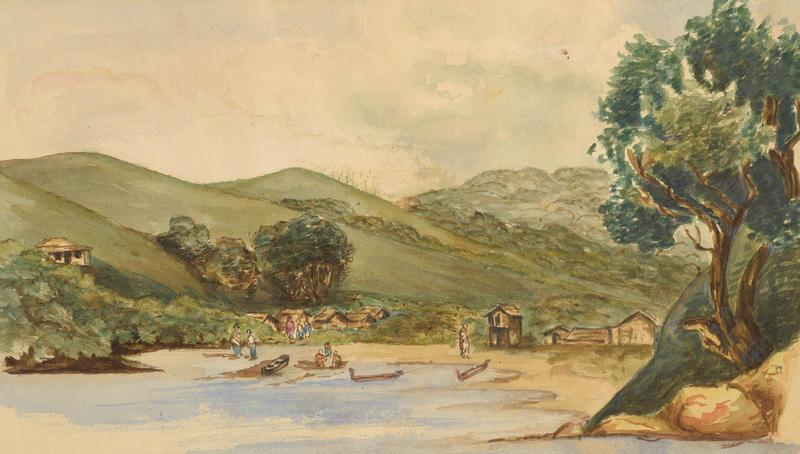
Putiki in the Island of Waiheke, a 19th-century watercolour by Thomas Hutton

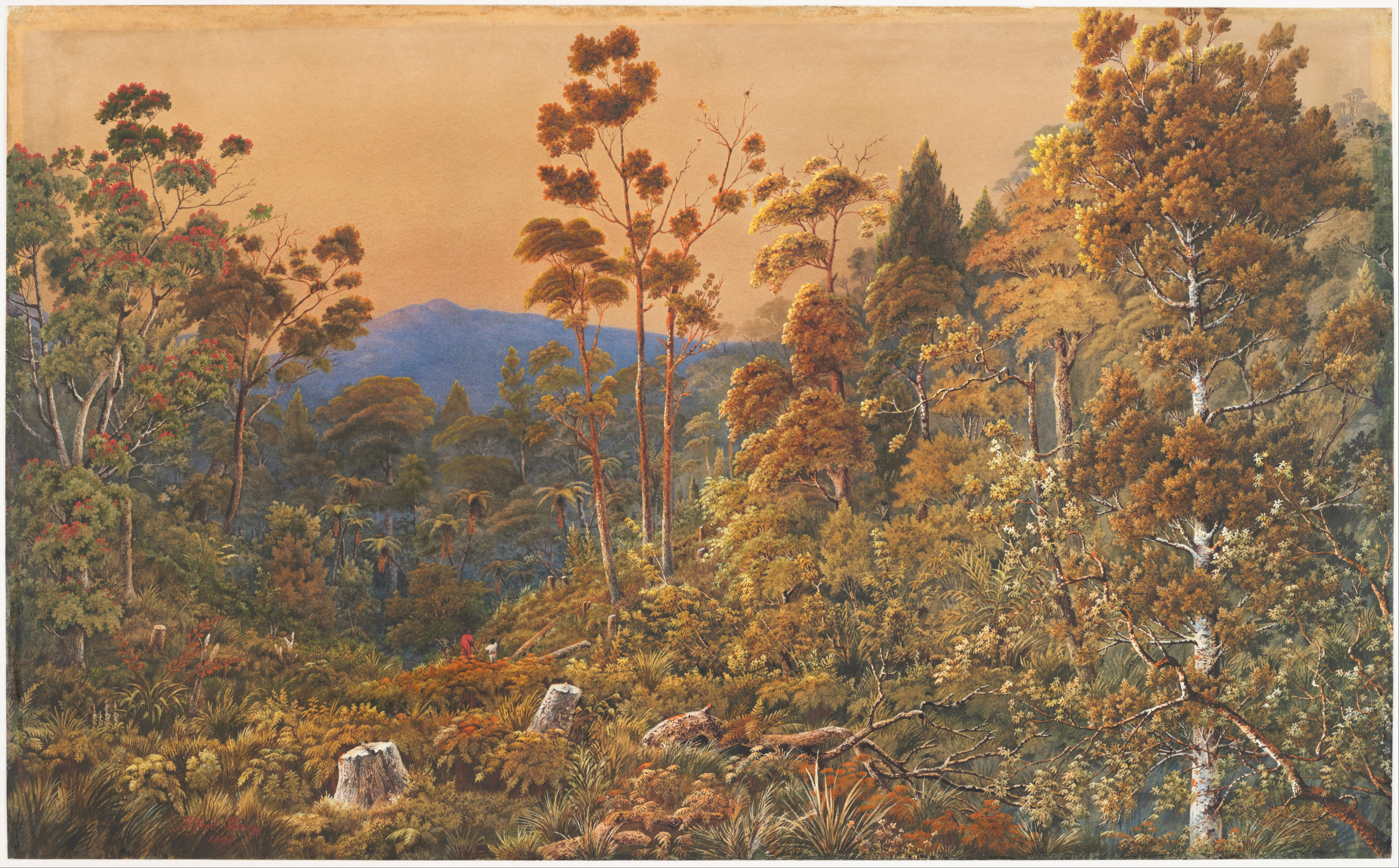
A golden eve, Waiheke Island (1890), painting by Alfred Sharpe, in the Museum of New Zealand Te Papa Tongarewa

The islands of the Hauraki Gulf have been settled since the archaic period of Māori history, and were visited by many of the migratory canoes such as Aotea, Tākitimu, and Mātaatua. Only the largest islands such as Aotea / Great Barrier Island and Waiheke sustained permanent settlements. The forests on the western side of Waiheke Island were likely heavily damaged in the 14th century eruptions of Rangitoto Island. During 18th and early 19th centuries, the eastern side of Waiheke was forested by ancient kauri trees, while kānuka and mānuka bushes dominated the vegetation of the western side, suggesting relatively recent regeneration. The original Māori name for Waiheke was apparently Te Motu-arai-roa, 'the long sheltering island', but at the time the first European visitors arrived it was known as Motu-Wai-Heke, 'island of trickling waters' — rendered as Motu Wy Hake by James Downie, master of the store ship HMS Coromandel, in his 1820 chart of the Tamaki Strait and the Coromandel coast.

Waiheke Island has historically been settled by various tribes, especially the Marutūāhu collective tribes of Ngāti Maru and Ngāti Pāoa. Waiheke Island was the site of many battles between Ngāti Pāoa and Ngāpuhi from the Bay of Islands, up until the late 18th century. In the 1790s, sealing and whaling ships underwent repairs primarily on Waiheke Island.

The island was briefly depopulated during the Musket Wars, when Ngāti Pāoa and other Tāmaki Māori sought refuge in areas such as the Waikato. When Ngāti Pāoa returned to Tāmaki Makaurau (Auckland), they primarily settled on Waiheke. After the wars, the Ngāti Pāoa community of Waiheke were mostly based at Pūtiki Bay.

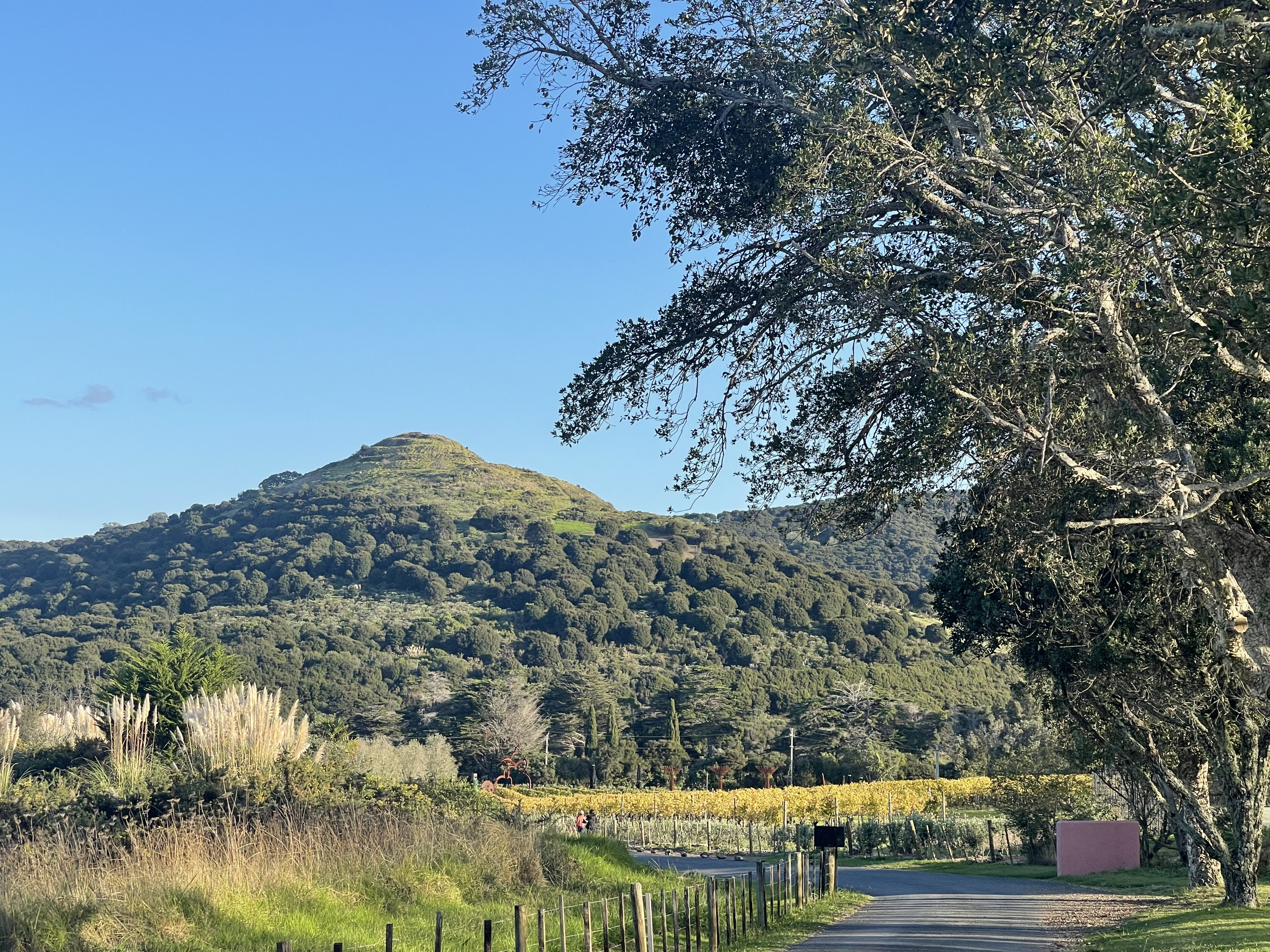
The pā site Te Pūtiki o Kahumatamomoe, aka Te Pūtiki o Kahu, photographed from the Stonyridge Vineyard on Waiheke.

In 1836, Thomas Maxwell established a shipyard at Man o'War Bay in eastern Waiheke, using local timber to build and repair ships. Ngāti Pāoa quickly engaged with the emerging industries, helping to supply timber and food for European ships. Ngāti Pāoa established wheat and vegetable plantations on the eastern bays of the island. The shipbuilding industry remained on the island until the 1860s, after which the eastern farming plantations quickly became disused. Ngāti Pāoa at Te Huruhi continued to supply produce to Auckland until the early 20th century. Much of the firewood and building timber supplied to the growing city of Auckland was supplied by Waiheke Island forests, while shingle and sand from Owhanake and Hooks Bay was used for concrete manufacturing, up until the 1920s. The island was also home to manganese mines between 1872 and 1900 (briefly first established in the 1840s).

Large private land purchases occurred on Waiheke between 1836 and 1840s, followed by large crown land purchases in the 1850s. By the 1850s, the only Ngāti Pāoa land that remained on the island was a 2,100 acre section at Te Huruhi (near the modern suburb of Blackpool). Through a process of individualisation of land titled, the Māori Land Court split the Te Huruhi block between 65 individuals, and by 1914 most of the block had been sold to private interests. By the end of the 19th century, the island was increasingly deforested, and land was increasingly used for cattle pastures.

In the late 1800s or early 1900s the island was owned by a man named Frank Bell. During Bell's ownership Waiheke was known as Bell's Island.

When shipping companies began offering occasional trips to the island in the 1880s, Waiheke emerged as a seaside resort. Day trips to Waiheke and Motutapu by steamers became a common recreational excursion, and boarding houses began to flourish at the south-eastern bays of the island. In 1915, Aucklanders were offered the chance to buy affordable land at Ostend, the first subdivision of Waiheke. The naming of these new subdivisions reveal the central role of beach life to the identity of the island. The winner of a competition naming the Surfdale subdivision was awarded a parcel of land near the beach. A section of land could be bought for a small deposit on top of a cost of 8 pence a day and was promoted as a sound investment, however, these land offers were not open to Māori.

Ostend and Surfdale were joined by additional subdivisions at Palm Beach, Rocky Bay and Oneroa in the 1920s. A level of self-sufficiency was required for life on the island as electricity only arrived in 1953 (and then only in Rocky Bay) after a submarine power cable was laid from Maraetai Point to Rocky Bay.

It took another year for the lights to go on in Onetangi. The community celebrated with a parade of floats and a party on 3 July 1954. Ostend came next, and then Palm Beach, Surfdale, Blackpool and Oneroa. Work was not complete on the more settled end of the island until October 1957. The rugged, less populated eastern end of the island took longer.

During World War II, three gun emplacements were built at Stony Batter on the eastern edge to protect Allied shipping in Waitematā Harbour, in the fear that Japanese ships might reach New Zealand. This mirrored developments at North Head and Rangitoto Island. The guns were never fired in anger. The empty emplacements can be visited seven days a week. The extensive tunnels below them have also opened as a tourist attraction.

In 1999 Waiheke's community board voted Waiheke as a "genetic engineering free zone", but this is a matter of principle rather than fact, as only national government controls exist over genetically engineered foods and grains.

== Demographics ==
=== Population ===
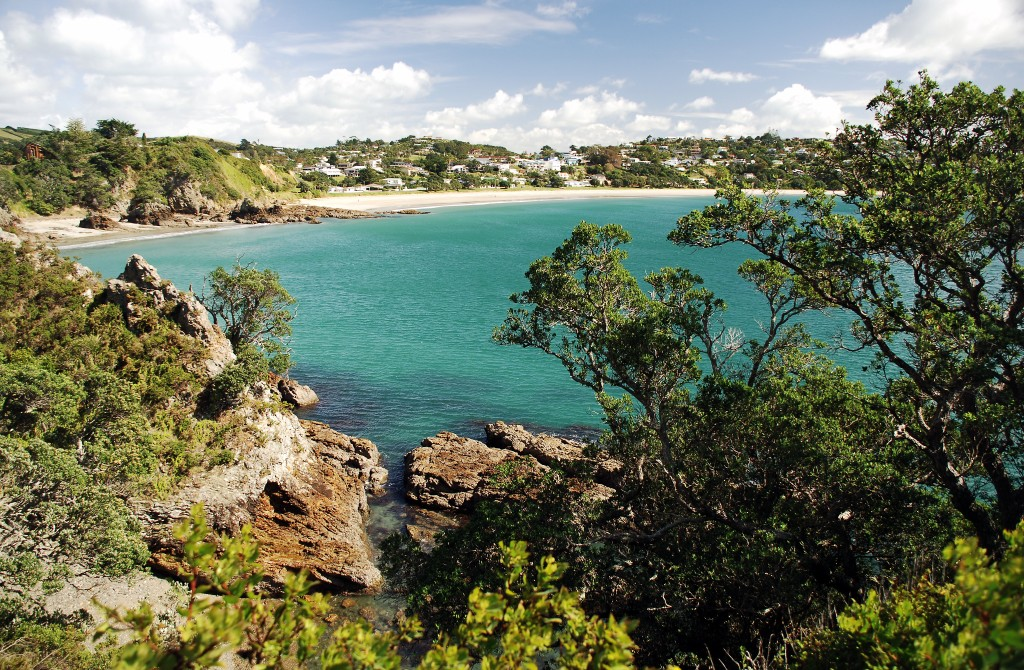
Oneroa Beach showing some of the settlements

Waiheke Island SA3 statistical area, which also includes the smaller islands of the Hauraki Gulf, such as Ponui Island, Pakihi Island and Rotoroa Island, none of which have a substantial population, covers 112.17 km^{2} (43.31 sq mi). It had an estimated population of 9,310 as of June 2025, with a population density of 83 people per km^{2}.

Most people live close to the western end, or near the isthmus between Huruhi Bay and Oneroa Bay, which at its narrowest is only 600 metres (2,000 feet) wide. The settlements of Oneroa and Blackpool are the furthest west, followed by Palm Beach, Surfdale, and Ostend. Further east lies Onetangi, on the northern coast of the wide Onetangi Bay. To the south of this on the opposing coast is Whakanewha Regional Park, Whakanewha, and Ōmiha (also called 'Rocky Bay'). Much of the eastern half of the island is privately owned farmland and vineyards, with a small settlement at Orapiu.

Waiheke is a popular holiday spot, and during the main summer season, especially around Christmas and Easter, its population increases substantially due to the number of holiday homes being rented out, corporate functions and dance parties at vineyards and restaurants, the Wine Festival and the Jazz Festival and weekend trippers from around the country and the world. The population increases significantly, almost all homes and baches are full and a festive atmosphere exists.

A downside of tourism is that short-term "Airbnb" type-accommodation is said to be causing a shortage of homes available for locals to rent on a long-term basis, leading to a housing crisis. Some have suggested this has been caused by overseas residents returning to their homes as a result of the COVID-19 pandemic and other international pressures. The island has the fourth highest homeless population of any local board in the Auckland region, despite having one of the lowest overall populations. While the number of homeless people per capita is high, over a third of the island's houses are unoccupied, because they are consented as short-term visitor accommodation and not long-term housing. There are more than 250 Visitor Accommodation Units (VAUs). This situation has led to growing calls for changes to the local rental regulations to be introduced.

=== Social composition ===
Historical population
Year	Pop.	±% p.a.
2006	7,716	—
2013	8,259	+0.98%
2018	9,033	+1.81%
2023	9,093	+0.13%

Waiheke Island SA3 statistical area had a population of 9,093 in the 2023 New Zealand census, an increase of 60 people (0.7%) since the 2018 census, and an increase of 834 people (10.1%) since the 2013 census. There were 4,473 males, 4,578 females and 42 people of other genders in 3,837 dwellings. 6.3% of people identified as LGBTIQ+. The median age was 48.9 years (compared with 38.1 years nationally). There were 1,188 people (13.1%) aged under 15 years, 1,188 (13.1%) aged 15 to 29, 4,533 (49.9%) aged 30 to 64, and 2,184 (24.0%) aged 65 or older.

People could identify as more than one ethnicity. The results were 87.9% European (Pākehā); 12.3% Māori; 5.2% Middle Eastern, Latin American and African New Zealanders (MELAA); 4.6% Asian; 3.6% Pasifika; and 2.1% other, which includes people giving their ethnicity as "New Zealander". English was spoken by 97.8%, Māori language by 3.2%, Samoan by 0.4%, and other languages by 16.6%. No language could be spoken by 1.2% (e.g. too young to talk). New Zealand Sign Language was known by 0.4%. The percentage of people born overseas was 33.8%, compared with 28.8% nationally.

Religious affiliations were 20.6% Christian, 1.1% Buddhist, 0.8% New Age, 0.7% Māori religious beliefs, 0.5% Hindu, 0.3% Jewish, 0.1% Islam, and 1.7% other religions. People who answered that they had no religion were 67.6%, and 6.9% of people did not answer the census question.

Of those at least 15 years old, 2,619 (33.1%) people had a bachelor's or higher degree, 3,501 (44.3%) had a post-high school certificate or diploma, and 1,782 (22.5%) people exclusively held high school qualifications. The median income was $39,000, compared with $41,500 nationally. 1,206 people (15.3%) earned over $100,000 compared to 12.1% nationally. The employment status of those at least 15 was that 3,615 (45.7%) were employed full-time, 1,425 (18.0%) were part-time, and 153 (1.9%) were unemployed.

Individual SA2 statistical areas
Name	Area (km^{2})	Population	Density (per km^{2})	Dwellings	Median age	Median income
Oneroa West	8.42	1,344	160	660	53.1 years	$39,300
Oneroa East-Palm Beach	3.67	1,242	338	543	51.2 years	$41,100
Surfdale	2.61	2,058	789	795	44.7 years	$41,100
Ostend	3.91	1,983	507	774	46.2 years	$35,600
Onetangi	5.96	1,368	230	579	48.4 years	$41,100
Waiheke East	87.58	1,092	12	486	51.6 years	$39,200
New Zealand					38.1 years	$41,500

== Governance ==
The Waiheke Road District was formed 26 September 1867 but no road board was ever formed to administer this area. In 1921 the Orapiu and Ostend road districts were formed. In 1946 Ostend was renamed Western Waiheke and enlarged. Orapiu and Western Waiheke were merged in 1955 to become the Waiheke Road District, which was dissolved 1 April 1970 when Waiheke County was formed to replace it.

=== Amalgamation with Auckland City, later Auckland Council ===
In 1989 Waiheke County Council was amalgamated with Auckland City Council as part of Local Government restructuring of that year.

In 1990 the Waiheke Community Board formally requested the right to de-amalgamate from the city. A 'De-amalgamation Committee' was established by Council to facilitate the Board's wish. However, this proved not to be to the liking of most of Auckland's citizens. In 1991, the city responded to a campaign run by a pro-union group, the Waiheke Island Residents & Ratepayers Association (Inc) by holding a democratic referendum. The de-amalgamation proposal sponsored by the Community Board was defeated.

In 2008, the Royal Commission on Auckland Governance received 3,080 submissions (from a population of 1.2 million), 737 of which were made by Waihekeans (population 8,500), almost 1/4 of all submissions. A public meeting of 150 residents on 29 March 2008 found a majority in favour of breaking away from Auckland City. The Royal Commission recommended that Waiheke Island retain its community board with enhanced powers. When Auckland Council was created in 2010 by amalgamating seven councils and territorial authorities and Auckland Regional Council, Waiheke was given its own local board.

The Waiheke Local Board was elected in the October 2010 Auckland local elections as part of the Auckland Council.

The 2010 local elections resulted in Waiheke resident Mike Lee becoming the Councillor for the Waitemata and Gulf ward. Denise Roche, Faye Storer, Jo Holmes, Don McKenzie and Jim Hannan were elected to the new Local Board. After Roche's resignation after becoming a Member of Parliament for the Green Party of New Zealand in 2011, Paul Walden was elected in a by-election.

In 2013 Lee was re-elected. Paul Walden was re-elected to the Local Board, joined by Beatle Treadwell, Becs Ballard, John Meeuwsen and Shirin Brown.

In 2016, Lee was re-elected. Paul Walden, Shirin Brown and John Meeuwsen were re-elected to the Local Board. Newly elected were Cath Handley and Bob Upchurch.

In 2015–16, the subject of amalgamation remained a hot topic on the island with an application filed with the Local Government Commission from a group called Our Waiheke for a unitary authority.

== Lifestyle ==
Waiheke's lifestyle is largely influenced by the fact that it is surrounded by water – there are a number of beaches mentioned above, that are popular for a wide range of activities such as kite surfing, kayaking, stand-up-paddle boarding, boating, swimming and other typical beach pursuits.

=== Arts and culture ===
Waiheke has a community-run cinema, a theatre that hosts a number of regular musicians, performances and local productions, and a library that was rebuilt in 2014 at the cost of $6 million. Waiheke Library is a major part of the learning and art side of the island. The Architect is Phillip Howard with his team at Pacific Environment NZ Ltd There are a large number of art galleries run by private individuals across the island, along with a community art gallery established in 1995.

Waiheke has become internationally known for the biennial exhibition Sculpture on the Gulf, an "outdoor sculpture exhibition set on a spectacular coastal walkway on Waiheke Island in Auckland's Hauraki Gulf". It takes place towards the end of January until approximately mid-March every second year. It was listed by the New York Times as number 35 in its list of 46 must-see places and events of 2013. The sculpture walk attracts thousands of visitors to Waiheke; in 2013, there were more than 30,000 attendees.

=== Sports ===
Waiheke has a number of sports teams and facilities on the island. Rugby union, cricket, rugby league, football and netball are widely played and followed.

There are three main sports facilities on the island:

- Onetangi Sports Park: surrounded by the Whakanewha Regional Park several vineyards and the Waiheke golf course lies the idyllic setting for the Onetangi Sports Park. It is home to multiple sports groups such as the Waiheke Tennis club, Waiheke United AFC, Waiheke Rugby, Waiheke Cricket, Waiheke Mountain Bike Club and an 18-hole Frisbee (Disc) Golf course.
- Ostend Sports Park: located in the centre of the urban area, it is home to the Waiheke Rams rugby club and the Waiheke Dolphins netball teams.
- The Waiheke Recreation Centre: a large indoor multi-sports facility that is used by the High School during term time (days) and at nights and weekends offers a wide range of activities such as badminton, basketball, gymnastics, martial arts and other activities.

== Education ==
Waiheke Island has two primary schools and one secondary school. It is the only island in New Zealand, other than the North and South Islands, with a secondary school.

In 2016, the New Zealand Government Education Minister announced a $40 million school rebuild project for Waiheke. This was made up of two project announcements: $23 million to Te Huruhi School rebuild project to provide three new blocks with 22 new teaching spaces, a new administration area and library and targeted repairs to the existing school hall; and $17m was awarded to the Waiheke High School redevelopment project to build 10 new teaching spaces and improvement to existing facilities.

Both rebuild project were started in 2019 with an expected completion date of late 2019 / early 2020.

- Te Huruhi Primary School is a state contributing primary (Year 1–6) school in Surfdale, and has 239 students. It opened in 1986 following the split of Waiheke Area School.
- Waiheke Primary School is a state full primary (Year 1–8) school in Ostend, and has 274 students. It opened in 2005.
- Waiheke High School is a state Year 7–13 secondary school in Surfdale, and has 387 students. It opened in 1986 following the split of Waiheke Area School.

== Transport ==
=== Ferry ===
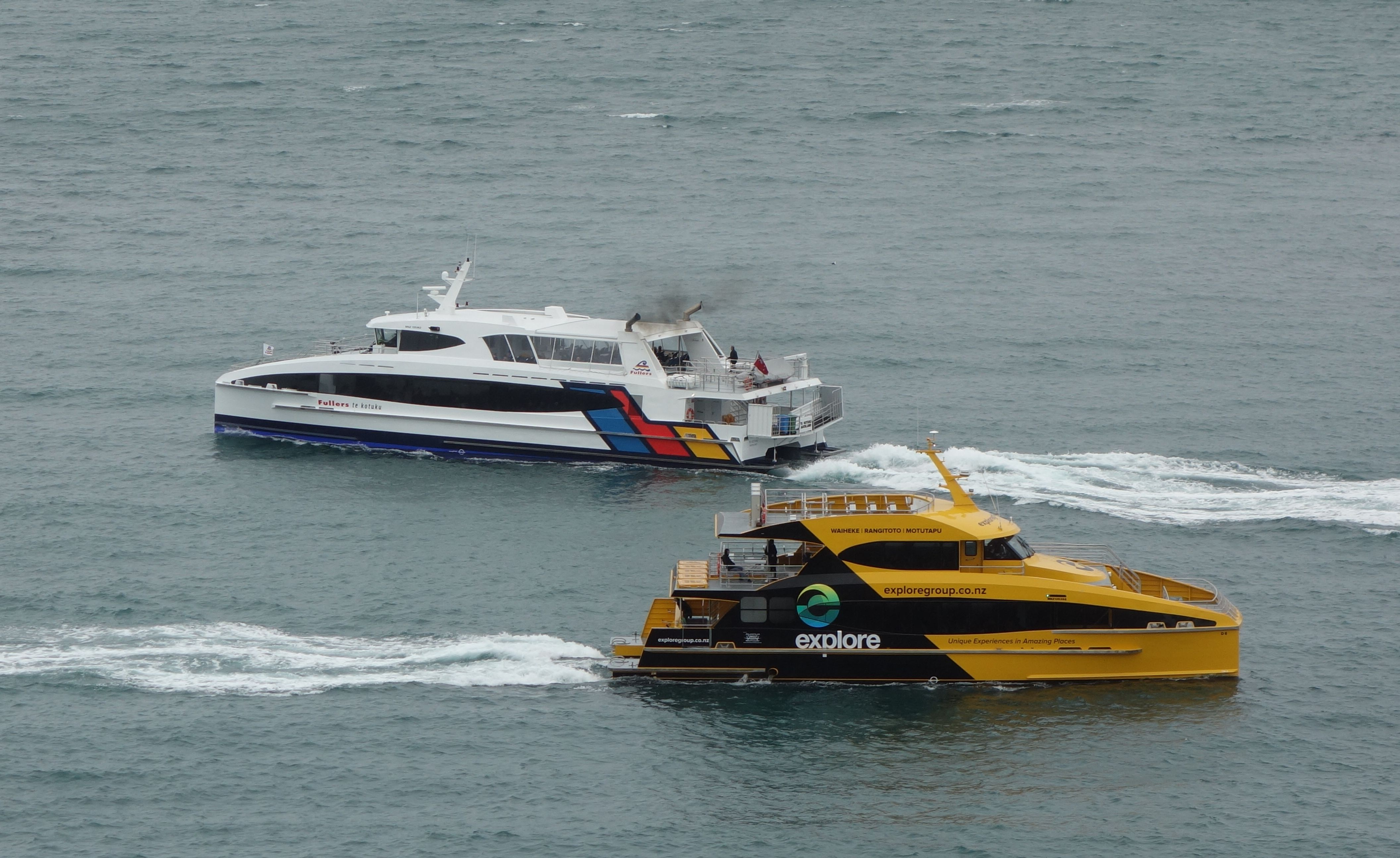
Fullers and (now defunct) Explore Waiheke services, crossing paths in July 2015

The ferry Baroona, built in Australia in 1904, was the main way to get to the island from the mainland for much of the twentieth century and was known for being a slow and noisy ferry. In 1987, the first of a fleet of new catamaran ferries began to provide more efficient access to and from the island. The 40 minute journey each way made a daily commute more viable.

Scheduled ferry services regularly sail to and from Waiheke.

George Hudson bought Leo Dromgoole's Waiheke Shipping Company and its fleet of wooden vessels including Kestrel, Baroona and Iris Moana in 1981.

Hudson's company has operated a passenger service to Waiheke since 1987, under the name Fullers. The company is now owned by the Scottish businessman Sir Brian Souter.

For 18 months, Explore Group ran ferries to Waiheke, but found it difficult to compete against Fullers. The last Explore service was in May 2016.

There are currently two non-governmental, commercially owned operators providing daily passenger only services from Downtown Auckland to Waiheke's Matiatia wharf: the first is the long-standing Fullers, with trips taking approximately 40 minutes, or around 50 minutes when the service calls at Devonport; and the second is the relative newcomer Island Direct, who offer a slightly less frequent, smaller, family-run business alternative

Meanwhile, SeaLink - also a non-governmental, commercially owned but publicly listed company - provides passenger, car and freight services between Half Moon Bay in East Auckland and Waiheke's Kennedy Point, with trips taking around 50 minutes to an hour. SeaLink also offer a passenger and car "City Service" connecting Kennedy Point with Auckland's Wynyard Quarter.

In recent years, there has been significant controversy with many of Waiheke's resident population who rely on the ferries "like buses" – and especially those who commute daily to work in Auckland – complaining of poor parking arrangements at Matiatia, unfair price increases and generally poor ferry services. This led to the launch of a Ferry User's Group (or FUG) and a "Fuller's Watch" group, with the objective of giving a voice to the island's ferry passengers whilst lobbying local politicians and working with the ferry companies to improve the overall experience.

More recently, there have been moves to try to incorporate the privately owned, commercial ferry businesses into the Auckland Transport Regional Public Transport Plan (AT RPTP), most recently in 2022 when public and political pressure grew as a result of ferry price rises. The integration into the AT RPTP would afford closer regulation and fare subsidies, however Fullers Group have managed to resist any change and continues to receive an exemption from the AT RPTP. In 2023 a detailed Waka Kotahi report was published that examined the business case for the removal of the special exemption, however, while the report found there was a "strong case for changing the status" it ultimately fell short of pushing for change

=== Buses ===
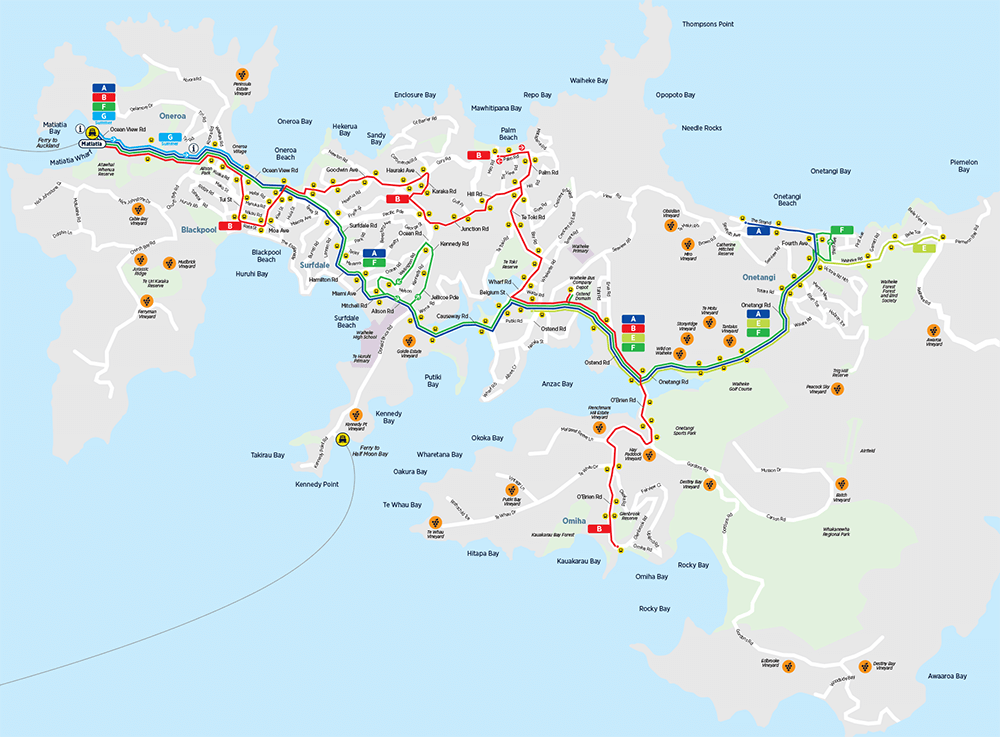
Waiheke Bus Map

Waiheke has a reliable and fully timetabled public bus service (pdf) which is operated by Waiheke Bus Company (owned by Fullers), and overseen by Auckland Transport.

There are five routes operating in a new network from October 2019. Most routes operate to and from the ferry terminal at Matiatia and span outwards across the island towards Palm Beach, Ostend, Rocky Bay and out to Onetangi Beach. There are no public bus routes towards the Eastern end of the island.

- 50A – Onetangi Beach West, Ostend, Surfdale, Oneroa, Matiatia Ferry Terminal
- 50B – Onetangi Beach East, Ostend, Surfdale (Jellicoe Parade, Wellington Road), Oneroa, Matiatia Ferry Terminal
- 501 – Kennedy Point Wharf to Matiatia Ferry Terminal
- 502 – Ōmiha (Rocky Bay), Ostend, Palm Beach, Blackpool, Oneroa, Matiatia Ferry Terminal
- 503 – Matiatia Ferry Terminal to Oneroa (one-way summer service)

As the island is within one fare zone, fares are flat, regardless of journey length.

In July 2019, it was announced that Waiheke will get a fleet of electric buses on the island. This will start with six new electric buses in mid-2020, with an additional five to arrive later.

=== Air service ===
There is one airport on the island, Waiheke Island Aerodrome. Waiheke is also accessible via a regular seaplane service.

== Infrastructure ==
The island has less infrastructure than mainland Auckland.

Roads: The roads are mainly narrow and in many places unsealed and unlit, especially on the eastern half of the island. Except for the Onetangi Straight (60 km/h) and the rural eastern end, the island speed limit is 50 km/h, and many of the roads see traffic travelling at well under the limit due to their size. At the car ferry terminal at Kennedy Point, the highway department has posted a sign saying "Slow Down, You're here", which delivers the message to visitors about island life.

Transport: Primary transportation on the island is by privately owned used car, motorbike or car-rental for visitors. The Waiheke Bus Company (owned by Fullers) services most inhabited parts of the island, linking to the ferry sailings from Matiatia and Kennedy Point. Numerous other taxi, shuttle, bus and boutique tour services cater to visitors. Due to the hills, bicycling on the island tends to be more limited, but there is also an active mountain bike group (WMBC). ebikes continue to rise in popularity, with at least two ebike rental companies operating on the island - one located at Matiatia wharf. ebikes are increasingly popular with day-trippers and holiday makers who wish to bike around the various sightseeing locations, vineyards and beaches. ebikes are also now a common sight on the ferries to the mainland as more commuters opt for ebike transport to their city working location. Being an island, many people also own small boats and these are visible in multiple harbours, and anchorages around the built up areas. Walking continues to be a popular means of island transport, both for access and recreation with many walking trails that are not along roads. Horse is popular for recreation rather than transport, but the island does support both a pony club and an adult riding club.

Power: Waiheke is connected to the North Island's electricity network via twin 33 kV undersea cables from Maraetai on the mainland, terminating on the island at a 33/11 kV substation in Ostend. The island's electricity network is operated by Auckland-based lines company Vector.

Water and waste water: Each house must maintain its own water supply, most collecting rainwater in cisterns. Water delivery is available and tends to be very active during dry summers. Except for the Oneroa sewage district which discharges into the Owhanake Treatment plant, each residence and relevant commercial establishments must install a septic tank and septic field to handle sewage. This is a requirement in every building consent.

Internet: The fibre optic cable that runs from a bay on the southern side of the island connects it to the internet. Internet services were provided using VDSL and ADSL until central government introduced a national fibre optic rollout that included urban parts of Waiheke. Central government also forced the separation of the cable infrastructure from the ISPs, with the fibre backbone being maintained by Chorus which has contracts with numerous ISPs. The locally owned WISP continues to provided wireless internet and some islanders use both services to ensure system redundancy.

Solid Waste: The community established a charitable trust which successfully tendered for Auckland City's contract for solid waste disposal. The recycling centre was implemented with such success that it soon had to be expanded to handle the volume. However, when the contract term expired in 2009, the Council voted to disqualify incumbent tenderer Clean Stream Waiheke Ltd and granted Transpacific Industries Group Ltd a $22 million contract. The decision was political.

Emergency Services: The Waiheke Volunteer Fire Brigade, part of the New Zealand Fire Service, serves the island. The brigade has two stations, at Oneroa and at Onetangi.

Media: The island has a lively press, with the long-established, independently owned weekly Waiheke Gulf News and until recently the Fairfax Media owned Waiheke Marketplace which closed down in 2018. A community radio station, Waiheke Radio, is broadcasting on 88.3 FM and 107.4 FM after Beach FM lost its licence in a commercial bid in 2008.

=== Matiatia redevelopment ===
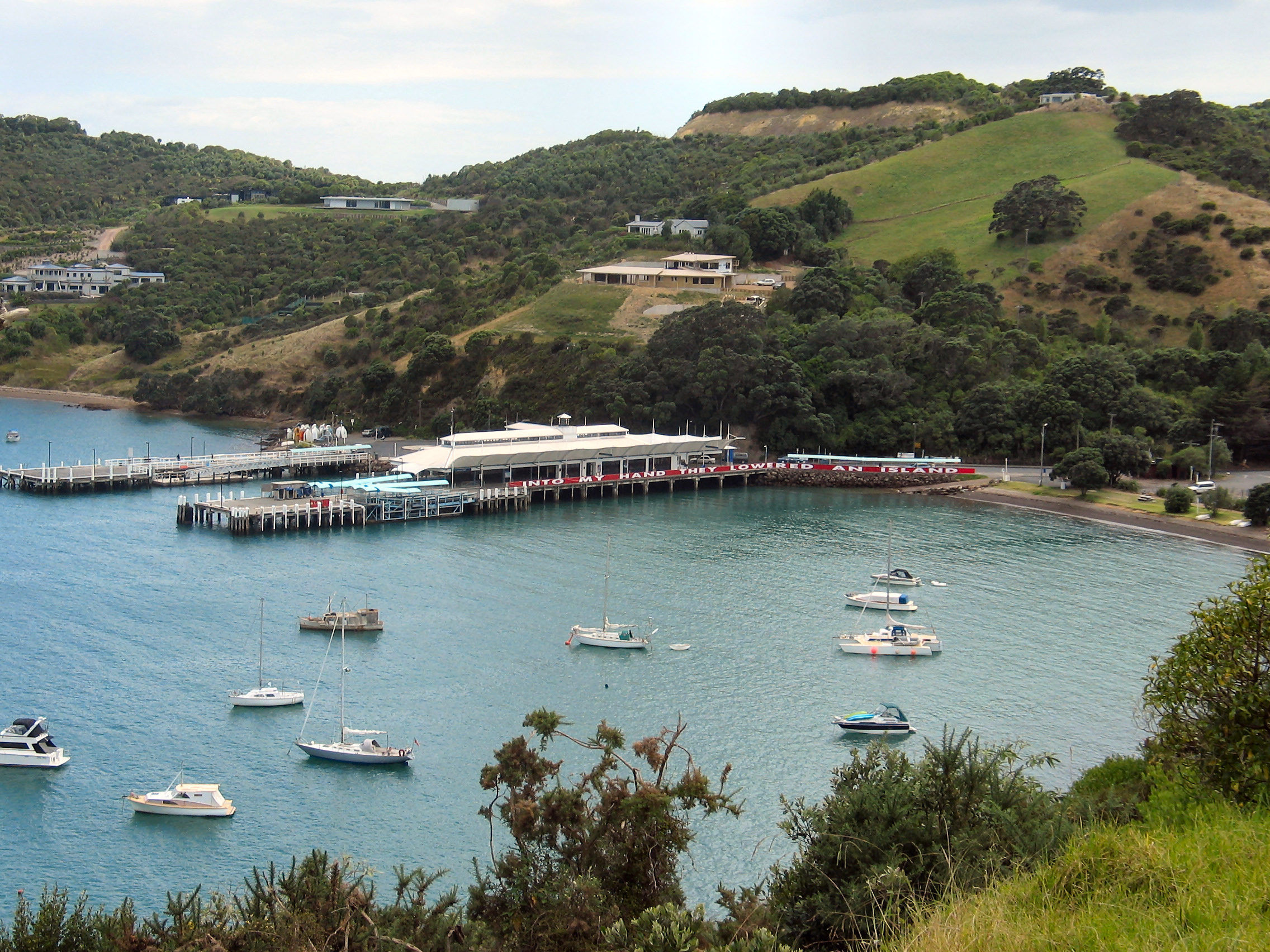
The ferry terminal at Matiatia

The gateway to Waiheke, where the main pedestrian ferry lands over one million passengers per year, is a valley and harbour called Matiatia. In 2000 it was purchased by three investors in Waitemata Infrastructure Ltd (WIL). In 2002 WIL proposed to change the Operative District Plan rules for their land to build a major shopping and hotel complex with 29,000 m^{2} (312,153 sq ft) of gross floor area on buildable land of approximately 3 hectares. This united the residents of the island in opposition. Over 1,500 adult residents of the island (out of perhaps 3,000) joined in an incorporated society, the Community and People of Waiheke Island (CAPOW), to oppose the private plan change in court. Church Bay resident and former newsreader John Hawkesby became "the voice of the campaign" that included a showdown with then mayor, John Banks, when Hawkesby made a deputation to the city council hours after the press revealed that Banks was in business with two (of three) directors of WIL.

In 2004, they won an interlocutory judgement in which the environment court ruled that Auckland City Council had erred in the rules, and the current rules limited controlled development to 5,000 m^{2} (53,820 sq ft) in what was called the Visitor Facility Precinct. In 2005, CAPOW won an interim judgement by the court which reduced the proposed redevelopment to about a third of what the investors had originally sought. (Note: See Decision A-055-2005.)

This set the stage for confidential negotiations between Auckland's mayor Dick Hubbard and the investors, who on 31 August 2005 (now known as 'Matiatia Day' on the island) sold the stock in WIL to the city for $12.5 million. The unanimous vote on 30 June 2005 of the City Council to approve the purchase was said to have come about because of the unity of the people of Waiheke Island. The court case finally was concluded with permitted development set at 10,000 m2 of mixed use gross floor development. The Court also found Auckland City Council and WIL liable for costs in relationship to the interlocutory judgement. Since WIL was now owned by Council, it had to write a cheque to CAPOW for $18,000, representing 75% of CAPOW's costs on that matter. This final cheque allowed CAPOW to pay all its debts and balance its books.

The Council organised a design competition in 2006 to find a suitable development plan and project for the Matiatia gateway. The competition winner's design (scheme 201) was available for comment on the Council website. It attracted much criticism for the lack of car parking close to the ferry terminal, the transport hub function used by all islanders regularly and almost daily by around 850 commuters to Auckland.

In 2013, Matiatia again became a hotspot for controversy as a group of residents proposes a private marina at the terminal. Some of the veterans of the protests a decade prior (led by local resident, retired newsreader John Hawkesby), re-emerged to oppose. The Environment Court decided in favour of the residents.

In 2023 a new controversial marina opened at Kennedy Point, despite years of resource and environmental court wranglings

== Wine ==
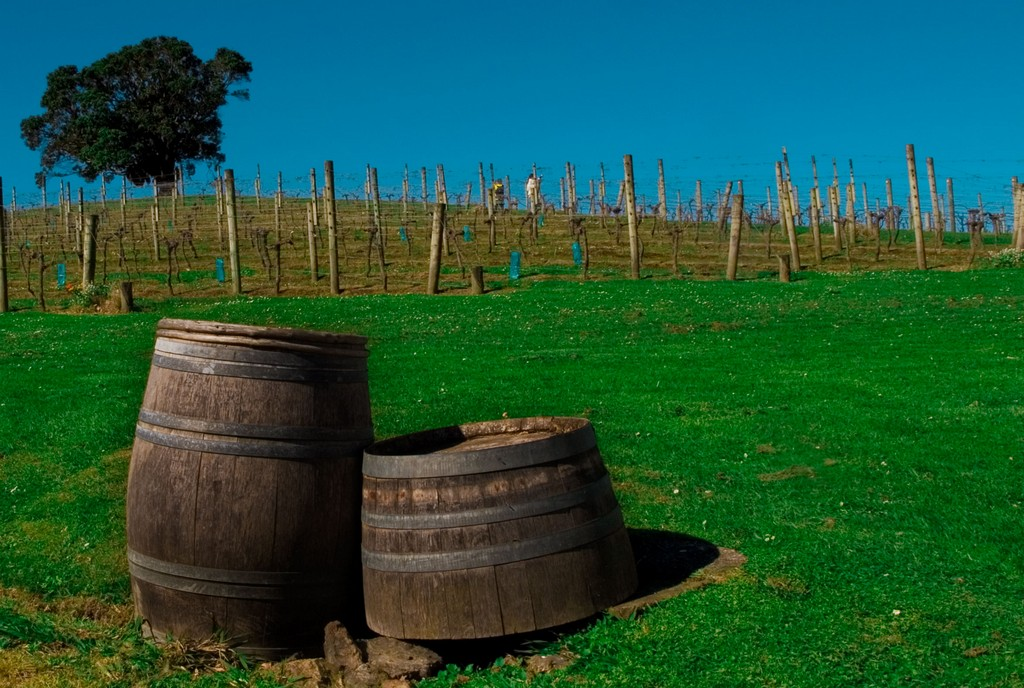
Goldwater vineyard

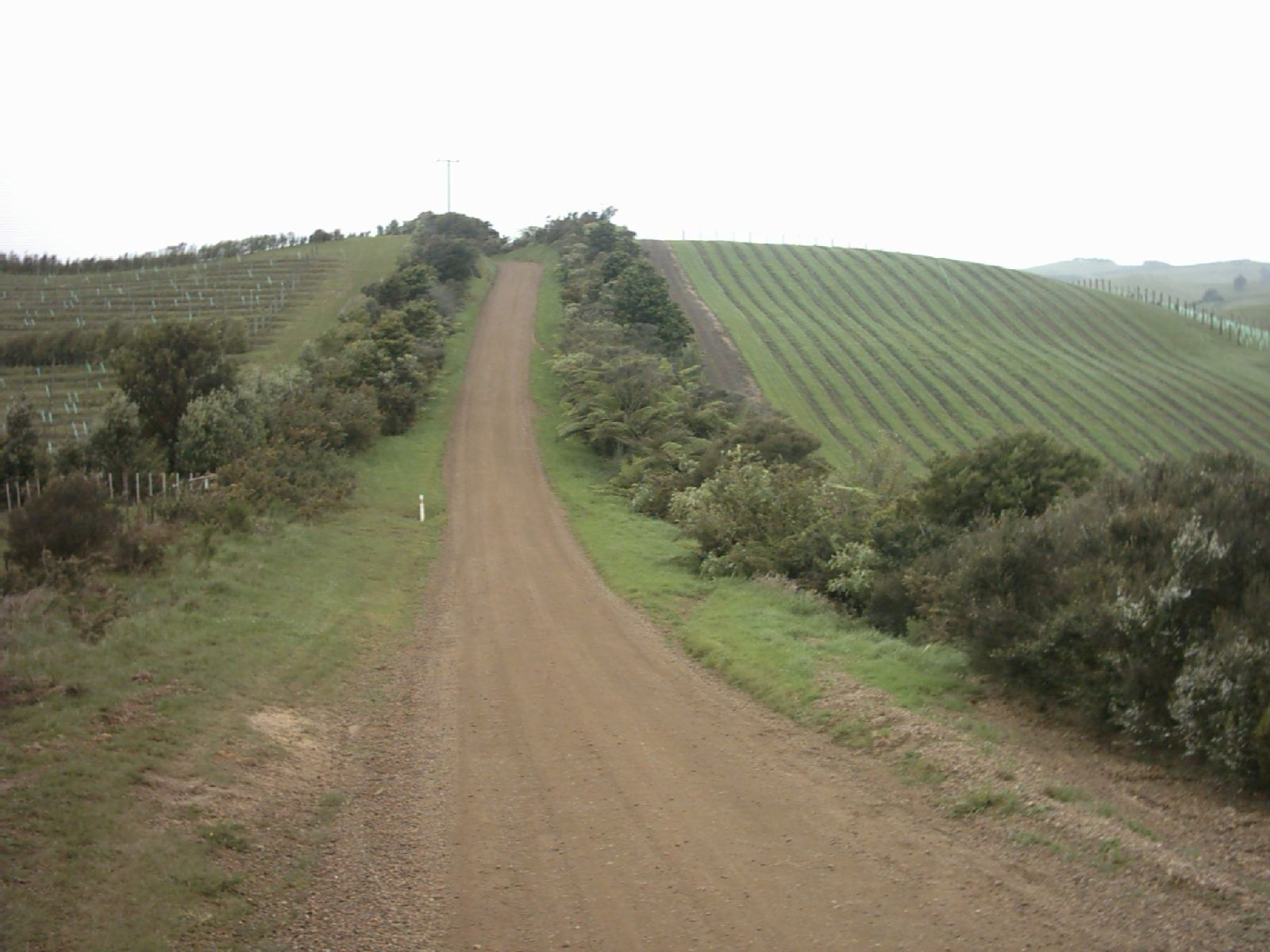
Vineyards near Stony Batter. Unlike the settled western part of the island, the eastern half is mostly agricultural.

Waiheke has become known as New Zealand's "island of wine", home to a dedicated group of winegrowers who have successfully matched the maritime climate and ancient soil structures to the selection of classical grape varieties to produce red and white wines with distinctive varietal character. The climate is well-suited to growing Bordeaux-type grapes, though some Chardonnay and Sauvignon blanc varieties are also considered to be good. Waiheke winegrowers regularly win awards for Syrah (Kennedy Point's 2007 Syrah won best Syrah in the world in 2009), proving the island's terroir suits the variety well. Wines produced on Waiheke are relatively expensive because of the limited size of many of the island's vineyards.

Among the vineyards and wineries on Waiheke Island are:

- Awaroa Vineyard – The organic Awaroa vineyards lie on west-facing slopes among native bush in the middle of Waiheke Island. Syrah and Cabernet Sauvignon are the main varieties planted.
- Batch Winery – Waiheke's newest hi tech winery production is located at the highest vineyard with views from Coromandel to the Sky Tower. Batch wine portfolio includes Flora, Pinot Gris, Cabernet Sauvignon and Syrah. Batch Fizz sparkling wine, made and bottled on site, range includes Fizz Rose, Fizz Chardonnay and Fizz Riesling.
- Cable Bay Vineyards – Cable Bay Vineyards makes wines from grapes grown on Waiheke Island and in Marlborough. Varieties grown include Gewürztraminer, Sauvignon blanc, Pinot noir, Chardonnay, Five Hills Merlot/Malbec/Cabernet and Rosé.
- Destiny Bay Vineyards – Destiny Bay is Waiheke Island's only Cabernet blend specialist and first fully certified sustainable winery. The 2007 Magna Praemia is New Zealand's highest rated wine by an international critic, and received 98/100 points by Anthony Dias Blue. Magna Praemia is New Zealand's most expensive wine.
- Edbrooke Vineyard – Jeremy Edbrooke has over 7 acres (28,000 m^{2}) planted in Merlot, Cabernet Franc, Chardonnay and Pinot gris grapes which are supplied to Waiheke Island's Passage Rock Wines.
- Eventide Vineyard – Eventide is a boutique vineyard producing an annual Syrah. The vineyard was planted in 2012 and sits atop one of the highest points on Waiheke. It is located next to EcoZip – a commercial flying fox. Visitors to ecozip can "fly" over the Eventide vines and down through 15 acres of spectacular native (Podocarp) rainforest that is jointly managed by the two enterprises
- Fenton Estate – First planted in 1989, Fenton Twin Bays Vineyard is a north-facing property that spans two small bays separated by a peninsula.
- Goldwater Estate – Begun by pioneering Waiheke winemakers Kim and Jeanette Goldwater, Goldwater Estate was among the first wine making operations on Waiheke. Its awards include being named winery of the year by Wines and Spirits Magazine in 2001.
- Jurassic Ridge – Jurassic Ridge is a small, family-owned vineyard and winery, named for the surrounding geology. It produces hand-crafted Syrah, Montepulciano, Pinot gris and Cabernet Franc. Jurassic greywacke is a major feature of the terroir.
- Kennedy Point Vineyard – Kennedy Point Vineyard is the only certified organic vineyard on Waiheke and can be found on the southwestern side and was established in 1996. It specialises in growing and producing Bordeaux and Syrah wines.
- Man O' War – Situated at Man O' War Bay, at the northern end of Waiheke Island, these vineyards are planted on numerous small sites on the 5,000-acre (20 km^{2}) Man o'War farm.
- Miro Vineyard – Miro Vineyard produces two wines, both red Bordeaux blends. The vineyard overlooks the ocean at Onetangi Beach.
- Mudbrick Vineyard – Mudbrick is one of the island's best-known wineries, and has a Provence-style restaurant made of mudbrick. The vineyard produces Merlot, Chardonnay, Cabernet Sauvignon, and Syrah grapes.
- Obsidian Vineyard – Obsidian Vineyard in Onetangi. It is a 17-hectare property established in 1993. Obsidian, its flagship wine, is a blend of Cabernet Sauvignon, Merlot, Cabernet Franc and Malbec. Its label is "Weeping Sands" (the translation of "Onetangi"). In 2007 Obsidian won a trophy and gold medal at the Romeo Bragato National Wine Competition for its first release of the Montepulciano variety.
- Passage Rock Wines – Passage Rock Vineyard is at the eastern end of Waiheke Island at the head of Te Matuku Bay. Its first vines were planted in 1994.
- Peacock Sky – Peacock Sky Vineyard is located in the centre of Waiheke Island with views across the Hauraki Gulf to Auckland.
- Peninsula Estate on Hakaimango Point was planted in 1986/87. These original plantings of Cabernet Sauvignon, Cabernet Franc, Merlot and Malbec, also now include Chardonnay and Syrah.
- Postage Stamp Wines
- Poderi Crisci Estate
- Stony Batter Estate – Stony Batter Estate, the island's largest vineyard, is at the north-eastern corner of the island
- Stonyridge Vineyard – Stonyridge was founded in 1981 in the Onetangi Valley. Specialising in Bordeaux-style reds, the vineyard's most famous wine is its Stonyridge Larose.
- Tantalus Estate
- Te Motu Vineyard – Te Motu Vineyard was established in the Onetangi Valley in 1989. The first vintage was produced in 1993.
- Te Whau Vineyard
- The Hay Paddock – This 12-acre (49,000 m^{2}), stone-walled vineyard on Seaview Road is planted in Syrah vines sourced from the Hermitage AOC region of the Rhone Valley. Cellar-aged collector wines are released under the Harvest Man and Hay Paddock labels.
- Topknot Hill Vineyard
- View East Vineyard – A boutique vineyard on the south eastern corner of Waiheke Island specialising in Syrah.
- Woodside Hill – A boutique vineyard specialising in Merlot and Cabernet Franc.

== Notable people ==
- Chris Bailey
- Zoë Bell
- Roy Billing
- Edwin Carr (composer)
- Gu Cheng
- Hinemoa Elder
- Rob Fenwick
- Soichiro Fukutake
- Murray Halberg
- Graeme Hart
- Graham Henry
- Virginia King
- Mike Lee
- Sandra Lee-Vercoe
- Peter Leitch
- Ralph Norris
- Loughlin O'Brien
- Denis O'Connor
- Eruera Maihi Patuone
- Charles Rose
- Karen Sewell

== See also ==
- List of islands of New Zealand
