= Waiheke Local Board =

Waiheke Local Board Te Poari ā-Rohe o Waiheke
- Local board of Waiheke Island
- Coordinates: 36.79536907°S 175.04542139°E
- Country: New Zealand
- Region: Auckland
- Territorial authority: Auckland
- Ward: Waitematā and Gulf Ward
- Legislated: 2010

Population (June 2025)
  - Total: 9,360

Local Board Members

Leadership
- Chairperson: Kylee Matthews
- Deputy chairperson: Damian Sycamore

Structure
- Seats: 5
- Political groups: Independents (5)
- Length of term: 3 years

Elections
- Last election: 2025
- Next election: 2028

Meeting place
- 10 Belgium Street, Ostend, Waiheke Island

The Waiheke Local Board is one of the 21 local boards of the Auckland Council. It is one of three local board areas overseen by the Waitematā and Gulf Ward councillor.

The local board area includes Waiheke Island, Rangitoto Island, Motutapu Island, Motokorea Island, Motuihe Island, Ponui Island and Rakino Island.

Kylee Matthews is the current chair of the board.

== Demographics ==
Waiheke local board covers 154.76 km^{2} (59.75 sq mi) and had an estimated population of 9,360 as of June 2025, with a population density of 60 people per km^{2}.

== 2025–2028 term ==
The board members elected at the 2025 local elections:

Name	Affiliation	Position
Kylee Matthews	Independent	Chairperson
Damian Sycamore	Independent	Deputy Chairperson
Bianca Ranson	Independent	Board member
Eric Hillman	Independent	Board member
Norm Robbins	Independent	Board member

== 2022–2025 term ==
The board members elected at the 2022 local elections:

Name	Ticket (if any)	Position
Cath Handley	Independent	Chairperson
Kylee Matthews	Independent	Deputy Chairperson
Robin Tucker	Independent	Board member
Paul Walden	Independent	Board member
Bianca Ranson	Independent	Board member

== 2019–2022 term ==
The board members elected at the 2019 Local Elections:

Name	Ticket (if any)	Position
Cath Handley	Independent	Chairperson
Kylee Matthews	Independent	Deputy Chairperson
Paul Walden	Independent	Board member
Tucker, Robin	Independent	Board member
Bob Upchurch	Independent	Board member

== 2016–2019 term ==
The board members elected at the 2016 Local Elections:

Name	Ticket (if any)	Position
Cath Handley	Independent	Chairperson
Paul Walden	Independent	Deputy Chairperson
Shirin Brown	Independent	Board member
John Meeuwsen	Independent	Board member
Bob Upchurch	Independent	Board member
