= List of defunct airlines of New Zealand =

This is a list of defunct airlines of New Zealand.

Airline	Image	IATA	ICAO	Callsign	Commenced operations	Ceased operations	Notes
A
Adastra Aviation					1966	1971	Established as Adastra in 1953. Acquired by James Aviation. Operated Cessna 185, Piper Apache
Aerial Charter (Southland)					1976	1982	Operated Piper Twin Comanche
Air Albatross					1981	1985	Operated Fairchild Swearingen Metroliner
Air Auckland			HKI	HAURAKI	2008	2023	
Air Cargo New Zealand		KC	KIC		1997	1997	
Air Central (1982)					1982	1983	Founded by Peter Matich. Established as Air Central in 1966. Merged into Eagle Airways
Air Charter Timaru					1979	1980	Renamed Air Timaru
Air Coromandel					1993	2003	Merged into Great Barrier Airlines. Operated Cessna 172, Cessna 207, GAF Nomad, BN-2 Islander
Air Direct					1993	1998	Operated Piper Aztec
Air Discovery					2005	2012	Founded by David Irvine. Operated Piper Seneca, Piper Arrow, Cessna 172, Cessna 207
Air Freight NZ		OG	AFN	AIR FREIGHT	1989	2016	
Air Hamilton					1981	1984	Founded by David Irvine. Operated Piper Seneca, Piper Arrow, Cessna 172, Beech Baron
Air Kaitaia					2000	2003	Subsidiary of Mountain Air. Operated BN-2 Islander, Piper Aztec
Air Kapiti					2002	2003	Operated Piper Chieftain
Air Marlborough					1992	1999	Founded by Allan Graham. Operated Piper Seneca, Piper Arrow, GAF Nomad
Air National			NTL	NATIONAL	1988	2011	
Air Nelson		NZ	RLK	LINK	1979	2019	Merged into parent Air New Zealand
Air North		GD			1972	1977	Merged with Akarana Air to form Nationwide Air. Operated de Havilland Heron
Air North Shore					1970s	1993	Operated Cessna 172, Cessna 206, Piper Cherokee, Partenavia P.68
Air Post			PST	POST	1990	2013	
Air Timaru					1980	1988	Established as Air Charter Timaru in 1979. Acquired by Air Safaris. Operated Piper Navajo
Air Tours Kaikoura					1997	1999	Established by the Kaikoura Aero Club. Merged with Whale Watch Air and renamed to Wings Over Whales. Operated GAF Nomad
Air Travel (NZ) Ltd					1934	1947	
Air Wairarapa					2002	2003	Operated Piper Chieftain
Air West Coast					2002	2009	
Air2there		F8	ATT	AIRTOTHERE	2004	2018	
Airland (NZ)					1963	1977	Crop dusting. Operated Douglas DC-3, Lockheed 18-56 Lodestar
Akarana Air					1972	1978	Established as Tasman Air Services in 1968. Merged with Air North to form Nationwide Air. Operated Piper Aztec
Alpine Air Services					2000	2005	Founded by Charles and Helen Thompson. Operated Piper Seneca, Cessna Skylane
Amphibian Airways					1951	1961	Merged into Ritchie Air Services. Operated Grumman Widgeon
Ansett New Zealand		ZQ	NZA	ANZA	1987	2000	
Aotearoa Airlines					1997	1997	Founded by Steve and Donna Stanaway. Operated Piper Chieftain, Cessna Stationair
Ardmore Air Charter					1984	1986	Operated Partenavia P.68, Cessna Skyhawk
Arrow Aviation					1922	1923	Founded by Maurice ‘Buck’ Buckley. Operated Avro 504K
Aspiring Air		OI		ASPIRING	1974	2015	
Associated Air					1982	1989	Founded by Harry Jenkins. Established as Associated Aviation in 1975. Renamed to Associated Airlines
Associated Air Charter					1979	1982	Founded by Harry Jenkins. Established as Associated Aviation in 1975. Renamed to Associated Air
Associated Airlines					1989	1998	Founded by Harry Jenkins. Established as Associated Aviation in 1975
Astral Air Services					1987	1991	Subsidiary of S. M. Andrews and Associates Ltd. Operated Dornier 228, Cessna Skyhawk
B
Bay of Plenty Airways					1958	1961	Founded by Alfred W. Bartlett. Established as Tauranga Air Services in 1956. Operated Cessna 182, de Havilland Dove, Aero Commander 680
Bell Air (Bell-Air Executive Air Travel)					1968	1996	Founded by Graeme Bell. Operated Aero Commander 500, Cessna 185, Cessna 207, Piper Aztec
Buckley Air					1995	1996	Operated Piper Aerostar, Partenavia P.68
C
Canterbury Aviation Company					1917	1923	Founded by Henry Wigram. Operated Caudron biplane
Capital Air					2006	2009	Renamed to Golden Bay Air
Capital Air Services		CN			1970	1978	Subsidiary of Wellington Aero Club. Renamed to James Air
Chatham Airlink					1996	1998	Operated Fairchild Metroliner
CityJet					1999	1999	
Classic Air			CLS		1986	1986	Renamed to Fieldair Freight. Operated Douglas DC-3
Coastair					1985	2013	Subsidiary of Ashburton Air Services. Operated Cessna Titan, DHC-6 Twin Otter
Coastal Airways					1958	1958	Operated De Havilland DH.89B Dominie
Cook Strait Airways					1935	1947	Subsidiary of Union Airways of New Zealand
Cookson Air					1985	1995	Founded by William Bolton Cookson. Established as Cookson Airspread in 1953
D
Dominion Airways					1929	1931	Operated Desoutter Mk.II
E
Eagle Airways		NZ	EAG	EAGLE	1969	2016	
East Air					1984	1985	Operated Piper Navajo, Partenavia P.68, Piper Chieftain
East Coast Airways					1935	1947	Subsidiary of Union Airways of New Zealand
Eastern Aviation					1996	2000	Rodger McCutcheon, built the Eastern Flight Centre FBO and started Eastern. Merged into NZ Aerial Mapping. Operated Piper Cheyenne, Cessna 421
F
Fieldair					1989	2002	Took over Speedlink Parcel. Operated Convair 580, Douglas DC-3
Fieldair Freight					1986	1993	Formed acquiring Classic Air. Operated Douglas DC-3
Flight Corporation (Flightcorp)					1991	2011	Operated Piper Aztec, Piper Seneca, Cessna 206, Cessna 172
Flight Hauraki			HKI		2008	2018	
Float Air Picton					1974	1981	Operated Lake Buccaneer, Cessna 206
Fly My Sky				ISLAND	2007	2021	
flyDirect					2010	2010	
FlyStark					2014	2018	Operated Cessna 172, GippsAero GA8 Airvan
Foxpine Air Charter					1979	1993	Operated Cessna Skyhawk, Piper Twin Comanche, Piper Seneca
Freedom Air		SJ	FOM	FREE AIR	1995	2008	Merged into parent Air New Zealand
G
Geyserland Airways					1969	1974	Operated Aero Commander 680, Cessna 185 Involved in the legal case Airways Corp of New Zealand v Geyserland Airways Ltd
Gisborne Air Transport					1931	1933	Operated Desoutter Mk.II, de Havilland DH.60 Moth
Golden Coast Airlines					1965	1970	Established as Golden Coast Airways in 1960. Operated Auster J/1B Aiglet, de Havilland Tiger Moth, Cessna 180, Piper Apache, Aero Commander 500
Goldfields Air					1985	1986	Established as Goldfields Aviation. Operated Beech Bonanza, Piper Navajo
Great Barrier Airlines					1983	2015	Renamed to Barrier Air
Great Barrier Xpress					1998	2008	Renamed to Fly My Sky. Operated BN-2 Islander, Piper Aztec
Gulf Island Air					1992	1997	Founded by George and Janet Richardson. Merged into Great Barrier Airlines. Operated Piper Cherokee, Piper Cherokee Six
H
Hercules Airlines					1985	1989	Operated Bristol Freighter
Hibiscus Air					1981	1996	Operated GAF Nomad, Piper Navajo Chieftain
I
Island Air Safaris					1984	1990	Founded by Wayne Renner, Douglas Taylor and Vernon Mills. Operated Cessna 206, DHC-2 Beaver, Cessna 188
J
James Air			VLN		1978	1983	Renamed from Capital Air Services then to Avcorp Commuter
James Air Services (James Aviation)					1949	1982	Founded by Ossie James. Renamed from Adastra Aviation. Operated de Havilland Tiger Moth, DHC-2 Beaver, Douglas DC-3, Fletcher Fu 24, Lockheed Lodestar
Jetconnect		QF	QFA	QANTAS	2002	2018	Aircraft transferred to parent Qantas
K
K2000 Airlines					1999	2000	Operated a leased Boeing 737-400
King Solomon Airways					1997	2002	Operated Convair 580
Kiwi Regional Airlines			KRL	REGIONAL	2015	2016	
Kiwi Travel Air Charters					1994	1995	Renamed to Kiwi Travel International Airlines. Operated Boeing 737
Kiwi Travel International Airlines		KC	KIC		1995	1996	
Kiwi West Aviation					1993	1995	Founded by Tony Walsh. Operated Beech Queen Air
Kiwiair					1985	1987	Operated Piper Aztec
Kiwijet					2007	2009	Never started operations
L
Lakeair					1971	1981	Founded by Ron Fincham. Established as Lakeland Aviation. Operated Partenavia P.68, Mitsubishi MU-2
M
Marshall's Air Transport					1957	1959	Founded by Noel Marshall. Operated Cessna 180
Menzies Aviation (NZ)					1990	1992	Renamed to Air National
Mercury Air Couriers					1974	1976	Founded by Allan Prince. Operated Piper Aztec
Mercury Airlines					1970	1986	Established as Mercury Bay Aero Club's in 1948. Operated de Havilland Australia DHA-3 Drover, Cessna 172, Cessna 207
Mid North Air					1983	1984	Founded by Eugene Mortensen. Operated Aero Commander 500, Cessna 172, Piper Cherokee
Midland Air Services					1968	1974	Established as Middle Districts Aero Club in 1963. Operated Piper Apache, Cessna 180, Cessna 172, Piper Cherokee
Mountain Air					1988	2021	
Motueka Air					1979	1988	Renamed to Air Nelson. Operated Piper Aztec
Motueka Air Services					1984	1987	Operated Cessna 172, Piper Aztec
Mount Cook Air Services					1954	1961	Established as NZ Aero Transport in 1920. Renamed to Mount Cook Airline. Operated Auster Autocrat, Hawker Siddeley HS 748
Mount Cook Airline		NM	NZM	MOUNTCOOK	1920	2019	Merged into parent Air New Zealand.
N
N. B. MacDonald Services					1987	1993	Founded by Neil and Josephine MacDonald. Operated Piper Seneca
Nationwide Air		GD			1978	1979	Formed by the merger of Air North and Akaran Air. Operated de Havilland Heron, Aviation Traders Carvair
Nationwide Aviation (NP) Ltd					1981	1987	Established as Nationwide Air Taxis in 1973. Operated Piper Cherokee Six, Cessna 172, Piper Aztec, Ted Smith Aerostar
New Zealand National Airways Corporation		NZ		NATIONAL	1945	1978	Merged into Air New Zealand
Newmans Air		NY	NMA	NEWMANS	1984	1987	Rebranded as Ansett New Zealand
Niue Airline		FN			1990	1992	Serviced the Auckland-Niue run
North Shore Air		NS			2015	2015	
North South Aviation					1993	1994	Operated Embraer Bandeirante
Northern Air					1995	1998	Founded by Keith Madden and Dave McAlister. Operated Cessna 177, Cessna Stationair, Partenavia P.68, GAF Nomad
Northern Commuter Airlines					1990	1998	Operated GAF Nomad, Piper Chieftain
NZ Aero Transport					1920	1954	Renamed to Mount Cook Air Services. Operated Avro 504K, De Havilland DH-9A
NZ Tourist Air Travel					1955	1968	Acquired by Mount Cook Airline. Operated Cessna 180, Cessna 206, De Havilland Dominie, Grumman Widgeon
O
Origin Pacific Airways		QO	OGN	ORIGIN	1997	2006	
Outdoor Aviation					1983	1984	Founded by Dave Phillips and Cliff Marchant. Renamed to SkyFerry. Operated Cessna 172, Cessna 185, Cessna Caravan
P
Pacific Blue Airlines		DJ	PBN	BLUEBIRD	2003	2011	Rebranded as Virgin Australia Airlines (NZ)
Pacifica Air					1987	1989	Founded by Cliff Skeggs. Operated Beech Super King Air, Fairchild Swearingen Metroliner, Piper Navajo Chieftain, Piper Aztec
Pacific Express Cargo					1992	1993	Operated leased Ilyushin Il-76.
Pasifika Air					2020	2021	Founded by Mike Pero, Never started operations
Parakai Aviation					1995	1996	Founded by Des Grant and Peter Clulow. Renamed to Trans Island Air. Operated Partenavia P.68, Cessna Skylane
Peninsula Air Travel					1963	1964	Operated Cessna 205, Cessna 172
Petersen Aviation					1957	1958	Founded by Vern Petersen and Jim Bergman. Operated Mooney M20, Cessna 172, Cessna 180
Phoenix Airways (NZ)					1961	1966	Founded by Mervin Dunn. Acquired by Golden Coast Airlines. Operated Piper Apache
Pine Air					1993	1993	Founded by Jim and Libby Lyver. Operated Piper Aztec
Pionair Adventures					1991	2014	Operated Convair 580, de Havilland Dove, Douglas DC-3
Port Hutt Air					1996	2005	Operated Beech Queen Air
Q
Qantas New Zealand					2000	2001	Operated De Havilland Canada Dash 8
Queenstown – Mount Cook Airways					1935	1940	
R
Ranger Air Cargo International					1974	1991	Operated Douglas DC-8-33
Rex Air Charter					1972	1986	Operated Cessna 402
Rex Aviation					1947	2000	Franchise with Ansett New Zealand branded as Tranzair in 1989. Operated Cessna Caravan, Embraer Bandeirante, Fokker F27 Friendship, BAe Jetstream
Ritchie Air Services					1960	1964	Founded by Ian Ritchie. Merged into NZ Tourist Air Travel. Operated Cessna 180, Cessna Super Skywagon, de Havilland Tiger Moth, de Havilland Dominie
Rotorua Aerial Charter					1967	1969	Renamed Geyersland Airways. Operated de Havilland DH.89B Dominie, Cessna 172, Aero Commander 500
Rural Aviation 1963					1963	1968	Operated Cessna AGwagon, Douglas DC-3
S
Safe Air					1966	1990	
Sea Bee Air		CB			1976	1979	Operated Grumman Widgeon, Grumman Goose
Skybus					1970s	1970s	Did not start operations
SkyFerry					1984	1991	Established as Outdoor Aviation. Operated BN-2 Islander, Trislander, Beech Queen Air, Cessna 172, Cessna 185, Cessna 206
South Island Airways					1952	1956	Division of Airwork (N.Z.) Ltd. Operated de Havilland DH.89B Dominie
South Pacific Air Charters					1995	1998	Renamed to Freedom Air International. Operated Boeing 737-300, Boeing 757
South Pacific Airlines of New Zealand (SPANZ)					1960	1966	
Southern Air (1997)					1997	2000	Established as Southern Air in 1981. Acquired by South East Air and renamed to Stewart Island Flights. Operated BN-2 Islander, Cessna 172, Cessna 177
Southern Cross Airfreighters					1962	1964	Non-scheduled cargo services. Operated Noorduyn Norseman
Southern Cross Airways					1985	1986	New Zealand airline with first female crew. Operated Cessna 421, Partenavia P.68
Southern Scenic Air Services					1948	1965	Founded by Fred Lucas and Bill Hewitt. Established as Southern Scenic Air Trips in 1947. Merged into NZ Tourist Air Travel. Operated Auster J/1B Aiglet, Auster Autocrat, Avro Anson, Percival Proctor, De Havilland DH.89B Dominie
Southern World Airlines					1990	1991	Cargo carrier. Operated Douglas DC-8
SouthFlight Aviation					1992	1986	Merged with Air Tours Kaikoura and renamed to Wings Over Whales. Operated Piper Aztec, Cessna 172, Cessna 210, BN-2 Islander, Piper Seneca
Stewart Island Air Services					1976	1981	Rebranded as Southern Air in 1981 and Southern Air (1997) in 1997. Renamed to Stewart Island Flights
Straits Air Freight Express					1950	1966	Renamed Safe Air Limited
T
Tasman Air Services					1968	1969	Operated Piper Navajo
Tasman Pacific Airlines		ZQ			2000	2001	Merged into Qantas New Zealand. Operated BAe Jetstream
Tasmanair					1969	1973	Operated Piper Navajo
Taupo Air Services					1978	1993	Founded by Peter Matich. Operated Cessna Skywagon, Cessna Cardinal, Cessna Skyhawk, Piper Super Cub
Tauranga Air Services					1978	1993	Renamed to Bay of Plenty Airways. Operated Cessna 182, de Havilland Dove, Aero Commander 680
Te Kahu Airlines					1997	1998	Operated by VIP Air with Piper Aztec, Piper Chieftain
TEAL (Tasman Empire Airways Limited)		TE		TEAL	1940	1965	Rebranded as Air New Zealand
The Hawke's Bay and East Coast Aero Club					1928	2010	Second aero club being incorporated on 12 November 1928. Operated Desoutter Mk.II, Piper Cherokee, Piper Seneca
Tikapa Air					1992	1995	Founded by Monique Van Dooren. Operated Cessna 177
Trans Island Airways					1956	1959	Operated DH.89, Beech D18S, Lockheed L.10 Electra
TranzGlobal					1994	1999	Freight carrier. Operated Embraer Bandeirante
U
Union Airways of New Zealand					1936	1947	
United Aviation					1984	1997	Founded by John Plank. Took over N. B. MacDonald Services. Operated Beech Baron, Piper Chieftain
United Pacific Airlines					1981	1988	Operated Beech King Air, Partenavia P.68
Utah Williamson Burnett					1963	1968	Operated Grumman G-73 Mallard
V
Vincent Aviation		BF	VAL	VINCENT	1990	2014	
VIP Air Charter					1991	1997	Operated Piper Aztec, Piper Navajo Chieftain
Virgin Australia Airlines (NZ)		VA	VOZ	VOZ/VELOCITY	2011	2015	
W
Waiheke Air					1986	1986	Established as Rex Air Charter in 1972
Wairarapa Airlines		2W			1981	1996	Operated Mitsubishi MU-2, Partenavia P.68, Piper Navajo Chieftain
Waterwings Airways					1983	2006	Operated Cessna 206, Cessna 207, GAF Nomad
Welair					1992	1999	Operated Cessna 182, Piper Navajo, Piper Aztec, Piper Chieftain
West Coast Airways					1956	1967	Operated de Havilland Dragon Rapide, Cessna 180, Auster Aiglet
Westland Air					1969	1973	Founded by Nash and Elisabeth Taurau. Taken over by Coast Air Charter. Operated Cessna 172, Cessna 185, AESL Airtourer, Beech Musketeer
Westland Flying Service					1976	1986	Founded by Norm Bishop and Pat Pascoe. Operated Piper Cherokee, Cessna 172, Cessna 320 Skyknight, Cessna 402
Whale Watch Air					1997	1999	Merged with Air Tours Kaikoura to form Wings Over Whales. Operated Piper Navajo

== See also ==
- List of airlines of New Zealand
- List of airports in New Zealand
