= Air National =

Airline based in Auckland, New Zealand

IATA	ICAO	Call sign
-	NTL	NATIONAL
- Founded: 1989
- Ceased operations: 2012
- Operating bases: Auckland International Airport
- Destinations: Christchurch - Hokitika, Christchurch - Blenheim, Blenheim -Wellington
- Website: www.airnational.co.nz

Air National was an airline based in Auckland, New Zealand. It operated domestic and international charter services and scheduled passenger services for Air New Zealand Link. Its main bases were Auckland International Airport

== History ==
Air National has re-branded some of its corporate jet services under the brand of JetPlus and FBO operations under SkyCare International.

In January 2011, Air National's operator's certificate was suspended by the New Zealand Civil Aviation Authority (CAA) over alleged training records irregularities . Air National appealed the decision in the High Court and the suspension was quashed pending a full investigation. The CAA appealed the high Court decision to the Court of Appeal and the lower court ruling was quashed in turn.

As of January 2012, Air National no longer operates. All aircraft are now in use by other charter operators Vincent Aviation and Airwork and the company no longer holds an Air Operator's Certificate.

In October 2014, Air National's BAe146-200 was returned from Vincent Aviation.

== Destinations ==
Air National operated scheduled services for Air New Zealand Link to the following destinations:

- Christchurch - Hokitika
- Christchurch - Blenheim
- Blenheim-Wellington

Air National also provided ad hoc airline support for Eagle Air and Air Nelson throughout their respective networks.

== Fleet ==
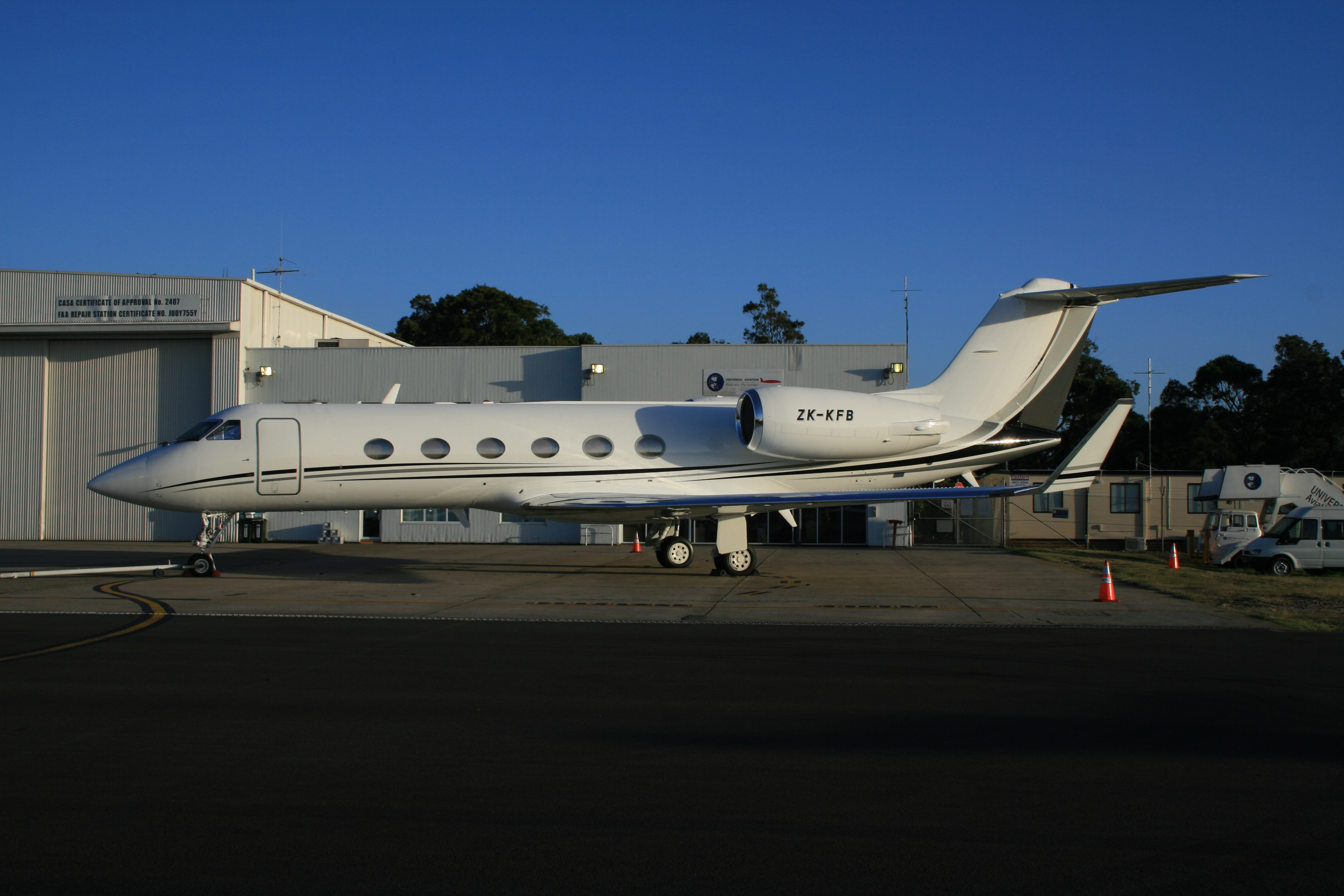
Air National's Gulfstream IV-SP at Sydney Airport in 2008

The Air National fleet consisted of the following aircraft (at November 2010):

- 4 BAe Jetstream 32EP
- 1 IAI Westwind II
- 1 Gulfstream G200
- 1 Gulfstream G-IV SP
- 1 Cessna Citation I
- 1 BAe 146-200

=== Previously operated ===
The airline also operated:

- 1 Bombardier Dash 8 Q200
- 1 BAe Jetstream 32EP

== Incidents ==
- On 8 February 2008, the pilots of Eagle Airways Flight 2279 (operated by Air National) from Blenheim to Christchurch were attacked and stabbed by a female passenger who claimed to have two bombs on board. The woman was subdued and the aircraft made a safe landing.

== See also ==
- List of defunct airlines of New Zealand
- History of aviation in New Zealand
