= Air Post =

- Founded: 15 August 1990
- Ceased operations: 30 September 2013
- Parent company: New Zealand Post and Airwork
- Headquarters: Auckland, New Zealand

Air Post was a cargo airline based in Auckland, New Zealand. It operated night postal services for New Zealand Post in a joint venture agreement with Airwork, as well as operating ad hoc charter services. Its main base was located at Auckland International Airport.

== History ==
The airline was established in 1990 and was owned by Airwork (50%) and New Zealand Post (50%). From 2007 all flights were operated solely by Airwork Ltd on behalf of New Zealand Post.

== Fleet ==
The Air Post fleet consisted of the following aircraft:

Aircraft	In fleet
Boeing 737-400SF	3

== Accidents and incidents ==
- On 27 February 2003 Fokker F27-500 Friendship registration ZK-NAN landed at Woodbourne Airport in Blenheim at the end of a training flight. After the engines were shut down the undercarriage retracted, causing major structural damage to the aircraft's belly. There were no injuries.
- On 2 May 2005 the crew of Fairchild SA227-AC Metro III ZK-POA lost control of the aircraft during a night cargo flight near the town of Stratford. As a result, the aircraft became overstressed and broke up in mid-air. Both crew members were killed.

== See also ==
- List of defunct airlines of New Zealand
- History of aviation in New Zealand
- Airwork Flight 23
