= Kiwijet =

New Zealand airline

- Kiwijet logo
IATA	ICAO	Call sign
-	-	-
- Founded: May 2007
- Commenced operations: Never commenced operations
- Headquarters: New Zealand

Kiwijet was a proposed and ultimately failed low-cost airline planned for New Zealand. It intended to be "New Zealand’s first all-jet regional airline," serving seven cities with Avro RJ-100s.

== History ==
The proposed airline, announced in May 2007, had plans to launch in November 2008.

Kiwijet's stated plans changed considerably after its initial announcement. It initially planned to operate two or more Boeing 737 aircraft on routes from Auckland to Christchurch, Dunedin and Invercargill at fares as low as $150. The airline has been accused of using information leaked by Air New Zealand employees to gain a business advantage. The company's launch was delayed by its bid to buy Jetconnect, the local subsidiary of Qantas.

In June 2007, Kiwijet issued a press release stating the deal had fallen through. Kiwijet stated that it would proceed with "plan B", which would see Embraer ERJ 145 aircraft operating between nine cities, providing a feeder service to foreign airlines without a New Zealand partner. More details of this plan were released in July, when Kiwijet announced the choice of Christchurch as a hub city, confirmed its plan to use of Embraer ERJ 145 aircraft, and changed one planned destination. In August, Kiwijet said that it was about to begin hiring chief operational staff, and that it was aiming to have seven aircraft at time of launch. In September however, a further press release announced that due to difficulties sourcing, certifying, and maintaining its desired ERJ 145 variant in New Zealand, the airline would instead aim to launch with four Avro RJ-100 aircraft, serving seven cities.

In December 2007, Kiwijet said it would open an office in February 2008 and was looking to commence flights by the end of 2008. In February 2008 the company announced it would not begin operations until February 2009. It said it was negotiating with another airline to provide "feeder traffic." Soaring aviation fuel prices during 2008 saw a decision to delay launching services until March 2009, and then indefinitely when the original backers pulled out after the severe credit crisis hit in late 2008. In October 2008 directors had resurrected the airline—following stronger backing—as a small two-aircraft (BAe 146QT type) freight airline to begin running early in 2009 as a prelude to opening passenger services later that year, citing the sudden plunge in jet fuel prices and a stronger US dollar to NZ dollar rising well above projections forecast in early 2008. Freight flights would serve as route surveys. However the global economic meltdown at the start of 2009 buried any start date and nothing has been heard from this airline since, its directors returning to the US.

In 2009, officials of Nelson Airport and Christchurch International Airport reported that there was no specific information shared between Kiwijet and airport, only that Kiwijet proposed to fly to those airports.

== See also ==
- List of defunct airlines of New Zealand
- History of aviation in New Zealand
