= VLN (disambiguation) =

VLN may refer to:

- Veranstaltergemeinschaft Langstreckenpokal Nürburgring, now known as Nürburgring Langstrecken-Serie, an organisation of German motorsport clubs hosting auto racing events on the Nürburgring-Nordschleife
- Ventral lateral nucleus, the nucleus of the thalamus
- Vancouver Learning Network, a public distance education secondary school
- Arturo Michelena International Airport, the IATA code VLN
- James Air, the ICAO code VLN
- De Vlugtlaan metro station, the station code VLN
