= K2000 =

K2000 may refer to:

- K2000 Airlines, defunct New Zealand airline
- KITT from the television program Knight Rider
- The TV movie Knight Rider 2000
- The Pentax K2000 digital single-lens reflex camera, also known as the Pentax K-M
- The Kurzweil K2000 digital synthesizer
