= Peter Vincent =

Peter Vincent may refer to:

- Peter Vincent, New Zealand businessman, founder of airline company Vincent Aviation
- Peter Vincent, a fictional character in the 1938 film Island in the Sky
- Professor Peter Vincent, a fictional character in the 1943 film Lost Angel
- Lieutenant Peter Vincent, a fictional character in the 1944 film The Purple Heart
- Peter Vincent, a fictional character in the Fright Night franchise
- Peter Vincent Douglas, American film and television producer
- Peter Vincent Music (1958–1962), a music publishing company formed by Kirk Douglas
