= Timor Air =

IATA	ICAO	Call sign
BF	ETA	—
- Founded: 2008
- Commenced operations: 2011
- Ceased operations: 2012
- Hubs: Presidente Nicolau Lobato International Airport
- Secondary hubs: Darwin International Airport
- Destinations: 4
- Headquarters: Dili, East Timor
- Key people: Jeremias Desousa (founder), James Stewart Kim (CEO)
- Website: flytimorair.com

Timor Air was an airline launched in partnership with Vincent Aviation in July 2011. It was the proposed flag carrier airline of East Timor (Timor-Leste).

== History ==
An agreement was signed with Brisbane, Australia-based airline SkyAirWorld on 27 November 2008 to establish the airline using an Embraer ERJ-190 belonging to SkyAirWorld, and taking advantage of SkyAirWorld's management expertise. However, SkyAirWorld ceased operations in March 2009. Timor Air's founder Jeremias Desousa gave the government of Timor-Leste a 10% share in the new airline.

In April 2012, the airline signed a memorandum of understanding (MoU) with AvCon Worldwide Limited, a London, UK based aviation consulting firm, and appointed managing director of AvCon Worldwide Limited, James Stewart Kim as its new CEO.

In May 2012, the airline ceased Saab 340 operations on the Dili-Darwin route due to low patronage. The same month, the airline signed an MoU with an undisclosed operator to serve the Dili-Darwin route with jet equipment, and to commence services on other routes under its plan.

== Destinations ==
Plans were to initially fly daily services from Dili's Presidente Nicolau Lobato International Airport to the island of Bali, Indonesia; and to Darwin, Australia; with services to commence on 2 February 2009. Additional routes were expected to be added during 2009, but none came about.

However a daily service from Dili to Darwin International Airport finally commenced 26 July 2011.

Country	City	Airport	Notes	Refs
Australia	Darwin	Darwin Airport	—	
East Timor	Dili	Presidente Nicolau Lobato International Airport	Hub	
Indonesia	Jakarta	Soekarno-Hatta Airport	—	

== Fleet ==
At March 2012 Timor Air had one SAAB 340B, operated by Vincent Aviation

== Demise ==
In May 2012, Timor Air stopped flights, saying it did not have enough passengers.

== See also ==
- Vincent Aviation
- List of Airlines
- List of defunct airlines of East Timor
