= SYW =

SYW or syw may refer to:

- SYW, the ICAO code for SkyAirWorld, a defunct airline based in Brisbane, Australia
- syw, the ISO 639-3 code for Kagate language, Nepal
