= North Shore Air =

IATA	ICAO	Call sign
NS	–	–
- Founded: 28 September 2015; Auckland, New Zealand
- Commenced operations: 28 September 2015
- Ceased operations: 30 October 2015
- Hubs: North Shore Aerodrome
- Fleet size: 1
- Destinations: Tauranga; Kerikeri; North Shore
- Key people: Peter Newman CEO; Daryl Williamson Chief Pilot
- Employees: 4 (2015)
- Website: www.northshoreair.co.nz

North Shore Air was a short-lived regional New Zealand scheduled airline that commenced daily flights between Auckland's North Shore and Tauranga in the Bay of Plenty, and Kerikeri in the Bay of Islands starting on 28 September 2015. Scheduled flights ended on 30 October 2015. The airline's CEO stated that the airline may operate charter flights instead.

== Fleet ==
North Shore Air's fleet consists of a single Piper Navajo.

== See also ==
- List of defunct airlines of New Zealand
- History of aviation in New Zealand
