= Air Post (disambiguation) =

Air Post may refer to:

- Air Post, a New Zealand cargo airline
- The Air Post, a location in the video game Kya: Dark Lineage
- Assistant Chief of the Air Staff head of the RAF
