= CityJet (disambiguation) =

CityJet or Cityjet may refer to:

- CityJet, an Irish airline
- CityJet (New Zealand), defunct New Zealand airline
- Cityjet, local train services of ÖBB (Austrian railways)
