= Skybus (Aqua Avia) =

- Skybus (Aqua Avia) logo
IATA	ICAO	Call sign
-	-	-
- Commenced operations: did not start operations
- Fleet size: 2 Vickers Viscount
- Headquarters: Matamata, New Zealand
- Key people: Matt Thomson

Skybus Vickers Viscount ZK-SKY

Skybus was an attempt to create a privately owned commercial airline in New Zealand during the 1970s, a time of state-owned public transport. It was a brainchild of the entrepreneur Matt Thomson. Matt Thompson was a businessman who had founded the successful Car Haulaways Transport Group. Frustrated by problems with the Cook Strait ferries, he then proceeded to set up Nationwide Air which utilised two ATL.98 Carvairs on freight work from the late 1970s.

== Planned operations ==
He also envisaged engaging in passenger transport, but at that time all New Zealand aerial transport was governed by the Air Services Licensing Authority. To gain a license to operate from the Authority you had to prove unmet demand, and any application for such a license would obviously be strenuously opposed by state-owned Air New Zealand.

As with all such restrictions, there were loopholes. One such loophole was that members of a club or association could band together and charter an aircraft from an organisation that already held a charter license. Therefore Matt Thompson formed the Aqua Avia Society in 1980 and proceeded to arrange for the charter of a suitable aircraft and eventually chartered two Vickers Viscount aircraft for their airline, which was given the name Skybus.

By using the legal loophole, Aqua Avia created their business plan of forming a club with annual membership rather than charging passengers fares per flight, thus avoiding the charge that they would be in direct competition with the State-owned airlines (and thus not needing to apply for licenses for their air routes). As Aero Clubs were exempt from the licensing act due to the charter license loophole, they could operate as many charter flights as they liked. The Aqua Avia Society linked with the Piako Aero Club of Matamata, who had the Viscounts registered in their ownership.

== Demise ==
The New Zealand government, however, intervened and created enough obstacles and delays to push Aqua Avia into insolvency. This was done by Air New Zealand filing a formal objection which was upheld by the New Zealand Airworthiness Authorities. The delays caused by this objection derailed Skybus as it was about to commence its commercial service, having taken delivery of the two Viscount aircraft in their new livery.

A credit card size plastic i/d card was issued to members and was valid for life. On the rear of card was a discount offer from Budget Car Rental.

== Fleet ==
Aircraft	Introduced	Retired	Notes
Vickers Viscount	1981	1981	One aircraft

== See also ==
- List of defunct airlines of New Zealand
- History of aviation in New Zealand
