= CityJet (New Zealand) =

New Zealand airline

- Commenced operations: May 1999
- Ceased operations: November 1999
- Hubs: Wellington. New Zealand
- Parent company: Tranzglobal Holdings
- Key people: Paul Webb and Steve Mosen

CityJet was a short-lived New Zealand airline. It operated between May and November 1999.

== History ==
CityJet was launched when TranzGlobal founded by Steve Mosen on 28 June 1994, a freight airline operator, decided to establish a low-cost passenger service, competing with Air New Zealand, Ansett New Zealand, and Origin Pacific Airways. It was set up by Paul Webb and Steve Mosen. CityJet operated in the Cook Strait area, having a hub in Wellington and serving Nelson, Blenheim, and Palmerston North. Auckland, Hamilton and later Christchurch were also served.

The airline's fleet was based on the Embraer EMB 110 Bandeirante. The airline operated passenger flights during the day then removed the seats to operate freight flights at night. The airfares were very cheap at only $29 and undercut the cheapest at Air New Zealand and Ansett New Zealand which were $89 at the time. The fares were also cheaper than the three ferry operators; The new Top Cat service had a $35 introductory fare, Cook Strait Sea Cat's fare was $49, while the Interislander fare cost $46 and the Lynx fast ferry $59.

In October 1999, the Civil Aviation Authority grounded CityJet's aircraft after allegations of irregularities in the recording of flight times. Some flights continued using chartered aircraft, but in November, the airline's pilots were placed under restrictions. CityJet ceased flying in November, and the company ceased operating the following month.

== See also ==
- List of defunct airlines of New Zealand
- History of aviation in New Zealand
