= James Air =

IATA	ICAO	Call sign
—	VLN	-
- Founded: 1978
- Ceased operations: 1983
- Headquarters: Nelson, New Zealand

On 1 July 1978 Capital Air Services, established in 1970 as a subsidiary of the Wellington Aero Club, was rebranded as James Air. At the time of the rebranding Capital Air Services were using four Cessna 402 aircraft. The airline was based in Nelson, New Zealand.

== Routes ==
The change from Capital Air Services to James Air saw the end of the air service to Greymouth and Christchurch with the airline focussing on Cook Strait services from its Nelson base to Blenheim, Wellington and Palmerston North as well as flights from Blenheim to Wellington. The airline also continued to offer charter services. In October 1980 James Air conceded that it could not compete with Air New Zealand over Cook Strait and cut back on its Wellington flights. Passengers flights to and from Blenheim were reduced with a largely-courier only service of one return flight being offered six days week, and likewise the Wellington-Nelson run was reduced to one return service five days a week. Faced with higher costs, dropping patronage, and the loss of a key Databank contract, James Air slashed its Wellington flights on 1 April 1981 with the airline deciding to concentrate on its Nelson-Palmerston North service. The Nelson-Wellington service was reduced to one scheduled return flight a week and all flights from Blenheim were cut. In August that year, however, with Air New Zealand cutting its early-morning flight between Blenheim and Wellington James Air applied to the Air Services Licensing Authority for permission to run at least three flights a week between Wellington and Blenheim and a minimum of the same number of flights between Blenheim and Palmerston North, through Nelson. These flights commenced soon after with a Monday to Friday service being offered.

== Fleet ==
Aircraft	Entered service
Cessna 402A	1 July 1978
Beech 99	1982
Aero Commander 500A	Unknown

== The end of the name ==
The James Air name disappeared from Cook Strait on 1 August 1983 when the airline was renamed Avcorp Commuter reflecting its ownership by the Aviation Corporation Ltd.

== See also ==
- List of defunct airlines of New Zealand
- History of aviation in New Zealand
