= Pacific Express Cargo =

New Zealand based cargo (1992)

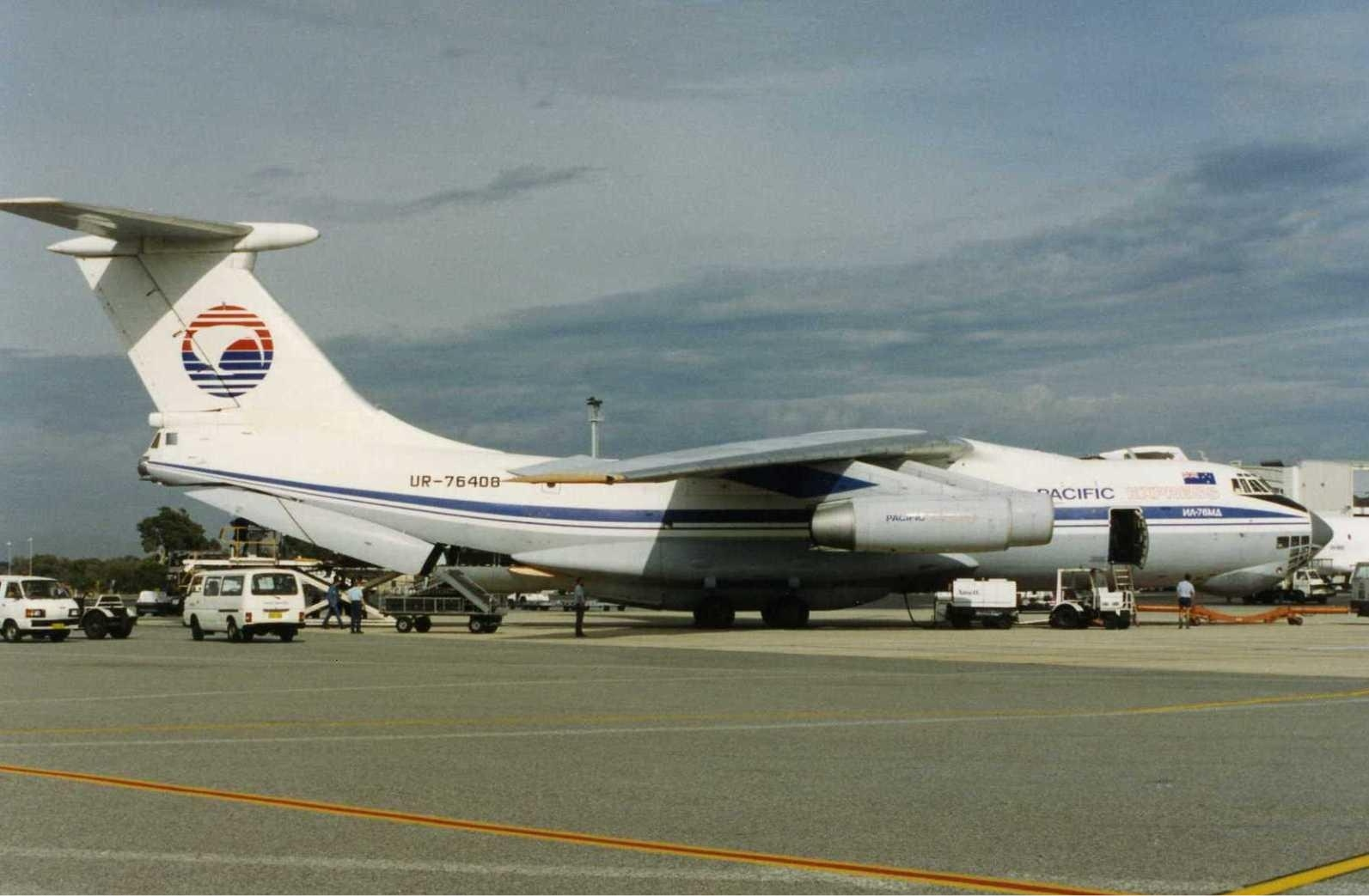
- A Pacific Express Ilyushin Il-76MD
- Commenced operations: March 1992
- Ceased operations: 16 September 1993
- Hubs: Auckland
- Headquarters: Auckland, New Zealand
- Key people: Simon Lahav; Roger Banks; Grant Annals

Pacific Express Cargo was a New Zealand based cargo airline established in 1992. It was founded by the Israeli businessman Simon Lahav, alongside Roger Leslie Banks and Roderick Grant Annals. Banks and Annals had previously operated the shortly lived Southern World Airlines in 1991, operating charter cargo services.

Pacific Express operated leased Il-76 freighter aircraft from Russia and Ukraine, exploiting the turmoil following the dissolution of the Soviet Union. The airline did not have a traditional fleet of aircraft, instead leasing aircraft on a tramp trade once a cargo contract had been arranged. It did not have an air operators certificate, exploiting a loophole present with the Civil Aviation Authority.

== History ==
When the first aircraft arrived in New Zealand, it still contained the Soviet flag on the tail, which would be painted over at Whenuapai Air Base.

In November 1992, Pacific Express took part in the airshow "Air Expo 92" with an Il-76MD registration CCCP-76822. The aircraft, flown by a Russian crew, was also used to transport a Royal Air Force Harrier jump jet to the airshow. It was also accompanied by a Russian Beriev A-40 Albatros flying boat.

== Fleet ==
Former Pacific Express Cargo fleet
| Aircraft | Number | Introduced | Withdrawn | Notes |
|---|---|---|---|---|
| Ilyushin Il-76TD | 3 | 1992 | 1993 | CCCP-76493 leased from VASO.; CCCP-76798 leased from Aeroflot.; RA-76786 leased from Domodedovo Airlines. |
| Ilyushin Il-76MD | 3 | 1992 | 1993 | CCCP-76822 leased from Ilyushin Design Bureau.; UR-76408 leased from Atlant-SV.; CU-C1258 leased from Cubana de Aviacion. |
| Boeing 737-300 | 1 | 1993 | 1993 | 5W-FAX leased from Polynesian Airlines. |

== See also ==
- List of defunct airlines of New Zealand
