= Straits Air Freight Express =

Logo of Safe Air Limited

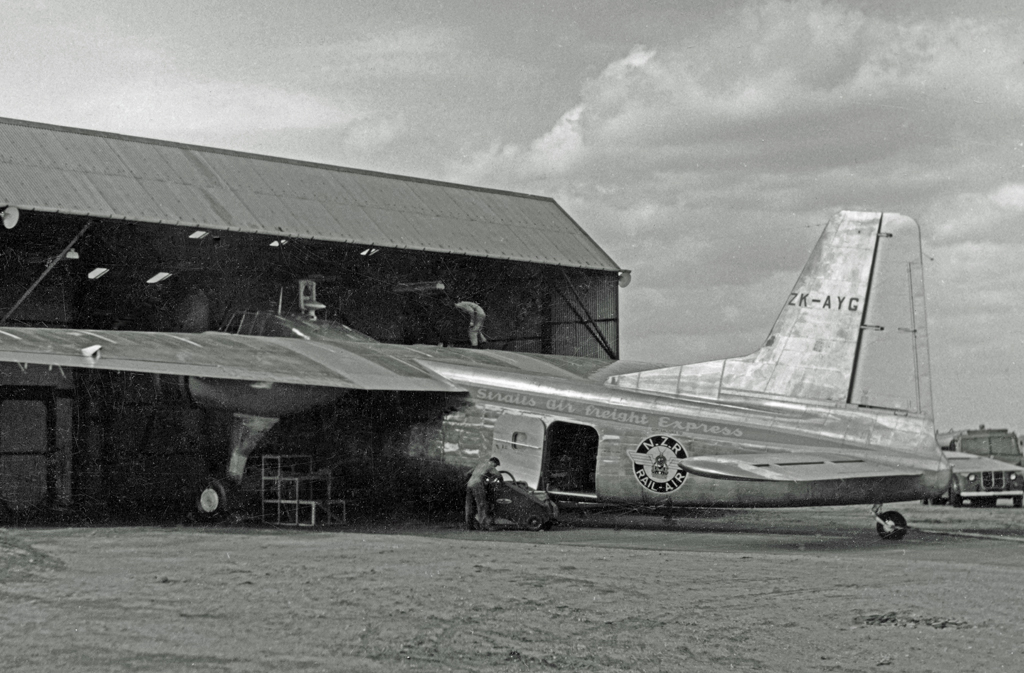
SAFE Bristol 170 series 31 in 1955 after rebuilding its fuselage with no windows. The badge near the door reads "NZR Rail Air"

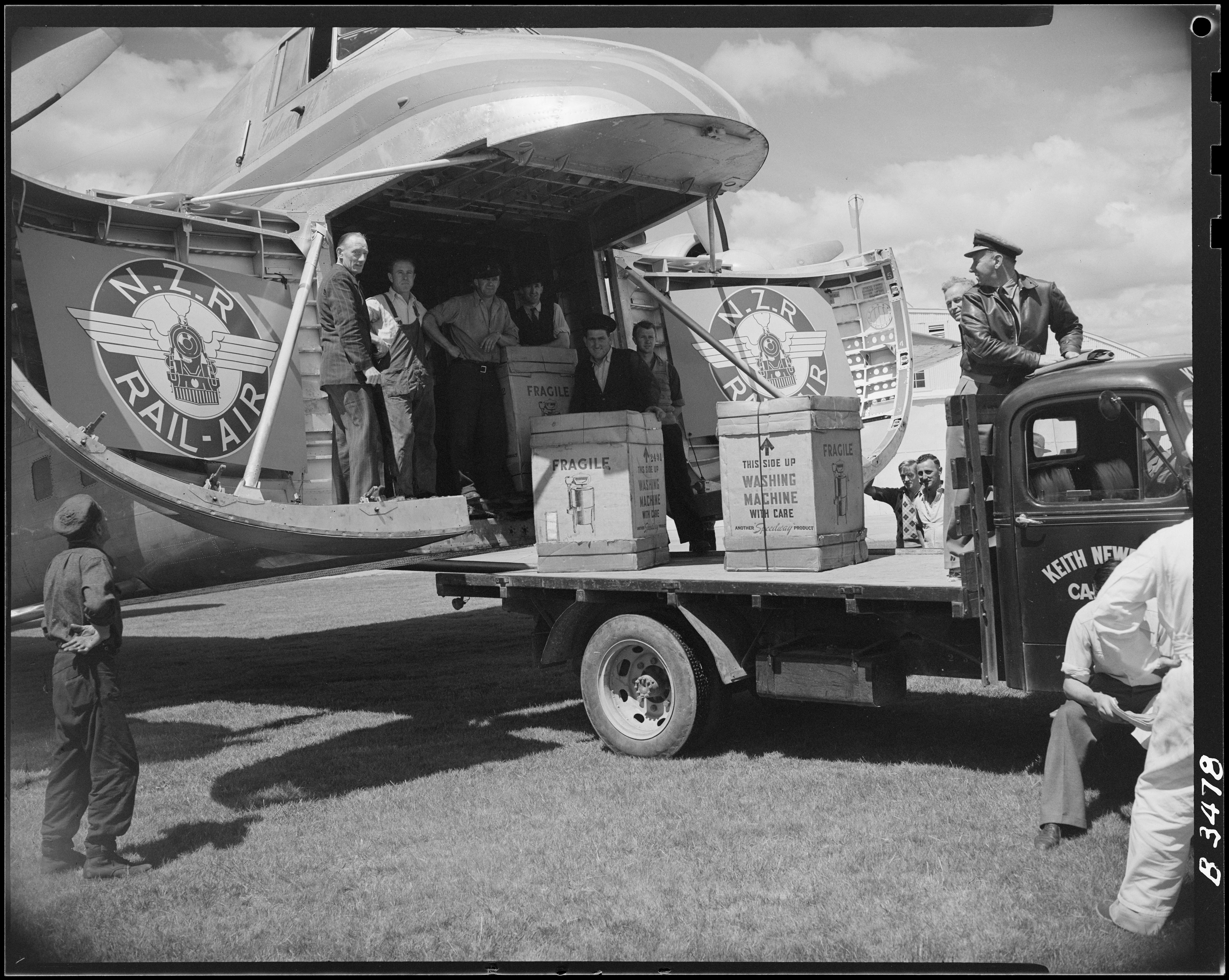
Bristol Freighter unloading at Nelson, November 5 1952

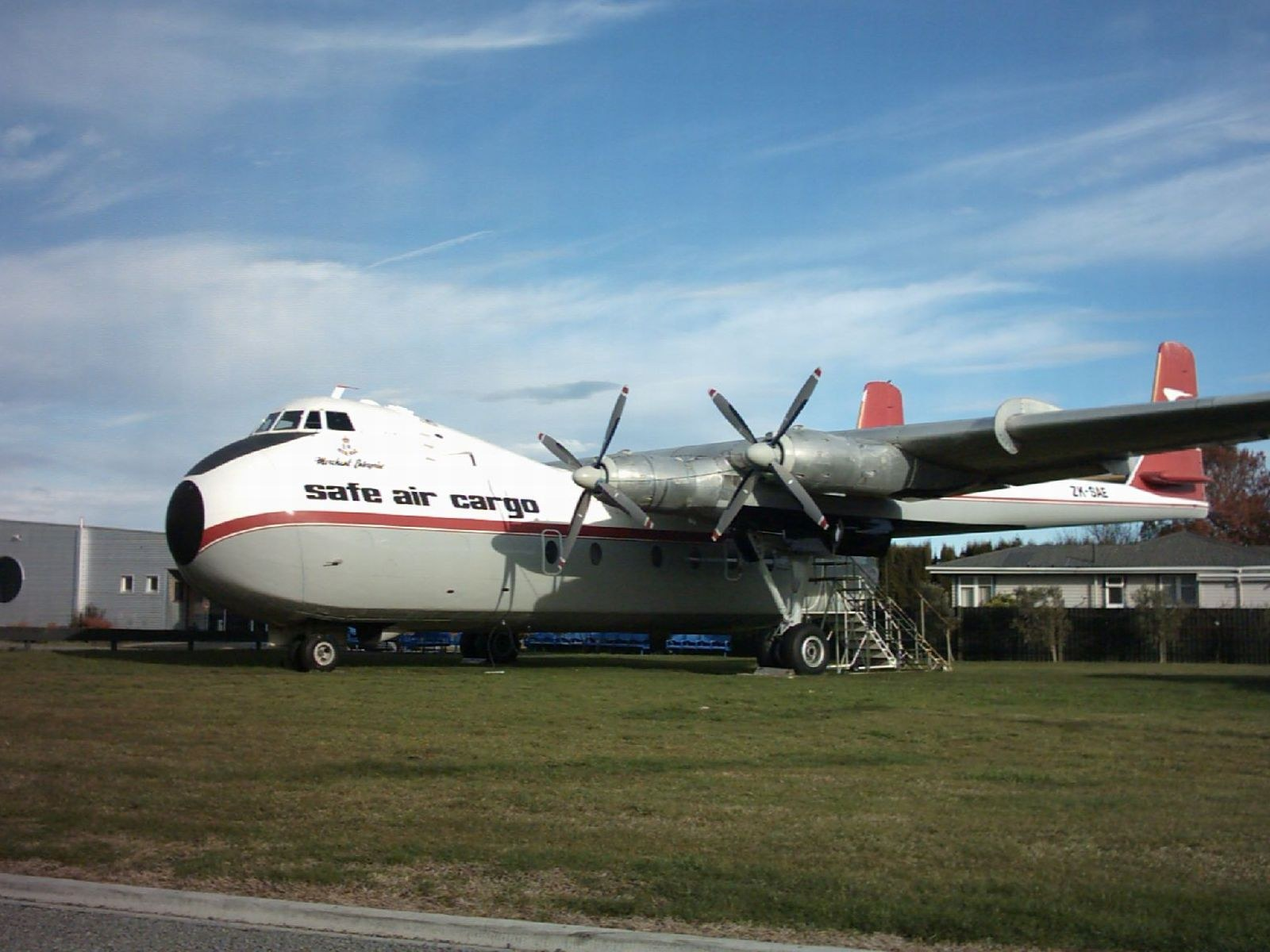
Armstrong Whitworth AW.650 Argosy, ZK-SAE, Merchant Enterprise in Blenheim, New Zealand.

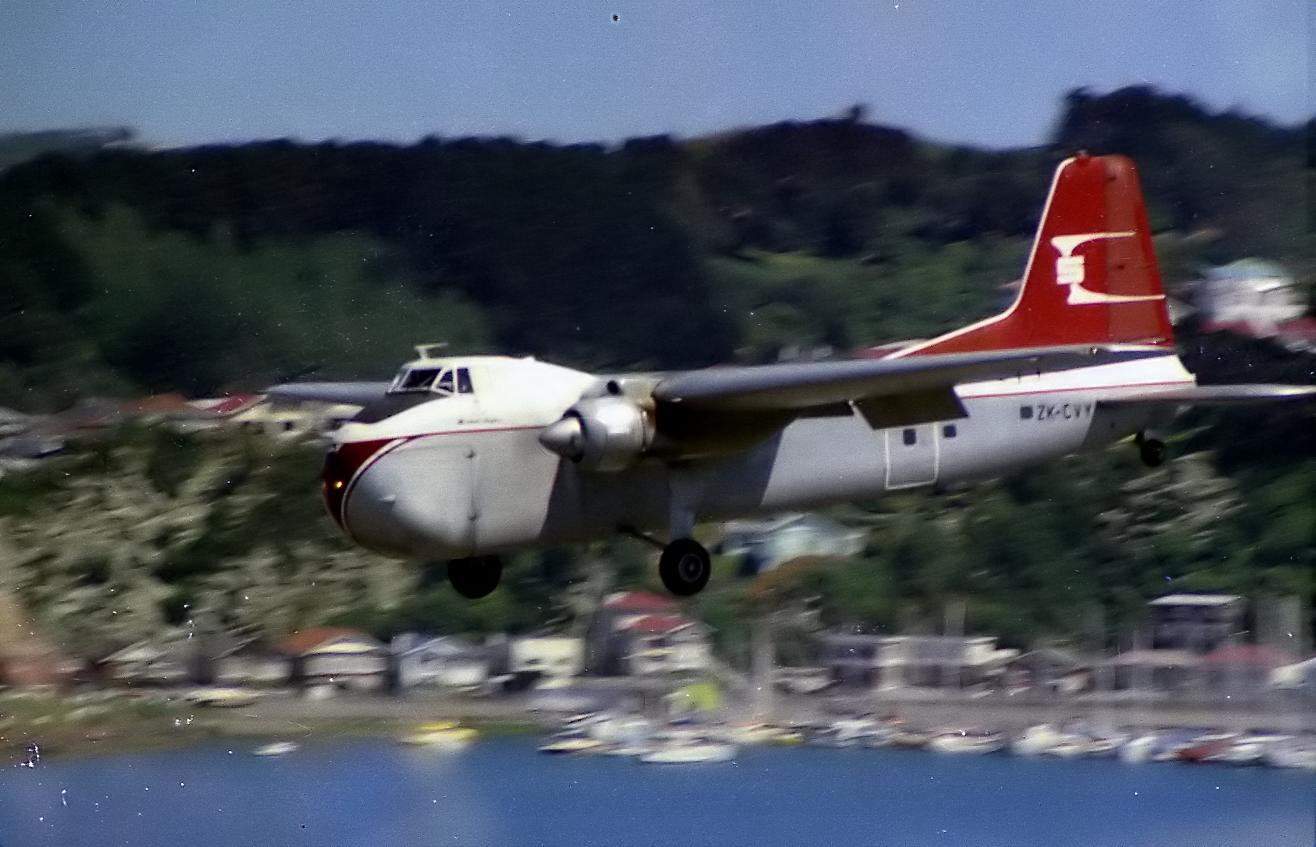
Bristol Freighter on approach to Wellington, New Zealand, 1981

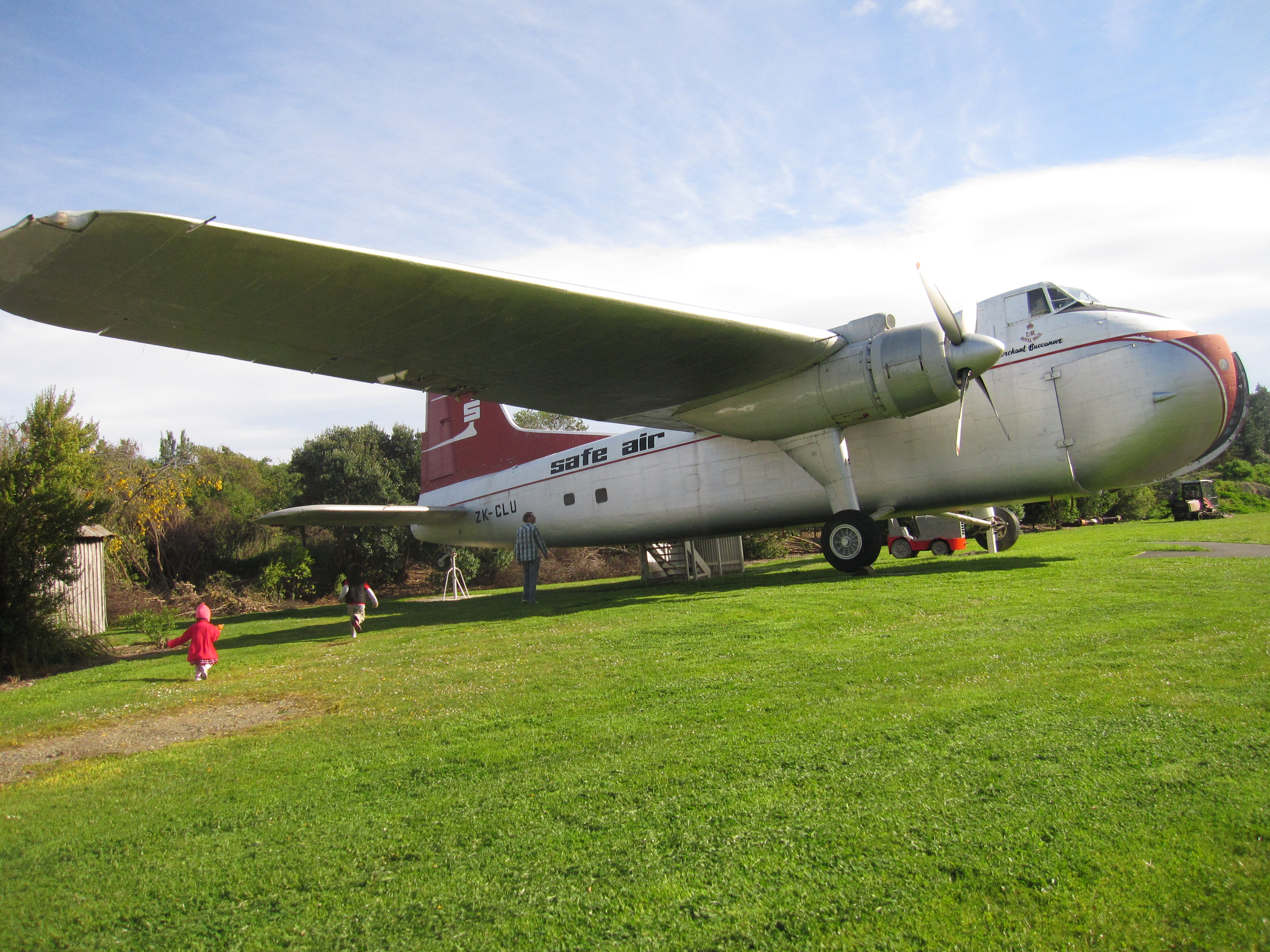
Bristol Freighter on display in Nelson city, 2012

Straits Air Freight Express (SAFE) was a cargo airline, established in 1950, named for its Cook Strait focus and connecting the North Island and South Islands of New Zealand's railway systems from the 1950s to the 1970s. The company was renamed Safe Air Limited in 1966 and diversified into aviation maintenance. In 1972 it was bought by the National Airways Corporation, which then merged with Air New Zealand. Safe Air continued to be operated as an independent entity by both owners. It ceased flying in 1990, but has continued to expand as a maintenance facility and now employs approximately 350 staff. In 2015 it was bought by the Australian arm of Airbus.

== Rail Air ==
In 1947, New Zealand Railways Department (NZR) and the Royal New Zealand Air Force began flying between Paraparaumu and Blenheim with a service that came to be known as Rail Air. SAFE took over the service from the RNZAF in 1950. Much of NZR's inter-island freight moved to its new Inter-island rail ferry service from 1962 with the introduction of the GMV Aramoana, but the Rail Air service survived until December 1983.

== Fleet ==
The main aircraft type that the company operated was the Bristol Type 170 Freighter Mk.31. The first two examples were delivered in mid-1951. The "cargon" system was designed in-house – a wheeled metal pallet and transfer system using modified railway flatcars to allow trucked loads to be transferred directly into the nose doorway of the tail-wheeled aircraft. This reduced the turn-around time of flights to about 15 minutes. 53,777 tons were carried between Woodbourne and Papaparaumu in 1961/62, but declined 25% next year, when Aramoana started the Interislander. The route closed in 1983. Eleven Bristol 170s were still in operation with SAFE in 1977.

The company also operated two larger Armstrong Whitworth AW.650 Argosy four-engined turbine propeller freighter aircraft from the 1970s.

Aircraft	Introduced	Retired	Notes
Armstrong Whitworth AW 650 Argosy Series 222	1973	1990	Three aircraft
Bristol Freighter Mk 31	1951	1986	22 aircraft
Curtiss C-46D	1951	1951	Four aircraft leased from Civil Air Transport in Taiwan.
Fokker F-27-400QC Friendship	1989	1990	One aircraft leased from Ansett Australia.

== Chatham Islands Passenger Services ==
New Zealand's most eastern islands, the Chatham Islands were linked with the main islands of New Zealand with combined air freight and passenger service using a unique removable passenger pod that was placed into the hold of their Bristol Freighter aircraft. Extra sound insulation was used to drown out the Bristol's Hercules engines and earplugs were provided. Windows in the pod lined up with those in the fuselage. The flight time was approximately three hours.

In 1982 when the paved runway at Tu-uta Point was built, Argosy aircraft were placed into the Chathams' route with a more comfortable passenger pod based on the cabin of a Boeing 737. The pod still exists today, placed in the hold of ZK-SAE on static display at Blenheim. When flying operations ceased in 1990 Air New Zealand continued operations with other aircraft, Air Chathams was founded to keep the air route open when Air New Zealand pulled out in 1992.

== See also ==
- List of defunct airlines of New Zealand
- History of aviation in New Zealand

== Bibliography ==
- Martyn, E.W. (1972). New Zealand aviation 100 years. Christchurch: Christchurch Aviation Historical Society.
- Rendel, D. (1975). Civil aviation in New Zealand. Wellington: A.H. & A.W. Reed.
- Davis, P.W.; Piercy, S. (1977). Bristol 170, Britannia and Canadian Developments. Air-Britain (Historians) Ltd. ISBN 0-85130-054-5.
- Ewing, R.; Macpherson, R. (1986). The history of New Zealand aviation. Auckland: Heinemann.
- King, J. (1996). Wings over New Zealand. Mt. Eden (Auckland): Saint Publishing.
