= SkyAirWorld =

Airline of Australia (2006–2009)

| IATA | ICAO | Call sign |
|---|---|---|
| S9 | SYW | SKY AIR |
- Founded: 2006
- Ceased operations: 22 February 2009
- Headquarters: Brisbane, Queensland, Australia
- Key people: Peter Anthony Lucas (Administrator)
- Website: www.skyairworld.com

SkyAirWorld was a scheduled and charter airline based in Brisbane, Queensland, Australia. It provided a range of services including charter work for the Australian military, and also provided wet-leases for other carriers, particularly airlines in the South Pacific.

== History ==
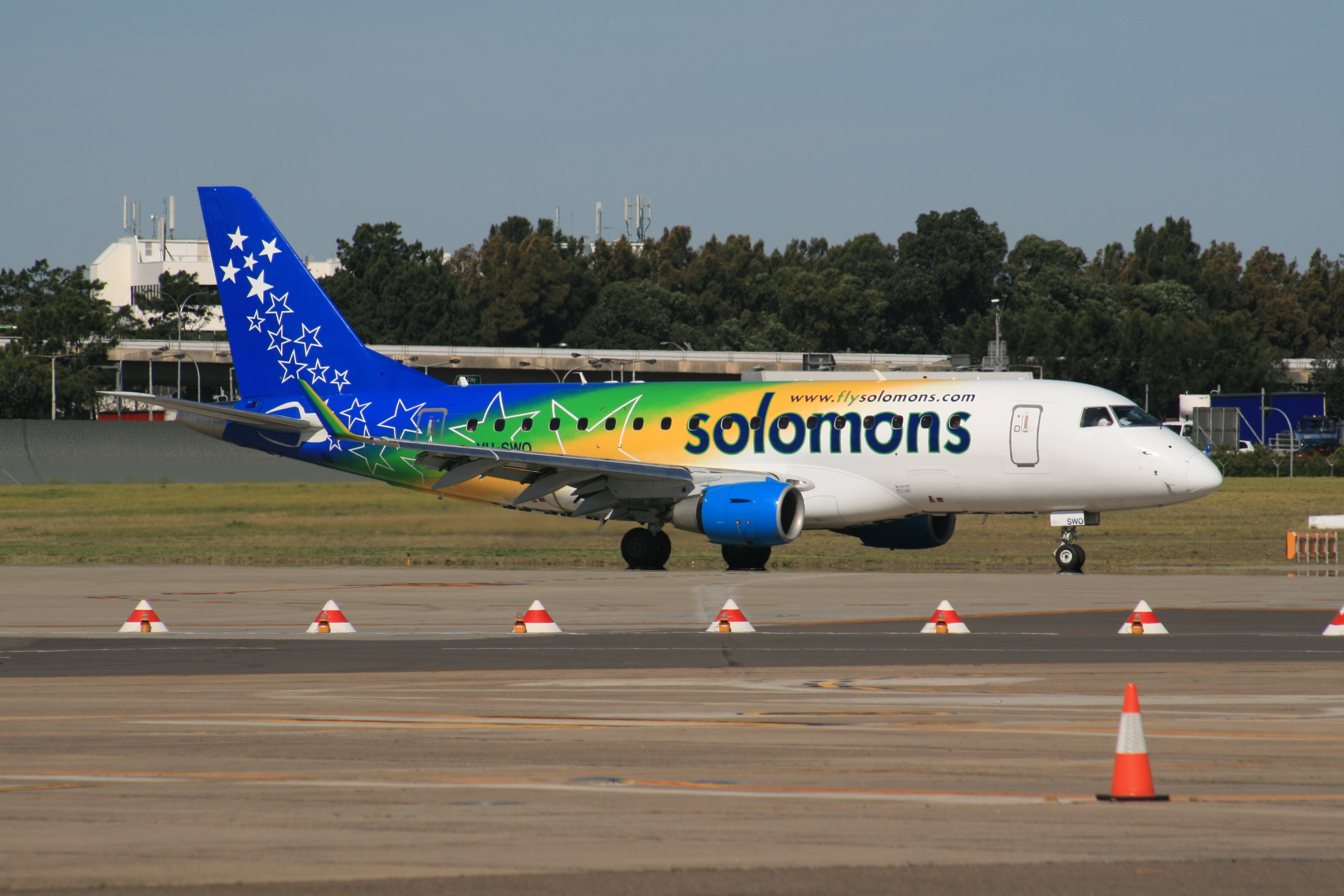
SkyAirWorld's Embraer ERJ-170, painted in the colours of Solomon Airlines.

SkyAirWorld first came to the attention of the aviation industry in Australia when it issued a Press Release on 2 October 2006 announcing its intentions. The company registered its first aircraft, a second-hand ERJ-170 on lease, on 8 March 2007; it arrived at Brisbane from Hong Kong the following week. The aircraft was promptly repainted in Solomon Airlines colours after an agreement was reached between the two airlines that SkyAirWorld would operate on behalf of Solomon's. Among its members was former Ozjet Airlines Chief Executive Officer, Mr Peter Schott an MBA graduate from Swinburne University in Melbourne.

The relationship proved to be short-lived, being suspended in August 2007 with each party blaming the other; SkyAirWorld claimed that it was not being paid, while from the other camp came claims that the ERJ-170 was inadequate to the task as it lacked adequate load-carrying capacity. The two parties attempted to resolve the dispute but on 3 October 2007 it was announced by the Solomon Islands Government that the agreement had been terminated. The aircraft was subsequently partially repainted to remove the Solomon's titles.

On 13 November 2007 it was reported in Solomon Islands media that a new airline would commence services between Brisbane and Honiara by the end of the month, using an ERJ-170 until an ERJ-190 became available early in 2008. The airline, to be called Coral Sea Express, was reported to have secured a partnership with a Solomons Islands-based company. The Managing director of Coral Sea Express was reported to be David Charlton, who was also the CEO of SkyAirWorld. However this did not eventuate, and on 10 January 2008 SkyAirWorld announced that it would enter a joint venture with Indonesian airline Lion Air (to be called Lion Air Australia), to enable Lion Air to enter the Australian domestic airline market, and to serve routes between Australia and Indonesia. Australian media outlets reported that Lion Air was taking a 49% interest in SkyAirWorld under the joint venture.

On 28 November 2008 SkyAirWorld was reported as signing an agreement to establish the flag carrier airline of Timor-Leste. The airline, to be called Timor Air, would use a SkyAirWorld Embraer 190 for services from Dili to Darwin and Bali; operations were planned to commence in February 2009. SkyAirWorld intended to operate on the route in its own right, commencing on 16 February 2009. At the same time the partnership with Timor Air was announced, SkyAirWorld's CEO David Charlton announced plans for the airline to fly twice-weekly domestic services from Brisbane to Darwin via Cloncurry.

In February 2009, SkyAirWorld grounded three of its Embraer aircraft and sacked 40 people out of its 140 workforce but the airline temporarily suspended its operations on 22 February 2009 after the airline cited that it would be restructuring its business. However, in March 2009 the airline had all of its Embraer aircraft repossessed by their lessor; with the airline, which owed more than A$40 million to creditors, placed under voluntary administration.

The former SkyAirWorld Chief Executive Officer (CEO) David Charlton and his father in-law, Kenneth Allan, claimed that SkyAirWorld owed them A$32 million with the airline's 140 former employees being owed A$1.8 million.

== Services ==
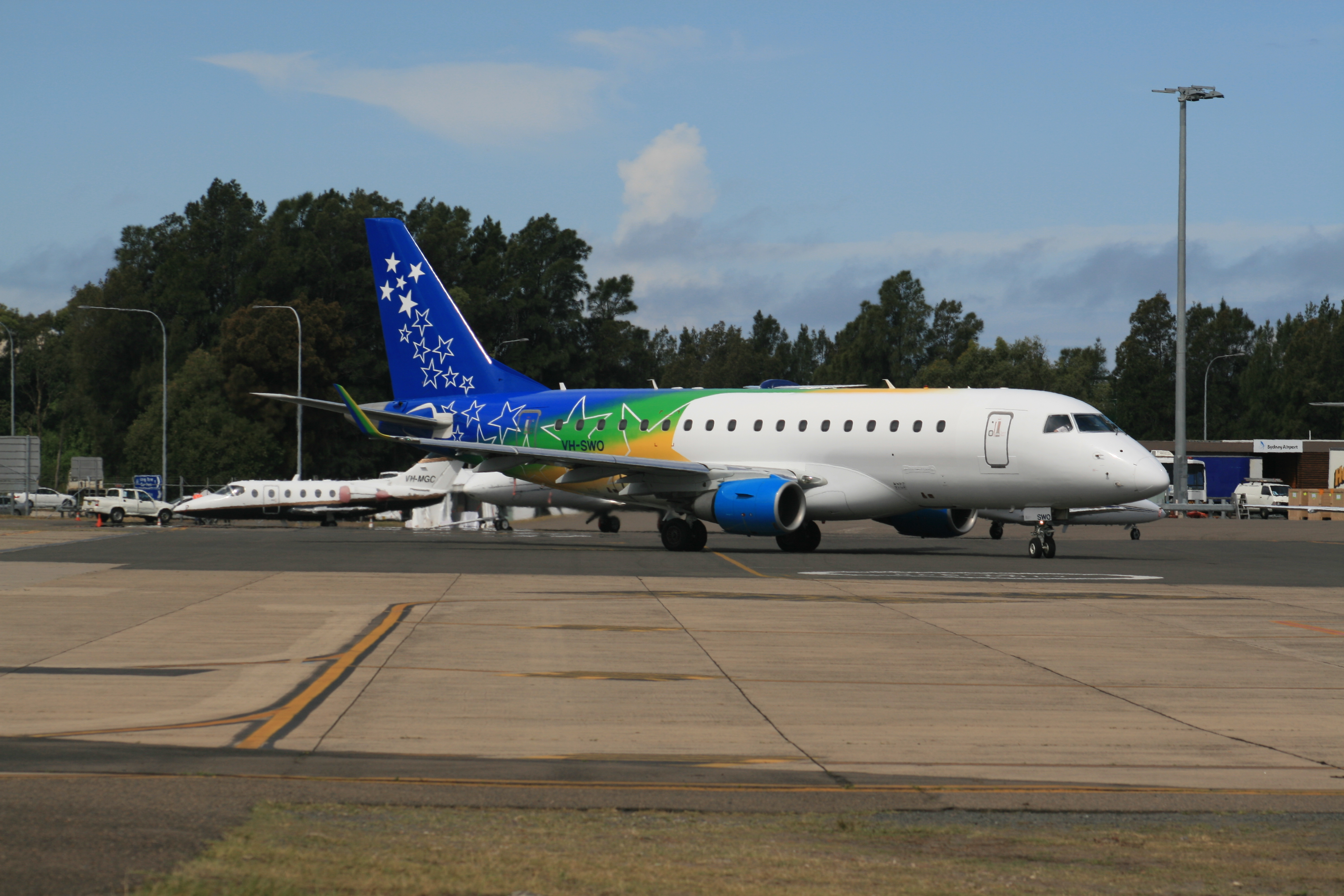
SkyAirWorld's ERJ-170 operating a charter flight from Sydney Airport

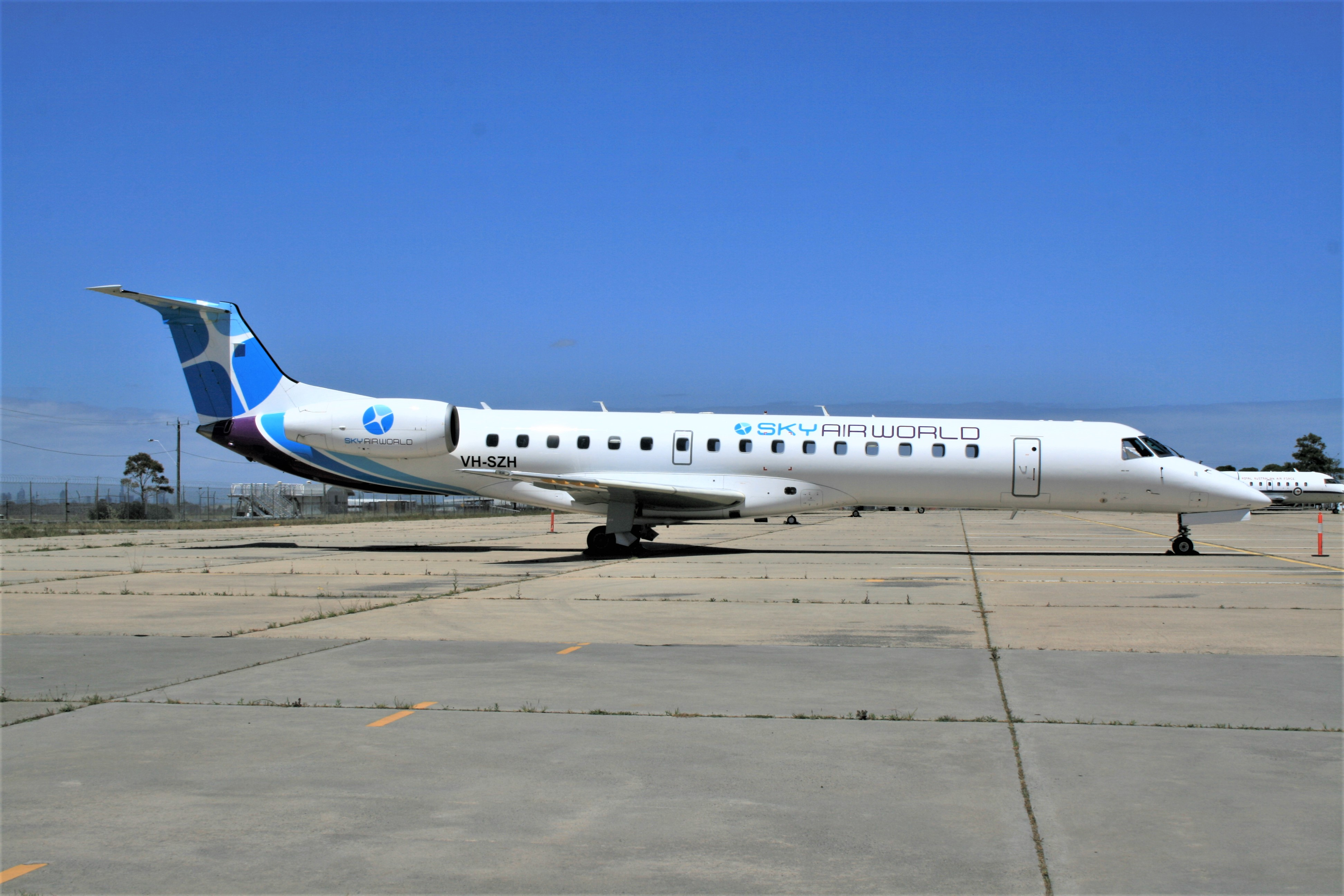
SkyAirWorld Embraer 145 parked at Melbourne Airport during a charter flight for the 2008 Melbourne Cup

After the termination of the agreement with Solomon Airlines, SkyAirWorld had initially limited itself to charter services. Following the delivery of the first ERJ-190, the airline re-entered the field of scheduled services, operating on behalf of Air Niugini on services to and from Sydney. It then commenced operating on its own behalf between Brisbane and Honiara, and following regulatory approval in late July, launched services between Brisbane and Cairns via Cloncurry in August 2008, flying three times a week.

== Fleet ==
In December 2008, before the airlines eventual collapse, the SkyAirWorld fleet consisted of:

- 2 Embraer 145
- 1 Embraer 170
- 2 Embraer 190

The Lion Air Australia joint venture was to have six Boeing 737-900ER aircraft, but this never came to fruition.

== See also ==
- List of defunct airlines of Australia
- Aviation in Australia
