= Pasifika Air =

Proposed New Zealand airline

| IATA | ICAO | Call sign |
|---|---|---|
| – | – | – |
- Commenced operations: Never commenced operations
- Operating bases: Christchurch, New Zealand
- Hubs: Avarua (Rarotonga), Cook Islands
- Focus cities: Wellington, New Zealand
- Fleet size: TBA
- Key people: Mike Pero (founder)
- Website: pasifikaair.co.nz

Pasifika Air was a proposed New Zealand–based airline planning to operate scheduled direct passenger flights between Christchurch, New Zealand and Rarotonga, Cook Islands. Originally called "JetRaro", the airline was rebranded as Pasifika Air in December 2020.

== History ==
In July 2020, Christchurch businessman Mike Pero announced his intention to incorporate the airline, subject to government approval, to form an air-link between Christchurch and the Cook Islands following the lifting of border restrictions as the result of the COVID-19 pandemic.

The initial proposal was to operate between three and five direct flights per week between Christchurch and Rarotonga, using a wet-leased Airbus A320 aircraft. In December 2020 Pero announced plans for the airline to conduct services itself under its own air operator certificate, utilising leased 737-800s. It was also announced that flights from Wellington to the Cook Islands would be included as well as Christchurch.

The company was registered in early December 2020. Initial plans were for flights to commence in May 2021. Continued uncertainty over the New Zealand Governments approach to the opening of a quarantine-free travel "bubble" between New Zealand and the Cook Islands saw Pero announce a pause on the launch. Pero noted that much of the work required to establish the airline was complete, and would be resumed when greater certainty could be established regarding NZ/Cook Islands travel.

Pero further noted that "The company and its funds remain fully intact and we will progress our AOC to a point where we can be ready to reignite."

At the start of May 2021, the New Zealand Government finally announced the commencement of a quarantine-free travel bubble between New Zealand and the Cook Islands. The bubble opened on 17 May 2021. On 4 May, Pero announced that the launch of Pasifika Air had resumed. First flights were expected in the 4th quarter of 2021.

On 18 Jun, Pero announced that lack of support from Cook Islands government had led to the grounding of his planned launch.

== Service ==
Precise details of the airlines service offering were to be revealed. It was expected the airlines offering to the Cook Islands would have focused on a more 'premium' product.

== Planned destinations ==
| Country | City | Airport | Notes |
|---|---|---|---|
| New Zealand | Christchurch | Christchurch Airport | |
| New Zealand | Wellington | Wellington Airport | |
| Cook Islands | Rarotonga | Rarotonga International Airport | |

== Fleet ==
In an interview with Radio New Zealand on 4 May 2021, Pero noted that the planned fleet would've likely consisted of Boeing 737–800 aircraft, but this was subject to confirmation.

Fleet (Proposed)
| Aircraft | Number in Fleet | Configuration |
|---|---|---|
Boeing 737–800
