= Airways Corp of New Zealand v Geyserland Airways Ltd =

- Court: High Court of New Zealand
- Full case name: Airways Corp of New Zealand v Geyserland Airways Ltd
- Decided: 30 June 1995
- Citation: [1996] 1 NZLR 116

Court membership
- Judge sitting: Thorp J

Airways Corp of New Zealand v Geyserland Airways Ltd [1996] 1 NZLR 116 is a New Zealand legal case involving the legal concept of acceptance.

== Background ==
IN 1987, the Airways Corporation of New Zealand (ACNZ) which was responsible for air traffic control in New Zealand was privatised.

In a bid to recoup its costs, it started charging airlines for providing this service. ACNZ gave Geyserland notice informing it that it was now subject to their "standard terms of contract", which included a term for the charging of landing fees, and they were subsequently invoiced for air control fees.

Geyserland refused to pay the charges, as they claimed they did not agree to any contract with them, even though they continued to request air traffic control services from ACNZ at the Rotorua airport. They pointed out that ACNZ were required by law to provide air traffic control services under the Civil Aviation Regulations 1953.

Left with no other option, ACNZ sued Geyserland for the unpaid landing fees.

== Held ==
The Court ruled that as Geyserland had not accepted ACNZ’s contract, there was no legally binding contract between the two parties.

The Court stated obiter, that ACNZ may have been successful if they had sued under quantum meruit i.e. Geyserland benefited from the improved air safety, but this was never plead in court by ACNZ.
