= Airways New Zealand =

Air traffic service provider

Airways Corporation of New Zealand Limited
- Type: State Owned Enterprise
- Industry: Air Navigation Services
- Founded: 1987
- Headquarters: Christchurch, New Zealand
- Number of locations: 19 Towers; 2 Radar Centres
- Key people: Denise Church, Chair; James Young, CEO
- Products: Air Traffic Control, Revenue Management Software
- Services: Air Traffic Controller Training; Technical Training; ANS Consulting
- Number of employees: 816 (July 2019)
- Website: www.airways.co.nz

Airways New Zealand (Airways Corporation of New Zealand Limited) is the sole Air Traffic Service provider in New Zealand.

The company was created 1987 as a State-Owned Enterprise having formerly being a division of the Ministry of Transport, a government department. This followed the recommendations of the 1986 Mason-Morris Review. Airways New Zealand is a commercial Air Navigation Service Provider (ANSP), responsible for managing all domestic and international air traffic operating within New Zealand's 30 million square kilometres of airspace over New Zealand, Tonga, Samoa and the Cook Islands. This involves:

- Air Traffic Control, Flight Information, Flight planning and alerting services.
- Navigation Services – the navigation infrastructure and supporting services used by aircraft.
- Communications – Airways operates a sophisticated communications system throughout the country.
- Flight maps
- Flight inspection services

Airways was the world's first ATC provider to operate a fully automated conflict probe with their Oceanic Control System (OCS). It assists controllers' decisions, by predicting possible conflicts. This formed the basis of the Lockheed Martin Ocean21 ATC system used by the United States' oceanic centres at Anchorage, Oakland and New York. These systems allow controllers to manage significantly more aircraft than traditional systems because the machine is responsible for detecting any potential future conflicts so the controller can then decide on an action that maintains a safe separation between aircraft.

Airways employs around 350 ATCs, who are based in regional air traffic control towers, military bases and radar centres. Airways is a full member of the Civil Air Navigation Services Organisation (CANSO).

== See also ==
- Civil Aviation Authority of New Zealand
- History of aviation in New Zealand
