= Southern World Airlines =

- Founded: November 21, 1988
- Commenced operations: March 18, 1991
- Ceased operations: September 20, 1991
- Hubs: Auckland
- Headquarters: Auckland, New Zealand
- Key people: Harvey Allen Misbin (CEO); Louis Patrick McElwee (Chairman); Roger Banks; Grant Annals
- Employees: 85 (1991)

Southern World Airlines was a short lived New Zealand based cargo airline that was established in 1988. The airline commenced operations in March 1991 using leased Douglas DC-8 cargo aircraft, before ceasing operations shortly after in September 1991, following the release of allegations by TVNZ against its CEO Harvey Allen Misbin.

While short lived, the airline was the second international airline, following Air New Zealand to be based in the country.

== History ==
=== Incorporation ===
In 1988, it was reported that an undisclosed American entrepreneur was planning to establish a cargo airline in New Zealand, with the intention of operating flights across the Pacific.

A number of notable New Zealand pilots were involved in SWA, including Thomas Trevor "TT" Bland, a former RNZAF pilot and founder of the New Zealand Warbirds Association, former Air New Zealand chief pilot Ian Harding Gemmell as well as veteran flight instructor James "Jim" Bergman.

=== CEO Drug smuggling links ===
In August 1991, only six months after the start of operations, Harvey Misbin relinquished his controlling share in the company, and his position of chief executive.

On 25 August 1991, Television New Zealand aired a report presented by Rod Vaughan that accused Misbin of running drug flights between South America and the United States for the Medellín Cartel, prior to managing Southern World. Misbin had been subpoenaed to appear before a US Grand Jury investigation in drug smuggling activities, and had been under surveillance by the United States Department of the Treasury. Despite this, Misbin had been granted New Zealand citizenship and an airline operators license.

=== End of operations ===
Following the shuttering of SWA, Roger Banks and Grant Annals would relaunch a new cargo airline named Pacific Express, using leased aircraft from the former Soviet Union.

== Fleet ==
=== Former fleet ===
Former Southern World Airlines fleet
Aircraft	Total	Introduced	Retired	Notes
McDonnell Douglas DC-8	2	1991	1991	N345JW leased from Arrow Air.; N863E leased from Kalitta Air.
