= K2000 Airlines =

New Zealand airline

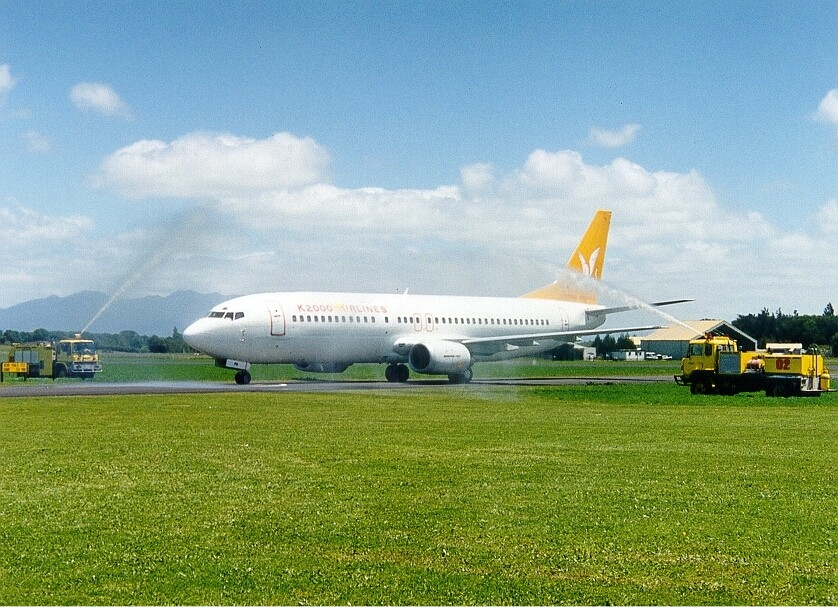
- K2000 Airlines' sole Boeing 737-400
- Commenced operations: 1 December 1999
- Ceased operations: 8 January 2000
- Fleet size: 1
- Headquarters: Auckland, New Zealand
- Founder: Jeff Matthews
- Website: k2000airlines.com

K2000 Airlines was a low-cost airline founded by Jeff Matthews that commenced operations on 1 December 1999 with a Boeing 737-400 leased from Pegasus Airlines. It flew from Dunedin and Hamilton in New Zealand to Brisbane and Sydney in Australia.

Operations ceased on 8 January 2000 after five weeks with the airline placed in administration.
