= Airwork =

Airline of New Zealand

| IATA | ICAO | Call sign |
|---|---|---|
| — | AWK | AIRWORK |
- Founded: 1936
- Operating bases: Auckland, Brisbane, Christchurch and Perth
- Subsidiaries: Airwork Flight Operations Ltd, Airwork Ireland Ltd
- Fleet size: 7
- Parent company: ASL Airlines Australia
- Headquarters: Auckland, New Zealand
- Key people: Greg Chase (CEO)
- Founders: Charles & Arthur Brazier
- Revenue: $90 million
- Website: www.airworkgroup.com

Airwork is an aviation business based in Auckland, New Zealand. It focuses on fixed-wing maintenance, leasing, and operations, working with private and public entities on aviation operations, with a fleet of Boeing 737 freighters.

It operates freight services in Australia for Qantas. It operates night postal services for New Zealand Post and Freightways through a joint venture agreement. Its main fixed-wing base is Auckland Airport in New Zealand. The Australian freighter fleet has its headquarters at Brisbane Airport, with operational bases in Perth, Adelaide, Melbourne

== History ==
The Airwork group is one of New Zealand's oldest aviation companies. Airwork was first established in 1936 by aircraft engineers Charles and Arthur (Bill) Brazier as an aircraft maintenance company originally assembling Tiger Moth biplanes at Rongatai Airfield in Wellington. As the industry developed, Airwork moved into the engine overhaul business and in the 1970s became a listed company in which Brierley Investments built up a substantial shareholding. The business was purchased in 1984 by Hugh Jones and Alan Hubbard, and in 1988, Hugh Jones took control of the whole business.

Airwork Holdings Limited was listed on the New Zealand Stock Exchange (NZX) in 2013 with the code AWK at an IPO price of NZ$2.60 per share. Airwork's profit has increased 52% in the year ending 30 June 2014. In October 2016, Chinese Zhejiang Rifa Holding Group offered $5.40 per share for 75 per cent of the business. The offer closed in early March 2017 with 94.7 per cent shareholder acceptance. On 27 September 2017, Rifa Jair Company, a unit of Zhejian Rifa Holding group Co, made a full takeover offer for all fully paid ordinary shares of Airwork Holdings at a 21 percent premium to the closing price on 26 September 2017.

In January 2020, Airwork began services across the Tasman with the start of Auckland to Sydney flying in conjunction with FedEx. In December 2022, Airwork sold its helicopter business to Salus Aviation.

On 2 July 2025, Daniel Stoneman, Brendon Gibson and Neale Jackson of Calibre Partners were appointed joint and several receivers of Airwork Holdings Limited (In Receivership).

In May 2026, ASL Airlines Australia entered a conditional sale and purchase agreement (SPA) to purchase Airwork. A deal has yet to be confirmed.

== Fleet ==
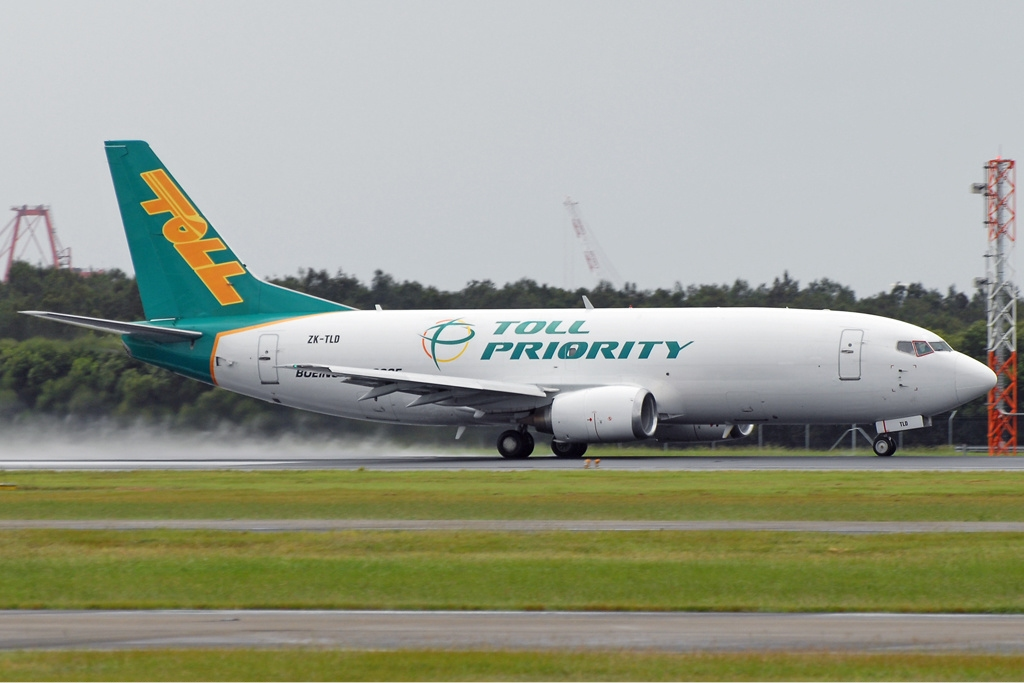
An Airwork Boeing 737-300 freighter at Brisbane Airport (2011).

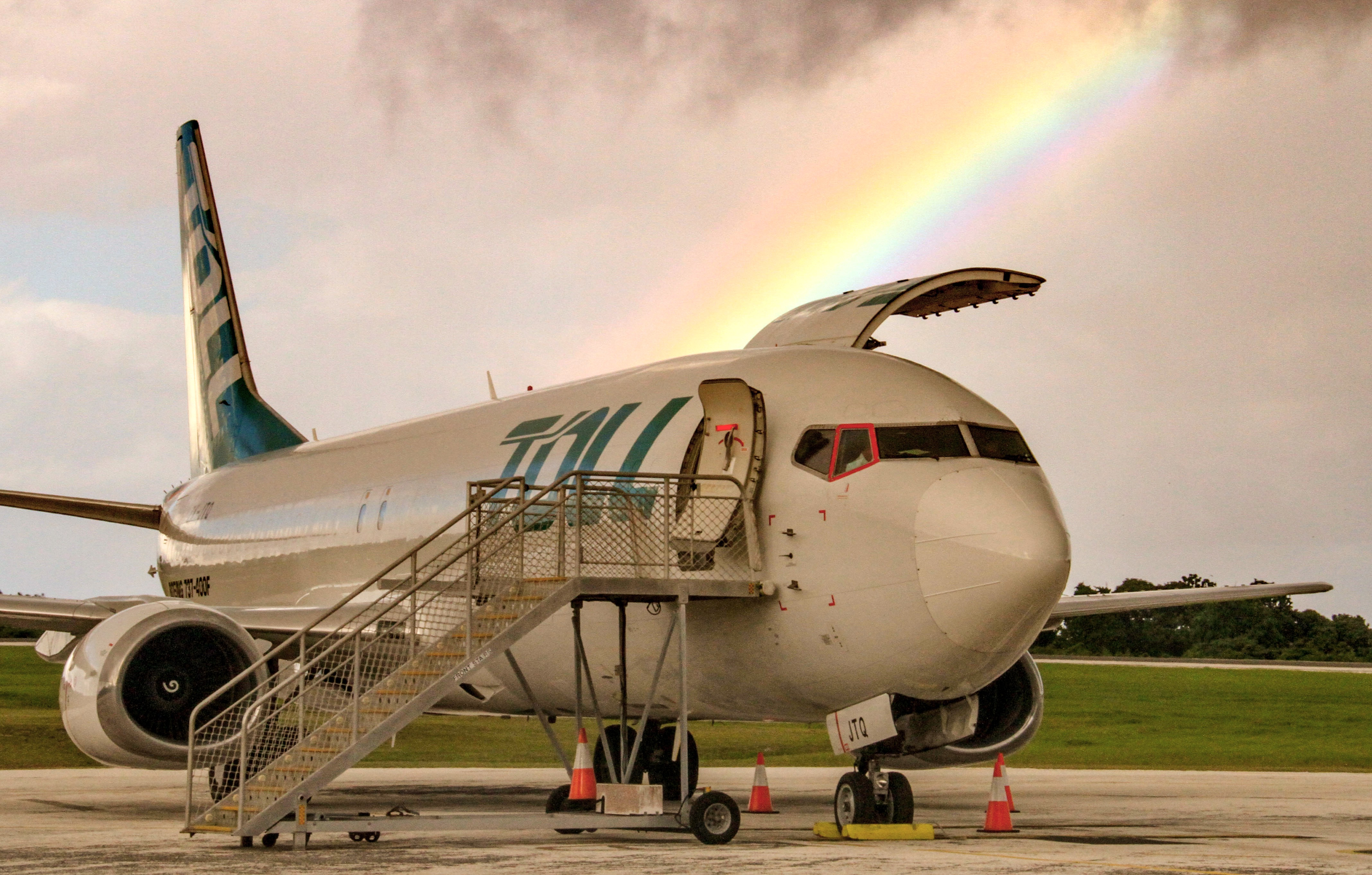
An Airwork Boeing 737-400F, operating for Toll Priority, at Christmas Island Airport (March 2016).

=== Current fleet ===
As of 2026, Airwork operates the following aircraft:

| Aircraft | Total | Orders | Notes |
|---|---|---|---|
| Boeing 737-800F | 1 | | |
| Boeing 737-400SF | 6 | | |
| Total | 7 | | |

=== Former fleet ===
Airwork previously operated the following aircraft:

- 1 Boeing 737-200C
- 11 Boeing 737-300SF
- 9 Boeing 737-400SF
- 4 Boeing 757-200PCF

== Incidents and accidents ==
- On 26 November 1993, two aircraft operated by Airwork, under contract to the New Zealand Police, collided in mid-air over central Auckland. The collision of the Aérospatiale TwinStar helicopter and Piper Archer fixed-wing aeroplane resulted in the deaths of all four occupants.
- On 2 May 2005 a Fairchild SA227-AC Metro III registration ZK-POA broke up in flight 6 km East of Stratford. The flight was an NZ Post service from Auckland to Blenheim. The crash killed the two occupants.
- On 26 January 2014, a Boeing 737-300F ZK-TLC conducting a Toll freight service from Brisbane was involved in an incident while landing at Henderson field, Honiara in the Solomon Islands. The right landing gear collapsed during the rollout. None of the three crew were hurt in the incident.
