= Vincent Aviation =

1992–2014 airline in New Zealand

IATA	ICAO	Call sign
BF*	VAL	VINCENT
- Founded: 1992
- Ceased operations: 2014
- Hubs: Wellington Airport
- Fleet size: 6
- Headquarters: Wellington, New Zealand
- Key people: Peter Vincent (founder, CEO)
- Website: www.vincentaviation.com.au www.vincentaviation.co.nz

Vincent Aviation was an airline based in Wellington, New Zealand. It operated air charter, freight and subcontract flights with a hub at Wellington Airport. It was founded by Peter Vincent in 1992. In May 2014 the Australian business was placed into receivership, followed in October 2014 by the New Zealand division.

== History ==
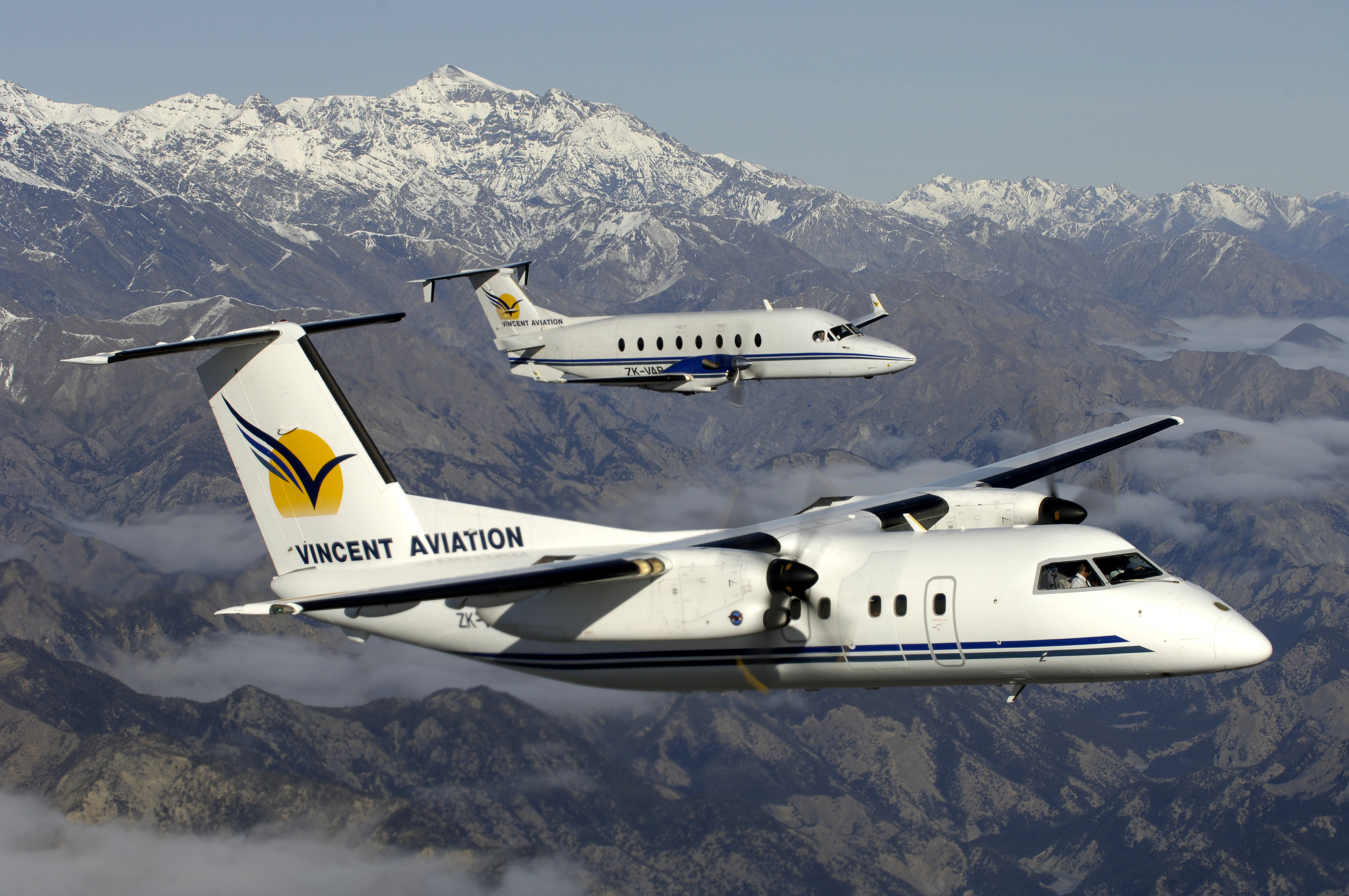
Vincent Aviation aircraft formation flying over the New Zealand Southern Alps

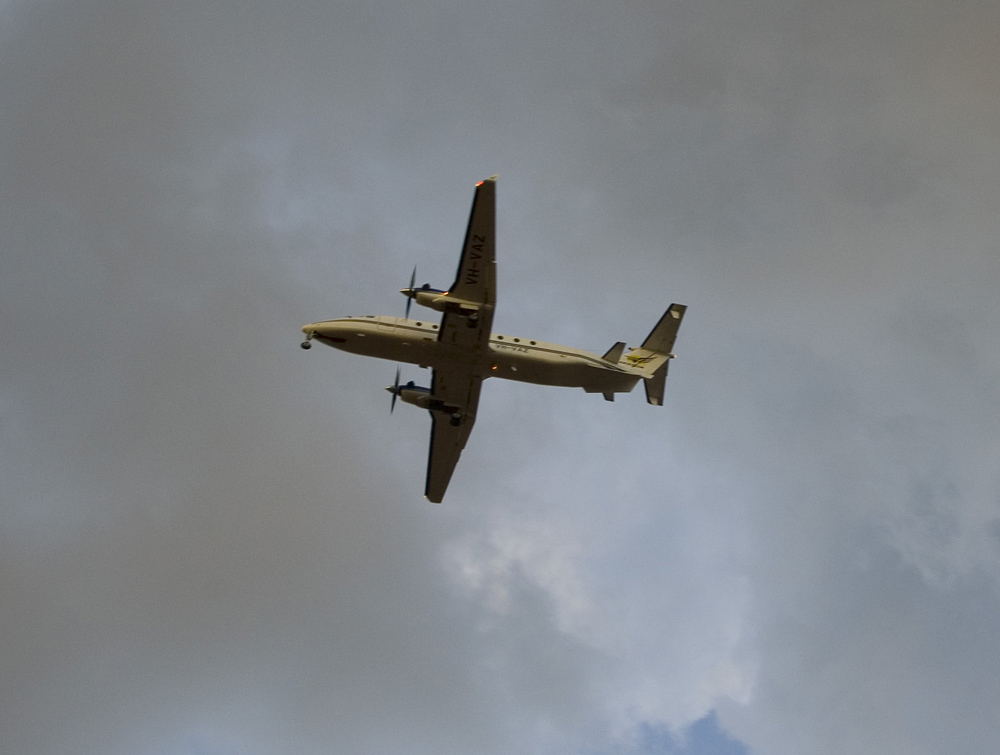
Vincent Aviation aircraft flying over Darwin International Airport

Vincent briefly operated a helicopter shuttle service from Wellington to Picton using a Bell 212. Vincent used a re-engined Riley Heron for wine-trail charters from Wellington to Blenheim. It was intended to use this aircraft for a service to the Chatham Islands, but this never eventuated. In the late 1990s, the airline acquired three Cessna 402Cs which were used on small freight contracts and overflow work from DHL.

It also briefly operated a Piper PA-34 Seneca as well as a Beechcraft Baron on similar work. In 2002 Vincent won a contract to fly United Nations peace keepers to East Timor using a Reims 406. Before long Vincent acquired its first Beechcraft 1900C for use on this contract, with a D model following. From that first UN contract, the Darwin, Australia based side of the business grew quickly, picking up contracts throughout the Northern Territory, mainly serving the resources sector.

At its peak the Darwin base operated up to nine Beech 1900C/Ds. In the early/mid-2000s, Vincent's first two Beech 1900s were used for Air New Zealand flights from Christchurch to Blenheim and Wellington to Palmerston North. Later a Dash 8-100 was acquired by the New Zealand business for charter work. For some time this aircraft was used heavily by Air Nelson to operate Air New Zealand services.

In more recent times Vincent NZ acquired four Jetstreams and a British Aerospace 146.

In February 2014, Vincent commenced operating the Sydney to Narrabri service under contract to Transport for NSW taking over from Brindabella. On 28 May 2014, the Australian operation ceased with BDO appointed receiver.

== Services ==
Vincent Aviation serves primarily as a charter airline. Its former scheduled passenger services in Australia were to Groote Eylandt and Cairns from Darwin, Narrabri from Sydney and regular charter flights from Darwin to Kununurra, Bootu Creek, Jabiru, Fortescue/Christmas Creek and from Brisbane to Roma. Vincent has also done work in Japan, Ireland, Malaysia, Myanmar and Indonesia. For a few months it operated scheduled flights from Darwin to Dili, Timor Leste, but these ceased early in 2012.

Vincent Aviation's air charter business in New Zealand operated one British Aerospace Jetstream 32EP exclusively for LifeFlight based in Wellington on air ambulance duties and a further two Jetstream 32EPs and one British Aerospace Jetstream 31 on charter services throughout New Zealand. Vincent has a contract to transport inmates around New Zealand for the Corrections Department. Airways New Zealand awarded Vincent the contract to provide air capability for the calibration of instrument approach aids throughout New Zealand. In August 2014 Vincent was chosen by the local Wairarapa council to operate a scheduled service from Masterton to Auckland using a Saab 340B. The aircraft were to be based overnight at Masterton and flights were expected to commence in the late 2014.

== Fleet ==
As of August 2014, the Vincent Aviation fleet consisted of the following aircraft: Wellington, New Zealand based fleet

Aircraft	Total	Passengers	Notes
Beechcraft 1900D	1	19	(ZK-VAB) This aircraft is based in Yangon, Myanmar and operates domestically on an oil and gas contract.
British Aerospace Jetstream 31	1	18	Equipped for Airways Calibration flights. Also used as a backup/overflow aircraft for LifeFlight (ZK-JSH)
British Aerospace Jetstream 32EP	3	19	One aircraft (ZK-LFW) is operated full-time as the Wellington-based LifeFlight Air Ambulance. The other two aircraft (ZK-VAH and -VAI) were operated solely as passenger aircraft on charter work throughout NZ
BAe 146-200	1	84	Can be converted to 48J seats (ZK-ECO)
Total	6		
