= History of aviation in New Zealand =

Aviation History

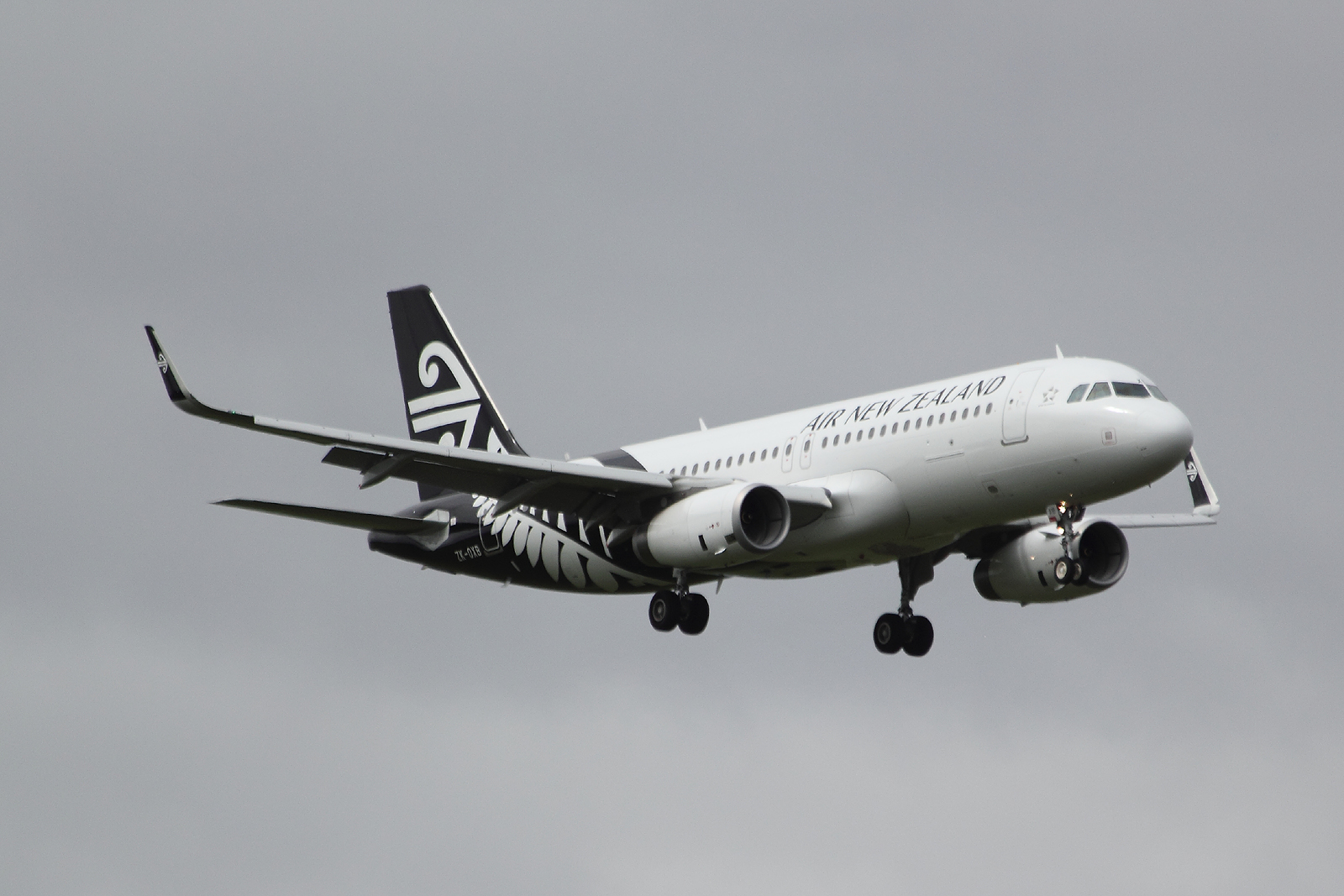
Air New Zealand's Airbus A320s currently operate short-haul routes, both domestically and internationally.

The history of aviation in New Zealand began in the late 19th century when balloon flights began. In the first decade of the 20th century, several New Zealanders began developing heavier-than-air craft. The first confirmed powered flight in New Zealand being made by Richard Pearse in 1902 though is considered uncontrolled.

The First World War spurred the development of aviation in New Zealand. A flying school was established and several hundred New Zealanders went on to serve in British flying services in Europe.

After the war, the civil aviation industry began to take shape as aero clubs became active from the late 1920s and Trans-Tasman flights were attempted. The first major commercial aviation company, Union Airways of New Zealand, began services in 1936. Meanwhile, the nation had established its own air service, the Royal New Zealand Air Force, and during the Second World War it played a significant part in the country's contributions to the Allied war effort with thousands of New Zealanders being trained under the Empire Air Training Scheme and serving in Europe, the Mediterranean and the Pacific as part of both mixed Commonwealth formations and primarily New Zealand-manned squadrons.

In the post war years, the RNZAF acquired jet fighters, helicopters, maritime patrol and transport aircraft. The civil aviation industry also continued to grow with the national carrier, Air New Zealand, being formed in the 1960s, operating alongside smaller operators domestically, and internationally.

== Pioneer aviation ==
New Zealand saw its first balloon flights in 1889. In 1894, a young American woman, Leila Adair, toured New Zealand, attracting large crowds to watch her parachute from a hot-air balloon. The first recorded aviation fatality came in 1899, when David Mahoney, known as 'Captain Lorraine' perished after his balloon was blown out to sea off Lyttelton.

Several New Zealanders came close to building and flying heavier-than-air craft in the first decade of the twentieth century. Richard Pearse, working in isolation in South Canterbury, built a monoplane powered by a two-cylinder engine. He may have attempted flights as early as 1901, and there is contested evidence that he made a significant powered 'hop' in 1903, before the Wright Brothers.

Herbert Pither built a plane at Invercargill in 1910, but was apparently unsuccessful in achieving sustained flights in tests there and at Timaru. Arthur Schaef made short powered hops in his first aircraft, the New Zealand Vogel, at Lyall Bay, Wellington, in 1911. The engine from this aircraft was later used in successful flights in the Wairarapa by Percy Fisher in 1913. The first confirmed powered flight in New Zealand was made by Vivian Walsh in 1911. Vivian Walsh and his brother Leo imported and assembled a Howard Wright 1909 Biplane, which Vivian Flew at Papakura on 5 February 1911.

== First World War ==
The First World War spurred the development of aviation in New Zealand. The Walsh brothers established the New Zealand Flying School at Kohimarama on Auckland Harbour, using flying boats to train over 100 pilots. Henry Wigram established the Canterbury Aviation Company at Sockburn, Christchurch. The company imported some aeroplanes and built more, and trained 182 pilots. Some 800 New Zealanders served with the Royal Flying Corps, Royal Naval Air Service and Royal Air Force during the war, 80% of those serving as aircrew. A further 60 New Zealanders served with the Australian Flying Corps. Twelve New Zealanders became squadron leaders and fifteen were considered to be aces, including Keith Park, Keith Caldwell, Harold Beamish, Clive Collett and Arthur Coningham. William Rhodes-Moorhouse, of New Zealand parentage, became the first airman to be awarded the Victoria Cross.

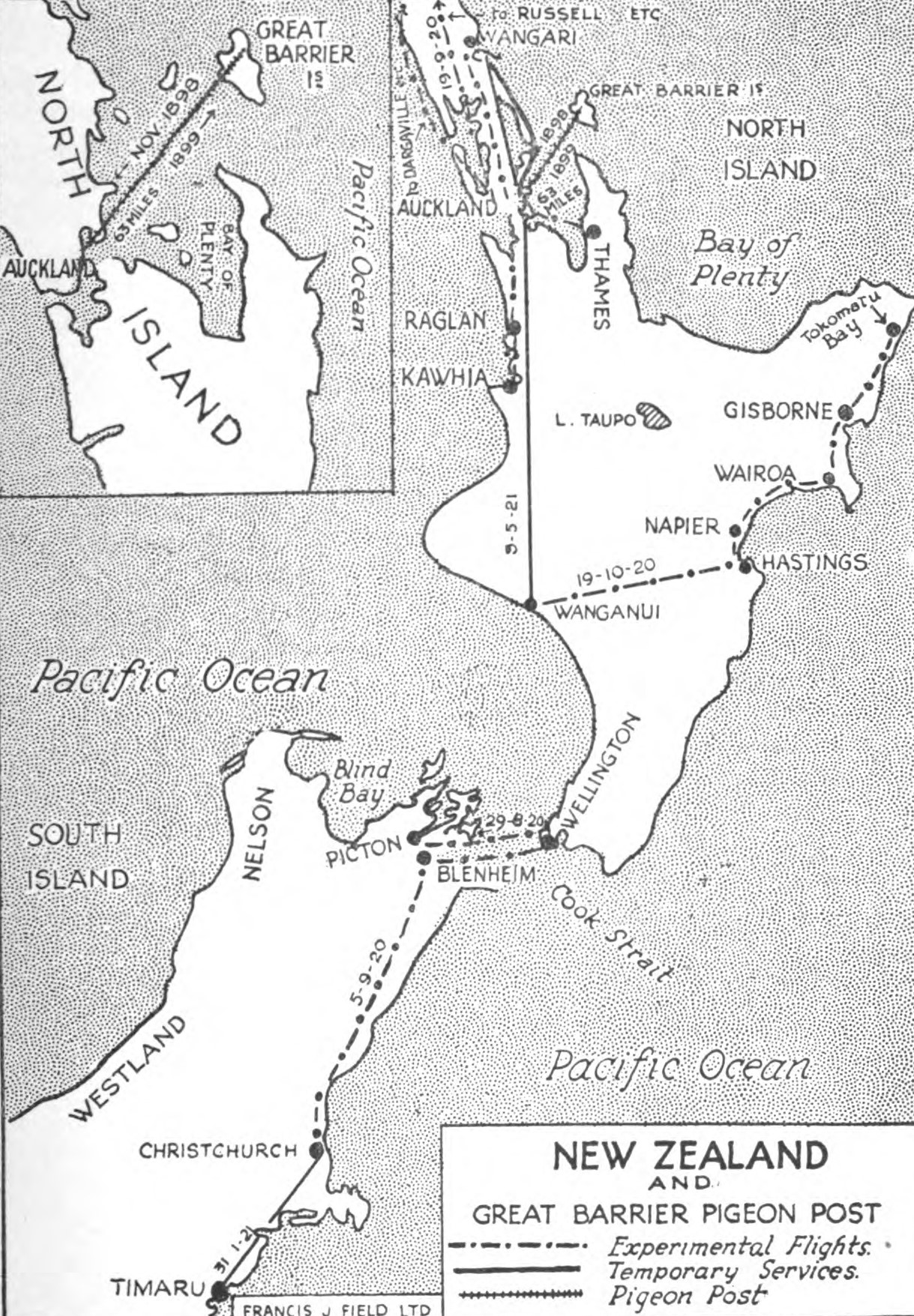
Air routes of New Zealand in 1925

== Developing civil aviation ==
Regulation of civil aviation was provided by a 1919 act of Parliament, which provided for registration of aircraft and licensing of pilots, flying schools, and personnel, as well as the registration of aircraft, and other matters. Aero clubs became active from the late 1920s, and the government provided some training aircraft and subsidies. Commercial aviation also began in the 1920s with some short-lived operations. The first major company was Union Airways of New Zealand, which began services in 1936 between Palmerston North and Dunedin via Blenheim and Christchurch. By 1939 the company was flying between Auckland, New Plymouth, Palmerston North, Wellington, Christchurch and Dunedin.

Trans-Tasman flights were attempted from the late 1920s. John Moncrieff and George Hood disappeared while making an attempt in early 1928. Later that year, Charles Kingsford Smith and his crew flew from Sydney to Christchurch. Further flights across the Tasman followed, and by 1940 Tasman Empire Airways Limited (TEAL), jointly owned by Union Airways, Imperial Airways, Qantas Empire Airways, and the New Zealand Government was able to start scheduled services. Flying boat services across the Pacific to the United States were also developed by TEAL and Pan Am.

== Establishment of the Royal New Zealand Air Force ==
New Zealand received a number of surplus military aircraft from the United Kingdom after the First World War as part of the Imperial Gift. The New Zealand Permanent Air Force was established in 1923, as part of the New Zealand Army. Bases were established at Wigram in Christchurch and Hobsonville in Auckland. A British mission led by Ralph Cochrane in 1936 led to the establishment of the separate Royal New Zealand Air Force in 1937, with Cochrane as the first Chief of Staff. New aircraft were ordered, and bases developed at Ohakea and Whenuapai as part of a new government focus on aerial defences.

== Second World War ==
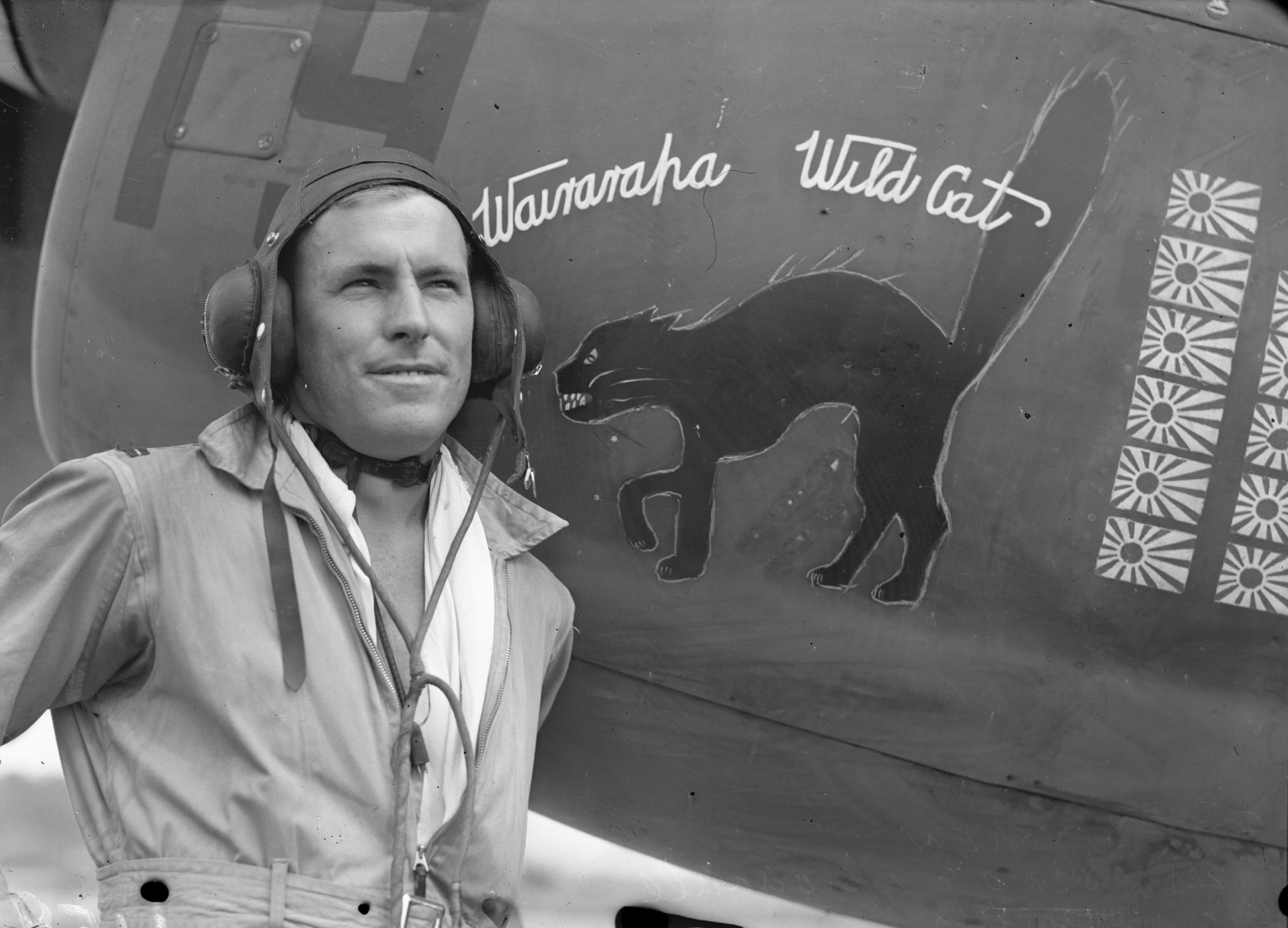
Geoff Fisken

At the outbreak of war in 1939, the RNZAF was awaiting the delivery of 30 Vickers Wellington bombers. These aircraft, and crews, were offered back to the United Kingdom, and became No. 75 Squadron RAF. New Zealand became a major source of aircrew for the RAF, forming part of the Empire Air Training Scheme. The RNZAF itself expanded dramatically, to over thirty squadrons, many of which saw operational service in the Pacific.

A number of New Zealanders enjoyed successful RAF careers. Keith Park commanded the key No. 11 Group during the Battle of Britain. Aces during the Battle of Britain included Edgar Kain, Colin Gray and Alan Deere. Arthur Coningham commanded the Desert Air Force and later 2nd Tactical Air Force during the Normandy landings. New Zealand pilots were awarded three VCs, to James Allen Ward, Leonard Trent and Lloyd Trigg. In the Pacific, RNZAF aces included Geoff Fisken. Arthur Coningham (RAF officer)

== Postwar civil aviation ==
There had been some experiments with aerial topdressing in the 1930s and these continued after the war. By the early 1950s over thirty firms were operating, mainly using the de Havilland Tiger Moth. Specialist aircraft were developed, starting with the Fletcher Fu24, from an American design. Pacific Aerospace produced the Fletcher and other later designs. TEAL had maintained its trans-Tasman service during the war. After the war, its flying boats serviced the Coral Route to Tahiti via Fiji, Samoa and the Cook Islands from 1951 to 1960. TEAL became fully owned by the New Zealand government in 1961, and became Air New Zealand in 1965.

Union Airways was merged into the government-owned New Zealand National Airways Corporation (NAC) in 1945. NAC took over other private interests, and expanded air services nationwide. Main aircraft types operated by NAC included the Douglas DC-3, de Havilland Heron, Vickers Viscount, Fokker F27, and the Boeing 737. Straits Air Freight Express (SAFE Air) was established in 1950 as a specialist freight carrier across Cook Strait, operating the Bristol Type 170 Freighter Mk.31. SAFE Air was bought by NAC in 1972 and became a separate maintenance operation under Air New Zealand before being sold in 2015. NAC was merged into Air New Zealand in 1978 to form one government-owned airline for domestic and international services.

== Postwar RNZAF ==
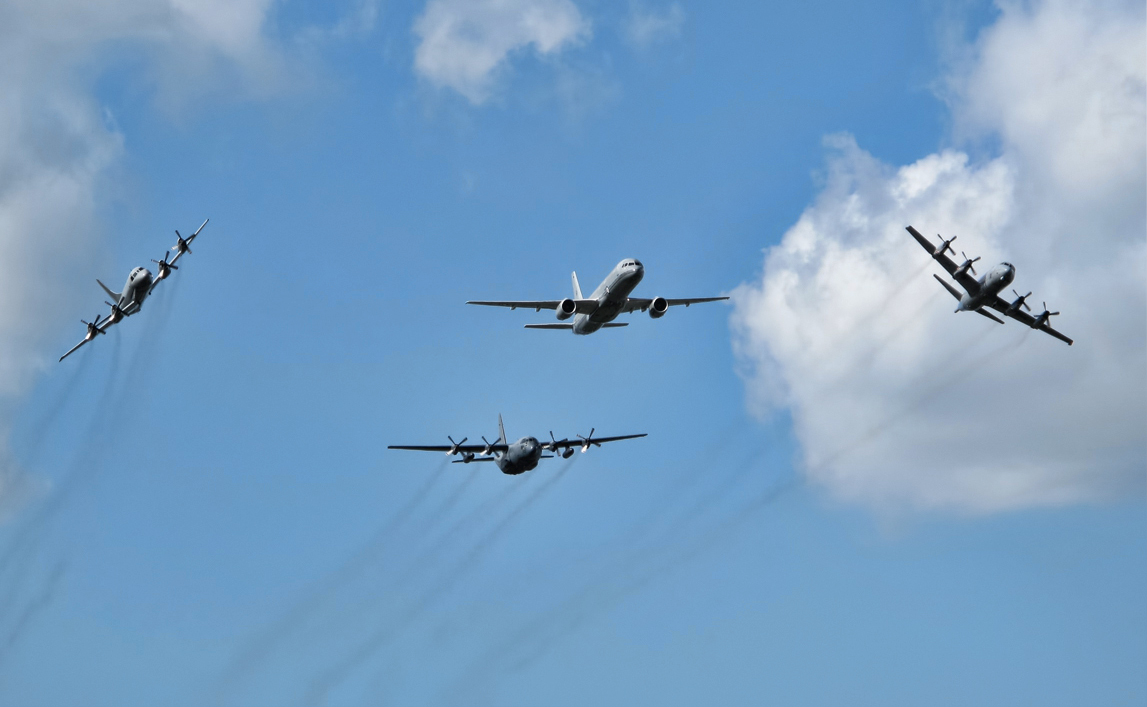
40 Squadron Boeing 757-200 and C-130H Hercules flanked by 5 Squadron P-3K Orions breaking formation during the Whenuapai air show in March 2009.

RNZAF units were deployed with the occupation force in Japan, to Cyprus and during the Malayan Emergency. Jet aircraft were acquired, firstly the de Havilland Vampire and then the English Electric Canberra. Maritime patrols were maintained with the Short Sunderland while transport squadrons were equipped with the C-47 Dakota and the Bristol Freighter. A major re-equipment programme in the 1960s saw the RNZAF acquire the A-4 Skyhawk, P-3B Orions, C-130 Hercules and UH-1 Iroquois. In the early 2000s, New Zealand ceased operating jet fighter aircraft when the Skyhawks were phased out and not replaced.

== See also ==
- Airways New Zealand
- Civil Aviation Authority of New Zealand
- Gliding New Zealand
