= Auckland City =

Coordinates: 36.873°S 174.755°E

- Former territorial authority area of New Zealand
- Flag Coat of arms
- Motto: Advance
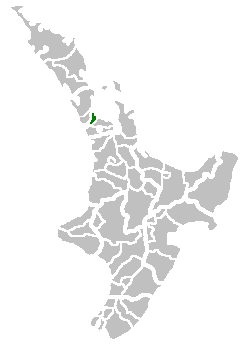
- Auckland City's location in the North Island

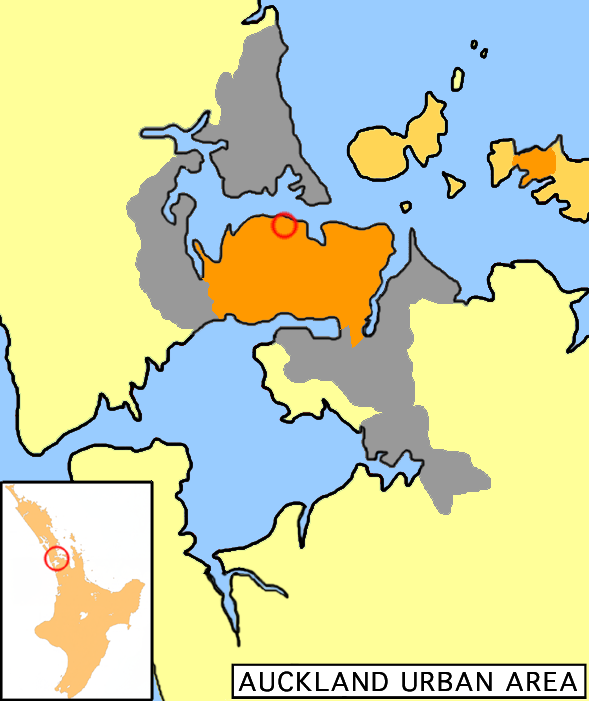
- Auckland City's urban areas (in orange) within the greater Auckland urban region (grey). The city centre is ringed. Auckland City also encompassed islands of the inner (upper right) and outer Hauraki Gulf.
- Country: New Zealand
- Region: Auckland
- Founded: 1871
- Final extent formed: 1989
- Disestablished: 1 November 2010
- Seat: Auckland CBD

Government
  - Type: Territorial authority
  - Body: Auckland City Council
  - Mayor: John Banks (final holder)

Area
  - Total: 637 km^{2} (246 sq mi)
- Time zone: UTC+12 (NZST)
  - Summer (DST): UTC+13 (NZDT)
- Area code: 09
- Website: www.aucklandcity.govt.nz (archived)

Auckland City refers to two former territorial authorities based around Auckland, New Zealand. The first Auckland City, also known as the City of Auckland, existed from 1871 until the 1989 local government reforms when it was replaced with an eponymous authority that covered the whole Auckland isthmus, which lasted until 2010 when it was replaced with the region wide Auckland Council. The post-1989 authority was governed by the Auckland City Council and by the larger Auckland Regional Council.

The territory of Auckland grew from just covering the central business district to encompass suburbs such as Ponsonby and Parnell, although several suburbs remained independent boroughs until the 1989 local government reforms, when the nascent Auckland City was constituted as covering the entire isthmus and islands within the Hauraki Gulf such as Waiheke.

== City of Auckland (1871–1989) ==
=== History ===
Auckland was constituted a city On 24 April 1871 under The Municipal Corporations Act, 1867 by Parliament. Previously Auckland was an independent borough.

The boundaries of Auckland were Stanley Street, Symonds Street, Karangahape Road, Ponsonby Road, and Franklin Road. It was initially 623 acres (252 ha) in size. In 1882 it more than doubled in size by amalgamating the neighbouring highway districts of Ponsonby, Karangahape, and Grafton. The boundaries remained static until a period of multiple amalgamations between 1913 and 1921 resulted in an increase to 7,844 acres (3,174 ha), an almost five-fold increase. These amalgamations were: 15 February 1913, Parnell Borough; 1 April 1913, Arch Hill Road District; 1 July 1914, Grey Lynn Borough; 1 March 1915, Remuera Road District; 1 October 1915, Eden Terrace Road District; 1 February 1917, Epsom Road District; 1 April 1918 188 acres (76 ha) from West Tamaki Road District, to incorporate lake St John; 1 March 1921; 1 March 1921, Point Chevalier Road District. Further amalgamations included Avondale Borough on 1 September 1927, West Tamaki and Orakei Road District on 1 April 1928. From 1928 to 1971 the city did not change boundaries except for harbour reclamations and the inclusion of the Auckland Domain and the loss of 9 acres (3.6 ha) to the Newmarket Borough. By this point the city covered 18,500 acres (7,500 ha).

By 1971 the city stretched from the Whau River in the West to the Tamaki River in the East; however, the city did not cover the entire Auckland isthmus due to the existence of several independent boroughs.

=== Wards ===
The City of Auckland used wards for electoral purposes from 1878 to 1903. Initially the city had three wards: East, West, and North, after the amalgamation of Ponsonby, Karangahape, and Grafton these districts were included as wards. In 1901 the Karangahape ward was abolished as the Municipal Corporations Act 1900 imposed a limit of 5 wards.

== Coat of arms ==
Coat of arms of Auckland City
Notes Auckland City adopted a coat of arms in 1911. The blazon is: Crest Issuant out of a Mural Crown Or a representation of the Phormium tenax flowered proper. Escutcheon Argent, upon waves of the sea a two-masted ship in full sail proper flagged Gules, on a chief per pale Azure and Gules to the dexter a Cornucopia Or, to the sinister a Shovel surmounted by a Pick, in Saltire proper. Supporters On either side an Apteryx (or Kiwi) proper. Motto Advance Symbolism The ship is intended to symbolise Auckland City's relationship with the sea as a major port, while the cornucopia symbolises agricultural productivity and the pick and shovel symbolise early mining activities in the Auckland Province.

== Auckland City (1989–2010) ==
=== Geography ===
The mainland part of Auckland City occupied the Auckland isthmus, also known as the Tāmaki isthmus. The Waitematā Harbour, which opens to the Hauraki Gulf, separated North Shore City from the isthmus. The Manukau Harbour, which opens to the Tasman Sea, separated Manukau City from the isthmus. The distance between the two harbours is particularly narrow at each end of the isthmus. At the western end, the Whau River, an estuarial arm of the Waitematā Harbour, comes within two kilometres of the waters of the Manukau Harbour on the west coast and marks the beginning of the Northland Peninsula. A few kilometres to the southeast at Ōtāhuhu, the Tāmaki River, an arm of the Hauraki Gulf on the east coast, comes just 1200 metres from the Manukau's waters. Being part of the Auckland volcanic field, much of the isthmus is mantled with volcanic rocks and soils, and several prominent scoria cones dot the isthmus.

Many Hauraki Gulf islands were part of Auckland City. Such islands of the inner gulf included Rangitoto, Motutapu, Browns Island, Motuihe, Rakino, Ponui and Waiheke, while the outer gulf islands included Little Barrier Island, Great Barrier and the Mokohinau Islands.

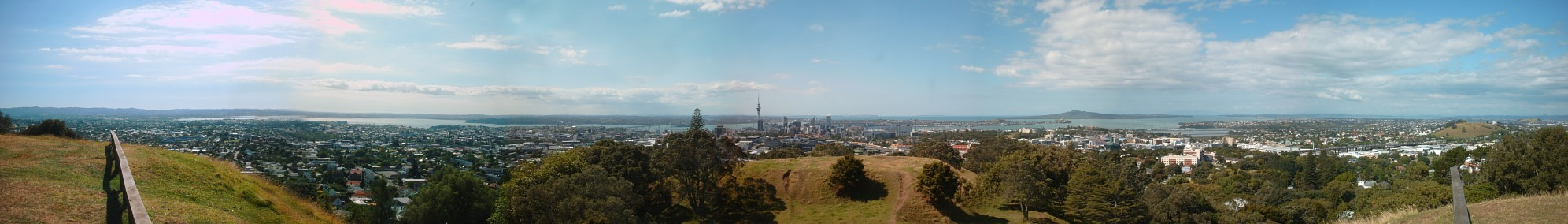
View of part of Auckland City from Maungawhau / Mount Eden

=== Local government ===
In November 1989, central government restructured local authorities throughout New Zealand. After substantial protests and legal challenges, Auckland City was merged with eight smaller local authorities to form a new Auckland City Council. The new Auckland City had double the population of the old. However, amalgamation, forced onto local authorities often against their will, was criticised to have led to less democracy and higher rates for the same services.

A further restructuring and amalgamation brought all seven councils in the area and the Auckland Regional Council into one "SuperCity" (Auckland Council), starting 1 November 2010.

=== Demography ===
Auckland City was the most populous local authority in the country, with a population of 450,300 at 30 June 2010. In 2010 it was made up of 188 ethnic groups, making it New Zealand's most diverse city, and slightly more diverse than in 2007, when 185 ethnic groups had been counted. In 2010, the life expectancy was 83 years for women, and 79.6 years for men, while the average age of the population was 33.4 years, with 35.9 years for the whole country.

=== Economy ===
In the year to March 2009, Auckland City had 353,000 jobs, of which 26.3% was held by property and business services, as well as 65,655 businesses, making up 13.1% of New Zealand's businesses and 16.2% of New Zealand's jobs. Over 2009 to the month of March, Auckland City's unemployment rate increased to 5.6%, compared to the overall New Zealand unemployment rate of 4.5%. In addition the city's economic output declined by 2.4%. Gareth Stiven, the economic manager of Auckland City, stated that this was because the city's economy was heavily involved with service industries, such as banking and insurance, which were affected by financial crises. However, over the last five years of its existence, Auckland's economic growth averaged 1.4% each year, higher than the average of the region and the nation.

In 2003 three of the ten largest companies in New Zealand (Air New Zealand, Fletcher Building, and Foodstuffs) were headquartered in Auckland City. Many large corporations were housed within Auckland CBD, the central part of Auckland City.

Air New Zealand has its worldwide headquarters, called "The Hub", off Beaumont and Fanshawe Streets in the Western Reclamation; the airline moved there from the Auckland CBD in 2006. In September 2003 Air New Zealand was the only one of the very largest corporations in New Zealand to have its headquarters within the Auckland CBD.

=== Administrative divisions ===
Auckland City was divided into seven wards; each of them consisting of the following areas, that were arranged electorally, starting from the west: (Note: For the suburbs of the other cities within the Auckland urban area, see North Shore, Manukau, Waitakere and Papakura.)

- Avondale-Roskill Ward:
  - Avondale Community Board:
    - Waterview
    - Avondale
    - New Windsor
    - Blockhouse Bay
    - Rosebank
  - Mount Roskill Community Board:
    - Wesley
    - Three Kings
    - Mount Roskill
    - Lynfield
    - Waikōwhai
    - Hillsborough
- Eden–Albert Ward:
  - Mount Albert
  - Morningside
  - Mount Eden
  - Eden Terrace (Note: Was part of Hobson Ward until 2007.)
  - Balmoral
  - Owairaka
  - Sandringham
  - Epsom South
  - Kingsland
  - Saint Lukes
- Western Bays Ward:
  - Point Chevalier
  - Westmere
  - Herne Bay
  - Ponsonby
  - Western Springs
  - Grey Lynn
  - Newton
  - Freemans Bay
  - Saint Marys Bay
- Hobson Ward:
  - Auckland (Note: Otherwise known as Auckland Central or Auckland CBD.)
  - Parnell
  - Remuera
  - Epsom North
  - Greenlane
  - Newmarket
  - Mechanics Bay
  - Grafton
- Eastern Bays Ward:
  - Ōrākei
  - Mission Bay
  - Kohimarama
  - Saint Heliers
  - Glendowie
  - Meadowbank
  - Saint Johns
  - Stonefields
- Tamaki–Maungakiekie Ward:
  - Tamaki Community Board:
    - Glen Innes
    - Point England
    - Tāmaki
    - Panmure
    - Mount Wellington
    - Ōtāhuhu
    - Westfield
    - Sylvia Park
  - Maungakiekie Community Board:
    - One Tree Hill
    - Ellerslie
    - Royal Oak
    - Onehunga
    - Penrose
    - Te Papapa
    - Oranga
    - Southdown
- Hauraki Gulf Ward:
  - Great Barrier Community Board:
    - Tryphena
    - Okupu
    - Whangaparapara
    - Port Fitzroy
    - Ōkiwi
    - Claris
    - Medlands
    - Awana Bay
    - Harataonga
    - Kaitoke Beach
    - Medlands Beach
    - Motairehe
    - Palmers Beach
    - Whangapoua Beach
  - Waiheke Community Board:
    - Oneroa
    - Blackpool
    - Palm Beach
    - Surfdale
    - Ostend
    - Onetangi
    - Whakanewha
    - Ōmiha
    - Matiatia
    - Orapiu

=== Sister cities and friendship cities ===
Auckland City had six sister cities and two friendship city relationships. All of these cities except Hamburg (Germany) and Galway (Ireland) are located around the Pacific Rim.

- Sister cities
- Brisbane, Queensland, Australia
- Guangzhou, Guangdong, China
- Hamburg, Germany
- (Republic of Ireland) Galway, Ireland
- Fukuoka, Fukuoka Prefecture, Japan
- Busan, South Korea
- Los Angeles, California, United States
- Taichung, Taiwan
- Friendship cities
- Tomioka, Fukushima, Japan
- Shinagawa, Tokyo, Japan

== See also ==
- Auckland waterfront
