= Barrier Air =

Airline of New Zealand

IATA	ICAO	Call sign
—	GBA	BARRIER
- Founded: 1983
- Fleet size: 6
- Destinations: 6
- Headquarters: Auckland, New Zealand
- Website: http://www.barrierair.kiwi

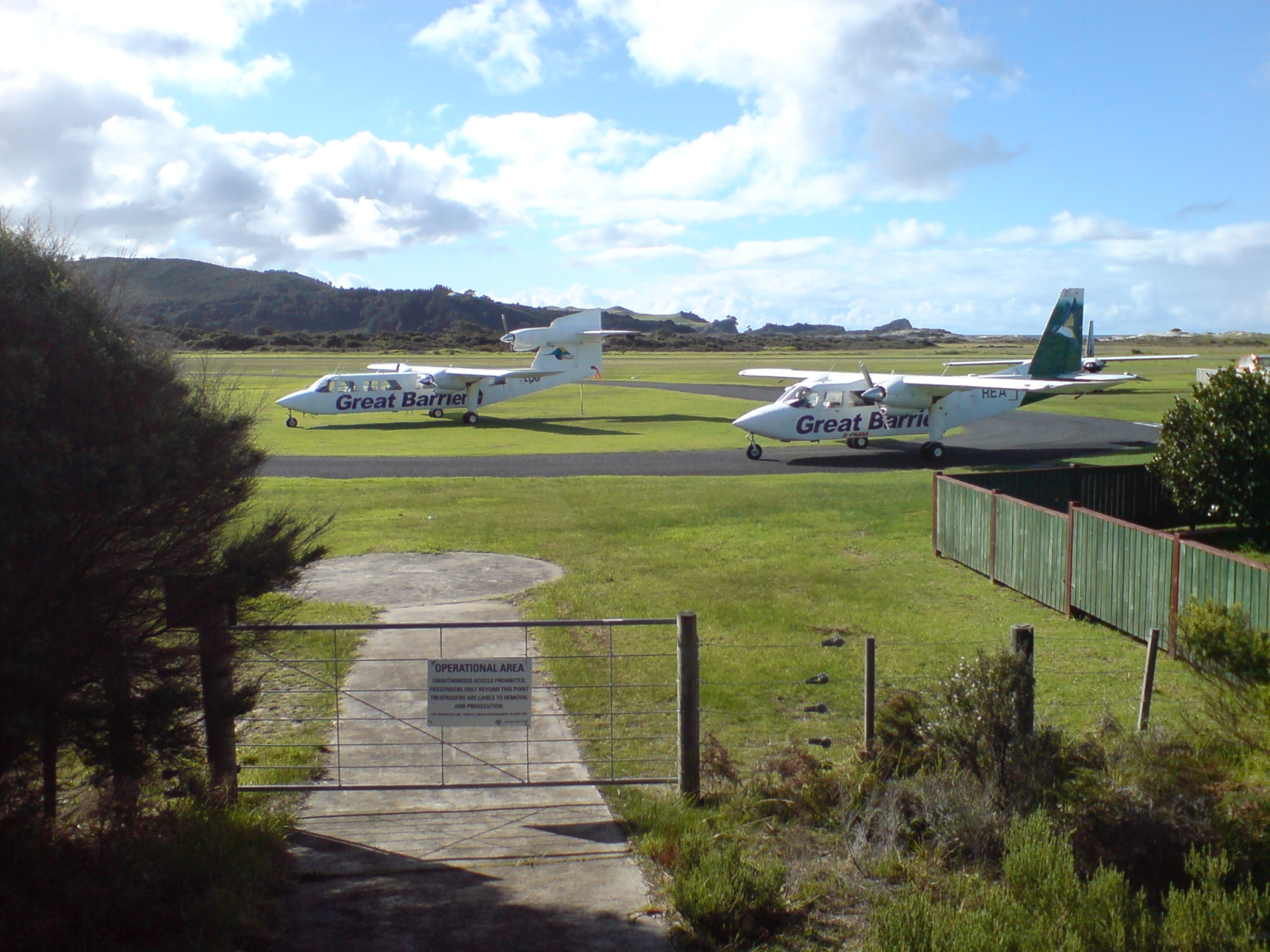
Former aircraft of the airline at the Claris Aerodrome in June 2008

Barrier Air is a New Zealand airline that was established in 1983 by Jim Bergman as Great Barrier Airlines. The head office is located at the Domestic Terminal at Auckland Airport in Māngere, with additional offices in the terminal buildings at Great Barrier Aerodrome, Kaitaia Airport and North Shore Aerodrome.

== History ==
The airline's initial fleet was one Cessna 172, one Cessna 206 and one vintage three-engine de Havilland Australia DHA-3 Drover. Bergman flew the first scheduled service to Great Barrier Island on 2 December 1983, departing from Ardmore Airport, three nautical miles southeast of Manurewa in Auckland. The company initially operated three flights a day from Ardmore to Auckland International and on to Great Barrier Aerodrome at Claris. In July 1984 the airline started flights to Okiwi Airfield on Great Barrier Island as well. The first Britten Norman Islander was introduced in December 1984.

The first flights to Whangārei from its Auckland base began in August 1987. The airline briefly served Waiheke island, from August 1994 to April 1995. They also purchased a subsidiary company, Air Coromandel, in 1995, which had sole commercial rights to Whitianga. In November 1996 Rotorua (served via Tauranga) and Paihia were added to the network. The Rotorua flight was extended to Taupō in November 1998. A new aircraft type was added, the Britten Norman Trislander starting services on 24 December 2002. Since then three other Trislanders have served in the fleet.

In early 2015, coinciding with a change in management, and the purchase of an ex-Bering Air Cessna Grand Caravan, the name of the airline was changed from Great Barrier Airlines to Barrier Air. The airline now operates a fleet of Grand Caravans – other aircraft models have been retired.

Barrier Air started a service to Hamilton from Auckland in February 2016 to link with the Kiwi Air service.

For more than two decades, it was in a long-running commercial battle with its main local competitor Fly My Sky, until the latter went into liquidation in 2021. Fly My Sky descended from the Great Barrier division of Mountain Air, and operated at various times under the names Great Barrier Xpress and Great Barrier Air, the latter name being subsequently forbidden by a legal injunction as it was too similar to Great Barrier Airlines, the name of which is now Barrier Air. The competition between the two airlines is considered one of the main reasons for the relatively low flight prices, which as of January 2008 remained almost exactly at 1998 prices, despite a trebling of aviation fuel prices in the nine years of competition between the two airlines.

Barrier Air returned to Whitianga on 15 December 2021 using Cessna Grand Caravan aircraft. On 22 December Barrier Air announced plans to purchase a fifth Cessna Grand Caravan and look at launching new routes such as Auckland to Tauranga, following the success of the new Whitianga to Auckland route. A year later a new air service between Tauranga and Great Barrier Island was launched.

In May 2024 Barrier Air decided to serve Kerikeri from Auckland to introduce competition on the Auckland to Kerikeri Route.

== Current destinations ==
As of April 2026, Barrier Air operate the following routes:

From Auckland

- Claris - Great Barrier Island - Great Barrier Aerodrome
- Kaitaia - Kaitaia Airport
- Whitianga - Whitianga Aerodrome
- Kerikeri - Kerikeri Airport

From Claris - Great Barrier Island (Great Barrier Aerodrome)

- Auckland - Auckland Airport
- Kaitaia - Kaitaia Airport
- North Shore - North Shore Aerodrome
- Tauranga - Tauranga Airport

From Kaitaia

- Auckland - Auckland Airport

From Whitianga

- Auckland - Auckland Airport

From Kerikeri

- Auckland - Auckland Airport

From Tauranga

- Claris - Great Barrier Island - Great Barrier Aerodrome

== Former destinations ==
Barrier Air over the years operated to many former destinations.

- Ardmore - Ardmore Airport
- Hamilton - Hamilton Airport
- Ōkiwi - Okiwi Airfield
- Paihia - Paihia Aerodrome
- Rotorua - Rotorua Airport
- Taupō - Taupō Airport
- Thames - Thames Aerodrome
- Waiheke Island - Waiheke Island Aerodrome
- Whangārei - Whangarei Airport

== Fleet ==
As of October 2022, Barrier Air's fleet consists of the following aircraft:

Barrier Air fleet
Aircraft	In service	Orders	Passengers	Notes
Cessna 208B Caravan	6	—	13	
Total	6	—	—	

Barrier Air (and its predecessor Great Barrier Airlines) formerly operated the following aircraft:

Barrier Air former fleet
Aircraft	Total	Introduced	Retired	Notes
Beechcraft 76 Duchess	1			
Britten-Norman Islander	11	1984	2018	2 leased
Britten-Norman Trislander	4	2002	2014	
Cessna 172	4	1983		
Cessna 206	1	1984		
Cessna 402	1			
Cessna 421	1			
De Havilland DHA-3	1	1984		
De Havilland Canada DHC-6	2	1994		1 leased from Air Fiji
Embraer EMB-820C	1	1994		
GAF N24 Nomad	1	2000		
Partenavia P.68	4	1995	2017	
Piper PA-23 Aztec	3	1985		1 leased
Piper PA-28 Archer	1			
Piper PA-31 Navajo	3		2016	
Piper PA-32 Cherokee Six	4	1984	2012	Two leased from Auckland Aero Club
