= NSAC =

NSAC may refer to:

- National Security Analysis Center, an FBI counter-terrorism initiative
- National Spiritualist Association of Churches
- National Student Athletes Championship, an annual tournament organized by AsiaBasket
- NATO Strategic Airlift Capability
- Nevada Athletic Commission, popularly known as the Nevada State Athletic Commission, a regulatory body for exhibitions of unarmed combat
- North Shore Aero Club, in Auckland, New Zealand
- Nova Scotia Agricultural College, in Nova Scotia, Canada
- National Society for Autistic Children, the former name of the Autism Society of America
