= Kaitoke Beach =

Beach in New Zealand

Coordinates: 36.244737°S 175.479033°E

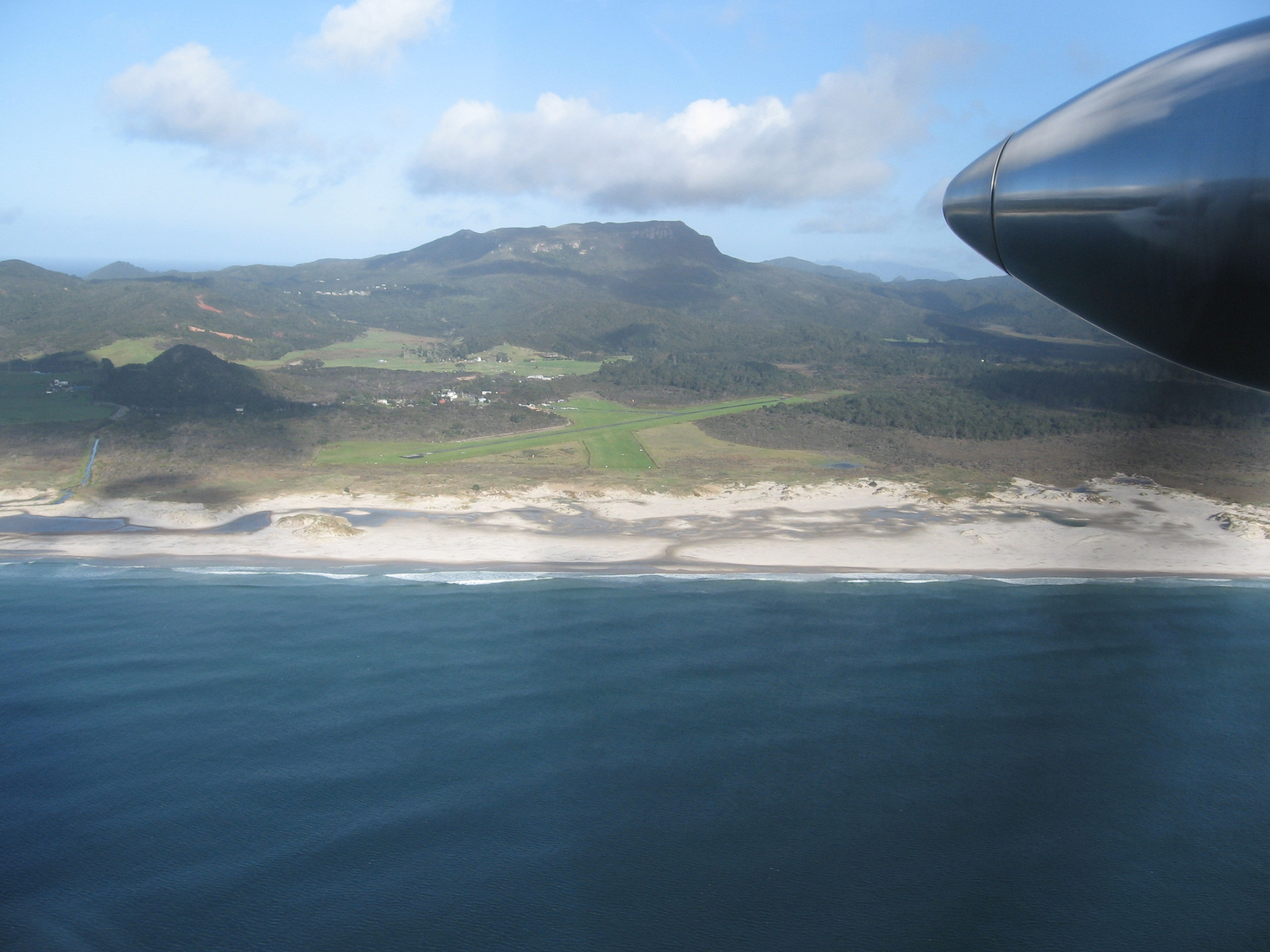
View of Claris and Kaitoke Beach

Kaitoke Beach is a long sandy beach and settlement on the east coast of Great Barrier Island in the Hauraki Gulf of the Auckland Region of New Zealand. At the northern end is the Kaitoke Creek, which drains the Kaitoke Swamp, and a headland, beyond which is Palmers Beach. At the southern end is the Sugar Loaf headland and beyond that Medlands Beach. Kaitoke Beach has golden sand and dunes.

The township of Claris and Great Barrier Aerodrome are near the beach, which can be seen by travellers flying in or out of the aerodrome. Claris has a general store, a New Zealand Post shop, a petrol station and other facilities.

The beach is accessible from Oceanview Road, midway along the beach, and from Sugarloaf Road at the southern end of the beach, where there is a private campground. The beach provides consistent surf throughout the year, with left and right hand waves. It is rarely crowded, but the Aotea Board Riders Club have surf competitions on the beach when conditions allow. There is a risk of rips. Stingrays and hammerhead sharks may be present.

The beach is an important nesting ground for the endangered brown teal and dotterel.

== History ==
In January 2013, a vegetation fire burned over 100 hectares near Claris and Kaitoke Beach. A planned flight departure at the aerodrome was moved to Okiwi Airfield, east of Ōkiwi.
