= Auckland Central =

Auckland Central may refer to the following in Auckland, New Zealand:

- Auckland CBD, the central business district
- The Auckland isthmus, a narrow strip of land including the Auckland CBD and surrounding suburbs
- Auckland Central (New Zealand electorate), a current general electorate
- Auckland City, a former local authority district that includes the central part of the Auckland metropolitan area
