= Dragon Island =

Dragon Island may refer to:

- Dragon Island (New Zealand), in the Auckland Region
- Dragonera, in the Balearic Islands
- Dragon Island, a fictional island in the Narnia world created by C. S. Lewis
- "Dragon Island", an episode of the TV series Pocoyo
