= North Shore Aerodrome =

Aerodrome in New Zealand

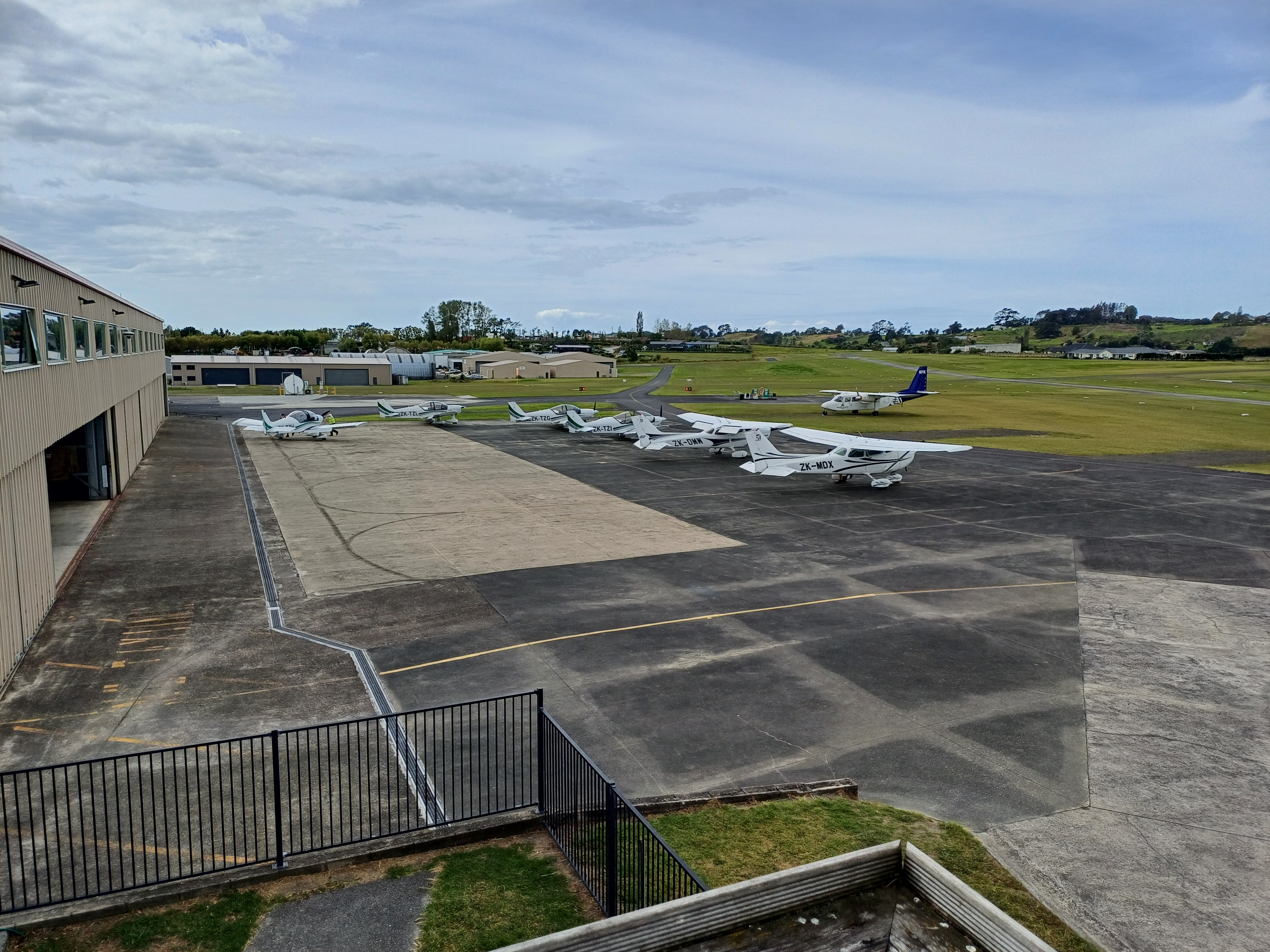
- IATA: none; ICAO: NZNE

Summary
- Airport type: Public
- Operator: North Shore Aero Club (Inc)
- Serves: Auckland
- Location: Dairy Flat
- Elevation AMSL: 212 ft (65 m)
- Coordinates: 36°39′24″S 174°39′19″E
- Website: www.northshoreairport.co.nz
- Interactive map of North Shore Aerodrome

Runways
Direction	Length		Surface
Direction	ft	m	Surface
03/21	2,595	791	Concrete
09/27	1,837	560	Gravel

North Shore Aerodrome (ICAO: NZNE), also called North Shore Airport and Dairy Flat Airfield, is a small, uncontrolled aerodrome located 2 nmi (3.7 km) south southwest of Silverdale, near Auckland, on New Zealand's North Island.

== Operational information ==
- Lighting (pilot activated)
- Curfew 2200 to 0700 HR local.
- Jet A1/Avgas 100, Swipecard

The aerodrome is operated by North Shore Aero Club (Inc), which is a member of the Royal New Zealand Aero Club.

== Airlines and destinations ==
Barrier Air connects North Shore Aerodrome to Great Barrier Aerodrome (Claris).

Past operators of regular services through North Shore Airport were the North Shore Aero Club, NZ Air Services, Great Barrier Airlines and Fly My Sky, all operating to Great Barrier Island; Salt Air, operating to Whangarei and Kerikeri; Flight Hauraki, operating to Whangarei, Kerikeri and Great Barrier Island; North Shore Air, operating to Tauranga and Kerikeri; FlyStark operating to Whitianga; and Sunair operating to Hamilton, Rotorua, and Tauranga.

=== North Shore Aero Club ===
The North Shore Aero Club (NSAC) was founded in 1967, although flying occurred at the site before this. The club's primary trainer is the Robin R2120. Previously it was the Cessna 152. The club also has three Robin R2160s; this aircraft comes with a 160 hp engine and a larger rudder. One of them can be used for aerobatics. They have three Cessna 172s, one with instrument flight rules (IFR) capability. Their twin-engine aircraft is the Beechcraft Duchess, used for multi-engine instrument rating (MEIR) training. The club has Tecnam P2008 as the light sports aircraft. The chief flight instructor is Daryl Gillett.

== See also ==
- List of airports in New Zealand
- List of airlines of New Zealand
- Transport in New Zealand
