= Medlands Beach =

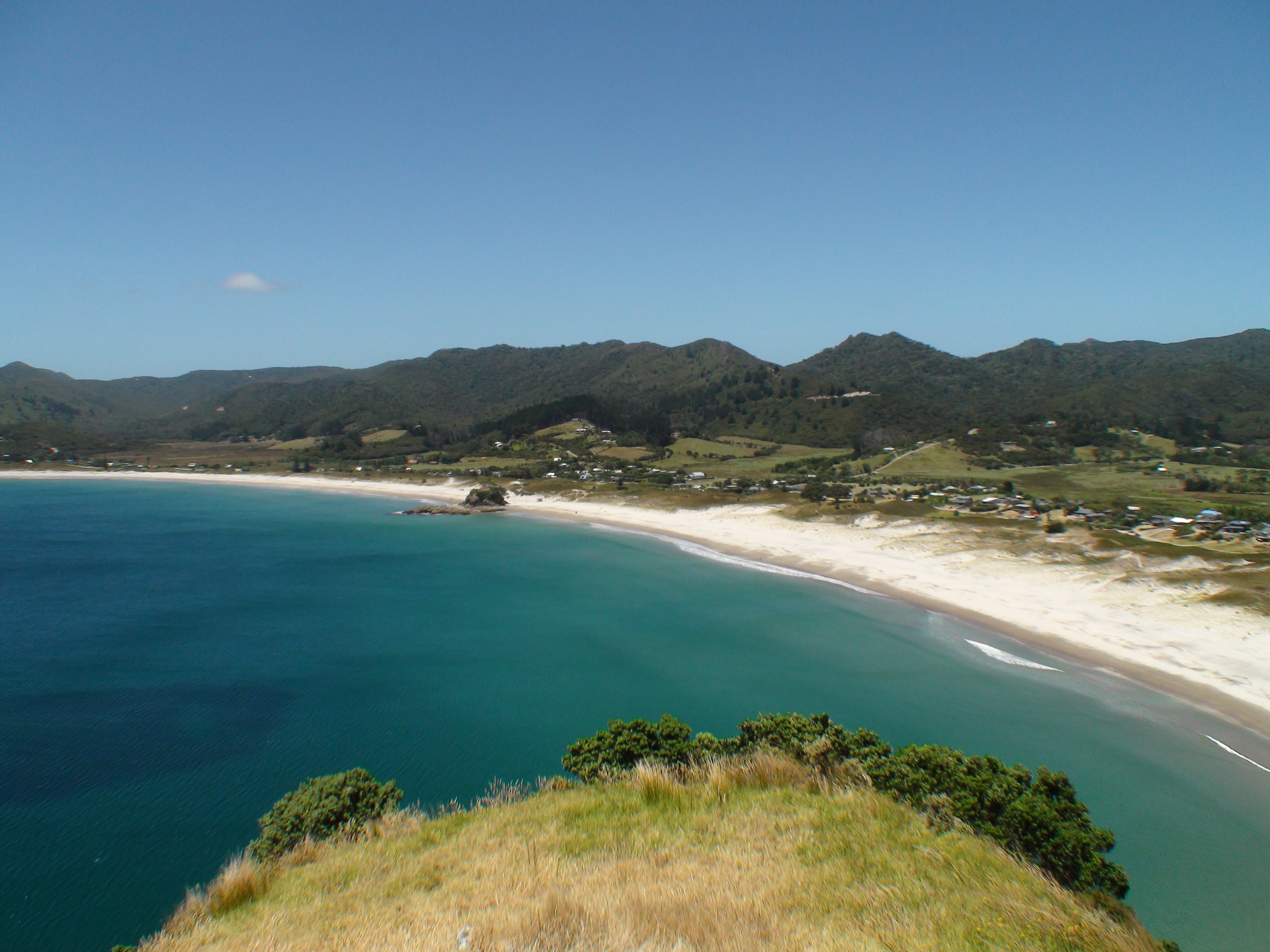
- Medlands Beach, seen from the Sugar Loaf hill
- Interactive map of Medlands Beach
- Coordinates: 36.2658°S 175.4937°E
- Country: New Zealand
- Region: Auckland Region
- Ward: Waitematā and Gulf ward
- Local board: Aotea / Great Barrier Local Board
- Electorates: Auckland Central; Te Tai Tokerau

Government
  - Territorial Authority: Auckland Council
  - Mayor of Auckland: Wayne Brown
  - Auckland Central MP: Chlöe Swarbrick
  - Te Tai Tokerau MP: Mariameno Kapa-Kingi

Area
  - Total: 6.04 km^{2} (2.33 sq mi)

Population (June 2025)
  - Total: 100
  - Density: 17/km^{2} (43/sq mi)

Medlands Beach is a location on the east coast of Great Barrier Island in the Auckland Region of New Zealand. Auckland Council describes it as the most accessible beach on the island. It is one of the island's main tourist areas, but is little developed. The small settlement of Medlands consists of permanent houses and holiday baches, some behind the dunes, sheltered from winds from the sea, and others elevated for a view.

== Geography ==
Medlands Beach is located on the shores of Oruawharo Bay, directly south of Kaitoke Beach, with the Sugar Loaf hill and Pitokuku Island in-between. Sugar Loaf hill offers great views of the beach but is a privately owned farm with cattle and bulls and cannot be climbed without permission from the landowners - the Blackwells. Alternatively, good views of the beach are offered from the road connecting Medlands to Claris. The beach is a "sweep of white sand" 2.1 kilometres long that can be walked both ways in 90 minutes. Halfway along the beach is Memory Rock, also called Medlands Rock, with a short informal walking track to the summit, where there are views across the bay.

At the northern end of the beach is an exposed beach surf break that offers reliable surfing conditions during most of the year. At the south-eastern end of the beach is Shark Alley, a sheltered spot for swimming and launching boats. It has a small stream with several pāteke (brown teal ducks) and a Department of Conservation campsite which can host up to 120 people from Christmas until mid-February.

== History ==
In November 1888, photographer Henry Winkelmann purchased 200 acres (81 ha) at Medlands Beach, naming the property Ti Tree Flat.

The settlement has Great Barrier Island's only traditional church building, St John's Community Church, which is used ecumenically. Medlands has a number of accommodation providers, but no grocery stores or food retailers. It is a 4-kilometre drive from Great Barrier Aerodrome and Claris, which has a general store, a New Zealand Post shop, a petrol station and other facilities.

== Demographics ==
Statistics New Zealand describes Medlands Beach as a rural settlement, which covers 6.04 km^{2} (2.33 sq mi) and had an estimated population of 100 as of June 2025, with a population density of 17 people per km^{2}. Medlands Beach is part of the larger Barrier Islands statistical area.

Historical population
Year	Pop.	±% p.a.
2006	96	—
2013	87	−1.40%
2018	75	−2.92%
2023	105	+6.96%

Medlands Beach had a population of 105 in the 2023 New Zealand census, an increase of 30 people (40.0%) since the 2018 census, and an increase of 18 people (20.7%) since the 2013 census. There were 57 males and 45 females in 60 dwellings. 2.9% of people identified as LGBTIQ+. The median age was 58.8 years (compared with 38.1 years nationally). There were 6 people (5.7%) aged under 15 years, 12 (11.4%) aged 15 to 29, 48 (45.7%) aged 30 to 64, and 39 (37.1%) aged 65 or older.

People could identify as more than one ethnicity. The results were 91.4% European (Pākehā); 8.6% Māori; 2.9% Asian; and 2.9% Middle Eastern, Latin American and African New Zealanders (MELAA). English was spoken by 97.1%, and other languages by 8.6%. The percentage of people born overseas was 22.9, compared with 28.8% nationally.

Religious affiliations were 25.7% Christian, 2.9% Hindu, and 2.9% New Age. People who answered that they had no religion were 65.7%, and 5.7% of people did not answer the census question.

Of those at least 15 years old, 18 (18.2%) people had a bachelor's or higher degree, 48 (48.5%) had a post-high school certificate or diploma, and 21 (21.2%) people exclusively held high school qualifications. The median income was $31,100, compared with $41,500 nationally. 6 people (6.1%) earned over $100,000 compared to 12.1% nationally. The employment status of those at least 15 was that 24 (24.2%) people were employed full-time, 24 (24.2%) were part-time, and 3 (3.0%) were unemployed.

== Education ==
Kaitoke School is a coeducational full primary (years 1-8) school with a roll of 53 students as of July 2026. The school was established in 1988, replacing an earlier Kaitoke School.

== Notable residents ==
Jim Allen and Pamela Allen - sculptor and child's book author.
