= Motairehe =

Settlement on Great Barrier Island, New Zealand

Coordinates: 36.11737°S 175.37613°E

Motairehe is a settlement located in Katherine Bay, on the northwestern coast Great Barrier Island, New Zealand. The marae Motairehe Marae and its Whakaruruhau meeting house which are affiliated with Ngātiwai Ki Aotea are located here.

== Marae ==
Motairehe Marae was first proposed in 1878 and opened in 1983. The corresponding wharenui (meeting house) was named Whakaruruhau, (meaning a place of shelter) by Whetu Mcgregor.
