= Katherine Bay, Auckland =

Bay located on the coast of New Zealand

Coordinates: 36.118°S 175.357°E

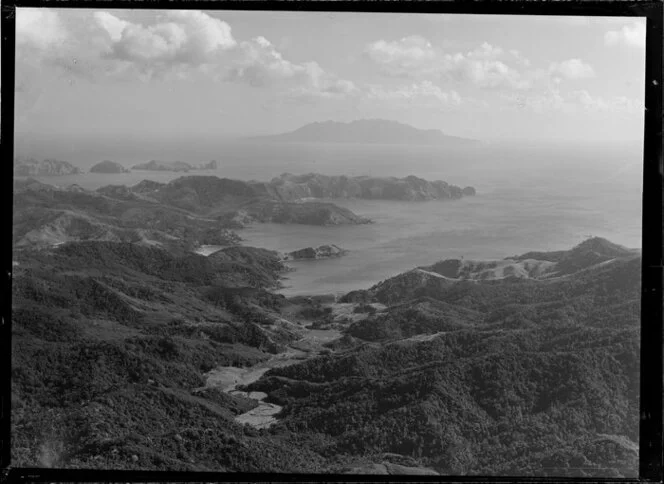
Katherine Bay, as seen from the air

Katherine Bay, alternatively spelt as Catherine Bay, is a bay located on the northwestern coast of Great Barrier Island, New Zealand. The bay was named in 1870 by Captain Nagle after his wife.

== History ==
The area around the bay was originally inhabited by Ngapuhi Māori since 1660.

During the early Colonial era of New Zealand in the mid-19th century extensive private and crown land purchases lead to only two areas of the Hauraki Gulf remained in Māori ownership: Te Huruhi (Surfdale) on Waiheke Island (2100 acres) and a 3,510 acre parcel of land at Katherine Bay on Great Barrier Island.

=== Typhoid epidemic ===
In August 1937 Dr C. B. Gilbard and Mr. W. Armour reported a typhoid epidemic in a native settlement in Katherine Bay which had claimed the lives of three Māori adults and a child.
