= Whangapoua Beach =

Beach on Great Barrier Island

Coordinates: 36.1242°S 175.4228°E

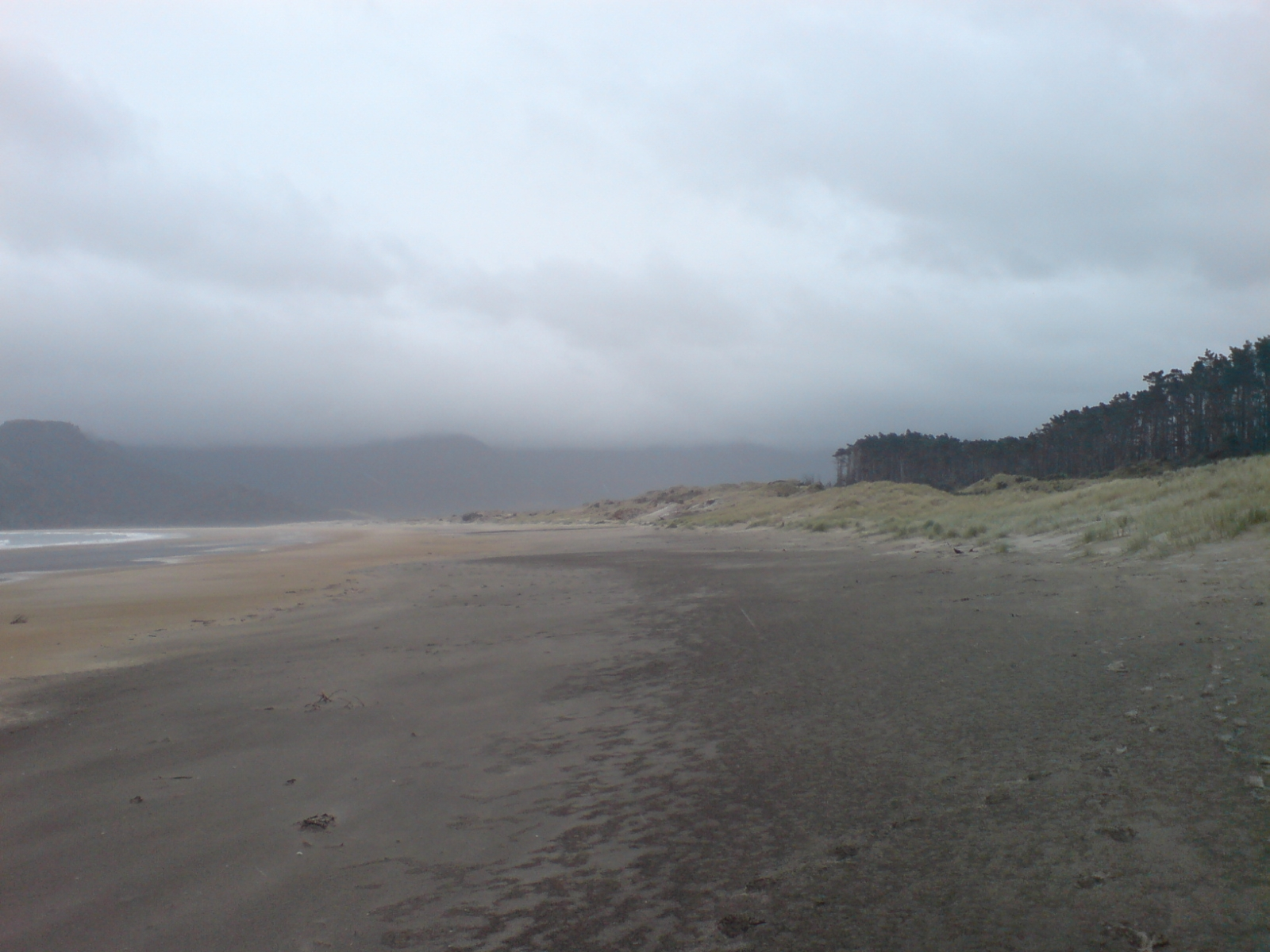
Whangapoua Beach

Whangapoua Beach is on the east coast of Great Barrier Island in New Zealand's Hauraki Gulf. The beach runs roughly north–south and has views of Rakitu Island. The Whangapoua Creek drains large estuarine wetlands and enters the sea at the southern end of the beach.

A Department of Conservation camping ground is on the southern side of the estuary, adjacent to Okiwi Airfield. It is staffed between Christmas Day and Auckland Anniversary Day every year. Dogs are banned from the campsite, and there are no rubbish or recycling facilities. There is access to the northern part of the beach from Mabey Road.

The beach is a surfing spot with a bar break at the mouth of the creek and beach breaks along the length of the beach. The bar break is accessed by walking across the estuary flats from the camping ground.

The nearest settlement is the small locality of Ōkiwi, to the west, at the head of the estuary. The Harataonga Coastal Walkway starts one kilometre south-east of the airfield and runs south-east through regenerating native forest to Harataonga Bay, taking 4–5 hours to walk.

== History ==
Ngātiwai have traditionally lived in the area.

The SS Wairarapa ran aground at Miners Head on 24 October 1894. Survivors who reached land were cared for by Ngātiwai. Many of those who drowned were buried at a grave site at Tapuwai Point at the northern end of Whangapoua Beach, and can be reached by the Wairairapa Graves Walkway.
