= Harataonga =

Bay in Auckland, New Zealand

Coordinates: 36.169228°S 175.484574°E

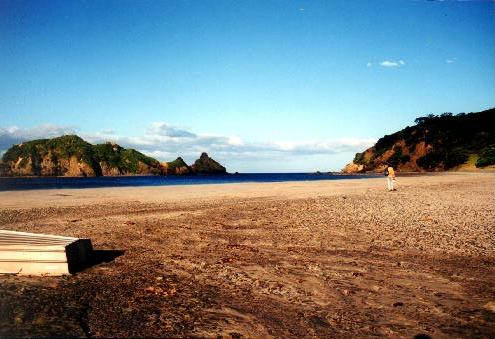
Overtons Beach and Dragon Island (left distance)

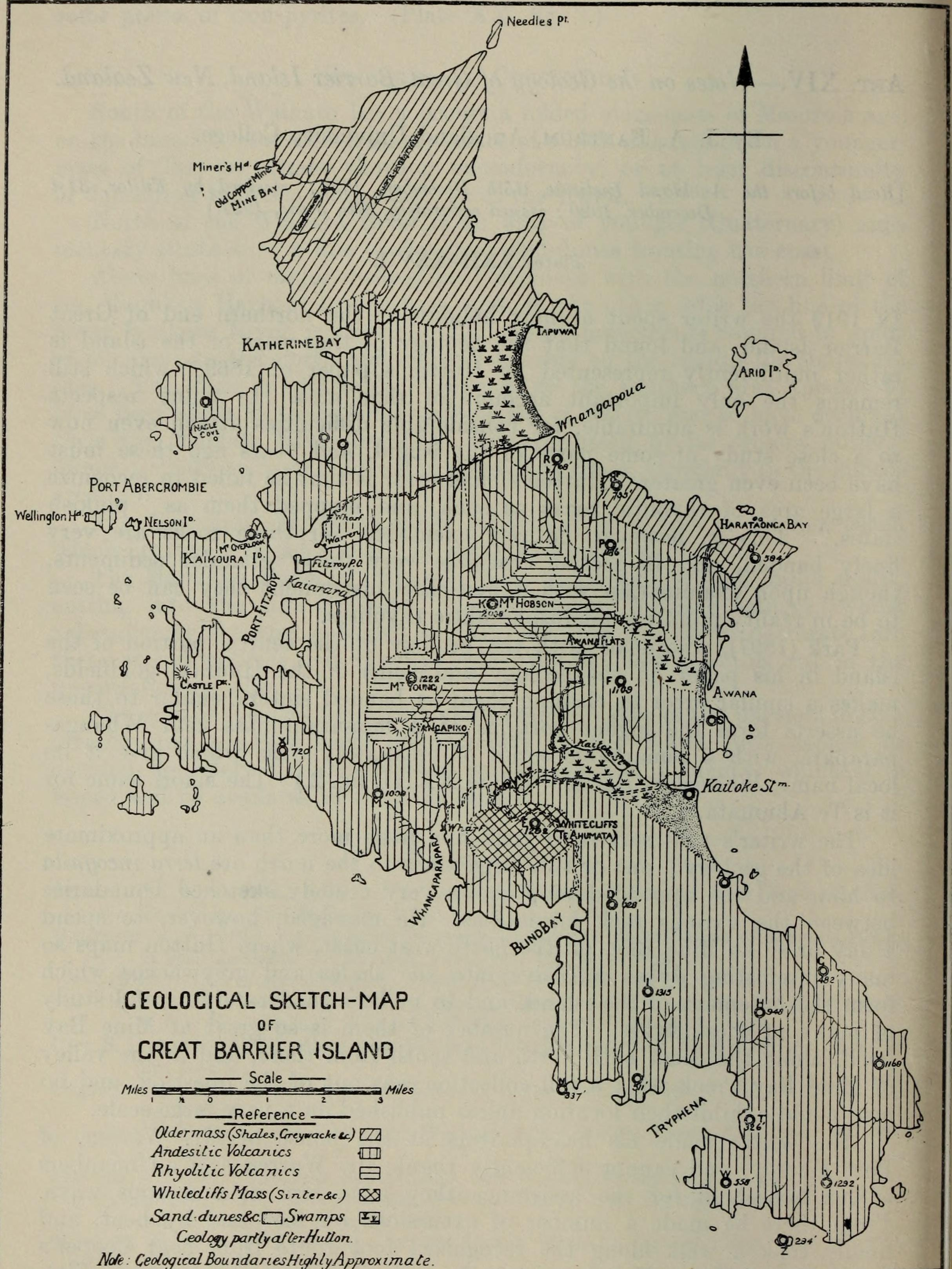
Transactions of the Royal Society of New Zealand (1920)

Harataonga Bay is a coastal feature and area on the northeast coast of Great Barrier Island in New Zealand's Hauraki Gulf, approximately 51 nautical miles northeast of central Auckland. Most of the area is in the Harataonga Recreation Reserve, with some of the hinterland forming the Harataonga Scenic Reserve.

The main beach is the sandy Overtons Beach, also called Harataonga Beach, which runs roughly west to east. The Harataonga Stream flows over the sand at the western end of the beach. There is also a small sandy bay at the northernmost corner of the bay that is only accessible by boat. Dragon Island at the eastern end of the bay provides some protection from the Pacific Ocean from the east and south-east, with further protection provided by the larger Rakitu (Arid) Island to the north.

Road access is by a narrow gravel road. The Department of Conservation runs a campground that is surrounded by farmland and forest 300 metres from the beach. It can accommodate 120 people. The sheltered bay is used for fishing, diving, swimming and snorkelling. Fishing can be done from rock outcrops at each end of Overtons Beach. Vehicle access onto the beach and dogs are both prohibited.

There are two walking tracks: the 30-minute Harataonga Loop Track and the 4–5 hour Harataonga Coastal Walkway that ends near Whangapoua Beach. The tracks run through regenerating forest of mānuka, kānuka, nīkau palms, cabbage trees, and pittosporum that is habitat for birds including grey warbler, kingfisher, kererū (wood pigeon), silvereye, and tūī. The bay is an important nesting area for pāteke (brown teal), New Zealand dotterel, oystercatchers and banded rail.

== History ==
Ngāti Rehua Ngati Wai ki Aotea had been present in the bay before the arrival of European settlers. The area has several Māori historic sites and settler graves.

In 2007, the BBC filmed the reality series Castaway 2007 in Harataonga Bay.
