= Dragon Island (New Zealand) =

Island in New Zealand

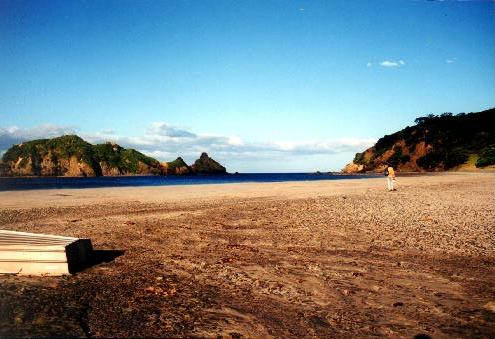
- Dragon Island (left distance) from Overtons Beach in Harataonga Bay
- Interactive map of Dragon Island

Geography
- Coordinates: 36.164°S 175.491°E

Administration
- New Zealand

Demographics
- Population: 0

Dragon Island is a small privately owned island just outside Harataonga Bay, on the northeast coast of Great Barrier Island, located 95 kilometres (59 mi) to the northeast of Auckland, in New Zealand. The island provides Harataonga Bay with shelter from easterly and southeasterly winds by blocking the bay from Pacific storms. The island is in relatively calm water, sheltered by the larger Rakitu Island to the north. It was once farmed but is now unpopulated and has reverted to scrub.

== See also ==
- List of islands of New Zealand
- List of islands
- Desert island
