= Palmers Beach =

Beach in New Zealand

Coordinates: 36.2249°S 175.4782°E

Palmers Beach is on the east coast of Great Barrier Island in New Zealand's Hauraki Gulf.

The beach is busy with swimmers and surfers during summer, but is often deserted during the rest of the year. There are several right-hand and left-hand peaks, suitable for intermediate to expert surfers.

Kaitoke Beach is south of Palmers Beach and Awana Bay is to the north.
