= Kaitaia Airport =

- IATA: KAT; ICAO: NZKT

Summary
- Airport type: Public
- Operator: Far North Holdings Ltd.
- Location: Kaitaia
- Elevation AMSL: 270 ft (82 m)
- Coordinates: 35°04′12″S 173°17′07″E
- Website: kaitaiaairport.co.nz

Map
- Location of airport in Northland

Runways
Direction	Length		Surface
Direction	ft	m	Surface
12/30	4,600	1,402	Asphalt
18/36	4,190	1,277	Gravel

Kaitaia Airport (IATA: KAT, ICAO: NZKT) is located 3 km south-east of Awanui and 5 km north-east of central Kaitaia, in the Far North District of New Zealand. The land is owned by local Māori iwi and leased to the Far North District Council (FNDC), who contracts its Far North Holdings Limited (FNHL) to manage the aerodrome.

== History ==
Kaitaia Aerodrome was originally built for American long-range bombers during World War II so that the aircraft could reach parts of the South Pacific from their base in the Far North.

On 13 June 2005, Kaitaia Airport received an injection of $333,850 to upgrade its runway facilities so that it could accommodate larger aircraft. The Far North District Council approved loan funding for Kaitaia Airport's project to allow it to accommodate aircraft with a pavement classification number PCN 15. This upgrade would allow Air New Zealand to fly into Kaitaia with its Dash 8 and ATR 72 aircraft. During the project, $1.4 million invested into the airport was to provide larger hardstand areas and better terminal facilities.

Kaitaia Airport previously received Beechcraft 1900Ds, operated by Eagle Air on behalf of Air New Zealand, twice daily Monday–Friday and daily Saturday–Sunday. This route was taken over by Barrier Air from 28 April 2015. Other airlines also expressed interest in operating the route, including Tauranga-based Sunair. Barrier Air operated the route with a Cessna Caravan from 28 April 2015. Sunair operated between Kaitaia and Whangārei for doctor runs.

In December 2024 an agreement was signed for the transfer of the airport land from the Crown to the Ngāi Takoto iwi and the Ngāi Tohianga, Patukoraha and Te Paatu hapū of the Ngāti Kahu iwi.

== Aircraft transit ==
Kaitaia Airport is the most northern airfield in New Zealand that has fuel available. It has a long and smooth runway, the longest in Northland, and is used by light aircraft, as well as private aircraft such as the Gulfstream V.

852 km to the north-west of Kaitaia is Norfolk Island Airport, from which it is 754 km to Nouméa in New Caledonia, or 900 km to Lord Howe Island, which can be used as a stepping stone to the Australian mainland. These distances are within the range of many light aircraft fitted with long range tanks, while the direct distances are usually used with the larger private aircraft which are able to land at Kaitaia Airport. From New Caledonia other Pacific Islands such as Vanuatu and Fiji are within range and can be used as further 'stepping stones' to the other South Pacific and North Pacific destinations.

== Airlines and destinations ==
Airlines	Destinations
Barrier Air	Auckland

The airport is home to the Kaitaia Aero Club, which operates a Cessna 162 and offers flight training.

== See also ==
- List of airports in New Zealand
- List of airlines of New Zealand
- Transport in New Zealand
