= National Security Analysis Center =

US law enforcement entity

The National Security Analysis Center (NSAC) is an element of the Federal Bureau of Investigation (FBI). Headquartered in Crystal City, Virginia, just outside of Washington, D.C., the NSAC maintains a library of databases containing more than 1.5 billion government and private-sector records about U.S. citizens and foreigners. The NSAC was created in 2008, and has grown into a 400-person, $150 million-a-year multi-agency organization employing almost 300 analysts, the majority of whom are corporate contractors.

The NSAC is a part of the Foreign Terrorist Tracking Task Force (FTTTF), which according to the FBI, was created after the September 11 attacks to "provide information that helps keep foreign terrorists and their supporters out of the U.S. or leads to their removal, detention, prosecution or other legal action". Budget documents say that the NSAC is a data mining operation that tries to help the FTTTF predict whether someone is a terrorist or might have ties to terrorists.
