= Palm Beach, New Zealand =

Palm Beach
- Suburb
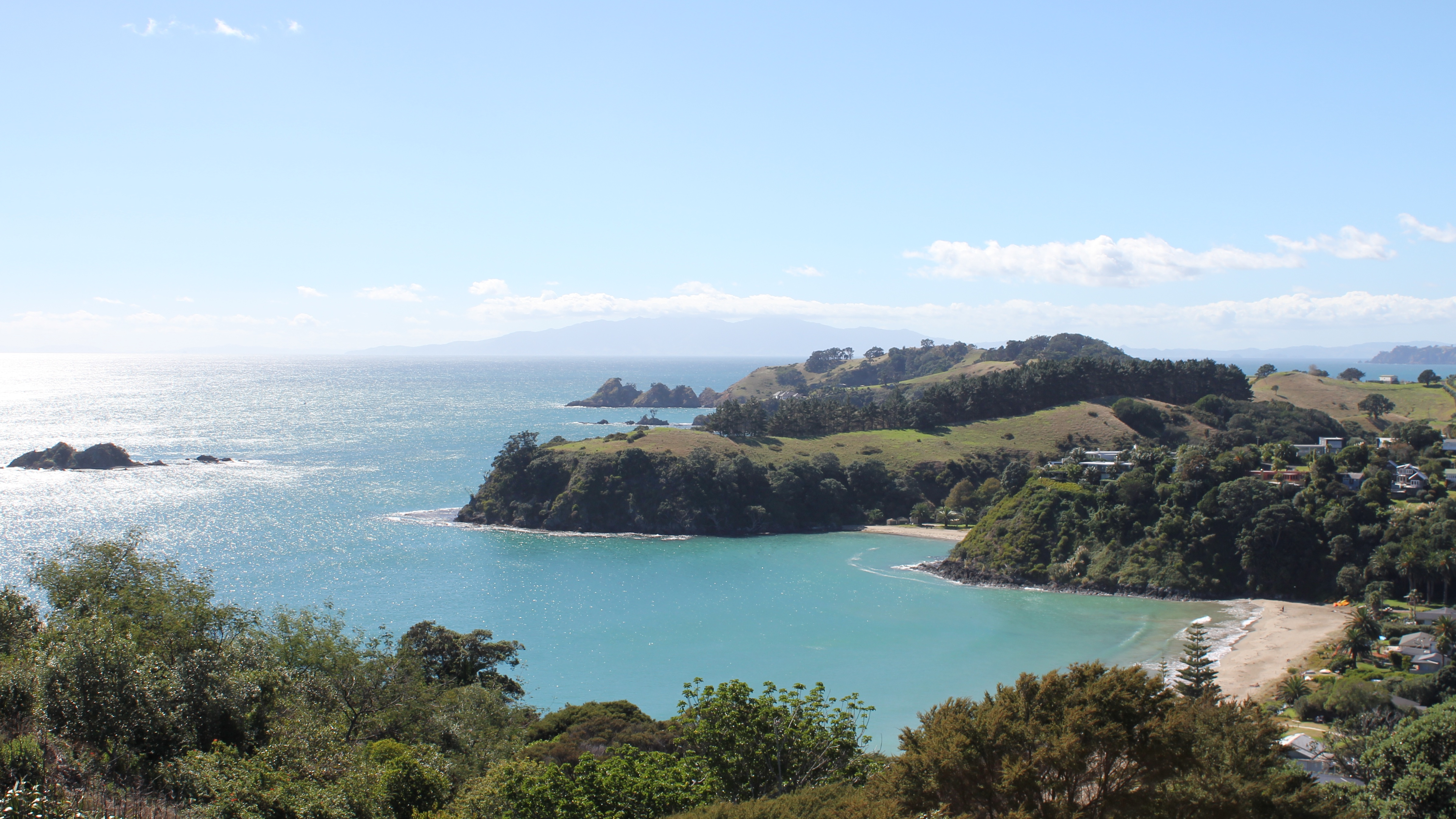
- Interactive map of Palm Beach
- Coordinates: 36.781°S 175.044°E
- Country: New Zealand
- City: Auckland
- Local authority: Auckland Council
- Electoral ward: Waitematā and Gulf ward
- Local board: Waiheke Local Board

Area
  - Land: 367 ha (910 acres)

Population (June 2025)
  - Total: 1,240
  - Density: 338/km^{2} (875/sq mi)

	(Hauraki Gulf)
Oneroa	Palm Beach	Onetangi
Surfdale		Ostend

Palm Beach is a settlement on Waiheke Island in northern New Zealand. The eponymous beach is named for phoenix palms at the eastern end, and has safe swimming and white sand.

== Demographics ==
The statistical area of Oneroa East-Palm Beach, which includes several bays on the north coast of Waiheke, covers 3.67 km^{2} (1.42 sq mi) and had an estimated population of 1,240 as of June 2025, with a population density of 338 people per km^{2}.

Historical population
Year	Pop.	±% p.a.
2006	1,137	—
2013	1,179	+0.52%
2018	1,254	+1.24%
2023	1,242	−0.19%

Oneroa East-Palm Beach had a population of 1,242 in the 2023 New Zealand census, a decrease of 12 people (−1.0%) since the 2018 census, and an increase of 63 people (5.3%) since the 2013 census. There were 624 males, 612 females and 9 people of other genders in 543 dwellings. 6.8% of people identified as LGBTIQ+. The median age was 51.2 years (compared with 38.1 years nationally). There were 147 people (11.8%) aged under 15 years, 138 (11.1%) aged 15 to 29, 606 (48.8%) aged 30 to 64, and 357 (28.7%) aged 65 or older.

People could identify as more than one ethnicity. The results were 91.1% European (Pākehā); 10.1% Māori; 2.4% Pasifika; 3.1% Asian; 4.3% Middle Eastern, Latin American and African New Zealanders (MELAA); and 1.7% other, which includes people giving their ethnicity as "New Zealander". English was spoken by 98.6%, Māori language by 2.7%, Samoan by 0.7%, and other languages by 15.7%. No language could be spoken by 1.0% (e.g. too young to talk). The percentage of people born overseas was 32.6, compared with 28.8% nationally.

Religious affiliations were 22.9% Christian, 0.2% Hindu, 0.7% Māori religious beliefs, 0.7% Buddhist, 1.0% New Age, 1.0% Jewish, and 1.4% other religions. People who answered that they had no religion were 65.9%, and 6.0% of people did not answer the census question.

Of those at least 15 years old, 414 (37.8%) people had a bachelor's or higher degree, 477 (43.6%) had a post-high school certificate or diploma, and 204 (18.6%) people exclusively held high school qualifications. The median income was $41,100, compared with $41,500 nationally. 213 people (19.5%) earned over $100,000 compared to 12.1% nationally. The employment status of those at least 15 was that 480 (43.8%) people were employed full-time, 213 (19.5%) were part-time, and 18 (1.6%) were unemployed.

== Gallery ==
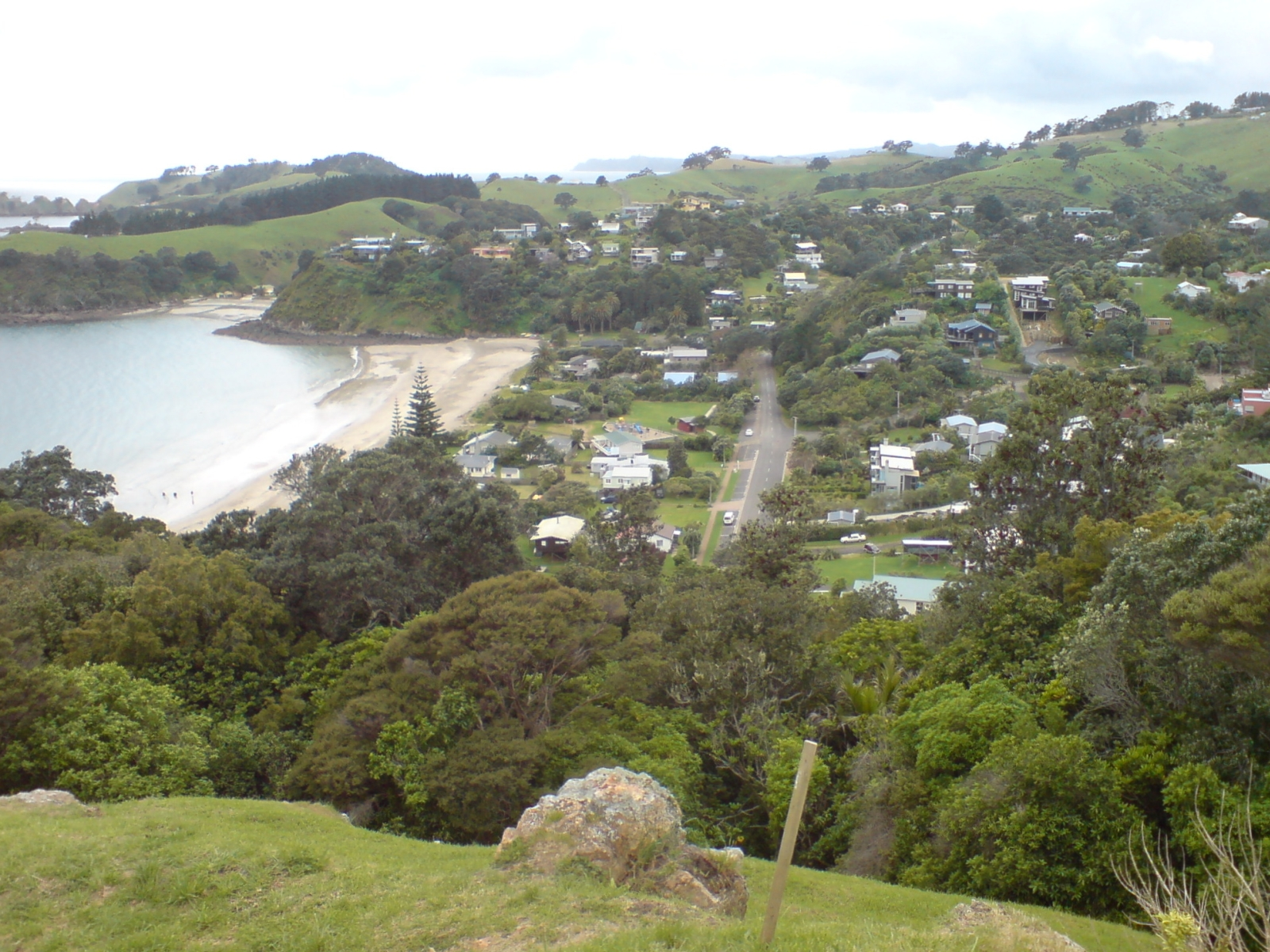
Palm Beach Village

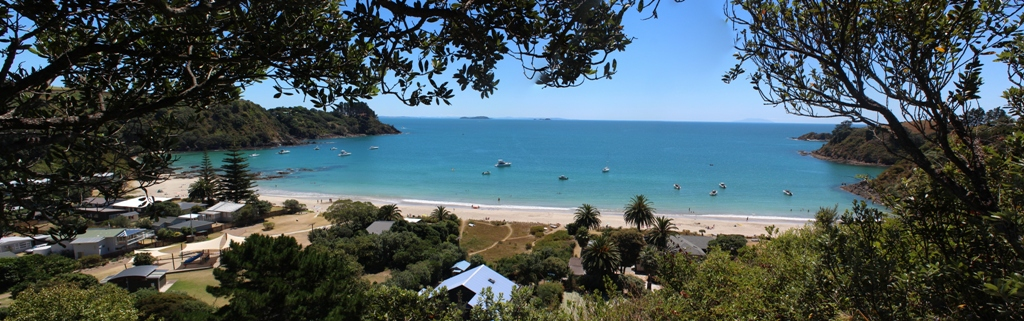
Palm beach
