= Mountain Air (New Zealand) =

Scenic flight company, 1988–2021

IATA	ICAO	Call sign
—	-	-
- Founded: 1988
- Ceased operations: March 28, 2021
- Hubs: Chateau Airfield, Mount Ruapehu
- Fleet size: 2
- Parent company: Mountain Air Limited
- Headquarters: Tongariro National Park, New Zealand
- Key people: Bhrent Guy (Chief Pilot/CEO)
- Website: www.mountainair.co.nz

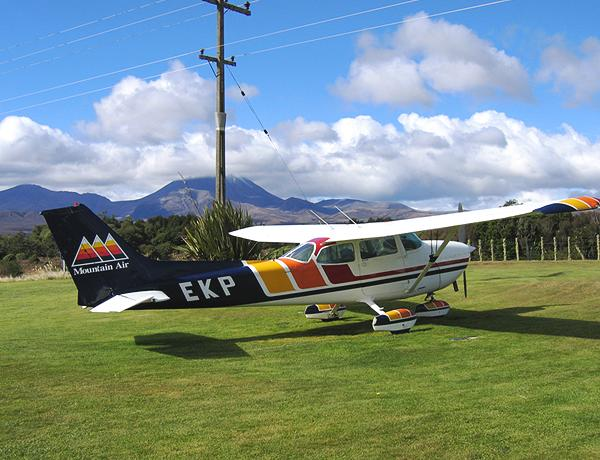
Mountain Air Cessna 172

Mountain Air was a scenic flight operation founded in 1988 and was based at the Chateau Airfield on the edge of the Tongariro National Park Dual World Heritage area. The majority of Mountain Air's business were scenic flights, but the company also provided charter flight options, and was the sole provider of aerial tracking for Kiwi and Short-tailed bats in the Central North Island. On 28 March 2021, the airline ceased all operations.

Mountain Air was owned by Bhrent and Kathy Guy. A former part of the company was operating independently as Fly My Sky in the Auckland Region until the end of June 2021, when it too ceased all operations.

== History ==
Mountain Air was founded in 1988 by Keith and Robyn McKenzie and used a Cessna 172 and 206 to conduct scenic flights over the Tongariro National Park. The company established an airstrip on a high country sheep station airfield at the base of the active volcano, Mount Ruapehu. Recently passengers have had the added attraction of viewing sites in the Park where filming for The Lord of the Rings film trilogy took place.

In 2005 then Prime Minister Helen Clark was flying aboard a Piper Aztec when the door came loose mid-flight. The plane landed safely.

Two Britten Norman Islanders and two Piper Aztec aircraft were added to the fleet and services extended to provide New Zealand wide charter. Schedule services were developed to provide several flights a day between Auckland International Airport, Whangarei and Great Barrier Island in the Hauraki Gulf in 1998. Two more Britten-Norman Islander aircraft were added to the fleet in 2006 & 2007.

The Chateau division was sold to Bhrent and Kathy Guy in 2007 and retained the name ‘Mountain Air’ operating the Cessna 172 and Cessna 206. The Auckland base was renamed 'Fly My Sky' and was operated as a separate company by Keith and Robyn McKenzie.

Flight operations at Mountain Air included:

- Volcanic scenic flights around Tongariro National Park and the central north island
- Aerial tracking for kiwi, short-tailed bats and deer
- Photography Charter
- Air transfers for hunting trips
- General air transfers between aerodromes throughout New Zealand

On March 28 2021, the airline shut down and ceased all operations.

== Fleet ==
The fleet consisted of one Cessna 172 and one Cessna 206.

== See also ==
- Air transport in New Zealand
- List of airlines of New Zealand
- List of general aviation operators of New Zealand
