= Claris, New Zealand =

Locality in Auckland Region, New Zealand

Coordinates: 36.244924°S 175.4658134°E

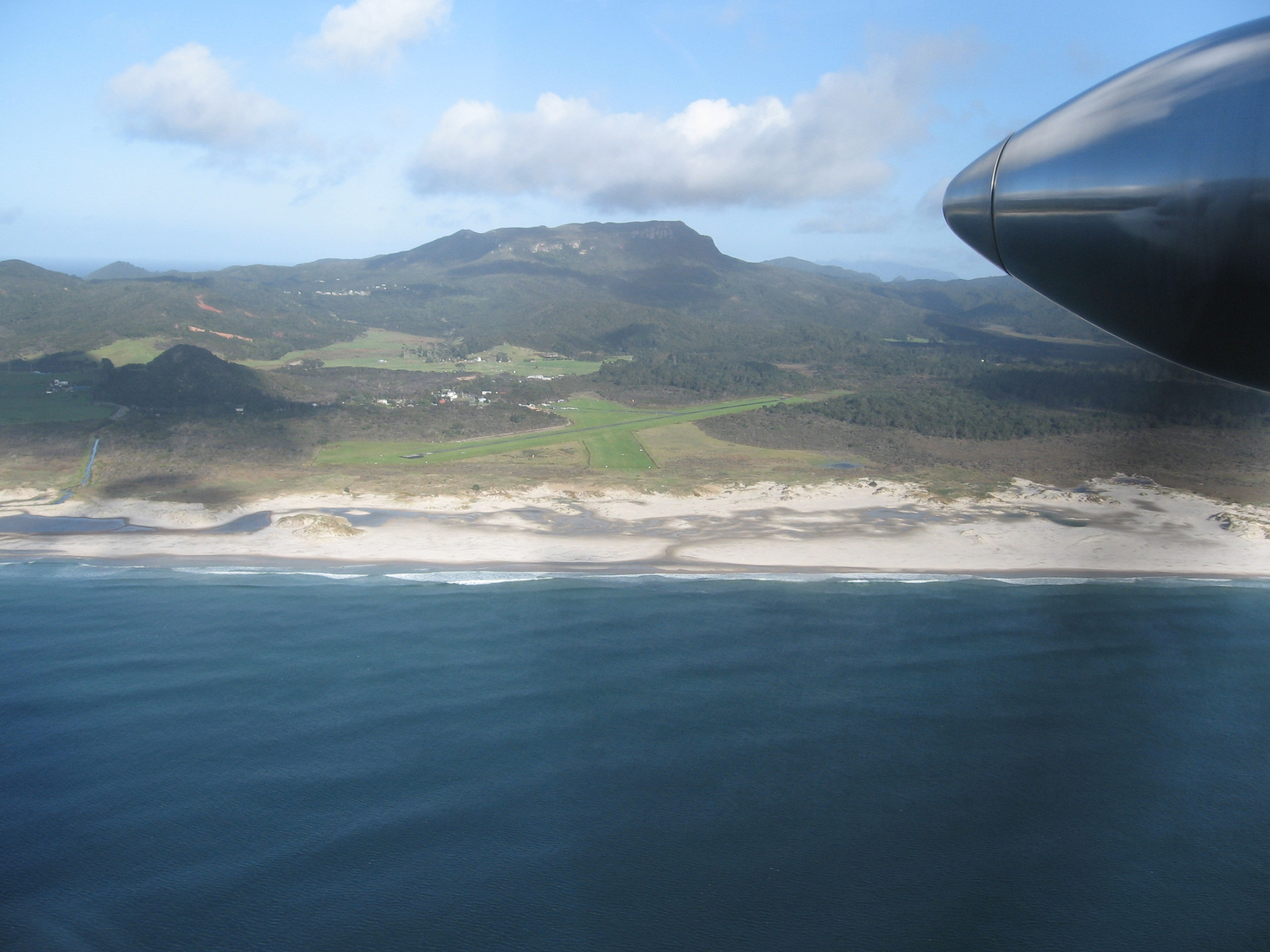
View of Claris and the Great Barrier Aerodrome

Claris is a settlement on the east coast of Great Barrier Island in the Auckland Region of New Zealand. Though less populous than the main seaport area of Tryphena on the west coast, Claris functions as the administrative centre for the island, and a large proportion of its commercial and community services are based there.

Auckland Council's service centre for the island is in the township, with services including fire permits and property information services and the island's public library. The Aotea / Great Barrier Island Local Board has offices next door. The island's police station is in Claris.

Great Barrier Aerodrome, the island's main airfield, is at Claris. The settlement also has a general store, a petrol station, a New Zealand Post shop, a liquor store, a pharmacy, and several outlets serving prepared food and, in some cases, liquor. It also has the island's only medical centre, and the only operating landfill.

Claris is located on a relatively flat area of land, surrounded by rolling hills. Kaitoke Beach and Medlands Beach are located nearby.

== History ==
In January 2013, a vegetation fire burned over 100 hectares near Claris and Kaitoke Beach. A planned flight departure at the aerodrome was moved to Okiwi Airfield, east of Ōkiwi.

Between 2015 and 2019, the Aotea / Great Barrier Island Local Board investigated establishing a cemetery at Okiwi or Claris, opting to establish it in Claris.

In July 2019, restrictions were put on the disposal of rubbish, due to capacity constraints at the Claris Landfill and Recycling Centre. Auckland Council has consent to continue dumping rubbish at the site until 2027, but is concerned it could run out of capacity before then. Visitors are encouraged to dispose of all rubbish.
