= Fly My Sky =

Airline based in Auckland, New Zealand

IATA	ICAO	Call sign
—	—	ILD (Island)
- Founded: 1998 (as Great Barrier Xpress); 2007 (as Fly My Sky)
- Ceased operations: 2021
- Hubs: Auckland Airport; Great Barrier Aerodrome
- Fleet size: 4
- Destinations: 3
- Parent company: Commercial Helicopters Ltd.
- Headquarters: Auckland, New Zealand
- Website: http://www.flymysky.co.nz

Fly My Sky was a small airline based in Auckland, New Zealand. It operated between Auckland, Matamata and Great Barrier Island. The airline went into liquidation at the end of June 2021. The airline evolved out of the now also defunct Mountain Air.

== History ==
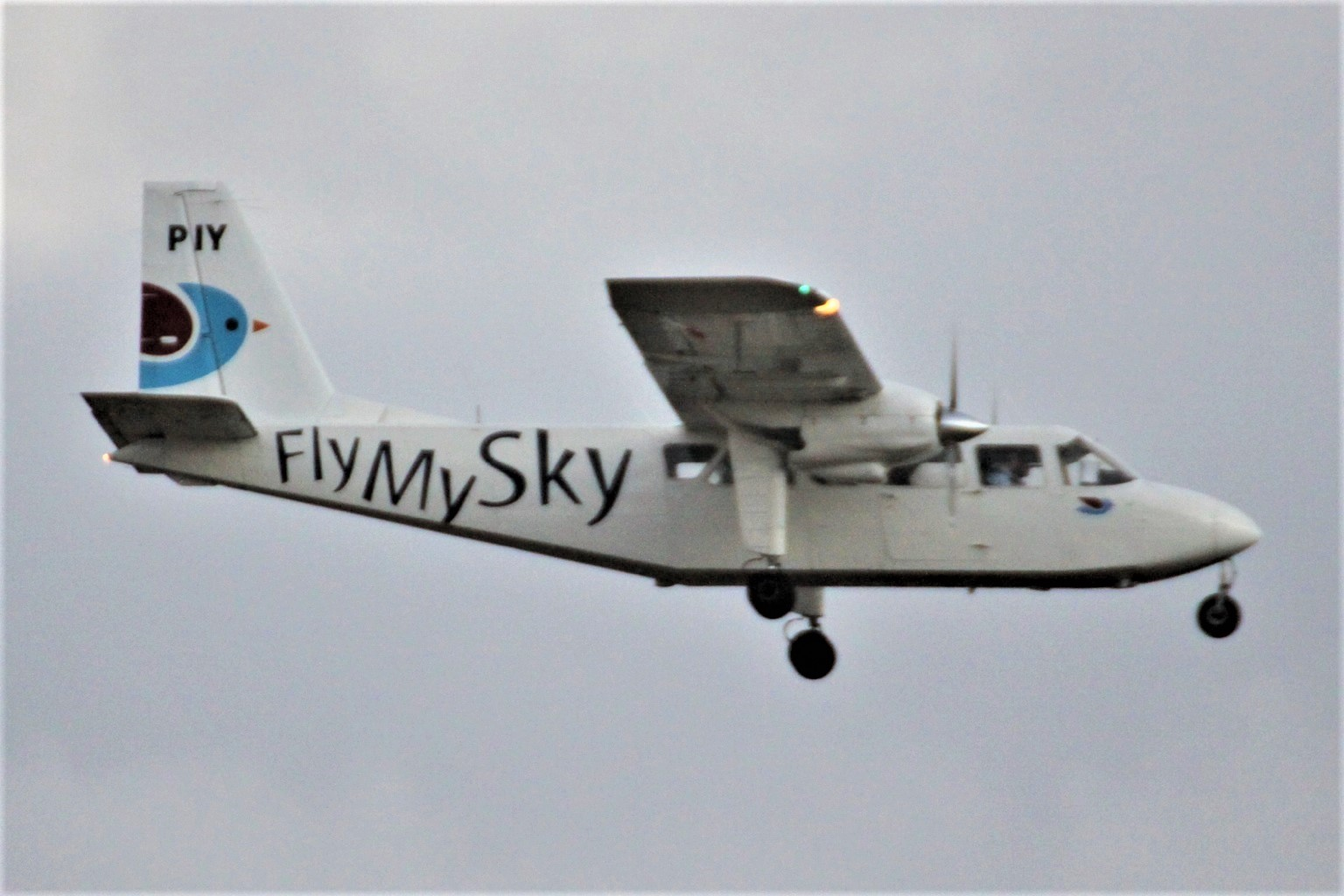
Islander ZK-PIY flying in 2012

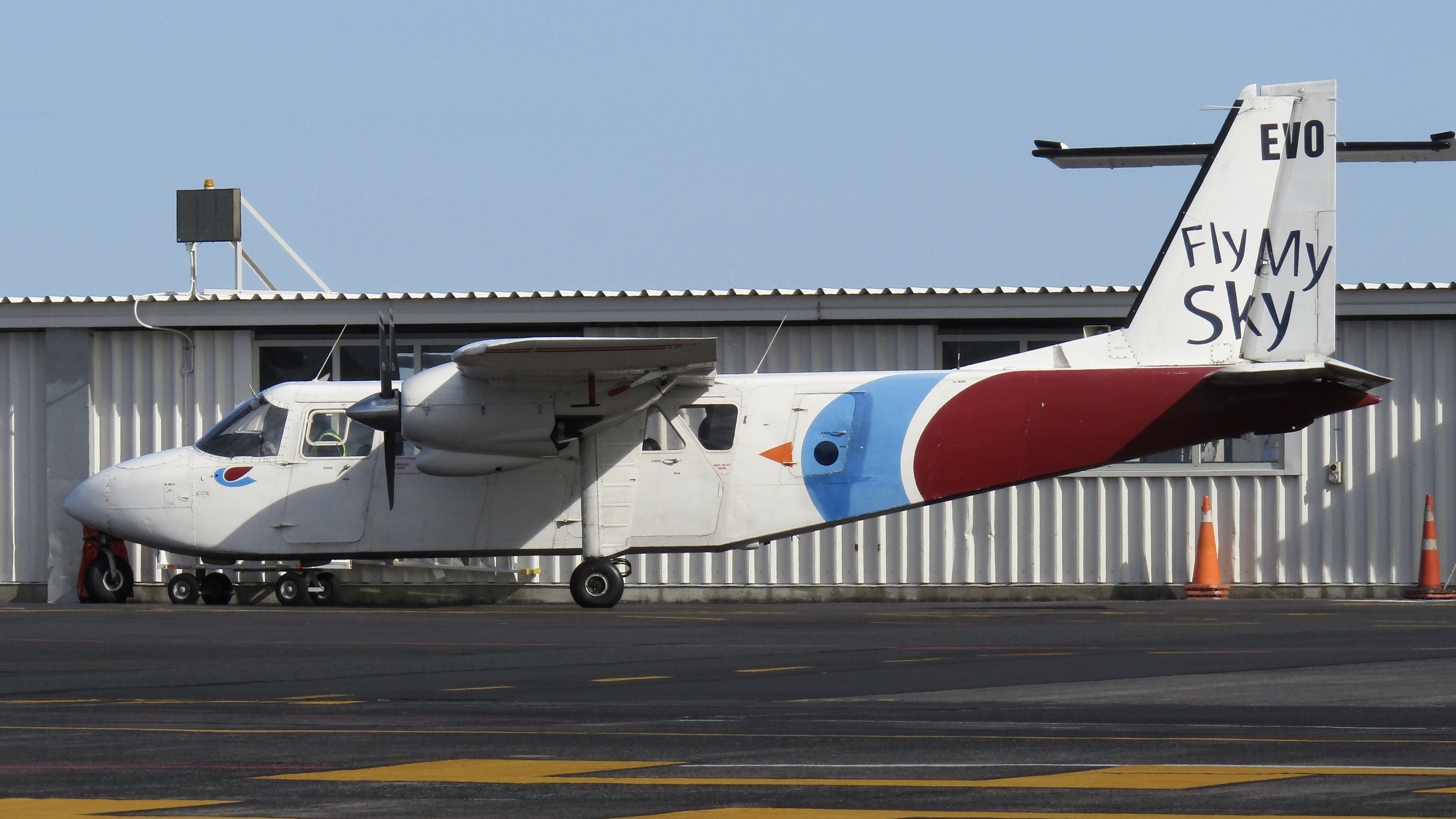
Islander ZK-EVO in a unique scheme. This aircraft replaced one damaged in a landing incident at Okiwi.

In 1998, Mountain Air added two Britten-Norman Islanders and two Piper Aztec aircraft to its fleet and extended its services to provide New Zealand-wide charter flights. Scheduled services were also developed to provide several flights a day between Auckland Airport, Whangarei and Great Barrier Island in the Hauraki Gulf branded as Great Barrier Xpress. The Whangarei service was withdrawn in 2008. In 2019, flights to and from Matamata were initiated.

The airline served both Great Barrier airports, Claris and Okiwi. Special window kits were put into the two Islander aircraft to provide more windows so passengers could have better views. Two more Britten-Norman Islander aircraft were added to the fleet in 2006 and 2007.

In June 2008, Mountain Air rebranded Great Barrier Xpress as Fly My Sky.

Fly My Sky attempted to restart Whangarei operations in October 2018, however the service failed due to lack of patronage and frequent cancellations and ceased in June 2019. In November of the same year, the airline started daily flights to Matamata for tours of the Hobbiton movie set.

On 20 March 2020, the company operating Fly My Sky, Commercial Helicopters Limited, was sold.

During the COVID-19 pandemic and subsequent lockdown, Fly My Sky was operating an extended daily schedule into Okiwi Airfield as an essential service. Normally the airfield is only operated to subject of demand.

In late June 2021, the airline went into liquidation and ceased all operations.

== Fleet ==
- 4 Britten-Norman BN-2B-26 Islander

== Operations ==
Fly My Sky previously operated out of Auckland Airport and flew scheduled daily flights to the following destinations:

- Great Barrier Aerodrome (Claris)
- Okiwi Airfield

As of 2020, Fly My Sky was the only operator to Okiwi Airfield.

Fly My Sky also supported parachute training for the Royal New Zealand Air Force (RNZAF) at RNZAF Base Whenuapai.

== Accident ==
- In January 2013 a Britten-Norman Islander aircraft was written off after a rough landing at Okiwi airport. The airline's CEO said the incident was caused by wind shear.

== See also ==
- List of defunct airlines of New Zealand
- History of aviation in New Zealand
