= Flag of Auckland City =

- Flag of Auckland
- Use: Civil flag
- Proportion: 9:6
- Adopted: 1980
- Relinquished: 2010 (Note: Auckland Council, which superseded Auckland City Council, does not use a flag.)
- Design: cornucopia in the top left canton = Auckland's wealth, a pick and shovel in the top right canton = the areas mining past, a horizontal stripe underneath with a sailing ship.
- Designed by: College of Arms

From the early 1950's until 2010, the local authority for the city of Auckland used its banner of arms as its flag. The current Auckland Council does not use this flag.

== History ==
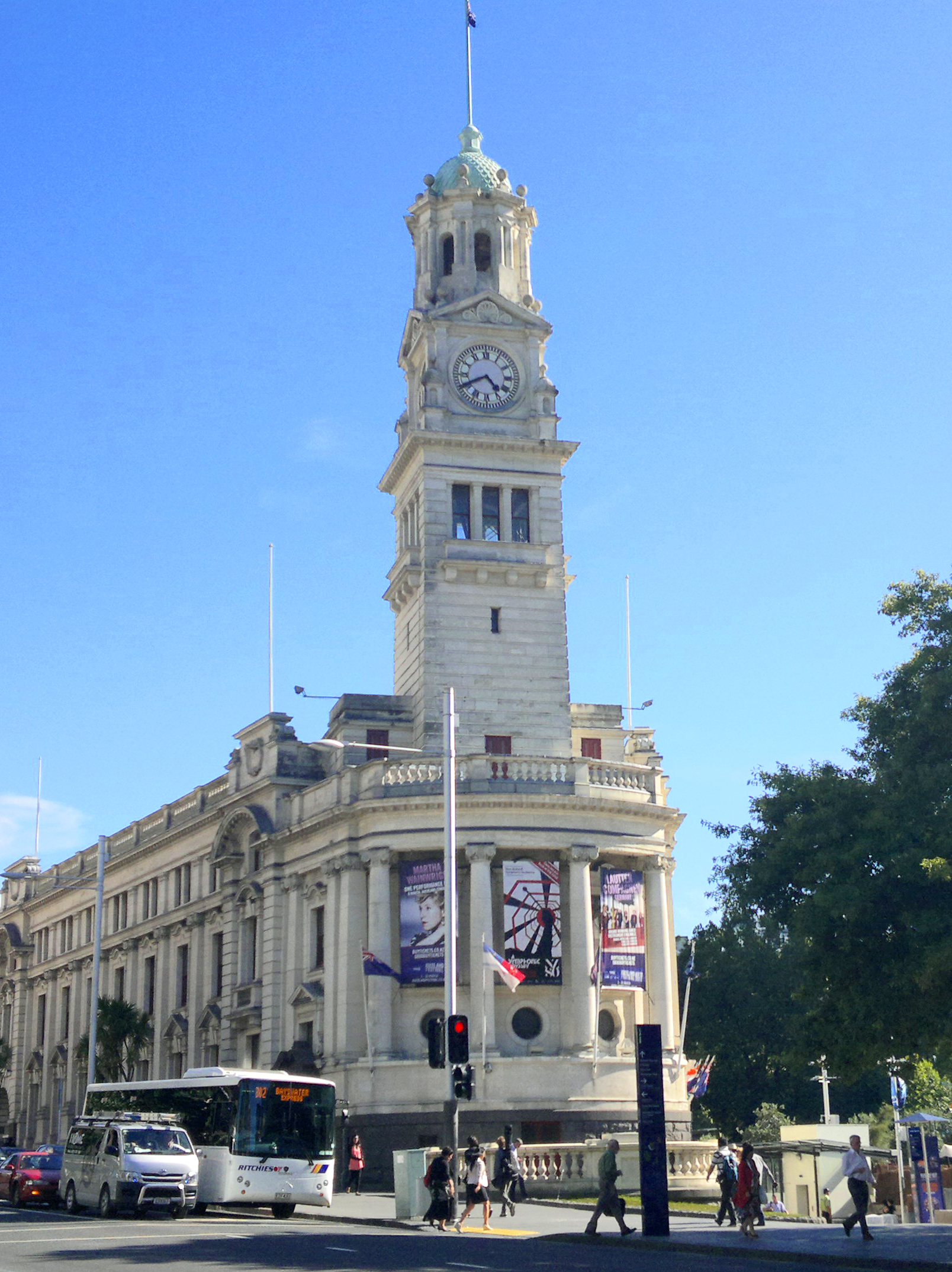
The flag of Auckland City hoisted on the Auckland Town Hall in 2011

When Auckland's town clerk, Tom Ashby was visiting London in the early 1950s, he discussed the question of a city flag with one of the four pursuivants of the College of Arms. After returning, he sent Charles St Clair, 17th Lord Sinclair, the Portcullis Pursuivant, a sketch of the proposed flag containing the complete coat of arms of the city council which was rejected. Sinclair replied in 1952 stating "A flag of this sort should not contain the complete Achievement; that is, it should not contain the Crest, Supporters and Motto. The Arms alone should be shown and should fill the complete flag." The flag was then adopted but used seldom, such as on the mayoral car for use in official functions. The Auckland City Council actually did not possess a full flag until January 1980 when Councillor Trevor Rogers donated one to the city to coincide with its hosting of the New Zealand Summer Games. As early as 1955 difficulty had been experienced in getting a flag woven locally at the required three-yard size to make the heraldic symbols visible from the street.
