= Rakitu Island =

Island in New Zealand

Native name: Rakitū
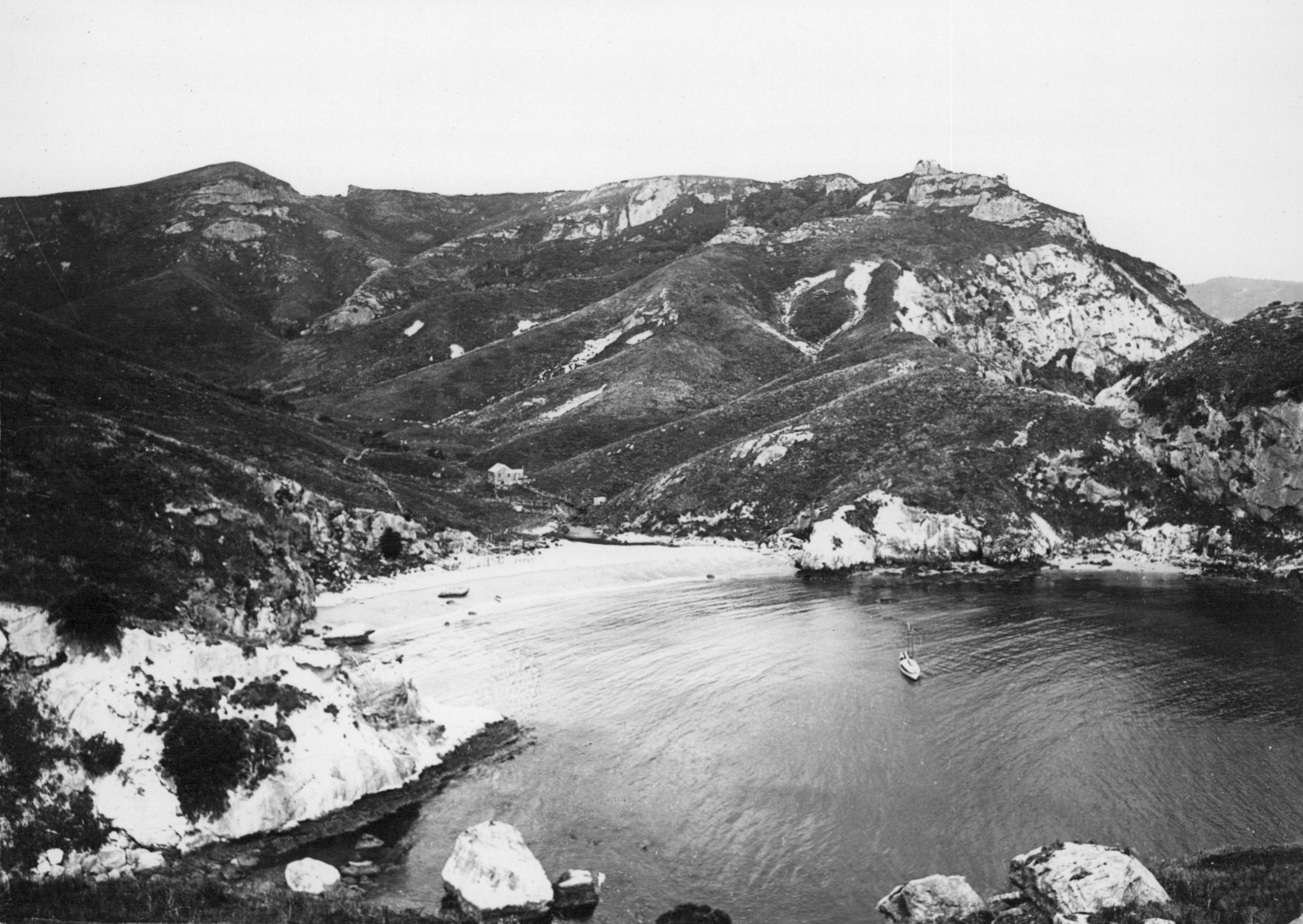
- Rakitu Island harbour in 1908
- Interactive map of Rakitu Island

Geography
- Coordinates: 36°07′30″S 175°30′0″E
- Area: 2.5 km^{2} (0.97 sq mi)
- Highest elevation: 220 m (720 ft)

Administration
- New Zealand

Demographics
- Population: 0
- Ethnic groups: Ngāti Rehua Ngātiwai ki Aotea

Rakitu Island, also known as Arid Island, is an uninhabited 253 ha (630 acres) island off the northeast coast of Great Barrier Island in the Auckland Region of New Zealand. The island lies about 4 km (2.5 mi) off Whangapoua Beach, sheltering the bay of Whangapoua Creek.

== Description ==
The island is located 2.5 kilometres from Great Barrier Island. The island's shores are predominantly steep cliffs, that rise up to 180 metres from sea level. The island's vegetation is a mix of retired farmland, coastal pōhutukawa, mānuka and kānuka. It is a refuge for many native bird species.

== Geology ==
The island is composed of the remains of two late Miocene rhyolite domes. The volcanoes are a part of the Whitianga Group, which erupted between 8 and 12 million years ago

== History ==
Rakitū Island is a part of the traditional rohe of Ngāti Rehua Ngātiwai ki Aotea, and was home to the namesake ancestor of the hapū, Rehua. The central valley was cleared for cultivations, and three pā sites and a number of kāinga were established on Rakitu.

During the early European era, whalers used the island as a base. Following this, it was predominantly used as a cattle grazing area by European settlers.

In 1994, the island became a scenic reserve, following its purchase by the Department of Conservation. In 2020, the island was declared predator free.

== See also ==
- List of islands of New Zealand
- List of islands
- Desert island
