= Surfdale =

- Suburb
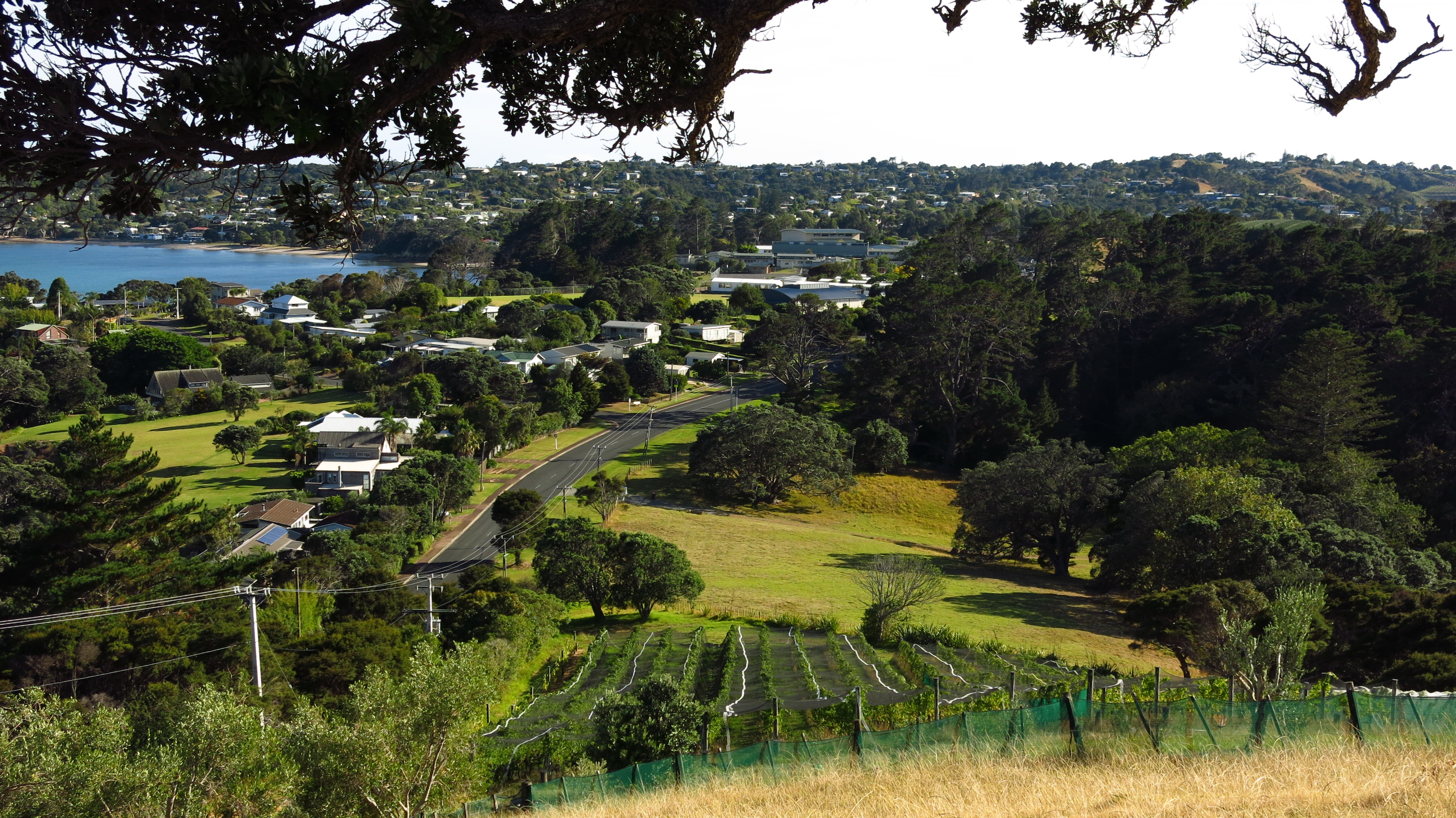
- Surfdale from Kennedy Point
- Interactive map of Surfdale
- Coordinates: 36.796°S 175.032°E
- Country: New Zealand
- City: Auckland
- Local authority: Auckland Council
- Electoral ward: Waitematā and Gulf ward
- Local board: Waiheke Local Board

Area
  - Land: 261 ha (640 acres)

Population (June 2025)
  - Total: 2,120
  - Density: 812/km^{2} (2,100/sq mi)
- Ferry terminals: Kennedy Point

| Oneroa | | Palm Beach |
| (Huruhi Bay) | Surfdale | Ostend |
| | (Waitematā Harbour) | (Pukiki Bay) |

Surfdale is a settlement on Waiheke Island in northern New Zealand. The original name being Okahu, Surfdale beach on Huruhi Bay has tidal mudflats, and is often used for windsurfing or kitesurfing. Shelly beach on Pukiki Bay is sandy and shelly. The area was developed in the mid–1920s.

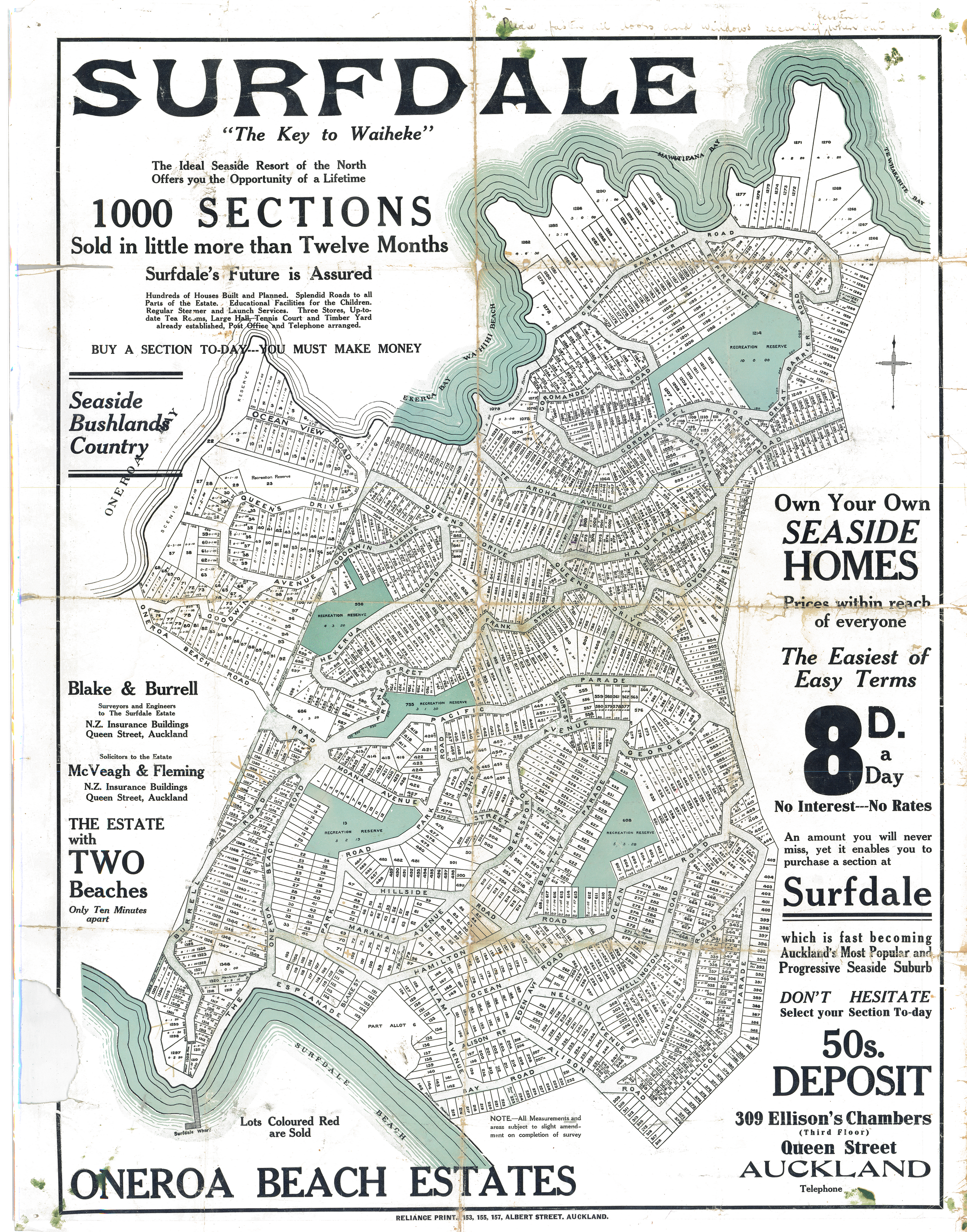
Map of the original Surfdale subdivision, 1921

== History ==
Until it was subdivided in 1921, the area had been known locally as Browns Bay, after its original European inhabitants. It was renamed as a result of a competition held by the land's subdividers. Apart from the privilege of naming the new suburb, the winner of the competition also received a free section. In 1922 a wharf was built, giving residents access to a regular ferry service to Auckland.

== Demographics ==
Surfdale covers 2.61 km^{2} (1.01 sq mi) and had an estimated population of 2,120 as of June 2025, with a population density of 812 people per km^{2}.

Historical population
| Year | Pop. | ±% p.a. |
|---|---|---|
| 2006 | 1,698 | — |
| 2013 | 1,881 | +1.47% |
| 2018 | 2,067 | +1.90% |
| 2023 | 2,058 | −0.09% |

Surfdale had a population of 2,058 in the 2023 New Zealand census, a decrease of 9 people (−0.4%) since the 2018 census, and an increase of 177 people (9.4%) since the 2013 census. There were 999 males, 1,053 females and 9 people of other genders in 795 dwellings. 5.7% of people identified as LGBTIQ+. The median age was 44.7 years (compared with 38.1 years nationally). There were 297 people (14.4%) aged under 15 years, 291 (14.1%) aged 15 to 29, 1,065 (51.7%) aged 30 to 64, and 405 (19.7%) aged 65 or older.

People could identify as more than one ethnicity. The results were 85.3% European (Pākehā); 13.8% Māori; 3.9% Pasifika; 7.0% Asian; 6.6% Middle Eastern, Latin American and African New Zealanders (MELAA); and 2.3% other, which includes people giving their ethnicity as "New Zealander". English was spoken by 97.1%, Māori language by 3.6%, Samoan by 0.6%, and other languages by 18.5%. No language could be spoken by 1.6% (e.g. too young to talk). New Zealand Sign Language was known by 0.4%. The percentage of people born overseas was 34.4, compared with 28.8% nationally.

Religious affiliations were 19.1% Christian, 1.2% Hindu, 0.9% Māori religious beliefs, 1.6% Buddhist, 0.7% New Age, 0.1% Jewish, and 2.3% other religions. People who answered that they had no religion were 66.5%, and 7.4% of people did not answer the census question.

Of those at least 15 years old, 531 (30.2%) people had a bachelor's or higher degree, 819 (46.5%) had a post-high school certificate or diploma, and 405 (23.0%) people exclusively held high school qualifications. The median income was $41,100, compared with $41,500 nationally. 243 people (13.8%) earned over $100,000 compared to 12.1% nationally. The employment status of those at least 15 was that 882 (50.1%) people were employed full-time, 300 (17.0%) were part-time, and 42 (2.4%) were unemployed.

== Education ==
Two of the three schools on Waiheke Island are on Donald Bruce Road in the Surfdale area.

Waiheke High School is a secondary school (Year 7–13) with a roll of 372 students. Te Huruhi Primary School is a contributing primary school (Year 1–6) with a roll of 259 students. Both schools are coeducational. Rolls are as of October 2025.
