= Awana Bay =

Bight in New Zealand

- Location in New Zealand
- Location: Great Barrier Island, Auckland Region, New Zealand
- Coordinates: 36°12′32″S 175°28′55″E
- Type: Bay

Awana Bay is a beach on the east coast of Great Barrier Island in the Hauraki Gulf of New Zealand's Auckland Region. The beach is used by both swimmers and surfers alike. It is deep-sloping, with a risk of both strong waves and rip currents. There are several peaks for intermediate to expert surfers, including a good left-hander at the northern end and a good left-hander at the southern end.

There is a Department of Conservation campsite at the bay at the northern end of the bay, about 300 metres from the beach. It can accommodate up to 120 people and is staffed for one month each year between Christmas Day and Auckland Anniversary Day.

The bay has a sand dune and estuary, and is an important breeding nesting ground for the endangered Brown Teal and Dotterel.

The area is only accessible on a narrow gravel road, and vehicle access directly on to the beach is not permitted. There are no rubbish bins, and dogs are banned.

The Awana Bay area mostly consists of farmland. It includes some sacred sites of Ngāti Rehua Ngati Wai ki Aotea.
