= Ōkiwi =

Settlement on Great Barrier Island, New Zealand

Coordinates: 36.1560°S 175.3930°E

Ōkiwi is a small settlement and rural community at the head of the Whangapoua Estuary, in Whangapoua Bay, on Great Barrier Island in New Zealand's Hauraki Gulf.

Facilities include Okiwi School, one of three schools on the island, all primary schools. Next to the school is Okiwi Park, with a public toilet, barbeque area, cycling trail and stream. The park has old tōtara and pūriri trees that were spared by farmers, alongside some new forest. The Church of Jesus Christ of Latter-day Saints has a church building. The Department of Conservation's base for Great Barrier Island was opened at Okiwi in 2016, replacing their office at Port Fitzroy, which was damaged by a cyclone on 10 June 2014 and cut off from the rest of the island for six weeks.

The Okiwi Basin area is a basin of farmland that can be seen from Palmer's Track, a walking track that runs from Windy Canyon to Mount Hobson. The fertile area is used for organic and small-scale growing, including the Okiwi Passion market garden and shop.

Okiwi Airfield, Whangapoua Beach and a camping ground are east of the settlement.

== History ==
Ngātiwai have traditionally lived in the area.

Between 2015 and 2019, the Aotea / Great Barrier Island Local Board investigated establishing a cemetery at Ōkiwi or Claris, opting to establish it in Claris.
