= Okiwi Airfield =

- IATA: none; ICAO: NZOX

Summary
- Airport type: Public
- Operator: Auckland Council
- Location: Ōkiwi, Great Barrier Island
- Elevation AMSL: 10 ft / 3 m
- Coordinates: 36°08′47″S 175°25′08″E

Map
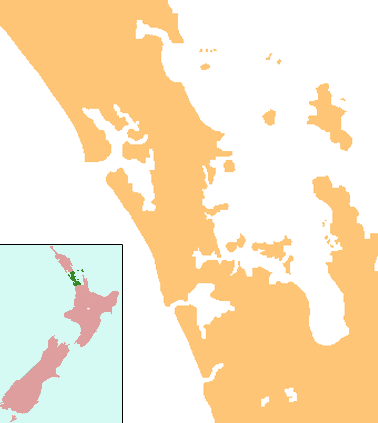
- Location of Okiwi Airfield

Runways
Direction	Length		Surface
Direction	ft	m	Surface
18/36	2,461	750	Bitumen

Okiwi Airfield (ICAO: NZOX), also called Okiwi Station Airfield, is a small airfield located near the village of Ōkiwi on Great Barrier Island, New Zealand. It has a single bitumen runway, and a small terminal in the form of a wooden hut. The airfield is owned by Auckland Council and is used for general aviation.

== History ==
Okiwi Airfield originally consisted of a grass airstrip that was prone to flooding during bad weather and regularly had to be closed through the winter for periods up to eight months.

The Auckland Aero Club was the first operator to the airfield, services commencing by at least 1971. Great Barrier Airlines (now Barrier Air) began services to Okiwi in August 1984 after the Auckland Aero Club ceased Great Barrier Island operations, citing difficulties in turning profit.

In November 2013, work commenced on sealing the runway in order to alleviate these issues and attract more commercial operators to the airfield. The new runway took 6 months and $1.5 million to build. It opened on 2 May 2014.

Barrier Air, which had earlier rebranded from Great Barrier Airlines, ceased services to Okiwi in 2016.

Fly My Sky was the last scheduled operator to the airfield, operating on demand. During the COVID-19 pandemic and subsequent lockdown in early 2020, the airline operated daily flights on the basis that it was an essential service.

== See also ==
- List of airports in New Zealand
- List of airlines of New Zealand
- Transport in New Zealand
