= Great Barrier Aerodrome =

Airport in New Zealand

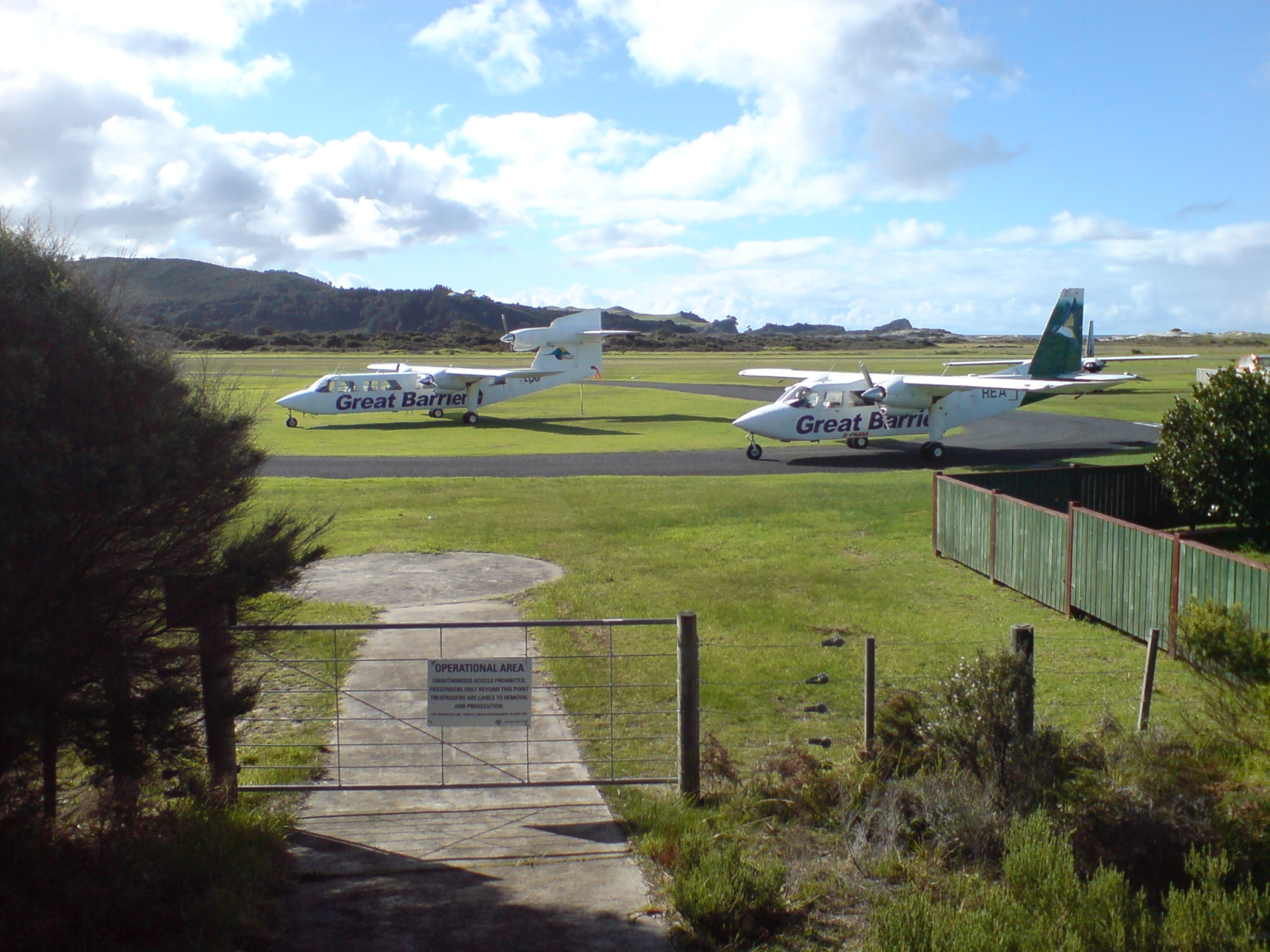
- Aircraft at the aerodrome
- IATA: GBZ; ICAO: NZGB

Summary
- Airport type: Public
- Operator: Auckland Council
- Location: Claris, Great Barrier Island
- Elevation AMSL: 21 ft (6.4 m)
- Coordinates: 36°14′29″S 175°28′19″E

Map
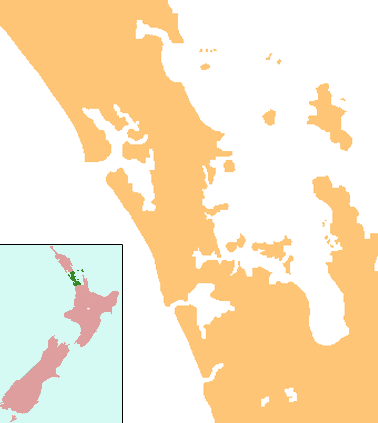
- Location of the Great Barrier Aerodrome

Runways
| Direction | Length | | Surface |
| Direction | ft | m | Surface |
|---|---|---|---|
| 06/24 | | 629 | Grass |
| 10/28 | | 921 | Bitumen/Grass |
- Source: NZ AIP

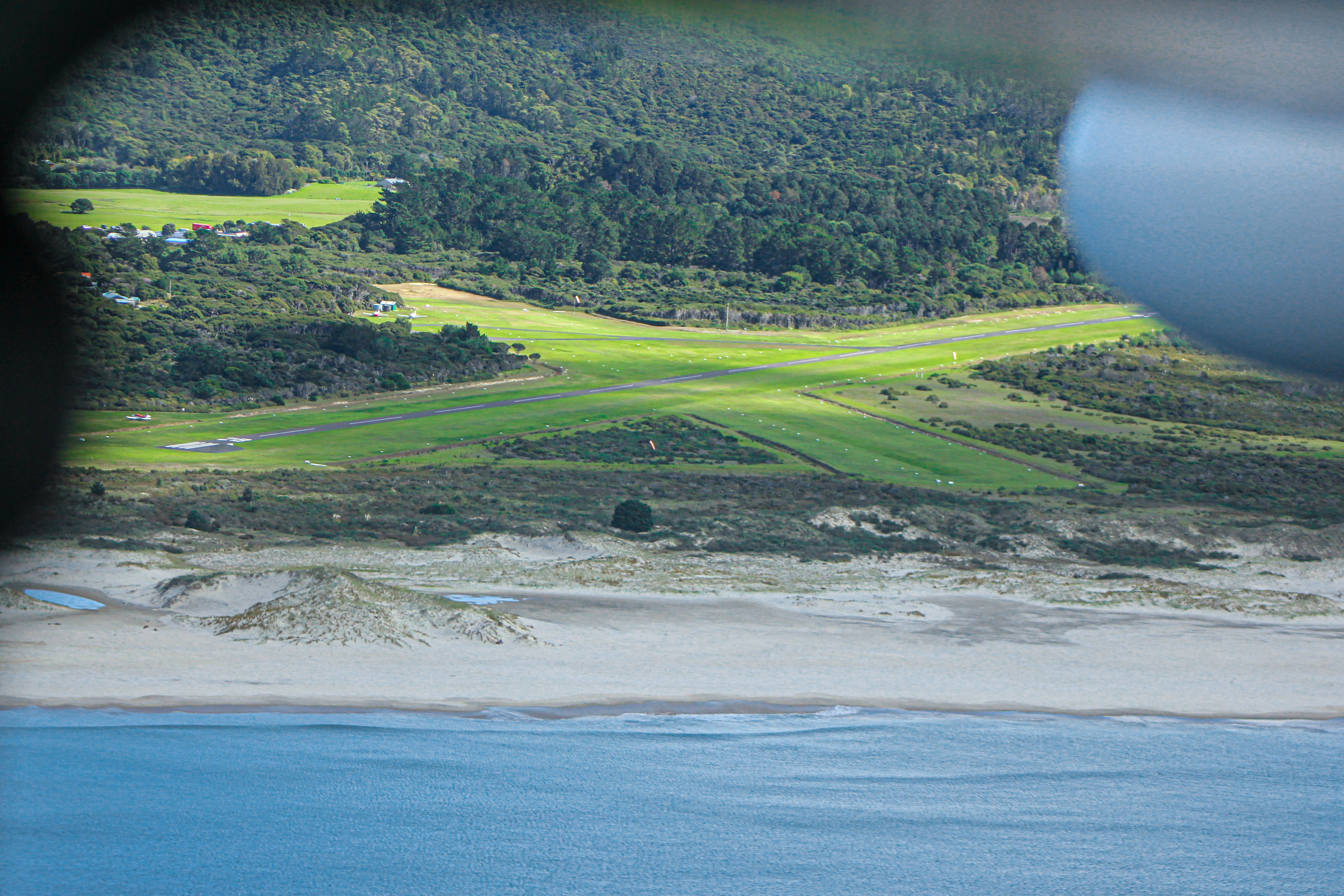
Great Barrier Airfield from the east

Great Barrier Aerodrome (IATA: GBZ, ICAO: NZGB), also known as Claris Airport, is the major airfield on Great Barrier Island. It is a small, non-towered aerodrome at Claris on Great Barrier Island in the Hauraki Gulf off the North Island of New Zealand. Fuel is not available.

The town of Claris is adjacent and there are rental car and bicycle hire services available at the airport. Feral pigs run loose on and in the vicinity of Great Barrier Aerodrome.

The aerodrome has two runways: a grass strip and a marked asphalt runway which is 921m long by 9m wide.

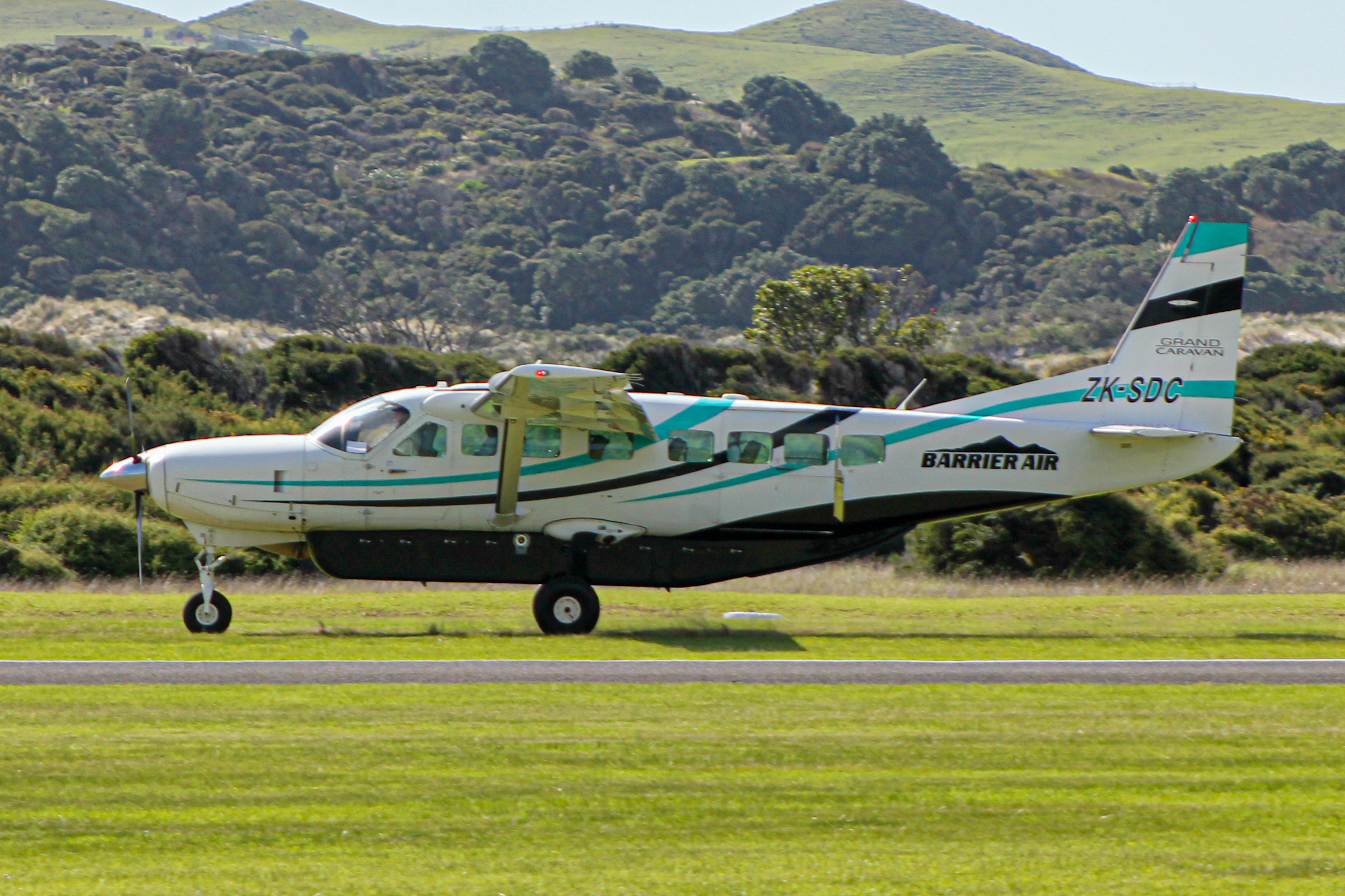
Barrier Air Cessna 208B Grand Caravan at the aerodrome.

== Airlines and destinations ==
Air Chathams connects Claris Airport to Auckland, Christchurch, Kapiti, Wellington, Whakatane, and Whanganui.

== See also ==
- List of airports in New Zealand
- List of airlines of New Zealand
- Transport in New Zealand
