= List of Auckland ferries =

This is a list of ferries that operate in Auckland, New Zealand, as part of the city's public transport network. Ferries are primarily operated by Fullers360, SeaLink, Belaire, and Explore. Auckland Transport also owns several ferries, but they have been leased back to Fullers360 until 2028.

== Auckland Transport ==
In 2022, Auckland Transport purchased four diesel ferries that were in dire need of repair from Fullers, and upgraded them to reduce their emissions. There are plans to commission five new hybrid-electric ferries, with the first two expected to arrive in 2025, plus two 100% electric ferries.

Name	Image	Shipyard	Launched	Capacity	Length	Class/type	Notes
Waitematā 1		(New Zealand) Q-West, Whanganui	2026; 0 years ago	300; 28 bikes	34.5m	IC19214	Hybrid-electric
Te Waiarohia		(New Zealand) McMullen & Wing, Auckland	2026; 0 years ago	191; 24 bikes	24m	EVM200	Electric
Te Komiti		(New Zealand) McMullen & Wing, Auckland	2025; 1 years ago	191; 24 bikes	24m	EVM200	Electric
Starflyte		Wavemaster, Perth, Australia	1999; 27 years ago	299; 15 bikes	32m		
Discovery V (D5)		South Pacific Shipbuilders, Brisbane, Australia	1998; 28 years ago	215; 12 bikes	24m		
Wanderer		RDM, Tasmania, Australia	1996; 30 years ago	196; 8 bikes	25m		
Tiri Kat		Sabre Catamaran, Perth, Australia	1993; 33 years ago	252; 20 bikes	22m		

== Explore Group ==
Name	Image	Shipyard	Launched	Capacity	Length	Class/type	Notes
Tuhi Rapa		(Australia) Aluminium Marine, Brisbane	2022; 4 year ago	300; 30 bikes	29m	IC22043	
Island Explorer		(Australia) Aluminium Marine, Brisbane	2018; 8 years ago	170; 40 bikes	21m	IC17050	Relocated from the Whitsunday Islands
Discovery IV (D4)		(New Zealand) Q-West, Whanganui	1998; 28 years ago	80	17.1m		Relocated from the Bay of Islands
Ngārapa		(New Zealand) Wooden Boat Workshop, Parnell	1996; 30 years ago	55	15		Relocated from the Bay of Islands. Previously called Discovery III. (Note: For a period of time, there were two ferries called Discovery III (D3), one owned by Explore and one owned by Fullers. Explore's vessel has since been renamed to Ngārapa.)

== Fullers360 ==
Key:	Out of service	Sold or Scrapped

Name	Image	Shipyard	Launched	Capacity	Length	Class/type	Notes
Waitematā 2		(New Zealand) Q-West, Whanganui	2025 planned	300; 28 bikes	32m	IC19214	Hybrid-electric
Kermadec		(New Zealand) Vessev, Auckland	2024; 2 years ago	8; 0 bikes	8.9m	VS-9	Electric. Touted as “the world's first electric hydrofoil ferry”. However, it will not be used for commuter ferry services
Kororā		(New Zealand) Q-West, Whanganui	2016; 10 years ago	420; 20 bikes	34.9m	IC15128	
Tōrea		(New Zealand) Q-West, Whanganui	2017; 9 years ago	420; 20 bikes	34.9m	IC15128	
Te Maki		(New Zealand) Challenge Marine, Nelson	2017; 9 years ago	174; 10 bikes	23.9m	IC15062	
Discovery VII (D7)		(Australia) Aluminium Marine, Brisbane	2015; 11 years ago	134; 6 bikes	19m	IC14202	
Discovery VI (D6)		(Australia) Aluminium Marine, Brisbane	2015; 11 years ago	249; 6 bikes	24.96m	ICO13078	
Te Kōtuku		(New Zealand) Q-West, Whanganui	2014; 12 years ago	329; 20 bikes	34m		
Ika Kākahi		(Australia) Aluminium Boats, Brisbane	2011; 15 years ago	400; 20 bikes	37m	EnviroCat	Built as a crew-transfer vessel for Gladstone LNG, known as Capricornian Dancer before joining Fullers in 2019
Kekeno		(Australia) Aluminium Boats, Brisbane	2011; 15 years ago	400; 20 bikes	37m	EnviroCat	Built as a crew-transfer vessel for Gladstone LNG, known as Capricornian Surfer before joining Fullers in 2017
Takahē		(Australia) Aluminium Marine, Brisbane	2011; 15 years ago	194; 10 bikes	23.9m	IC11022	
Adventurer		(Australia) RDM, Tasmania	1996; 30 years ago	246; 12 bikes	29m		
Discovery III (D3)		(New Zealand) Robertson Boats, Warkworth	1996; 30 years ago	150; 6 bikes	18m		
Tiger Cat		(New Zealand)	1996; 30 years ago	140; 15 bikes	18m		
Harbour Cat		(New Zealand)	1995; 31 years ago	108; 15 bikes	20m		
Discovery II (D2)		(New Zealand) Robertson Boats, Warkworth	1995; 31 years ago	78; 4 bikes	15m		Withdrawn from service mid 2025 and sold to unknown late 2025-early 2026
Osprey		(New Zealand) homebuilt in Whangārei	1994; 32 years ago	152; 10 bikes	19.5m		Withdrawn from service in 2023. Not wheelchair accessible.
Discovery I (D1)		(New Zealand) Robertson Boats, Warkworth	1993; 33 years ago	151	20m		
Superflyte		(Australia) Wavemaster, Perth	1996; 30 years ago	650; 30 bikes	41m		Withdrawn from service in 2019, scrapped in 2023
Seaflyte		(Australia) Wavemaster, Perth	1994; 32 years ago	208; 20 bikes	21.48m		Renamed Milford Explorer, now operates in Milford Sound
Jet Raider		(Australia) Wavemaster, Perth	1990; 36 years ago	400	37m		Sold to Tonga in 2017 and renamed to MV Māui Was put up for sale again in 2024 and is awaiting buyer.
Kea		(New Zealand) WECO, Whangārei	1988; 38 years ago	450; 30 bikes	27.06m		Withdrawn from service in 2020, scrapped in 2023
Quickcat		(Australia) SBF Engineering, Perth	1986; 40 years ago	650; 30 bikes	33.38m		Auckland's first purpose built ferry for the Auckland to Waiheke Island service. Withdrawn from service in May/June 2025, Scrapped in October/November 2026

== Belaire Ferries ==
Belaire Ferries operates 16 daily services from Downtown Auckland to West Harbour, and 4 services to Rakino Island each week.

Name	Image	Shipyard	Launched	Capacity	Length	Notes
Centurion		(Australia) Aluminium Marine, Brisbane	2000; 26 years old	150	20.8m	Ex. Gold Coast Ferries
Spirit		(Australia) Aluminium Marine, Brisbane	1997; 29 years old	88	16.8m	Ex. Gold Coast Ferries
Serenity		(New Zealand) Bob Huntington Builders, NZ	1998; 28 years old	55	14.2m	Ex. Salvation Army
Clipper I		(New Zealand) Q-West, Whanganui	2002; 24 years old	48	13.1m	Ex. SeaLink Pine Harbour
Splash Palace (sold in 2023)		(Australia) Calibre Boats, Adelaide	2004; 22 years old	24; 0 bikes	11.25m	
M.V. Belaire (sold in 2023)		(Australia) Calibre Boats, Adelaide	2005; 21 years old	24; 0 bikes	11.25m	

== SeaLink ==
Name	Image	Shipyard	Launched	Capacity	Tonnage	Length
Sea Quest		Guangzhou Huahang Shipbuilding, Guangzhou, China; Jianglong Shipbuilding, Zhuhai, China	2022; 4 years ago	30 cars 10 bikes 299 passengers	497 GT	44.8m
Seabridge		Heron Ship Repair, Whangārei, New Zealand	2013; 13 years ago	24 cars 10 bikes 250 passengers	482 GT	46.22m
Seacat		South Pacific Marine, Burpengary, Australia; Southern Hemisphere Shipyards, Brisbane, Australia	2004; 22 years ago	55 cars 10 bikes 400 passengers	573 GT	49.5m
Seaway II		Australia	1996; 30 years ago	24 cars 10 bikes 300 passengers	281 GT	37.85m
Island Navigator		Australia	1988; 38 years ago	53 cars 10 bikes 195 passengers	361 GT	37.95m
Seamaster (relocated to Fiji in 2023)		Whangārei, New Zealand	1986; 40 years ago	25 cars 10 bikes 300 passengers		41.38m
Pine Harbour Passenger Ferries
Clipper V		Q-West, Whanganui, New Zealand	2015; 11 years ago	98		17.7m
Clipper IV		Q-West, Whanganui, New Zealand	2011; 15 years ago	98		17.7m
Clipper III		Q-West, Whanganui, New Zealand	2008; 18 years ago	48		14.95m
Clipper II		Q-West, Whanganui, New Zealand	2006; 20 years ago	48		14.95m

== Island Direct ==
Island Direct operates 9 daily services from Downtown Auckland to Matiatia, Waiheke Island. The service commenced in November 2023.

Name	Image	Shipyard	Launched	Capacity	Length	Notes
Te Wai Ora		Seacat Ships, Pattaya, Thailand	2022; 4 years ago	150	22m	Relocated from Madang, Papua New Guinea. Previously called Kalibobo Express.
Te Waipiki		(New Zealand) Q-West, Whanganui	2019; 7 years ago	73	19m	Relocated from Whakaari / White Island. Previously called Te Puia Whakaari.

== See also ==
- Public transport in Auckland
- Transport in Auckland
