= Browse LNG =

Shelved Australian liquefied natural gas plant project

Coordinates: 17.4886°S 122.1413°E

The Browse LNG was a liquefied natural gas plant project proposed for construction at James Price Point, 52 kilometres (32 mi) north of Broome on the Dampier Peninsula, Western Australia. It was considered by a joint venture, including Woodside Petroleum, Shell, BP, Japan Australia LNG, and BHP Billiton, with Woodside as the operator. It would have processed natural gas extracted from the Browse Basin. Liquefied natural gas would then be shipped from a port facility also located in the Browse LNG Precinct. It was abandoned as an onshore project owing to lack of economic viability.

== Background ==
The Browse Basin is estimated to contain combined contingent volumes of 15.9 trillion cubic feet of dry gas and 436 million barrels of condensate. The reserves are contained in the Torosa, Brecknock, and Calliance fields.

== History ==
The proposed project included an LNG gas plant located at James Price Point, 52 kilometres (32 mi) north of Broome on the Dampier Peninsula, WA.

As of December 2012, the owners of the joint venture were:

- Woodside Petroleum (Operator)
- Shell
- BP
- Japan Australia LNG (MIMI Browse) (a joint venture of Mitsubishi and Mitsui)
- BHP Billiton

In December 2012, PetroChina agreed to buy BHP Billiton's 8.3% stake in the East Browse and 20% holding in the West Browse joint venture for US$1.63 billion. The transaction was subject to regulatory approval and an option for the other members of the joint venture to match the offer.

The onshore project was abandoned by the joint venture after Australia's rising costs made the project unviable.

== Concerns ==
=== Indigenous concerns ===
James Price Point is close to as several Aboriginal sacred sites.

The Kimberley Land Council, as the representatives of the local Jabirr Jabirr people at Goolarabooloo relating to the Native Title Act 1993, supported the onshore project by 60% of the votes, in exchange for over a billion dollars over 30 years. However, some traditional owners engaged in a legal challenge against this decision. In a press statement they say "…many local Indigenous people are disgusted by the apparent abandonment of the established process put in place by the previous State government. Concerns include the threats made earlier in the year by the Premier regarding compulsory acquisition of land and the pre-empting of the Joint State and Commonwealth environmental and cultural assessment process via announcements by Woodside and the Premier."

=== Environment ===
According to Australian Greens, construction of the port facilities, including the dredging and blasting of reefs and seabed, is expected to result in a 50 square kilometres (19 sq mi) "marine deadzone".

The involvement by the Australian Greens was criticised by Jabirr elder Rita Augustine, representing the Environmental and Cultural Heritage Team and Jabirrlabirr traditional owners, who wrote an open letter to Bob Brown in August 2012.

According to one scientist, construction was expected to irreparably damage a large number of fossils unique to the area, including the only example of dinosaur footprint extant in Western Australia, and reputed to be the largest in the world.

One 2010 report on the significance of the dinosaur footprints stated that they were not of museum quality, were often degraded by erosional processes, and that many "footprints" identified by the public are in fact the results of erosion of the Broome Sandstone and not the result of biological origin (i.e. they are not fossils or fossil remnants).

Once operating, the plant is expected to discharge some 30 million cubic metres (1.1 billion cubic feet) of waste water into the ocean each year. A coalition of 25 international conservation groups raised questions as to how it would impact the area's wildlife, the area providing important habitat for turtles, whales, and seabirds. Broome's coast is home to the world's largest humpback whale nursery, five species of turtle, dugong, coral reefs and snubfin dolphin. The Environmental Protection Authority of Western Australia (EPA) report on the Browse Liquified Gas Precinct noted that: birthing grounds for the humpback whales were between 60 km and 240 km North of James Price Point; when the whales pass by the James Price Point, 95% of them pass more than 8 km off the point; and that as long as the EPA conditions are met, the protection on whales and turtles at the population level were likely to be met. The Sea Shepherd Conservation Society disputed the EPA study findings, referring to a documentary by Fair Projects, produced in collaboration with the Sea Shepherd Conservation Society, which purportedly showed video footage of hundreds of whales in the James Price Point area within 8 km of the coast line.

On 16 July 2012, the EPA announced that it had recommended the project for "strict conditional approval" and that "the precinct would provide for multiple users to be co-located on a single site, avoiding a number of LNG processing sites to spread along the coast and in more sensitive parts of the Kimberley."

== See also ==
- Gladstone LNG
- North West Shelf Project
- Wheatstone LNG
