= Ronald Roe =

Aboriginal Australian writer

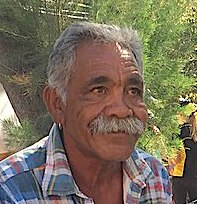
- Born: Australia
- Occupation: Writer

Ronald Roe is an Aboriginal Australian writer of Walman Yawuru descent, a Goolarabooloo elder living in Broome, Western Australia.

Roe is the Grandson of Paddy Roe and has written extensively on the role that Paddy has had in the protection of Country as Madja. Roe has published a paper titled 'Kunin Law: Crow and Country' in 2018 as a 'A Letter To All First Nations', addressing issues of customary law and contemporary challenges in the Kimberley region of Western Australia. Roe has also published on topics such as social justice and human rights including 'All Under One CCTV: A Letter To The Australian Privacy Commissioner'.

Ronald Roe has also produced a number of short films, including Native Title and as a contributor to Voices of the Goolarabooloo.

== Citations ==
Roe, Ronald (2019): All Under One CCTV: A Letter To The Australian Privacy Commissioner. figshare. Online resource.
