= James Price Point =

Point in Kimberley region of Western Australia

Coordinates: 17.4886°S 122.1413°E

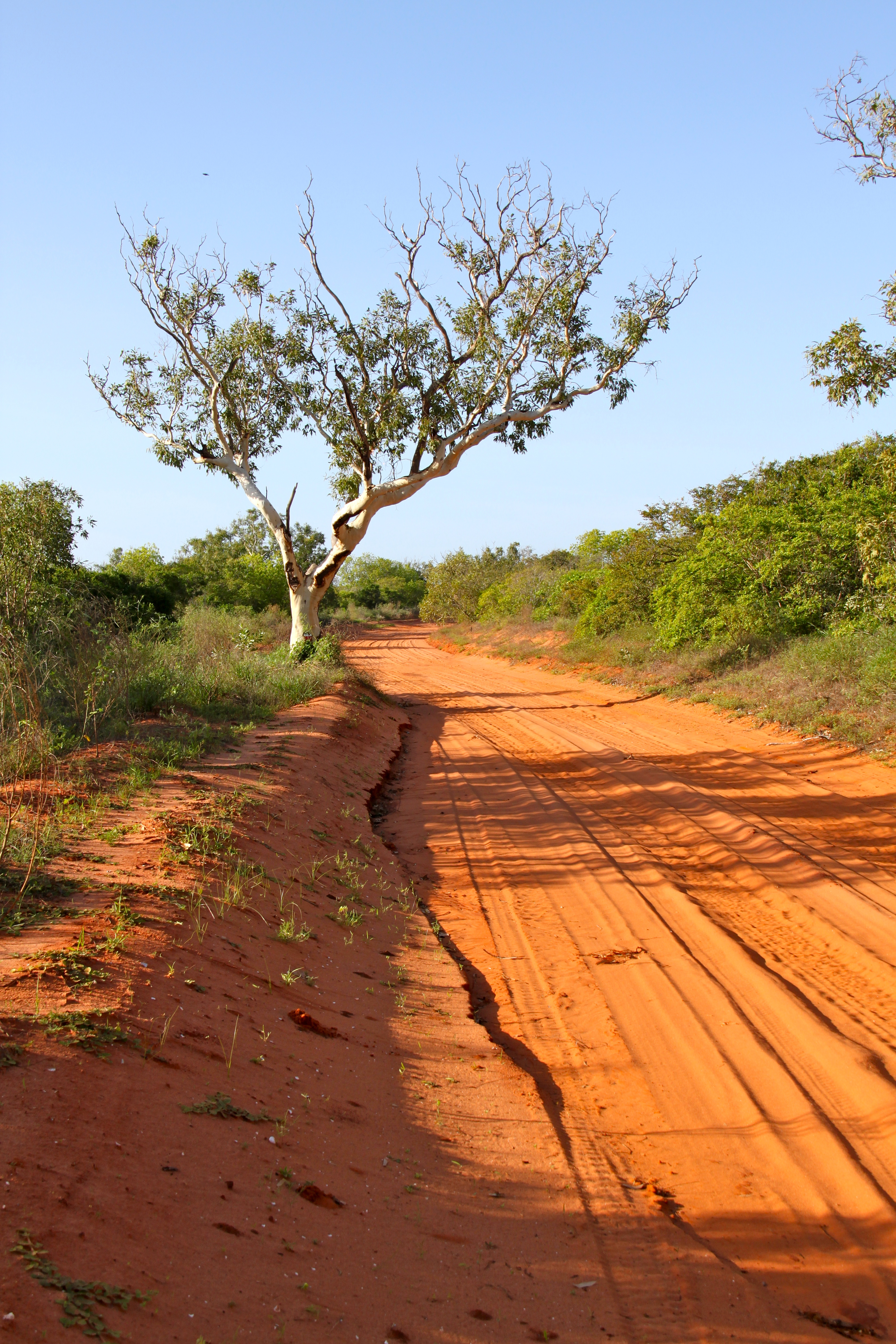
Pindan country near James Price Point

James Price Point (JPP), also known as Walmadany, is a headland in the Kimberley region of Western Australia. It is 52 kilometres (32 mi) north of Broome.

== History ==
The location of James Price Point is on the traditional lands of the Jabirr Jabirr / Ngumbarl people, whose name for it is Walmadany.

James Price Point (also known as JPP) was probably named after James Price, Minister for Works in Western Australia, who died in May 1910. In 1909 a tour of north-west ports in SS Koombana was undertaken including Price, and the premier Sir Newton Moore.

In the 1930s, Paddy Roe, a Nyigina man, moved to the area. He was a prominent author and activist in the 1980s, established the Lurujarri Heritage Trail, which teaches people about aboriginal culture. His descendants are the Goolarabooloo people/family (Goolarabooloo means "coastal people living in or near Yawuru land" in the Yawuru language).

In 1994, Roe's grandson, J Roe made a native title claim over the area. In response, the Jabirr Jabirr people stated that while they were happy to work cooperatively with the Goolarabooloo, they also wanted their rights recognised, and it became a joint claim.

== Dinosaur footprints ==
The Aboriginal people recognise the fossilised footprints on the coast as being the footprints of Marella, the Emu Man, a creator being from the Dreamtime.

A 2016 study of the footprints by the University of Queensland confirmed they are the largest collection of dinosaur footprints in the world and contain the world's largest single print. Indications of 21 separate dinosaur species from the Cretaceous period have been identified.

== Browse LNG project ==
James Price Point was the proposed location of the Browse LNG gas terminal. The controversial proposal by Woodside Petroleum and its joint venture partners Royal Dutch Shell, BP, Mitsubishi Corporation and PetroChina divided the Broome community.

It was supported by the WA government, and the local Jabirr Jabirr people, who despite reservations, negotiated a deal of a billion dollars over 30 years. In a 2013 interview a traditional owner noted that "human dysfunction [was] a greater threat to a culture than development" and the money would help their people.

It was opposed by the Goolarabooloo family and conservation groups Environs Kimberley, The Wilderness Society, Australian Conservation Foundation, WWF-Australia, Sea Shepherd and local organisations — Broome Community No Gas Campaign and Save the Kimberley. The Australian Greens also pushed for the protection of James Price Point. Support to protect the Kimberley coast was also provided by John Butler, Missy Higgins, Xavier Rudd, Jimmy Barnes, Rob Hirst, Paul Kelly, and The Pigram Brothers.

After five years of intense opposition, the Woodside joint venture abandoned the proposal.

On 19 August 2013, the Supreme Court of Western Australia overruled Western Australian Environment Minister and the Western Australian Environmental Protection Authority's decision to recommend approval of the Browse LNG project at James Price Point after a legal challenge by Goolarabooloo custodian Richard Hunter and the Wilderness Society.

== Native title ==
In 2018, the native title claim was finalised, and it was found that the Jabirr Jabirr people had sole claim over the area, as the patriarch of the Goolarabooloo had arrived in the 1930s, well after colonisation. This was seen as a "bombshell" decision, in part because the Goolarabooloo were presented by the Australian media as the "real" traditional owners of the land.
