= Kea (disambiguation) =

The kea is a parrot native to New Zealand.

Kea or KEA can also refer to:

== Businesses and organisations ==
- Kea Aerospace, a New Zealand-based aircraft developer
- Hellenic Air Force Aircraft Depot, acronym KEA (Greek: Κρατικό Εργοστάσιο Αεροπλάνων), the oldest Greek aircraft manufacturer, part of the Hellenic Air Force
- KEA – Copenhagen School of Design and Technology, Copenhagen, Denmark
- Kanada Esperanto-Asocio, a Canadian non-profit
- Koning Eizenberg Architecture
- Korea Express Air, an airline
- Komma Evrodimokratikis Ananeosis, a political party in Cyprus created by Alexis Galanos

== Computing ==
- Kea (software), DHCP server software under development by Internet Systems Consortium
- Keyphrase Extraction Algorithm, an algorithm for extracting keyphrases from text documents

== Places ==
- Kea Province, Greece
- Kea (island), an island in the Cyclades archipelago, Greece
- Kea Channel, Aegean Sea
- Kea, Cornwall, United Kingdom, a civil parish and village
- Kea Nunataks, Mount Bird, Ross Dependency, Antarctica

== People ==
- Saint Kea, late 5th-century British Christian saint
- Cornelia Kea Bouman (1903–1998), Dutch tennis player, only Dutch woman Grand Slam winner and first Dutch woman Olympic medalist in any sport
- Kea Homan (1939–2024), Dutch painter and graphic artist
- Kea W. Riggs (born 1965), American attorney and United States district judge
- Kea Tawana (c. 1935–2016), American artist
- Clarence Kea (born 1959), American basketball player
- Ed Kea (1948–1999), Dutch-Canadian ice hockey player
- Paris Kea (born 1996), American Women's National Basketball Association player
- Kea Sahorn, Cambodian politician elected in 2003
- Salaria Kea (1913–1990), African-American nurse and desegregation activist

== Other uses ==
- Kea, a "beaver" in the New Zealand Boy Scouts
- Kea (ferry), operating in Auckland harbour, New Zealand
- Kill 'Em All, Metallica's debut album

== See also ==
- KEAS (disambiguation)
- KIA (disambiguation)
- Kya (disambiguation)
