= KEAS =

KEAS may refer to:

- Knots Equivalent Air Speed, a comparative airspeed corrected for the compressibility of air at high speed or high altitude
- KEAS (AM), a defunct radio station (1590 AM) formerly licensed to Eastland, Texas, United States
- KEAS Tabernacle Christian Methodist Episcopal Church

== See also ==
- KEA (disambiguation)
