= Fullers GreatSights Bay of Islands =

Fullers GreatSights Bay Of Islands
- Type: Subsidiary
- Industry: Travel and Tourism
- Founded: 1887
- Founder: Albert Ernest Fuller
- Defunct: 31 July 2021
- Headquarters: Paihia, Bay of Islands, New Zealand
- Area served: Bay of Islands
- Services: Cruises, land tours, transport
- Parent: Explore Group
- Website: https://www.dolphincruises.co.nz

Fullers GreatSights is a major tourism company based in Northland, New Zealand. Today it is Northland's largest marine tourism operator with a wide range of cruises and land tours.

== History ==
In 1887, Albert Ernest Fuller launched the "Undine" sailing ship in the Bay of Islands to deliver coal supplies to the islands within the Bay. With the fitting of a motor in the early 1900s, Fuller was able to deliver the coal and essential supplies to communities as far out as Cape Brett. In 1927 Fuller acquired the "Cream Trip" from Eddie Lane – with the facilities on board to transport cream from the islands, and by the 1960s, the well known ‘Bay Belle’ started this run. Although a modern catamaran now takes this historical route (The Cream Trip), the Bay Belle continues to transport visitors and locals between Paihia and Russell throughout the day.

The company expanded to Auckland and became Fullers Corporation. In 1989 Fullers Corporation split into the Bay of Islands company and the Auckland operations, which were taken over by what is now Fullers360.

In December 2008 Fullers Bay of Islands was rebranded Fullers GreatSights to bring it in line with InterCity Group's parent sightseeing brand of GreatSights New Zealand. It offers a range of Bay of Islands cruises and day tours around the region and operates passenger and vehicle ferries between Paihia and Russell/Opua and Okiato.

In 2019 InterCity Group rebranded as Entrada Travel Group, to distinguish itself from its individual operators.

In July 2021, Entrada Travel Group sold Fullers GreatSights' operation (i.e. key assets and the Fullers GreatSights brand) to New Zealand-based marine tourism operator, Explore Group. Explore Group operates cruises and tours in the Bay of Islands and Auckland and also operates out Hamilton Island in Australia. The company remains owned by Entrada Travel Group and was renamed to Northland Ferries Limited on the 2nd of August 2021. The remaining fleet, now owned by Explore Group, still operates under the Fullers GreatSights brand. The company has been mostly integrated within Explore Group Ltd. Northland Ferries now operates the Opua-Okiato and Rawene/Narrows Car Ferry services, and the Paihia-Russell Passenger service.

== Vessels ==
The Fleet of Fullers Greatsights Includes:

- Dolphin Seeker — 23.4 metres, Built in 2001 by Q-West Boat Builders of Whanganui for Kings Tours & Cruises.
- Te Maki — 23.9 metres, Built in 2017 by Challenge Marine of Nelson for Fullers Greatsights.
- Te Papahu — 17.7 metres, Unknown Builder or Year of Construction
- Island Adventurer — 12.6 metres, Built by Naiad.

Former Vessels:

- Bay Belle II — 16 metres, Built in 2011 by Gough Brothers of Invercargill for Fullers Greatsights. Transferred to Northland Ferries in August 2021.
- Tangaroa III — 19.8 metres, Built in 1999 by Cercia and designed by Teknicraft. And is now called 'Picking Daisies'.
Images of the Vessels
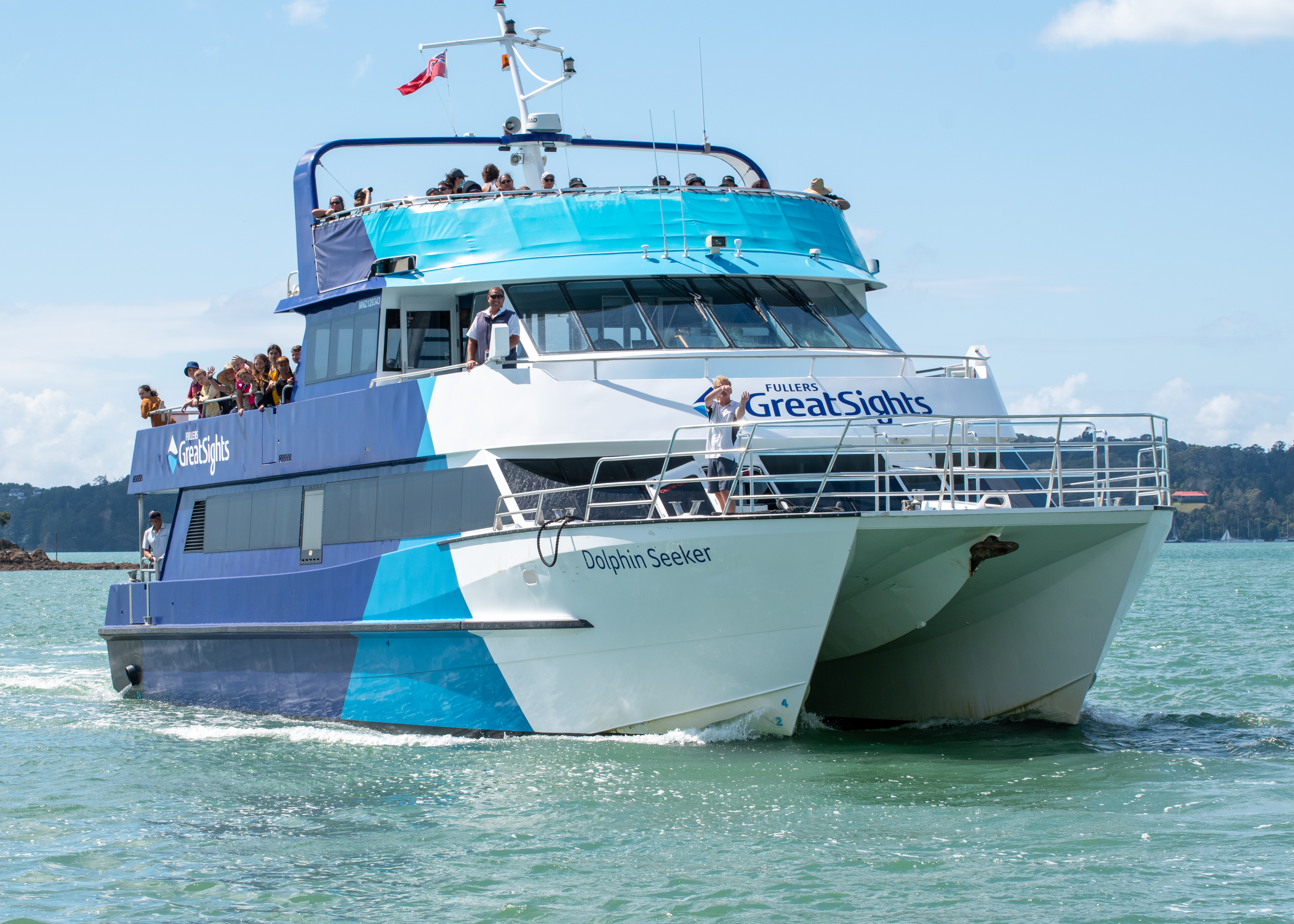
Dolphin Seeker

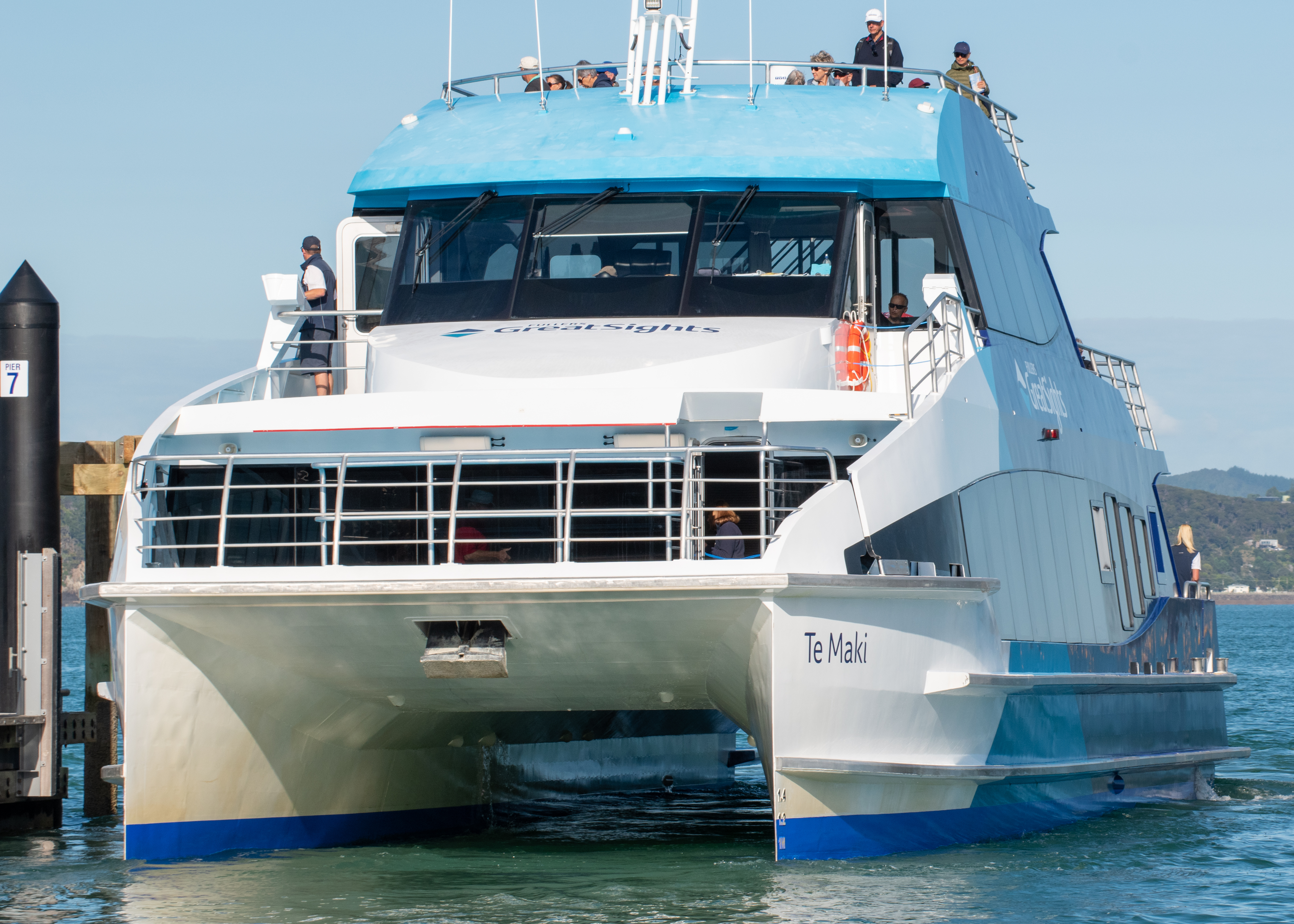
Te Maki

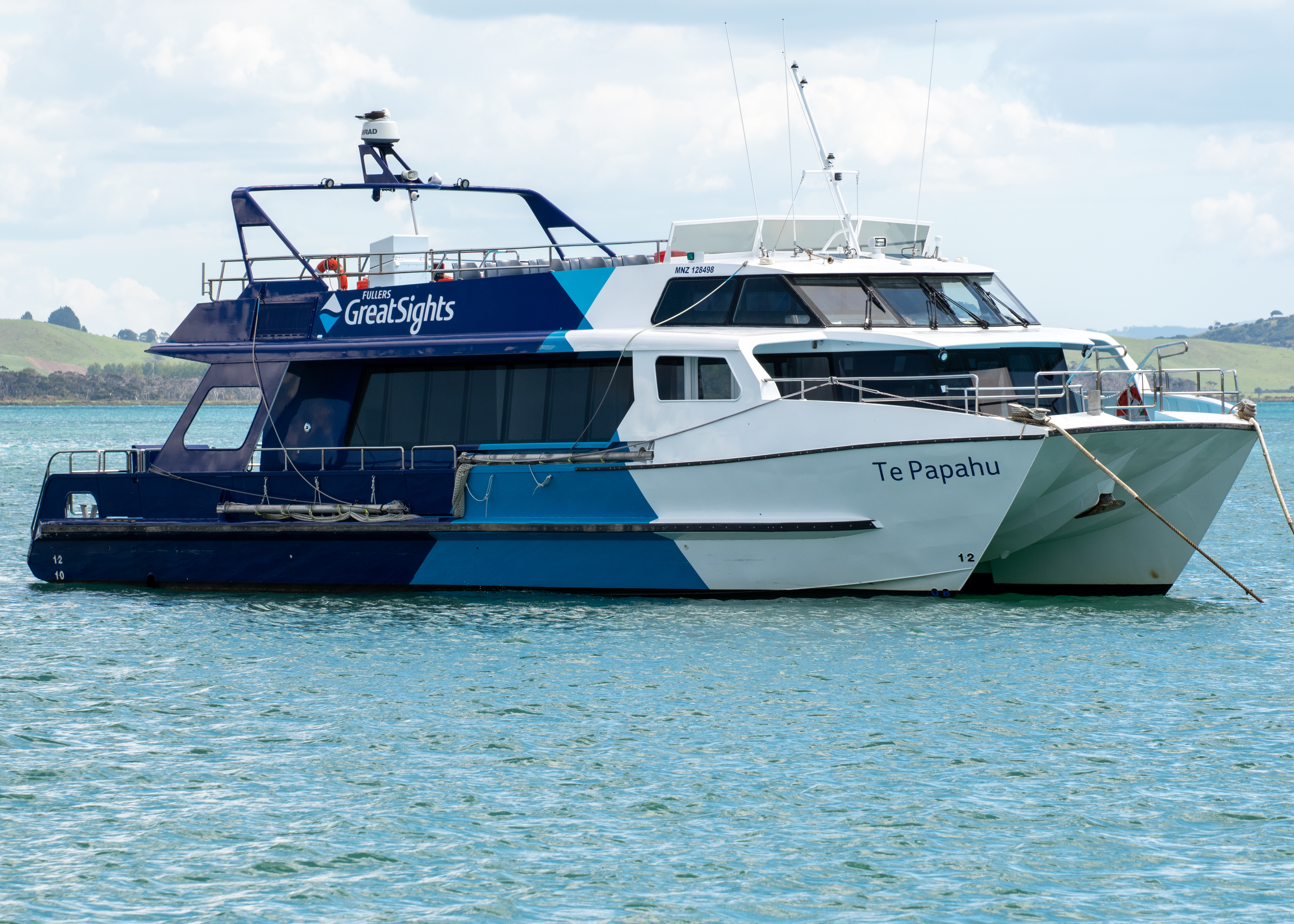
Te Papahu

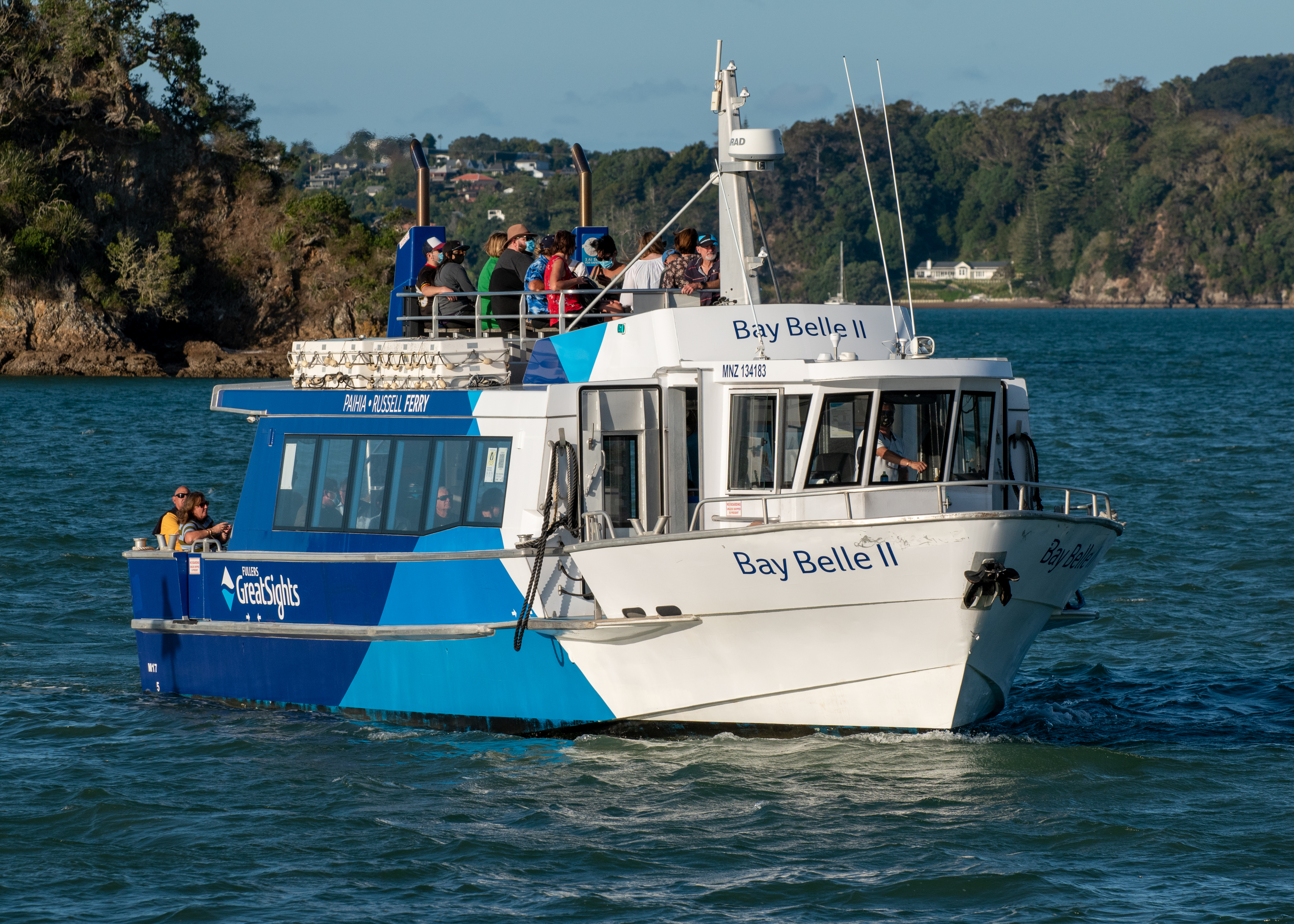
Bay Belle II before August 2021

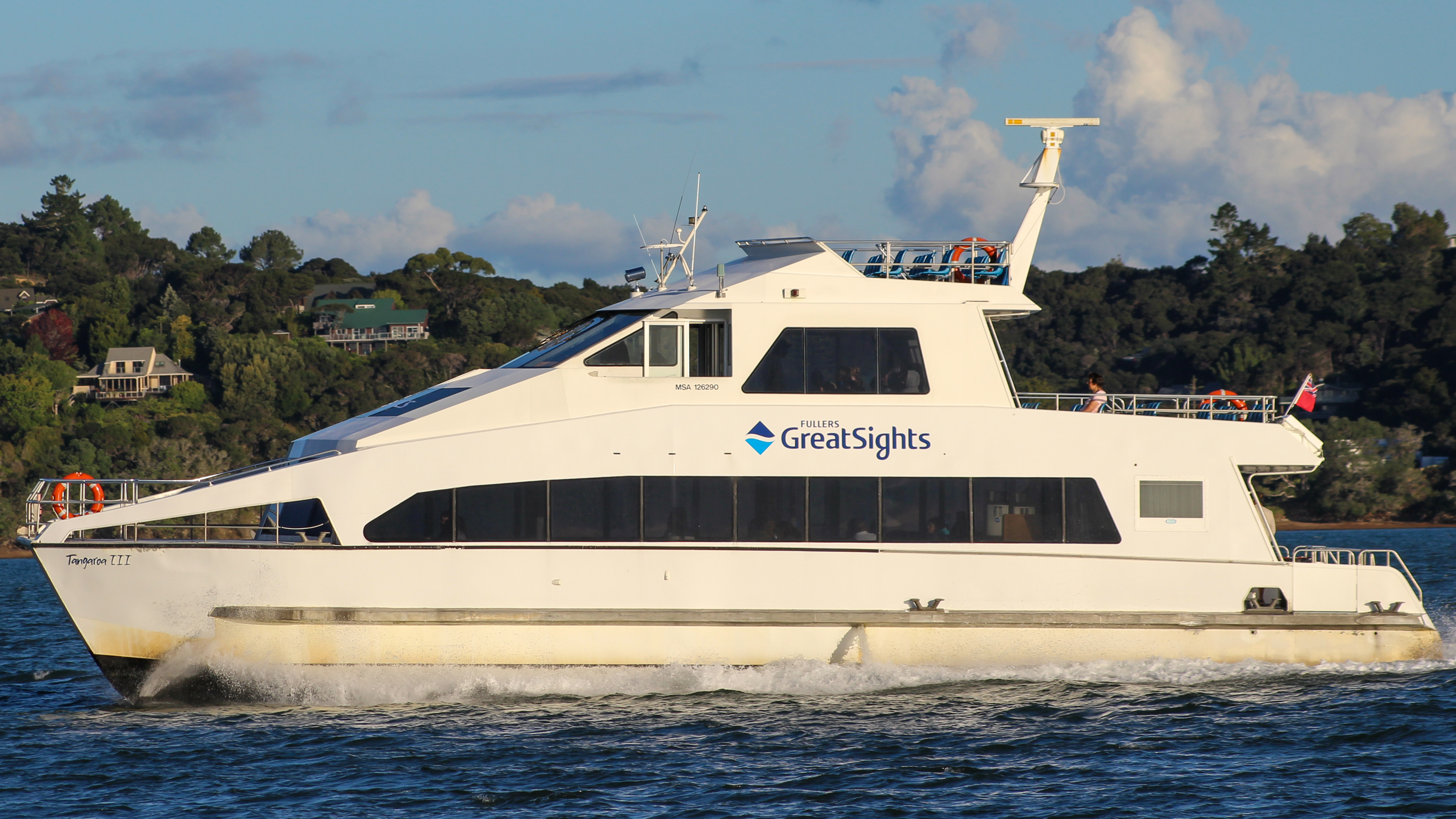
Tangaroa III prior to retirement in Late 2017
