= SeaLink New Zealand =

Ferry operator in Auckland, New Zealand

- Type: Private
- Industry: Ferry & Logistics Company
- Founded: 1 November 1960 (as Subtrizky Shipping Services)
- Founder: Herbert Subritzky
- Headquarters: Auckland, New Zealand
- Area served: Auckland
- Services: Auckland Car and Passenger Ferry Services, Logistics
- Owner: Lyncroft Holdings Ltd
- Website: www.sealink.co.nz/

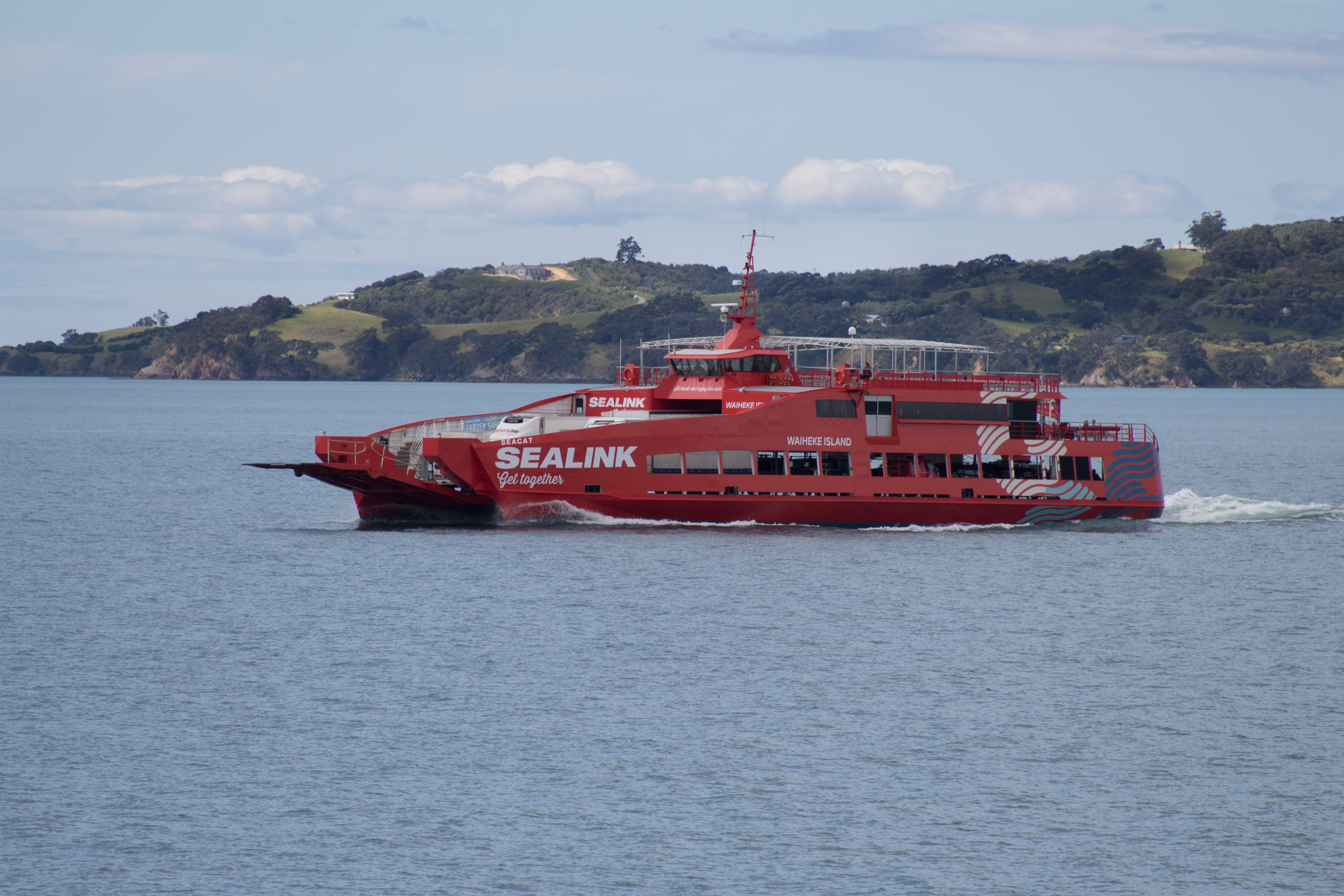
The Seacat near Waiheke Island

SeaLink New Zealand, formerly part of SeaLink Travel Group, operates a vehicle, passenger and freight ferry service on the Hauraki Gulf in Auckland.

== History ==
SeaLink NZ started as a ferry company owned by the Subritzky family in Auckland in 1960. During this time it went by various trading names including Subritzky Shipping, Subritzky Shipping Line, and Subritzky on the Hauraki Gulf. A change of ownership in 2004 saw the purchase of the company by Kangaroo Island SeaLink, a leading South Australian tourism company and in December 2005 the company was renamed the SeaLink Travel Group. At this point, the company started to focus on tourism and the SeaLink Holidays brand was born.

Subritzky Shipping operated the first self-propelled vehicle ferry to Waiheke Island with the vessel Port Kennedy. Later on, the company began to trade as SubritzkyLine. Before being sold to SeaLink, the SubritzkyLine fleet was as follows:

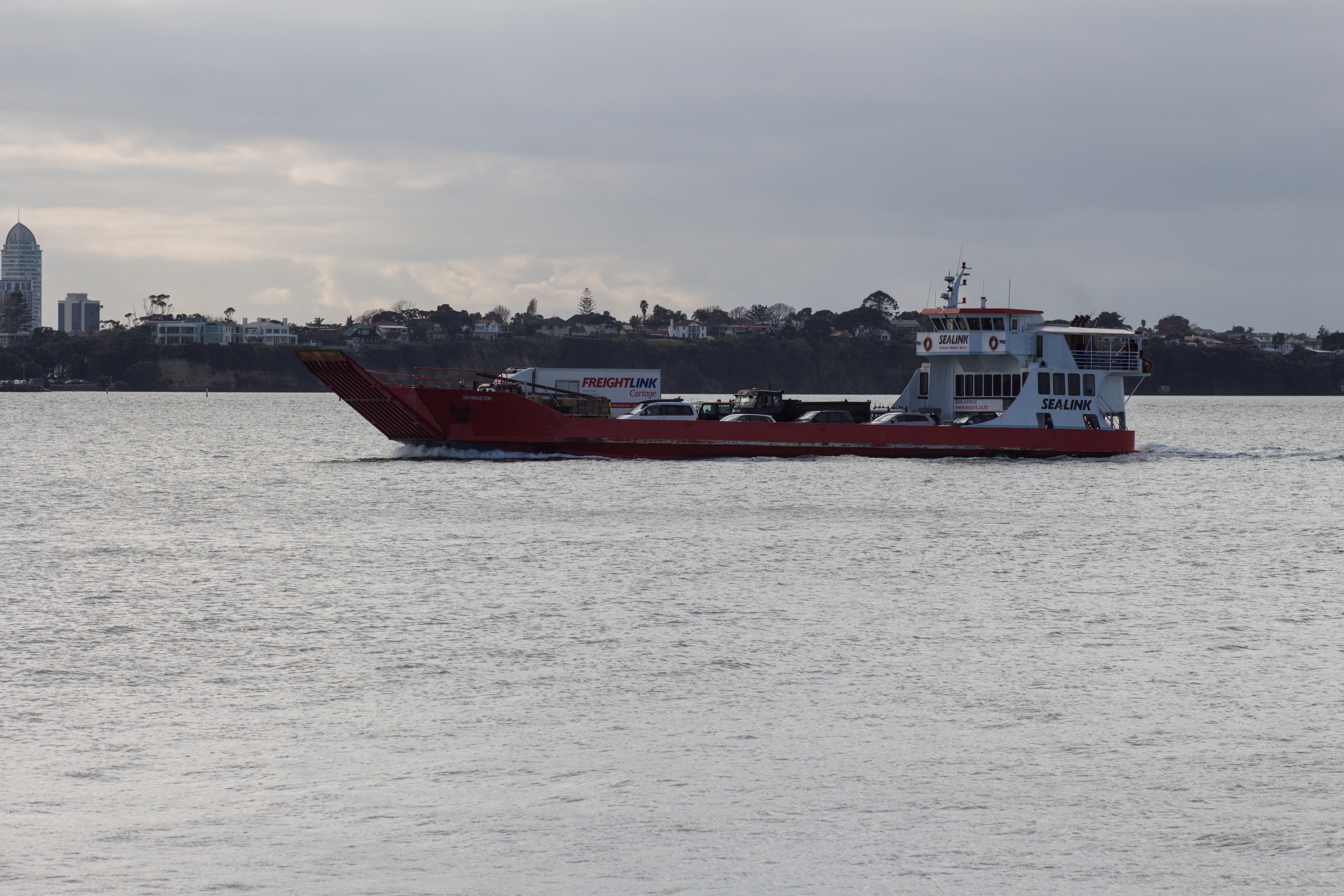
The Seamaster arriving at Wynyard Wharf

- Port Kennedy - Bowloader
- HA Subritzky - Bowloader
- MN Subritzky - Bowloader
- BK Subritzky - Bowloader - Built 2001, freight only vessel
- SeaLink - Sternloader - operated Great Barrier Island service.
- Seaway II - Catamaran - Built 1996
- Seacat - Catamaran - Built 2004

After the purchase of the Seacat, SubritzkyLine came into financial trouble.

In September 2004, SeaLink Kangaroo Island purchased SubritzkyLine. The sale included only four vessels. SeaLink brought over the vessel Island Navigator for the Great Barrier Island services.

In December 2005, the company began operating under the SeaLink brand.

FreightLink was renamed as SeaLink Logistics in 2018 when it was brought under the SeaLink Travel Group umbrella.

In 2011 the company quietly reverted to New Zealand ownership after 7 successful years in the hands of SeaLink Travel Group in Australia and is now owned by Lyncroft Properties.

In 2014 SeaLink purchased Pine Harbour ferries, adding three fast passenger ferries to the fleet. Closely followed was the purchase of Clipper V (a second 98 seater) giving Pine Harbour a total of four passenger ferries to cover the Pine Harbour to Pier 1D, Auckland City commuter service.

== Fleet ==
Name	Image	Shipyard	Launched	Capacity	Tonnage	Length
Sea Quest		Guangzhou Huahang Shipbuilding, Guangzhou, China; Jianglong Shipbuilding, Zhuhai, China	2022; 4 years ago	30 cars 10 bikes 299 passengers	497 GT	44.8m
Seabridge		Heron Ship Repair, Whangārei, New Zealand	2013; 13 years ago	24 cars 10 bikes 250 passengers	482 GT	46.22m
Seacat		South Pacific Marine, Burpengary, Australia; Southern Hemisphere Shipyards, Brisbane, Australia	2004; 22 years ago	55 cars 10 bikes 400 passengers	573 GT	49.5m
Seaway II		Australia	1996; 30 years ago	24 cars 10 bikes 300 passengers	281 GT	37.85m
Island Navigator		Australia	1988; 38 years ago	53 cars 10 bikes 195 passengers	361 GT	37.95m
Seamaster (relocated to Fiji in 2023)		Whangārei, New Zealand	1986; 40 years ago	25 cars 10 bikes 300 passengers		41.38m
Pine Harbour Passenger Ferries
Clipper V		Q-West, Whanganui, New Zealand	2015; 11 years ago	98		17.7m
Clipper IV		Q-West, Whanganui, New Zealand	2011; 15 years ago	98		17.7m
Clipper III		Q-West, Whanganui, New Zealand	2008; 18 years ago	48		14.95m
Clipper II		Q-West, Whanganui, New Zealand	2006; 20 years ago	48		14.95m

== Services ==
=== Waiheke Island ===
SeaLink operates up to 13 services a day from Half Moon Bay in East Auckland to Kennedy Point, Waiheke Island. The vessel Seacat operates the majority of these services, with the Seaway II operating services for the morning and evening commuter runs. The vessel Seamaster (formerly the MN Subritzky) focuses on the freight and larger truck operations for SeaLink from Half Moon Bay.

During the Summer period, on a Friday evening, Saturday and Sunday, Seaway II operates a service from Wynyard Quarter in Downtown Auckland to Kennedy Point, Waiheke.

=== Great Barrier Island ===
SeaLink operates the only year-round car and freight ferry service to Great Barrier Island, using the vessel Island Navigator. Services are from Hamer Street, Wynyard Quarter, Auckland to Tryphena Great Barrier Island. Charter services are also available that can arrive into Tryphena, Port Fitzroy and/or Whangaparapara.

=== Pine Harbour ===
SeaLink operates up to 25 services a day from Pine Harbour Marina in Beachlands to the Auckland CBD, using the Clipper Fleet. With Larger Clipper's IV and V operating the peak hour services. From 19 March to 25 April there were Weekend services as a Trial service in partnership with Auckland Transport and Waka Kotahi.

== See also ==
- Public transport in Auckland
- List of Auckland ferries
