= Kia (disambiguation) =

Kia is a Korean automobile manufacturer.

Kia or KIA may also refer to:

== Geography ==
- Kia, Iran, a village in Mazandaran Province, Iran

== People ==
- Gia people, an Aboriginal Australian people also known as Kia
- Kia Abdullah (born 1982), English author and journalist
- Kia Asamiya (born 1963), Japanese manga artist
- Kia Byers (born 1987), Canadian canoeist
- Kia Corthron (born 1961), American playwright, activist, and television writer
- Kia Drayton (born 1983), American model
- Kia Goodwin (born 1973), African-American actress
- Kia Joorabchian (born 1971), Iranian businessman and football investor
- Kia Luby (born 1989), Australian actress and singer
- Kia McNeill (born 1986), American football defender
- Kia Nurse (born 1996), Canadian women's basketball player
- Kia Pegg (born 2000), British actress
- Kia Shine (born 1980), American rapper and record producer
- Kia Silverbrook (born 1958), prolific inventor and entrepreneur
- Kia Stevens (born 1977), American professional wrestler
- Kia Vaughn (born 1987), professional women's basketball player
- Kia Zolgharnain (born 1965), soccer player for the Kansas City Comets
- Kirby Ian Andersen, "K.I.A.", cross-genre pop electronica producer from Toronto, Canada

== Acronyms ==
- Kachin Independence Army, in Kachin State, Myanmar
- Khwarizmi International Award
- Killed in action, status for combatants that have been or were killed during combat action
- King's Indian Attack, a chess opening
- Knots indicated airspeed
- Kuwait Investment Authority

=== Airports ===
- Kaiapit Airport, Papua New Guinea; IATA code KIA
- Kabul International Airport, Afghanistan
- Kannur International Airport, India
- Kaohsiung International Airport, Taiwan
- Katowice International Airport, Poland
- Keflavík International Airport, Iceland
- Kelowna International Airport, Canada
- Kempegowda International Airport, India
- Kent International Airport, United Kingdom
- Khartoum International Airport, Sudan
- Kigali International Airport, Rwanda
- Kilimanjaro International Airport, Tanzania
- Kuching International Airport, Malaysia
- Kuwait International Airport
- Kotoka International Airport, the former name for Accra International Airport, Ghana

== Other uses ==
- KIA (comics), Killed in Action, a Marvel Comics supervillain
- Kia (magic), a concept in magic
- Kia (Mortal Kombat), a minor character from the Mortal Kombat game series
- kia, the ISO 639 language code for the Kim language of southern Chad
- Kia Tigers, a South Korean professional baseball team
- Makira woodhen, a species of bird also known as the kia
- Kia language

== See also ==
- Kea (disambiguation)
- Kya (disambiguation)
- K1A (disambiguation)
