= Wheatstone LNG =

Liquefied natural gas plant in Western Australia

Wheatstone LNG is a liquefied natural gas plant operating in the Ashburton North Strategic Industrial Area, which is located 12 kilometres (7.5 mi) west of Onslow, Western Australia. The project is operated by Chevron.

== History ==
The Wheatstone gas field was discovered in the Greater Gorgon Area in 2004. The final investment decision was made in September 2011, and construction began in December 2011. The first shipment was made in October 2017.

As of late March, 2026, from damage "likely caused by Tropical Cyclone Narelle," the Wheatstone and Gorgon gas facilities, which "collectively produce about 6.5% of the world’s liquefied natural gas and nearly half of Western Australia’s domestic gas supply, according to Chevron", were offline in what was already a challenging time in world energy markets.

== Technical description ==
The project is expected to cost A$29 billion (US$29.7 billion). The LNG liquefaction and export plant will have an annual capacity of 15 million tonnes of LNG. In the first stage, the plant will have a gas plant, and two LNG trains with a capacity of 4.3 million tonnes per year each. It will be supplied from the Wheatstone, Iago, Julimar and Brunello offshore gas fields.

== Contractors ==
Front-end engineering and design works of the project are being performed by three companies. Bechtel is undertaking the design of the onshore gas plant. Intecsea, a subsidiary of Worley, is designing the subsea infrastructure and trunkline. And Technip is designing the offshore processing platform. Geotechnical consultation for the design and construction of the LNG plant and associated infrastructure will be provided by Golder Associates. Liquefied natural gas storage and condensate tanks to be built by a joint venture between Thiess and EV LNG Australia,, a subsidiary of Vinci.

Ready-for-startup operations support services will be provided by ODL, a subsidiary of Wood Group. The operability, reliability and maintainability contract was awarded to Clough AMEC.

== Developer ==
Chevron owns 72 percent of the project. Shell owns 6.4 percent of the project; Woodside Energy owns 13 percent, Kufpec Australia, a subsidiary of the Kuwait Foreign Petroleum Exploration Company, owns 7 percent; and Kyushu Electric Power owns 1.6 percent of the project.

== Exports ==
3.1 million tonnes of LNG per year will be exported to Tokyo Electric. Korea Gas Corp. (KOGAS) will buy 1.5 million tonnes per year. Tohoku Electric and Chubu Electric will each buy 1 million tons per year. 300,000 tonnes per year will be exported to Kyushu Electric.

== See also ==
- Browse LNG
- Gladstone LNG
