= Kya =

Kya, kya or KYA may also refer to:

== People or fictional characters ==
- Kya Lau, chef and contestant on MasterChef Junior, season 4
- Kya Placide (born 2004), Welsh bobsledder and sprinter
- Kya, mother of Katara and Sokka, in Avatar: The Last Airbender
- Kya, daughter of Aang and Katara in The Legend of Korra
- KYA, Christina Parie's former stage name

== Other uses ==
- kya (unit), an abbreviation for "kilo years ago", that is, a thousand years ago
- Konya Airport's IATA code
- KYA (AM), a San Francisco, California, radio station
- KYA-FM, a San Francisco, California, radio station
- Kentucky Youth Assembly (KYA), a YMCA Youth and Government model Legislature program.

== See also ==
- Kea (disambiguation)
- Kia (disambiguation)
- Kya: Dark Lineage, a 2003 video game
- Kyai, an expert in Islam
