= Explore Group =

Ferry & tourism company in New Zealand and Australia

- Company type: Private
- Industry: Ferry & tourism company
- Founded: 2001; 25 years ago in Auckland
- Headquarters: Auckland, New Zealand
- Area served: Auckland; Bay of Islands; Whitsundays
- Key people: William Goodfellow
- Parent: Moturua Properties Limited
- Divisions: Explore New Zealand; Explore Australia; Fullers GreatSights Bay of Islands
- Website: exploregroup.co.nz

Explore Group Limited is a ferry and tourism company located in New Zealand and Australia. The company operates in the Bay of Islands, Whitsunday Islands, Hauraki Gulf and Waitematā Harbour. Explore operates sailing experiences on former Americas Cup Yachts, excursions and public transport ferry services for Auckland Transport.

== History ==
In 2014 Explore began an Auckland to Waiheke Island service. However, in 2016, plagued by infrastructure and passenger number issues, the company was forced to end the service, leaving Fullers360 the sole passenger ferry company operating services to the island.

Explore began expanding in July 2021 by buying Fullers GreatSights Bay of Islands.

Following the announcement from Fullers360 that on 1 October 2023, ferry services to Birkenhead, Te Onewa/Northcote Pt and Bayswater would be suspended, Explore Group announced on 15 September 2023 that Auckland Transport had contracted them to take over operations of Fuller's cancelled routes - marking Explore's reentry into the public transport industry.

== Auckland Vessels ==
Name	Image	Shipyard	Launched	Capacity	Length	Class/type	Notes
Tuhi Rapa		(Australia) Aluminium Marine, Brisbane	2022; 4 year ago	300; 30 bikes	29m	IC22043	
Island Explorer		(Australia) Aluminium Marine, Brisbane	2018; 8 years ago	170; 40 bikes	21m	IC17050	Relocated from the Whitsunday Islands
Discovery IV (D4)		(New Zealand) Q-West, Whanganui	1998; 28 years ago	80	17.1m		Relocated from the Bay of Islands
Ngārapa		(New Zealand) Wooden Boat Workshop, Parnell	1996; 30 years ago	55	15		Relocated from the Bay of Islands. Previously called Discovery III. (Note: For a period of time, there were two ferries called Discovery III (D3), one owned by Explore and one owned by Fullers. Explore's vessel has since been renamed to Ngārapa.)
