= K1A =

K1A may refer to:

- Haplogroup L-M20, also called haplogroup K1a
- GSR Class K1a, a type of a steam locomotive
- K1A, an variant of Daewoo Precision Industries K1
- K1A, a postal code assigned to Government of Canada; see List of postal codes of Canada: K
- Line K1A, in Chengdu BRT
- Haplogroup K1a, a branch of subclade K1 in Haplogroup K (mtDNA)

== See also ==
- KIA (disambiguation)
