= Gladstone LNG =

Liquefied natural gas plant in Queensland, Australia

GLNG

Gladstone LNG (GLNG) is a liquefied natural gas (LNG) plant in Queensland, Australia. It is a leading project in the conversion of coal seam gas (coalbed methane) into LNG. The project was announced in July 2007. Its first LNG tanker load departed 16 Oct 2015. The second LNG production train began making LNG on 26 May 2016

== Technical features ==
The project involves the production of coal seam natural gas in the Surat and Bowen basins in eastern Queensland, which surround the regional centres of Roma and Fairview. Gas will be piped (520 km) to a gas liquefaction plant at Hamilton Point West on Curtis Island near Gladstone, Queensland. There, coal seam natural gas will be converted into LNG.

The initial annual capacity of the LNG plant was between 3 million and 4 million tonnes of LNG when the first production train entered service in 2015. Annual capacity doubled when the second train came on line in 2016.

The front-end engineering and design (FEED) phase of the project was carried out by Foster Wheeler and Bechtel. A final investment decision on the GLNG project was approved by the State and Federal Governments in May and September 2010 respectively.

== Environmental Impact ==
=== 1 Dredging ===
Gladstone Harbour is a natural deep water port off the coast of Queensland (Port of Gladstone - Wikipedia, n.d.), while Citrus island does not possess these natural deep waters. In order for this port to be viable, Santos needs to dredge out massive amounts of the sea floor (n.d.). Dredging involves removing sediment from the sea floor and moving it to a different location. According to original Santos plans, over 60,750 m3 of soil is to be dredged around five berths (n.d.). The commonwealth government has approved the dumping around the harbour mouth, which is about 1 km away from the Great Barrier Reef exclusion zone (Hunt, 2011). This dredging is causing massive problems around the Gladstone and Great Barrier Reef area.

==== 1.1 Water Quality ====
In 2011 the port of Gladstone was forced to ban all fishing for three weeks because masses of dead and injured fishes, turtles and dugongs were found within the harbour (Dredging and Shipping Near the Great Barrier Reef, n.d.). This incident was never fully investigated, but the dredging within the harbour is the only explainable answer (Williams, 2011). Decreases in prawns, crabs and fish were also noted around the harbour. This decline is caused by a combination of increased disease and mortality rates (caused by toxins in the water) and movement of wildlife away from loud noises and low water quality (Landos, 2012).

===== 1.1.1 Turbidity =====
Data revealed from the Port of Gladstone's website shows that the dredging around Citrus island has exceeded the permit conditions for water turbidity (Landos, 2012). Dumping sediment so close to the Great Barrier Reef have been shown to have an adverse effect on the coral (Landos, 2012). A study carried out by Nature Magazine (Jones et al., 2020) revealed that as the water turbidity went up, the corals suffered more, even leading to partial coral death. The experiment was carried out over 42 days on multiple specimens, all exposed to different amounts of turbidity. The results showed that high turbidity could cause 2 – 10% partial coral death, loss of colour, including full coral bleaching, and a definite loss of lipids in all samples (Jones et al., 2020). Dredging this close to the great barrier reef and for the same amount of time would have heavily affected not only the coral but also the animals that live in the area.

==== 1.2 Toxicity of sediments ====
It's not only the turbidity of the water that's affecting the reef but also the toxic substances in the sediment. In the opinion of the FFVS(Future Fisheries Veterinary Service) (Landos, 2012), the resuspension of sediments in Gladstone harbour, especially PASS(Potential Acid Sulphate Soil) (which were present in large areas of dredged sediment in Gladstone harbour), have caused the release of large amounts of dissolved metals (including copper, zinc and aluminium) into the water (Landos, 2012). Comparing these values to historical data, it has been concluded that these elevations are as a direct cause of the dredging. These metals, especially PASS, affect marine wildlife in major ways (Landos, 2012).

===== 1.2.1 Physiological Effects =====
These elements in large amounts in fish are known to inactivate enzymes by binding to amino, imino and sulfhydryl proteins or may damage cells by disrupting metabolic pathways (Landos, 2012). These metals have been shown to have a suppressive effect on the immune system of marine wildlife, which increases their susceptibility to diseases and parasitic infections (Landos, 2012). Exposure to metallic contaminants have also been linked to a long-term impairment of olfaction (the ability to smell). These affect anti-predator behaviour and responses to alarm cues in fish (Landos, 2012). This exposure has also been shown to cause irreparable damage to the gills and the surrounding structure (Landos, 2012).

===== 1.2.2 Changes in behaviour =====
These metals in Gladstone harbour have been shown to negatively affect the behaviour of fish, including predator avoidance, reproduction, and social behaviour (Landos, 2012).

==== 1.3 Effect of Dredging sounds on fish ====
Commonly dredging operations sound levels range from 111 to 170 dB (Wenger et al., 2017). This noise level has been shown to affect fishes in numerous ways, including behavioural changes, inability to hear points of interest, stress and phycological reactions, hearing loss and damage to auditory tissue, physical cell damage and possible mortality, impairment of the lateral line system (a sensory system that lets fish detect weak water motions and pressure gradients) and effects eggs and larvae (Wenger et al., 2017).

==== 1.4. Physical Loss of Habitat ====
The ecological importance of nurseries for fish and crabs and feeding grounds for dugongs and turtles have guaranteed their protection from dredging. But masses of seagrass, mangroves and mudflats didn't have the same fate (Landos, 2012). Dredging and removal of these areas have impacted the sustainability of fisheries (where a fish breeds) around the harbour. Because coastal ecosystems are interconnected, a loss in fishery production is expected when removing large swaths of habitat (Connolly, et al., 2006). This is exactly what happened in Gladstone harbour, an effect that is highly likely to affect areas well outside of Gladstone harbour (Landos, 2012). This problem is made significantly worse by the fact that Gladstone port has the only significant area of seagrass for 170 km to the north and south (Connolly, et al., 2006). Even after the dredging has concluded it is unlikely that fishery production will ever recover.

=== 2. Increased shipping traffic around the great barrier reef ===
Each year more than 11,000 ships traverse the waters around the Great Barrier Reef (Dredging and Shipping Near the Great Barrier Reef, n.d.). 350 of whom are bulk LNG carriers departing Gladstone (Record exports of LNG leave Gladstone in 2020–21, 2021). A singular ship traversing the great barrier reef causes only low-level damage, but as the shipping volume increases, these damages can accumulate significantly over time. Examples of these include damage from anchors and propellers, the introduction of invasive species, greenhouse gas and nitrogen oxide emission, and contamination from coal dust, sewage, and compounds, including oil and heavy metals (Shipping in the Great Barrier Reef: the miners' highway, 2022). This extra number of ships is increasing the likelihood of strikes on dugongs, turtles, whales, and other mammals. While also exposing them to excessive noise and light pollution (see 1.3) (Shipping in the Great Barrier Reef: the miners' highway, 2022).

== Project Completion and Operation ==
GLNG exported its first load of LNG on 16 October 2015. Queensland Premier Annastacia Palaszczuk, Minister for State Development Dr Anthony Lynham and Member for Gladstone Glenn Butcher were in Gladstone for the milestone to mark the first shipment. The Malaysian LNG tanker Seri Bakti transported the shipment to GLNG's customers in South Korea.

=== Ferries ===
When construction began in 2011, Sealink Travel Group was contracted to provide a crew transfer service, between the mainland and Curtis Island. Five EnviroCat-class vessels were commissioned specifically for this project, each with a capacity of 400 passengers. The original fleet of five was sold when construction finished in 2016:

- Capricornian Surfer: sold to Fullers360, and renamed Kekeno. It now operates as a passenger ferry in Auckland.
- Capricornian Dancer: wet leased to Port Phillip Ferries before being sold to Fullers360, and renamed Ika Kākahi. It now operates as a passenger ferry in Auckland.
- Capricornian Sunrise: relocated to SeaLink Rottnest Island
- Capricornian Sunset: relocated to SeaLink Rottnest Island
- Capricornian Spirit: relocated to Sydney for the Manly Fast Ferry, but later returned to Gladstone.

== Partners ==
It is being developed by the Australian energy company Santos Limited The joint venture arrangement is Santos 30%; PETRONAS 27.5%; Total 27.5%; and KOGAS 15%.

== See also ==
- Wheatstone LNG and Browse LNG in Western Australia
- QCLNG and APLNG in Queensland
