= Kea (ferry) =

New Zealand commercial passenger ferry

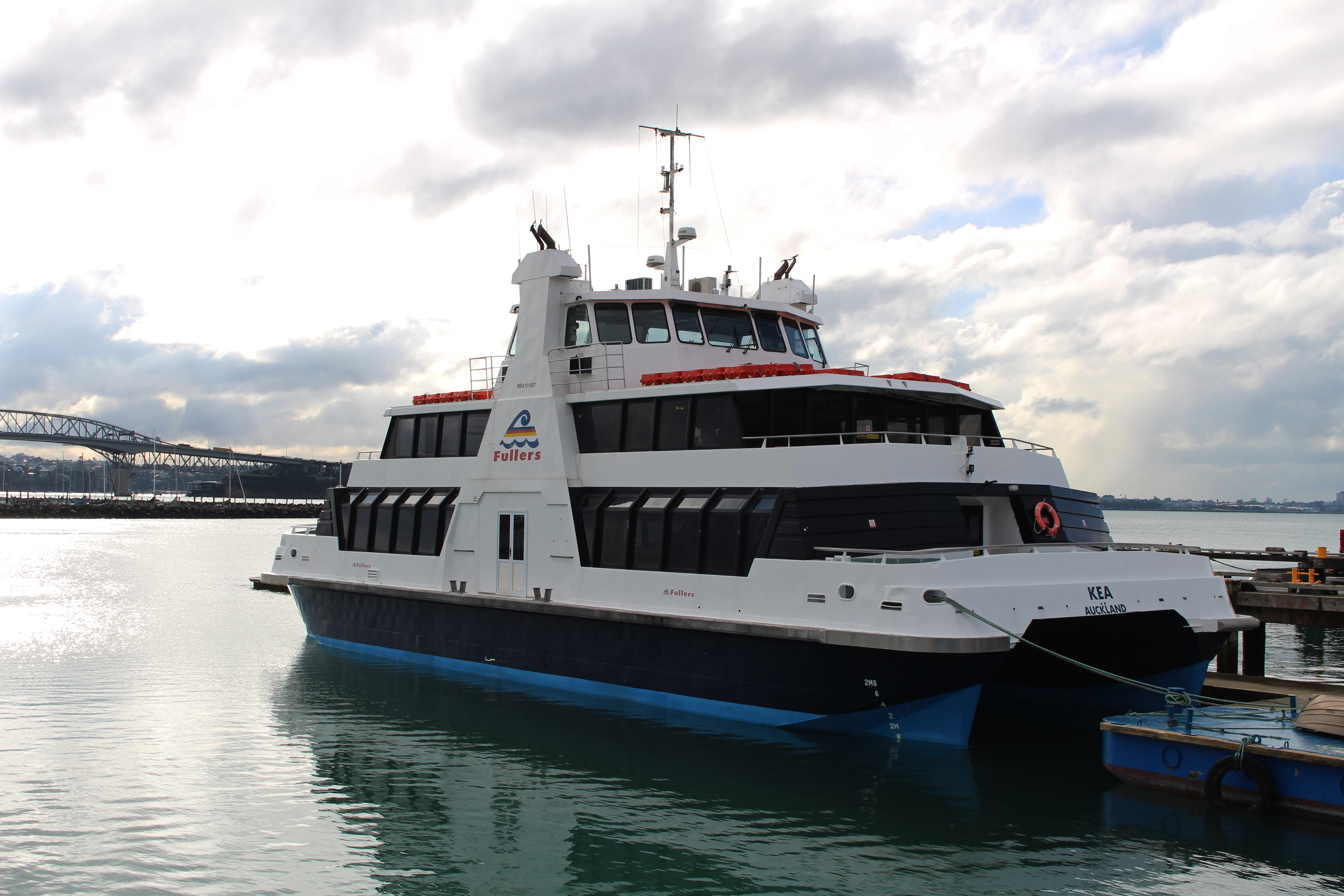
- Kea at Silo Park

History

New Zealand
- Namesake: Kea
- Owner: Fullers360
- Builder: WECO
- Commissioned: 1988
- Out of service: 2020
- Home port: Auckland
- Fate: Scrapped in 2023

General characteristics
- Class & type: Commercial Passenger Ferry
- Displacement: 341 tons
- Length: 27.09 metres
- Beam: 10 metres
- Speed: 12 knots
- Complement: 411 passengers
- Crew: 2

M.V. Kea (sometimes called the Seabus Kea) was a commercial passenger ferry that operated the busy New Zealand Devonport-Downtown Auckland express route for Fullers360 (Auckland's largest ferry operator). The Kea operated a regular service departing from Downtown Auckland every half-hour.

The Kea entered service in 1988 as the 14th ferry of the company.

The bridge area formed a third deck. Her distinctive design is similar to earlier Auckland ferries, such as the Kestrel, in that she is longitudinally symmetrical, effectively meaning that she can be driven both ways, so that no U-Turns at the starts or finishes of crossings have to be made. This enabled the Kea to maintain a half-hourly express service between Downtown Auckland and Devonport.

In 2007, she was removed from the water and given a substantial overhaul in a shipyard in the Western Reclamation, including major work on both engines.

In 2006, the Kea was involved in a minor collision at the Auckland Ferry Terminal with the moored Starflyte, due to steering failure.

In February 2015, the Kea was again involved in a collision, this time at the Devonport Ferry Terminal. No other vessel was involved.

In 2020, the Kea was withdrawn from service. In 2023, she was towed to Whangārei and scrapped.
