= KEAS (AM) =

Eastland, Texas; United States
- Broadcast area: Eastland County, Texas
- Frequency: 1590 kHz

Programming
- Language: English
- Format: Defunct

Ownership
- Owner: M&M Broadcasters, Ltd.
- Sister stations: KCLE, KVTT

History
- First air date: August 1953
- Former call signs: KERC (1953–1983)
- Call sign meaning: EAStland

Technical information
- Facility ID: 70621
- Class: A
- Power: 500 watts (day only)
- Transmitter coordinates: 32°23′47″N 98°46′27″W

KEAS (1590 AM) was an American radio station licensed to serve Eastland, the county seat of Eastland County, Texas, United States. Established in 1953, the station's broadcast license was held by M&M Broadcasters, Ltd., when it was cancelled voluntarily in 2010. KEAS last broadcast a country music format.

== History ==
=== KERC era ===
This station was founded in August 1953 as "KERC" (for the towns of Eastland, Ranger, and Cisco) by the Tri-Cities Broadcasting Company of Eastland County. In 1954, the station began hosting the weekly "Tri-County Jamboree" at the Eastland Sports Arena. In 1957, country & western music was added to KERC's on-air programming lineup. Country music would become a staple of the station's format for the next 50 years.

The station was sold to the Eastland County Broadcasting Company on June 1, 1961. Carnette Broadcasting, Inc., acquired the station on September 1, 1978. In March 1983, Carnette Broadcasting, Inc., contracted to sell KEAS to Richard L. Whitwirth, James David Bullion, and Owen D. Woodward doing business as Breckenridge Broadcasting Company. The FCC approved the sale on July 26, 1983, and the transaction was formally consummated on August 16, 1983.

=== KEAS era ===
As the station expanded to serve all of Eastland County, the new owners filed a petition with the Federal Communications Commission (FCC) to assigned new call sign "KEAS" to this station on August 1, 1983.

Construction on a new FM sister station for KEAS began in 1985. In March 1986, Breckenridge Broadcasting Company, now under the primary control of Owen D. Woodward, reached an agreement to sell KEAS and the permit for the FM station to WDS Broadcasting Company, owned by Wayne Darren "Dan" Staggs. The FCC approved the sale on April 15, 1986, and the deal was formally consummated on June 5, 1986.

"KEAS-FM" (97.7 FM, now KATX) signed on in 1987. WDS Broadcasting Company owner Dan Staggs died in 1997 and his heirs sought new owners for both stations. In July 1999, WDS Broadcasting reached an agreement to sell both KEAS and KEAS-FM to Partnership Broadcasting, Inc. The FCC approved the deal on September 9, 1999, and the transaction was formally consummated on February 1, 2000.

=== Falling silent ===
On August 18, 2009, KEAS fell silent due to "equipment failure". In September 2009 station management filed a request with the FCC for special temporary authority to remain silent temporarily. With the station still off the air, Partnership Broadcasting made a deal in November 2009 to sell KEAS (without the FM sister station) for $90,000 to M&M Broadcasters, Ltd., which was in turn owned by Gary L. Moss. The FCC granted the remain-silent authority on December 30, 2009, with a scheduled June 28, 2010, expiration. The next day, on December 31, 2009, the FCC approved the sale and the transaction was formally consummated on January 15, 2010.

Just four months later, and without ever returning the radio station to the air, M&M Broadcasters, Ltd., filed a request with the FCC on May 13, 2010, to voluntarily cancel the station's broadcast license. After the license was cancelled, the FCC deleted the KEAS call sign from their database on May 20, 2010. This move cleared the way for M&M Broadcasters to apply for a daytime power increase to co-owned KRQX (1590 AM, now KEKR) in Mexia, Texas, allowing that station to move into the Waco, Texas, market.
