= Goolarabooloo Millibinyarri (Coconut Wells) =

Community in Western Australia

- Coordinates: 17.837°S 122.218°E
- Country: Australia
- State: Western Australia
- LGA: Shire of Broome
- Location: 12 km (7.5 mi) north of Broome, Western Australia

Government
  - State electorate: Kimberley
  - Federal division: Durack
- Elevation: 19 m (62 ft)
- Postcode: 6725
- Mean max temp: 32.2 °C (90.0 °F)
- Mean min temp: 21.2 °C (70.2 °F)
- Annual rainfall: 603.5 mm (23.76 in)

Goolarabooloo Millibinyarri is an Aboriginal community, located 12 km north of Broome in the Kimberley region of Western Australia, within the Shire of Broome.

Goolarabooloo Millibinyarri is located north of Broome along the coast, in a locality known as Coconut Well.

Coconut Well is a small rural living subdivision with about 30 lots. The area was originally established in the 1970s with thoughts of becoming a plantation area, however this did not eventuate due to a lack of available water.

Millibinyarri was established by Paddy Roe in the mid-1970s according to his grandson, Ronald Roe.

== Native title ==
The community is located within the determined area of the Rubibi Community (WAD6006/1998, WAD223/2004) native title claim.

== Governance ==
The community is managed through its incorporated body, Goolarabooloo / Millibinyarri Indigenous Corporation, incorporated under the Corporations (Aboriginal and Torres Strait Islander) Act 2006 on 16 July 2009.

== Town planning ==
Goolarabooloo Millibinyarri Layout Plan No.1 has been prepared in accordance with State Planning Policy 3.2 Aboriginal Settlements. Layout Plan No.1 was endorsed by the community on 20 December 2002 and the Western Australian Planning Commission on 3 August 2005.

The Layout Plan map-set and background report can be viewed at the Department of Planning, Lands and Heritage's website.
