= Paddy Roe =

Aboriginal Elder of the Goolarabooloo people

Paddy Roe OAM (1912–2001), also known as Lulu, was a Nyikina (also spelled Nyigina) Aboriginal man born and raised in the bush by his tribal father, Bulu, and mother, Wallia, at Roebuck Plains on Yawuru country in the remote West Kimberley region of Western Australia. Widely respected for his wisdom and cultural knowledge, he was an acknowledged advocate of reconciliation. His conception totem (jalnga) was Yungurugu (or Yoongoorookoo), the Rainbow Serpent. He had strong maban power.

Lulu was the apical ancestor of the Goolarabooloo people and the founder of the Lurujarri Heritage Trail on the West Kimberley's Dampier Peninsula (part of the Heritage Trails Network of Western Australia). Though speaking seven Aboriginal languages plus Malay and ‘Broome English’, he chose not to learn to read or write, saying it inhibited the unimpeded flow of ‘true feeling’, namely, the knowing emanating from, in his words, the ground at "the bottom of everything.”

When Bulu died, Lulu was still a young boy and the family decided to safeguard him from the dangers of the encroaching colonialists by sending him into the desert, beyond their reach. He was accompanied by his older tribal brother and lifelong mentor, the widely renowned maban man Joe Nangan and several other family members.

They re-emerged eight years later, Lulu now a fully initiated Lawman having been taken into the Law at an unusually young age and passing through all the stages. The returnees camped on Roebuck Plains, which had become a cattle station, and cared for the last of the old Nyikina people while working as station hands. Lulu was soon an accomplished drover and installer/repairer of windmills, so dependable he was left in charge of the station when the manager was on holidays.

Though illiterate, he collaborated with non-Indigenous people in writing several books. The first, Gularabulu: Stories from the West Kimberley, was published in collaboration with Professor Stephen Muecke. It won the Western Australian Week Literary Award in 1985, and the New South Wales Premier's Literary Award the same year.

In 1991, Greg Campbell was invited by Lulu to live on Country and work with him and the Goolarabooloo people to write one book designed to share key elements of the Original Knowledge for people to live in balance with themselves, one another and the world around them, maintaining the balance of all life. The 31-year collaboration extended well beyond Lulu’s lifetime, culminating with the 2022 book Total Reset: Realigning with our timeless holistic blueprint for living and 36-hour audiobook narrated by Nyikina man, accomplished actor and creative, Mark Coles Smith.

Roe was awarded the Medal of the Order of Australia in the 1990 Australia Day Honours for "service to Aboriginal welfare".

== Marriage and custodianship of Country ==
Circa 1931, Lulu ran away to the Damper Peninsula with his wife-to-be, Mary Pikalili, a traditional Karajarri woman. They passed through Rubibi (Broome, part of the land of the Djukun people), continuing north into Ngumbarl and Jabbirjabbir country where they met Walmadan, the powerful, much-respected leader of the Jabbirjabbir people and two equally powerful senior Jabbirjabbir Law women, Nabi and Gardilagan, both janggungurr (female equivalent of a maban man).

The Jabbirjabbir Law women informed Mary she would have two children (to join young Thelma who Mary had with her previous husband). They said two rayi (spirit babies) belonging to Nabi could not enter Nabi because she was too old for children, so they would both enter Mary. She subsequently gave birth to Teresa and Margaret.

The Law women further explained that Mary’s children would have many children who would have many more. Once again, there would be a big mob to exercise custodial care of Country. This was extremely important to the Jabbirjabbir elders because all their young people had been removed by the authorities and placed in missions; the first of the Stolen Generations. Only the old people remained with none to carry on their traditions and care for Country as their ancestors had done for tens of thousands of years.

It is why the old people began walking young Lulu and Mary back and forth through Country (from Broome to Gariyan, south of Carnot Bay) showing them the hundreds of sites along the coast, sharing the associated songs and stories, introducing them to the mamara trees and murruru places (flora and rocks with special power) and providing other essential cultural information. It was how Lulu, Mary and their descendants became the acknowledged custodians of Minyirr Djukun, Ngumbarl and Jabbirjabbir Country (up to Gariyan).

== Protecting Living Country ==
As the West Kimberley came under increasing pressure from developers, miners and tourism, Lulu’s recognised authority to speak for Country meant many of those who wanted to know what might be possible came to his ‘office’, a tamarind tree in Dora Street, Broome where they would find him sitting beneath its shade on the red pindan carving boomerangs, shields and lizards or making decorations for ceremonies.

Despite having witnessed horrors perpetrated on Indigenous people and having personally experienced the oppressive ways of the usurpers he carried no anger or bitterness and remained steadfast in his belief that the way forward meant everyone learning to walk together, starting with the experience of ‘Living Country’.

In 1974, informed by knowledgeable local Aboriginal people that Paddy Roe and his family were the area’s recognised custodians, archaeologist-anthropologist Kim Akerman carried out with them the first archaeological survey of a 16-kilometre stretch of coast north of Minariny (Coulomb Point), recording 36 old Aboriginal camping sites and workshops.

Other collaborative efforts followed to record sites and cultural knowledge. In 1981 South African archaeologist Dr Patricia Vinnicombe, famous for her work with rock art, was introduced to Lulu by Akerman and, on behalf of the WA Museum, worked with him and the family to record more information about the sites and mythology.

To help bring people together and protect the lands and waters for which he and the family carried the cultural knowledge and exercised custodial responsibilities Lulu established the Goolarabooloo Millibinyarri Indigenous Corporation (GMIC) and the now internationally renowned Lurujarri Heritage Trail (also known as the Lurujarri Dreaming Trail).

Lulu’s commitment to preserving Country from harm was illustrated in 1990 when the listed mining company, Terex Resources NL, sought approval to exploit mineral sands on the sacred domain of the Songline. Lulu and the other Majas (senior keepers of the Law) led a range of interests in opposition to it. Though it is rare for objections to mining exploration approvals to succeed in Western Australia, the Warden’s Court upheld the objections and the exploration license was refused, the Warden citing the significant Aboriginal cultural heritage values and environmental values of the area.

== Lurujarri Heritage Trail ==
In the 1980s, Lulu began talking about his vision of Indigenous and non-Indigenous people walking together, camping under the stars and experiencing the power of Living Country and the ways of traditional culture. He dreamed of a walking trail as a means of uniting and uplifting Indigenous and non-Indigenous people alike through the agency of Country, which in turn would provide a way for it to be cared for respectfully.

Lulu’s vision manifested in 1987 with the first walk of the Lurujarri Heritage Trail, two or three happening every year thereafter and continued by his descendants today, usually comprising 20-30 visitors and 20-30 Goolarabooloo men, women and children. The Trail traverses an 80-kilometre section of coast, part of a 450-kilometre-long Songline that winds its way from Swan Point on the northern tip of the Dampier Peninsula to Gariyan (Cape Bossut), south of the Karajarri community of Bidyadanga.

For tens of thousands of years, the members of its seven communities have continued the ceremonies in which the Country of the Songline is sung and renewed and knowledge of First Law transmitted intergenerationally.

The archaeological evidence facilitated by Lulu and the Goolarabooloo people helped attract funding from both State and Federal governments, and in 1988, the Trail was officially designated a heritage trail. In turn, this led to the WA Museum’s Aboriginal Sites Department commissioning archaeologists Elizabeth Bradshaw and Rachel Fry to carry out the first fully professional survey of the entire coastal strip of the Lurujarri Heritage Trail, from Broome to Bindingangun (Yellow Creek).

In 1993, Emeritus Professor Jim Sinatra, head of RMIT University’s Landscape Architecture program in Melbourne, joined Lulu and the Goolarabooloo people in walking the Trail. Sinatra was so impressed by the opportunity it afforded for people to see and know the natural world in a different way that walking the Trail became a course of study for landscape architecture and design students at RMIT, and remains so today.

The first chapter of Sinatra’s 1999 book with compatriot Phin Murphy, Listen to the People, Listen to the Land, introduces readers to Lulu and a different way of seeing and relating with Country with more comprehensive accounts provided in Total Reset (Chapter 25) and in Emmanouil Ouriana’s 2016 PhD thesis, Being with Country: The performance of people–place relationships on The Lurujarri Dreaming Trail.

== Death and legacy ==
Lulu’s peaceful passing on 5 July 2001 was widely reported, Senator Aden Ridgeway, Deputy Leader of the Australian Democrats, standing in the national parliament to deliver a eulogy in which he said, inter alia:

"I would like to bring to the Senate’s attention the passing of a great Australian who was a leader in his own community and someone who generously shared his great wisdom and understanding of our ancient country with all Australians. His name was Paddy Poe (who) established the Goolarabooloo community to protect the region’s Indigenous culture (leading) to the construction in 1987 of the Lurujarri (coastal dunes) Heritage Trail…As Mr Roe said, “We should all come together – European and Aboriginal people, Countryman and Aboriginal man, Black and White – to look after Country”… Despite the history of this one significant man in the Kimberley who has contributed so much to his community, I think that he ought to be remembered as a person who contributed so much to the Australian nation. His life will be remembered far beyond his home country of Broome in Western Australia. I hope that his life experiences will go on teaching young Australians about how it is possible for cultures to coexist and adapt to change but still maintain their own integrity and power. This is a message that was borne out by Mr Roe’s life – it is his legacy."

The enduring impact of that legacy was evident not only in the continuance of the Lurujarri Heritage Trail walks but also in a remarkable struggle by the Goolarabooloo people (2005-2013) to prevent the industrialisation of the land of the Songline when several of the world’s largest corporations sought to build a massive LNG plant at Walmadany (James Price Point) and a port. It was seen as providing the necessary infrastructure for export-orientated mining of the vast, pristine Kimberley region, largely untouched, its ecosystems considered unique on Earth.

The Goolarabooloo people, inspired by their Majas, Joseph Roe, Phillip Roe and Richard Hunter, led one of “the biggest most effective environmental campaigns in Australia’s history,” bringing together people of all interests and persuasions to stand up for the well-being of Country and all life. The case for Country was made out in numerous publications. The full story is told in Total Reset (chapters 30 and 31). Their success illustrated how realities can change when people and Country are functioning as one family under the Dreaming, in line with Lulu’s messaging:

“No more dividin’ people, settin’ one against another, makin’ one more big, one more small. Not the proper way. We all gotta come together, work together – blackfella, whitefella, yellafella, every kinda fella. Don’t matter who we are, if we dig below the white soil on top an’ find that black soil inside at the bottom of everythin’, yair, we can see. Then we know – all one under the Dreamin’ – an’ we go that way.”

== Books and videos ==
• Greg Campbell with Lulu and the Goolarabooloo Family, Total Reset: Realigning with our timeless holistic blueprint for living. 2022, (1st ed. rev., 2023). Dunsborough, WA: Total Reset Publishing.

• Stephen Muecke & Paddy Roe, The Children’s Country: Creation of a Goolarabooloo Future in North-West Australia. 2020. London: Rowman & Littlefield

• Monica Tan. Stranger Country. 2019. Crows Nest, Sydney: Allen & Unwin. pp. 133–175

• Kim Akerman. Brief Notes - Paddy Roe and the Goolarabooloo (Native Title) Findings. 2018. In the private collection of the Goolarabooloo Millibinyarri Indigenous Corporation (GMIC) and published in Total Reset (1st ed. rev. 2023, Appendix 3).

• Jim Sinatra and Phin Murphy, Listen to the People, Listen to the Land, 1999 Melbourne: Melbourne University Press. The 1st chapter (pp. 11–30) focuses on Paddy Roe and the Goolarabooloo family.

• Liz Thompson (compiler), Aboriginal Voices: Contemporary Aboriginal artists, writers and performers. 1990. Simon & Schuster, Australia. The book features 31 Aboriginal writers, painters, dancers and storytellers from western, central and eastern Australia, including Paddy Roe, Jack Davis, Archie Weller and Sally Morgan.

• Krim Benterrak, Stephen Muecke and Paddy Roe, Reading the Country: Introduction to Nomadology. 1984. Revised edition 1996 by Fremantle Arts Centre Press; 2014 edition by re.Press

• Paddy Roe (Stephen Muecke editor), Gularabulu: Stories from the West Kimberley. 1983. South Fremantle: Fremantle Arts Centre Press.

• Video: Inventing Reality (from the 38:25-minute mark) - the fifth of ten one-hour videos in the 1992 series by Harvard professor David Maybury-Lewis, Millennium: Tribal Wisdom and the Modern World. Inventing Reality - Millennium - David Maybury-Lewis

• Video: Protecting the Songlines, sixth episode in the 2015 Canadian television Native Planet series about Indigenous cultures, hosted by Simon Baker. Native Planet – Protecting the ‘Song Lines’
