= Fullers360 =

Ferry and tourism company in Auckland, New Zealand

Fullers Group
- Type: Private
- Industry: Ferry & tourism company
- Founder: George Hudson
- Headquarters: Auckland, New Zealand
- Area served: Auckland
- Brands: Fullers360
- Services: Auckland Commuter and tourist ferry services
- Owner: InMotion Group
- Website: www.fullers.co.nz

Fullers Group Limited, trading as Fullers360, is a ferry and tourism company in Auckland, New Zealand. It operates in the Hauraki Gulf and Waitematā Harbour. Fullers Group is the latest in a long line of almost continuous harbour and gulf ferry operations based in Auckland since the 1870s.

== History ==
George Hudson, and his son, Douglas, conceived an idea for an improved ferry operator to replace the neglected Auckland ferry services during a sailing trip on Waitematā Harbour in 1981. By the end of that year, the Hudson family acquired North Shore Ferries (from Leo Dromgoole), another ferry company in Auckland and renaming it the Devonport Steam Ferry Group (which Gulf Ferries Ltd was a part of) (To celebrate the name of the company founded by Ewen W.Allison nearly 100 years before). However, the difficulties and hardships of rejuvenating a failing fleet became apparent almost immediately, as within six weeks of the takeover, every vessel was out of service, except for the Glen Rosa, a small Launch (boat).

The transition to a modern operation began in 1987 with the arrival of the Quickcat, Gulf Ferries' first catamaran, creating a faster, more efficient ferry service to Waiheke Island and other destinations. This was continued with the Kea (Built by WECO in Whangārei) being introduced in 1988 to operate the Auckland City to Devonport service. For the tourism services, two new catamaran ferries from World Heritage Cruises, Adventurer and Wanderer, were purchased in 2006 and 2007 for NZ$3 million and NZ$2 million respectively. These vessels will also assist on the company's main ferry routes during peak hours.

In 1988, South Pacific Travel Holdings Ltd became shareholders before the publicly listed Fullers Corporation Ltd went into receivership. Recognizing the value of the "Fullers" brand, the company amalgamated its operations and changed its name to Fullers Group Limited. Stagecoach New Zealand became the major shareholder of Fullers Group Limited but kept George Hudson as chairman until 2007 where his son, Douglas Hudson became the CEO until 2017 when Mike Horne took over the position. In 2009, Brian Souter acquired the company as well as another ferry company, 360 Discovery Limited. Both are now part of the InMotion Group.

In 2018 Fullers and 360 Discovery decided to merge brands to become a more cohesive and consumer-friendly ferry operator creating Fullers360.

== Services ==
Departure Announcement
The distinctive bilingual announcement played aboard Fullers360 vessels while departing from a wharf.

Fullers Group runs ferries from the Auckland Ferry Terminal in Quay Street, Downtown Auckland under the Fullers360 branding. Fullers360 operates to:

Auckland suburbs of:

- Devonport
- Beach Haven
- Half Moon Bay near the eastern suburb of Howick
- Hobsonville Point
- Gulf Harbour

Hauraki Gulf Island destinations of:

- Waiheke Island
- Rangitoto Island

Fullers360 previously operated services to:

- Bayswater
- Birkenhead
- Northcote
- Motutapu Island
- Rotoroa Island
- Coromandel Peninsula
- Great Barrier Island

Fullers Group owns and operates the Waiheke Bus Company providing public transportation on Waiheke Island.

Fullers360 also operates tourism packages and tours alongside ferry services at its island destinations.

== Vessels ==
Key:	Out of service	Sold or Scrapped

Name	Image	Shipyard	Launched	Capacity	Length	Class/type	Notes
Waitematā 2		(New Zealand) Q-West, Whanganui	2025 planned	300; 28 bikes	32m	IC19214	Hybrid-electric
Kermadec		(New Zealand) Vessev, Auckland	2024; 2 years ago	8; 0 bikes	8.9m	VS-9	Electric. Touted as “the world's first electric hydrofoil ferry”. However, it will not be used for commuter ferry services
Kororā		(New Zealand) Q-West, Whanganui	2016; 10 years ago	420; 20 bikes	34.9m	IC15128	
Tōrea		(New Zealand) Q-West, Whanganui	2017; 9 years ago	420; 20 bikes	34.9m	IC15128	
Te Maki		(New Zealand) Challenge Marine, Nelson	2017; 9 years ago	174; 10 bikes	23.9m	IC15062	
Discovery VII (D7)		(Australia) Aluminium Marine, Brisbane	2015; 11 years ago	134; 6 bikes	19m	IC14202	
Discovery VI (D6)		(Australia) Aluminium Marine, Brisbane	2015; 11 years ago	249; 6 bikes	24.96m	ICO13078	
Te Kōtuku		(New Zealand) Q-West, Whanganui	2014; 12 years ago	329; 20 bikes	34m		
Ika Kākahi		(Australia) Aluminium Boats, Brisbane	2011; 15 years ago	400; 20 bikes	37m	EnviroCat	Built as a crew-transfer vessel for Gladstone LNG, known as Capricornian Dancer before joining Fullers in 2019
Kekeno		(Australia) Aluminium Boats, Brisbane	2011; 15 years ago	400; 20 bikes	37m	EnviroCat	Built as a crew-transfer vessel for Gladstone LNG, known as Capricornian Surfer before joining Fullers in 2017
Takahē		(Australia) Aluminium Marine, Brisbane	2011; 15 years ago	194; 10 bikes	23.9m	IC11022	
Adventurer		(Australia) RDM, Tasmania	1996; 30 years ago	246; 12 bikes	29m		
Discovery III (D3)		(New Zealand) Robertson Boats, Warkworth	1996; 30 years ago	150; 6 bikes	18m		
Tiger Cat		(New Zealand)	1996; 30 years ago	140; 15 bikes	18m		
Harbour Cat		(New Zealand)	1995; 31 years ago	108; 15 bikes	20m		
Discovery II (D2)		(New Zealand) Robertson Boats, Warkworth	1995; 31 years ago	78; 4 bikes	15m		Withdrawn from service mid 2025 and sold to unknown late 2025-early 2026
Osprey		(New Zealand) homebuilt in Whangārei	1994; 32 years ago	152; 10 bikes	19.5m		Withdrawn from service in 2023. Not wheelchair accessible.
Discovery I (D1)		(New Zealand) Robertson Boats, Warkworth	1993; 33 years ago	151	20m		
Superflyte		(Australia) Wavemaster, Perth	1996; 30 years ago	650; 30 bikes	41m		Withdrawn from service in 2019, scrapped in 2023
Seaflyte		(Australia) Wavemaster, Perth	1994; 32 years ago	208; 20 bikes	21.48m		Renamed Milford Explorer, now operates in Milford Sound
Jet Raider		(Australia) Wavemaster, Perth	1990; 36 years ago	400	37m		Sold to Tonga in 2017 and renamed to MV Māui Was put up for sale again in 2024 and is awaiting buyer.
Kea		(New Zealand) WECO, Whangārei	1988; 38 years ago	450; 30 bikes	27.06m		Withdrawn from service in 2020, scrapped in 2023
Quickcat		(Australia) SBF Engineering, Perth	1986; 40 years ago	650; 30 bikes	33.38m		Auckland's first purpose built ferry for the Auckland to Waiheke Island service. Withdrawn from service in May/June 2025, Scrapped in October/November 2026

== See also ==
- Public transport in Auckland
