= Woody R. Clermont =

American judge

County Court Judge, Broward County
- Incumbent
- Assumed office January 7, 2025

Woody R. Clermont (born on June 2, 1970), is an American attorney and African-American judge in Broward County, Florida. Clermont made history becoming the first male Haitian-American judge in Broward. His election marked not only an achievement for the Caribbean community in Broward, but also Broward's commitment to diversity on the bench.

== Early life and education ==
Clermont is of Haitian descent, and was born in Brooklyn, New York City, New York. He is the first cousin of the Kangol Kid (Sean Shiller Fequiere), of the hip hop group UTFO, famous for the smash hit single, Roxanne, Roxanne. As a youth, Clermont participated in both the Cub Scouts and the Boy Scouts, having achieved the rank of First Class Scout. From 1978 to 1984, Clermont attended the private Catholic K-8 school which was associated with the Our Lady of Refuge Church, in Brooklyn, New York, graduating with numerous awards and recognitions. Clermont served as an Altar Boy with the Our Lady of Refuge Church during this time, and received a recognition for his service through the local chapter of the Knights of Columbus.

=== High School education ===
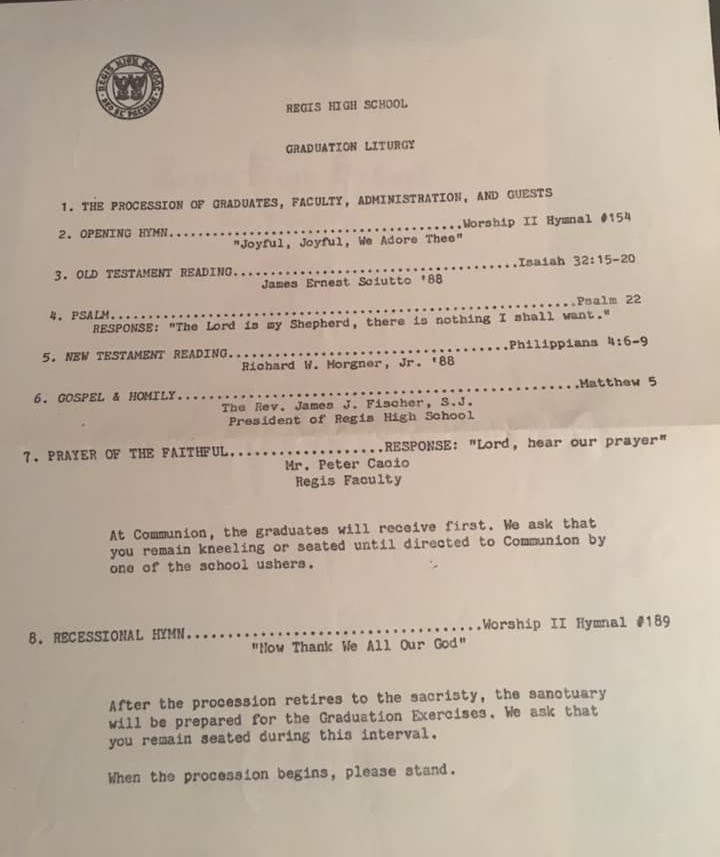
Listing of June 1988, Regis High School Graduation, where Clermont's classmate current Chief CNN National Security Correspondent for Jim Sciutto delivered an Old Testament Reading of Isaiah 32:15-20.

In 1984, Clermont passed the entrance exam and two rounds of interviews to be admitted to Regis High School, a private, all-male, Jesuit, secondary school for Roman Catholic boys located on the Upper East Side of Manhattan in New York City.

=== Undergraduate and graduate education ===
Clermont possesses a total of ten academic degrees: two associates degrees, three bachelors degrees, four masters degrees and a professional doctorate in law. Clermont is a member of the Phi Theta Kappa honor society, the Delta Epsilon Iota academic honor society, and the Omicron Delta Epsilon economics honor society. Clermont attended Binghamton University, receiving a Bachelor of Arts in political science in 1992. Clermont received his bachelor of science in mathematics from Mayville State University, two master's degrees from Florida Atlantic University, and his Juris Doctor from the University of Miami School of Law. Clermont won his first-year moot court competition with his partner Gerald Chen-Young in law school. Clermont also is a member of the Omega Nu Lambda Honors Society.

Clermont has earned the following academic degrees:

- Associate in Science, University of the People, Computer Science
- Associate in Science, Empire State University (SUNY), Science, Math, and Technology with a concentration in Information Systems
- Bachelor of Science, Western Governors University, in Business, Information Technology Management
- Bachelor of Science, Mayville State University, Mathematics
- Bachelor of Arts, Binghamton University (SUNY), Political Science
- Master of Science in Economics, Florida Atlantic University
- Master of Science in Data Analytics, Western Governors University
- Master of Business Administration, Florida Atlantic University
- Master of Arts in Theological Studies, Liberty University
- Juris Doctor, University of Miami School of Law.

In June 2026, Clermont announced that he is working towards an eleventh degree at City Vision University.

== Legal career ==
=== Life as an author, legal writing and publishing ===
Clermont was published twice in the Florida Bar Journal. Clermont additionally wrote an article about Medicare and the Office of Medicare Hearings and Appeals (OMHA) in the Pittsburgh Journal of Environmental and Public Health Law, and an article about the economics of the death penalty and the lethal injection protocol in the St. Thomas Law Review. Clermont has published more than 35 books. Clermont also published an article about federal restitution in the Nova Law Review as well. In 2011, Clermont wrote a legal journal article in the Freedom Center Journal at the University of Cincinnati School of Law, calling on Americans to seek changes to the Thirteenth Amendment, arguing that the punishment clause currently allows for slavery as conviction of a crime which resulted in convict leasing, stereotypes about alleged black criminality, a prison industrial complex, and chain gangs. Filmmaker Ana DuVernay released a film about this subject, five years later, with her Emmy Award winning documentary 13th.

=== Interview on Miami Boss Podcast ===
In an interview of the Miami Boss Podcast, Clermont discussed the case of a group of young Hispanic adults who broke into the home of then Miami Heat player Ray Allen in 2014, and how the police refused to arrest the teens originally or charge them with a crime. The Allens maintained their home was locked and that the act constituted a home invasion because Allen's wife and children were alarmed by their presence as they fled when Shannon Allen screamed. The police characterized the entry as curious teens entering through an unlocked door believing the home was unoccupied, and that committed no criminal wrongdoing. "The suggestion that anyone can unlawfully enter into someone's locked home and then into an occupied bedroom in the middle of the night without consequences is unsettling," Allen's statement said. "Regardless of the stated or actual reason for such unlawful entry... everyone deserves to feel safe in their own homes." Receiving no help from the police, the Allens had to go directly to the State Attorney's Office to give statements and have the prosecutors file the charges directly without police involvement; the prosecution did not file burglary, but rather several counts of misdemeanor trespass. The teens had their cases dropped after a pretrial diversion program involved community service and a fine.

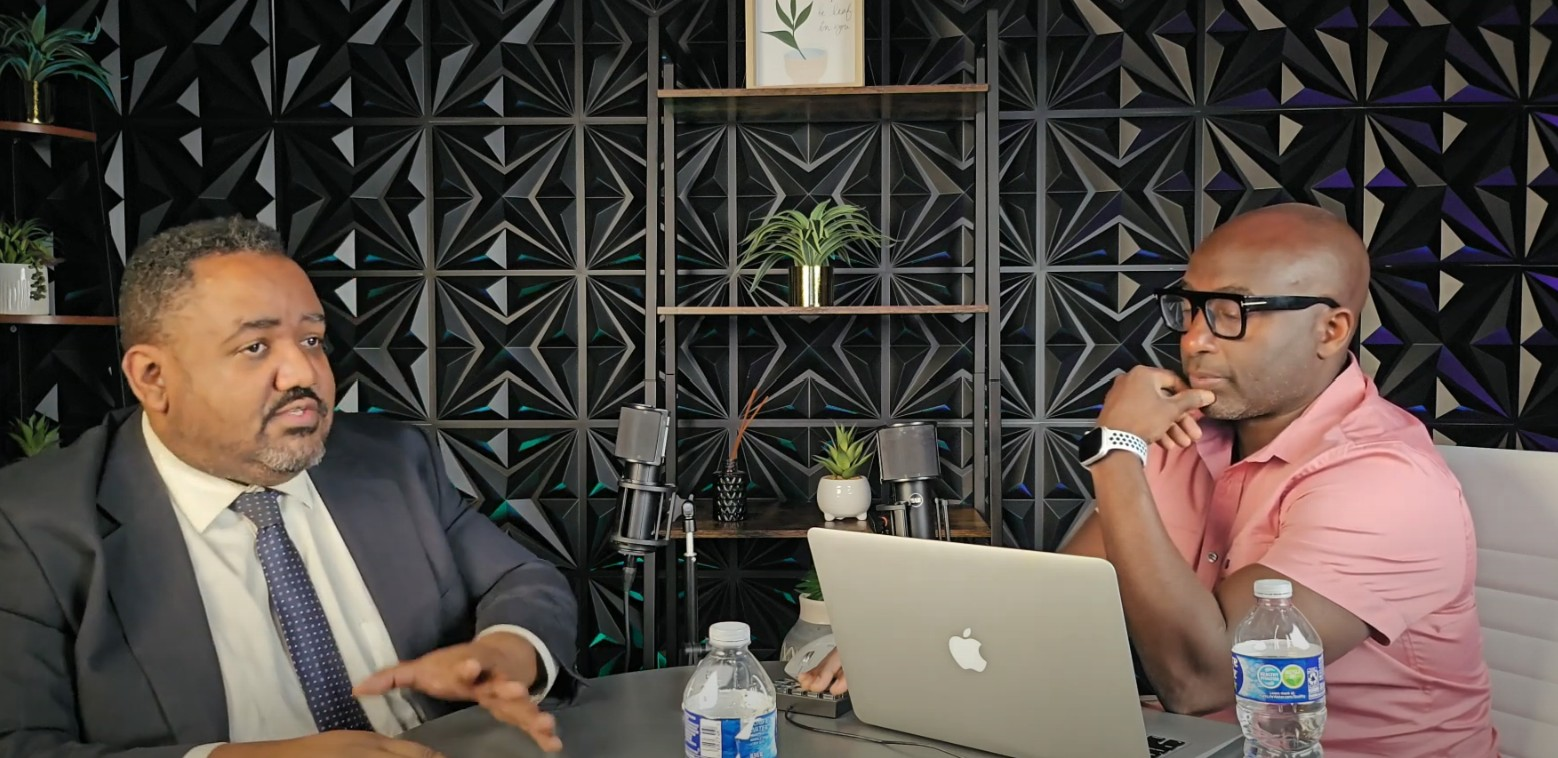
Dominique Louis interviewing Woody Clermont.

=== Service on the Rules of Judicial Administration Committee of the Florida Bar ===
During 2015–2018, Clermont served on the Florida Rules of Judicial Administration Committee] (RJA), which has now been renamed the Florida Rules of General Practice and Judicial Administration Committee. Clermont served as the Vice Chair of Subcommittee C, under Chair Ed Sanchez (currently Federal Magistrate Judge Sanchez), during this time.

== Political career ==
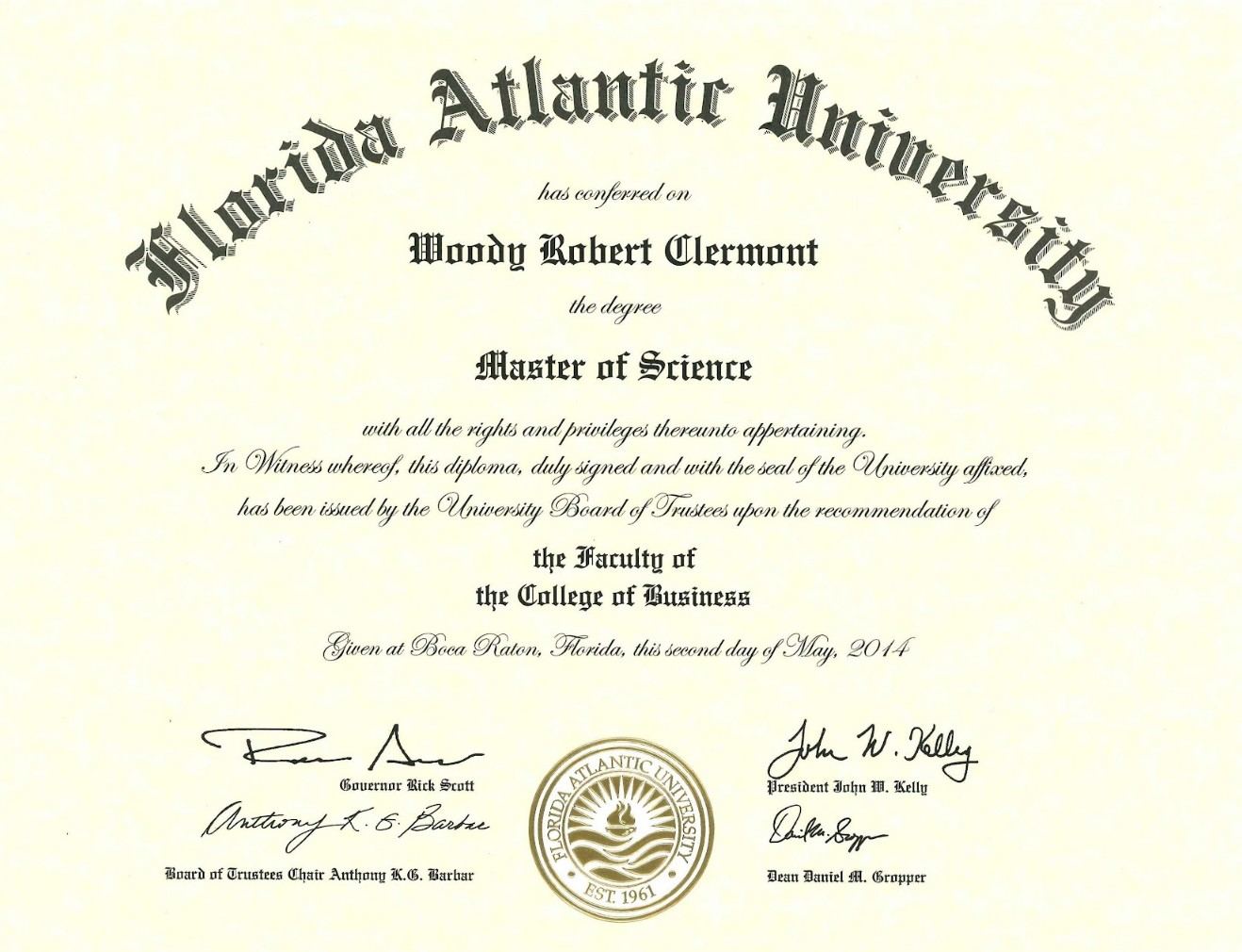
Clermont's Master of Science, in Economics, from Florida Atlantic University.

Clermont served as a Commission Aide to the Miami Dade County Board of County Commissioners, between 2020 and 2021. Clermont worked in the employment of current Democratic Vice Chairman Kionne McGhee, in District 9. McGhee had previously served as the House Minority Leader, in the Florida House between 2018 and 2020.

=== Legal and hearing officer experience ===
Judge Woody Clermont sitting in Chambers.

Clermont served as an Assistant State Attorney in the Miami-Dade County State Attorney's Office under Katherine Fernandez-Rundle, starting in 2005 and working with the office for nearly 5 years. Clermont served as Assistant Chief of DUI and Traffic Prosecution, and prosecuted misdemeanor cases with the then Assistant Public Defender Kash Patel, who would later go on to serve as Chief of Staff to Acting Secretary of Defense Christopher Miller. Patel currently serves as the Ninth (9th) Director of the Federal Bureau of Investigation (FBI). Clermont worked as an Assistant General Counsel and Senior Trial Court Staff Attorney for the Eleventh Judicial Circuit of Florida for nearly 11 years. During his time at the Eleventh Judicial Circuit, he assisted the then Judge Scott Silverman with legal research and writing on an order in the case of DDU Exp., Inc. v. ABC Distributing, LLC; both the former Judge Silverman and future Judge Clermont shared in common that both were members of Omicron Delta Epsilon economics Honor Society. Clermont served as an Assistant City Attorney under the City Attorney Rafael Paz for the City of Miami Beach between 2022 and 2024, leading its municipal prosecution team during this time. Clermont previously served as a Medicaid Fair Hearing Officer with the Agency for Healthcare Administration (AHCA).

=== Unsuccessful application to the Florida Supreme Court ===
Clermont had previously unsuccessfully sought appointment to the Florida Supreme Court in April 2023, competing among a pool of 15 candidates. Justice Meredith Sasso was appointed by Governor Ron DeSantis to the vacant seat on May 23, 2023.

== Judicial career ==
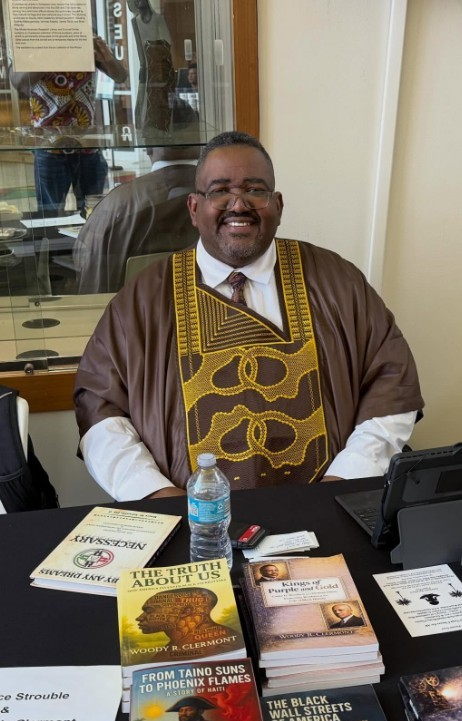
Woody R. Clermont

Clermont was the first Haitian-American male judge to be elected in Broward County. Florence Taylor Barner was the first Haitian-American judge to be elected in Broward County in 2016. Clermont was sworn in on January 7, 2025, by Chief Judge Jack Tuter and commenced his term. Judge Clermont is a County Court Judge assigned to handle Criminal division SB, and Civil Division 62. Judge Clermont's Investiture Ceremony took place on Friday, February 28, 2025.

=== 2024 judicial election ===
Clermont defeated Alejandro "Alex" Arreaza in the August 2024 primary election for Broward County Judge Group 10, then won the general election on November 5, 2024, in a runoff against Samuel Ford Stark.

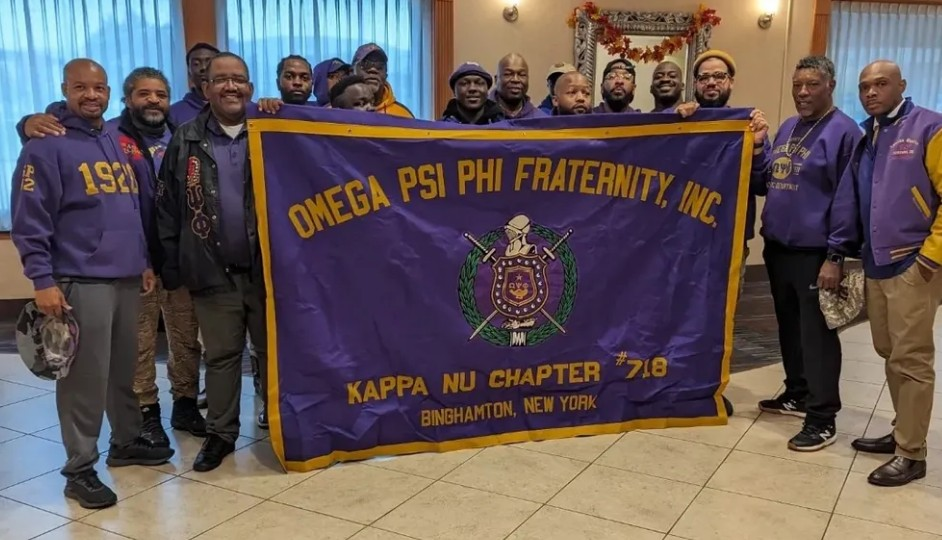
Woody Clermont serving as Basileus of the Kappa Nu chapter of Omega Psi Phi fraternity

== Organizational memberships ==
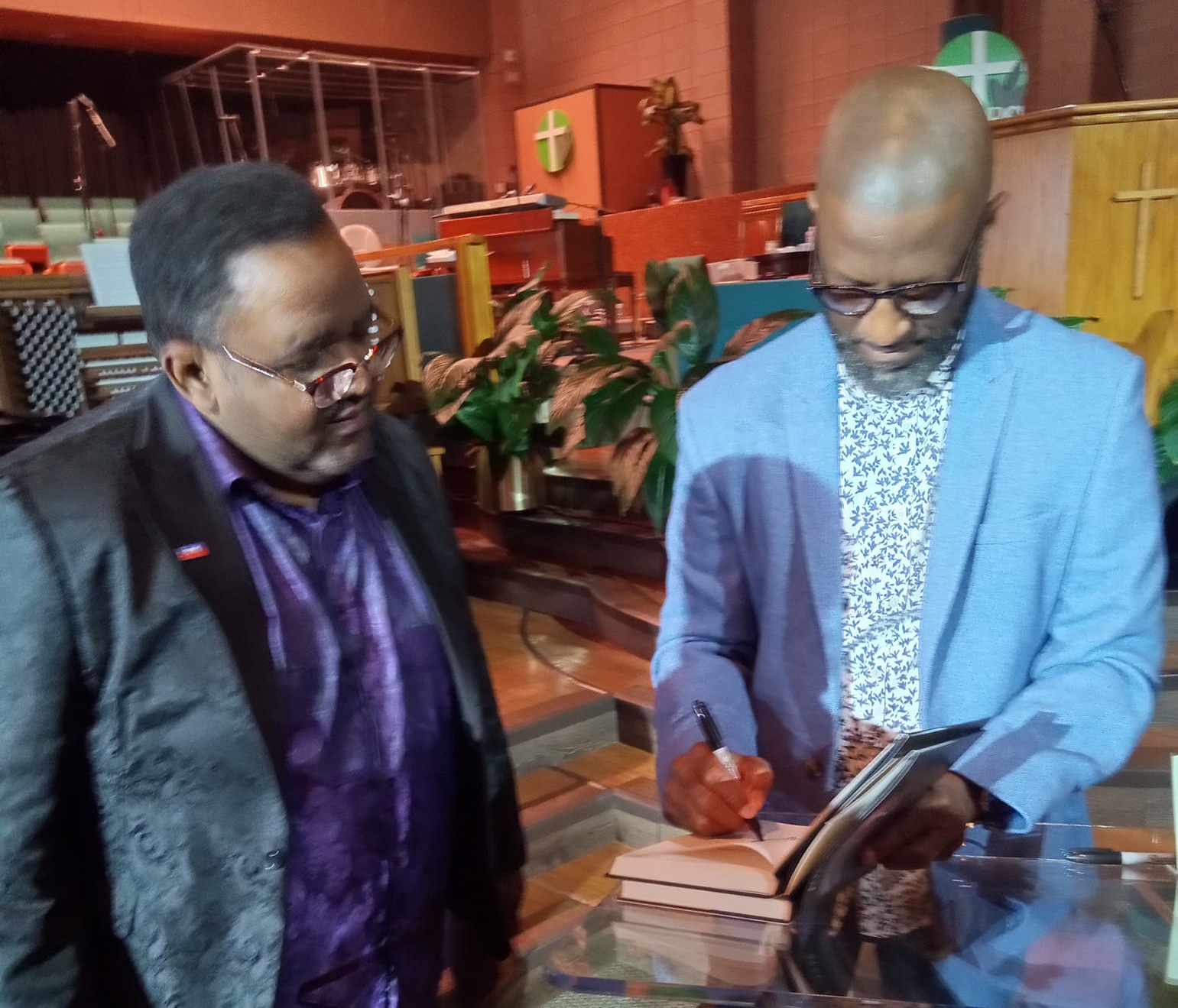
Clermont having a discussion with his Omega Psi Phi fraternity brother Rickey Smiley, while he autographs his book Sideshow: Living with Loss and Moving Forward with Faith. The meeting occurred when Smiley visited New Mount Olive Baptist Church.

Clermont is a silver life member of the NAACP, and pledged Kappa chapter of Omega Psi Phi fraternity at Syracuse University, in 1992 and is a lifetime member of the fraternity. Clermont served as Basileus of Kappa Nu chapter of Omega Psi Phi for 3 years. Clermont has been a member of Sigma Alpha chapter in Miami Gardens, Florida, and is a district life member of both the 2nd and the 7th District of Omega Psi Phi. Clermont also is involved in ministry work through his home church, the New Mount Olive Baptist Church. Clermont is also a member of the TJ Reddick Bar Association, and the Haitian Lawyers Association (HLA).

== Legal articles written ==
=== Legal Journal Articles ===
1. Your Lethal Injection Bill: A fight to the death over an expensive yellow jacket, 24 St. Thomas Law Rev. 248 (Spring 2012);
2. A Brief Introduction to Medicare and the Office of Medicare Hearings and Appeals, 5 Pitt. J. Envtl. Pub. Health L. 103 (Summer 2011);
3. It's Never Too Late To Make Amends: Two Wrongs Don't Protect a Victim's Right to Restitution, 35 Nova L. Rev. 363 (Spring 2011);
4. The Advent of Paper IMEs in No-fault Claims: Will They Be a Solution or a Problem? 85-OCT Fla. B.J. 11 (Sept./Oct. 2011);
5. Unshackling the Punishment Clause: A Call for the End of Convict Slavery, 3 Freedom Center J. 1 (Spring 2011);
6. Business Associations Reign Supreme: The Corporatist Underpinnings of Citizens United v. Federal Election Commission, 27 T.M. Cooley L. Rev. 477 (Michaelmas 2010);
7. You Can't Beat the Ride: The Increasing Rules of Evidence Inclusion, 10 Appalachian J.L. 65 (Winter 2010);
8. Order in the Courts: The Ongoing Challenge of Safeguarding Against Frivolity and Extortion, 84-OCT Fla. B.J. 66 (Sept./Oct. 2010).

== Books, literary awards, and recognition ==
Clermont has received literary awards and finalist distinctions for works of nonfiction and fiction. His books have been recognized by the Literary Titan Book Awards, The BookFest, the International Firebird Book Awards, the Florida Authors and Publishers Association, the NYC Big Book Award, the Next Generation Indie Book Awards, and other organizations.

In 2026, The Golden Mansaic Age was named a Distinguished Favorite in the Multicultural–Nonfiction category of the NYC Big Book Award and a finalist in the African American Nonfiction category of the Next Generation Indie Book Awards. Other 2026 honors included two third-place BookFest category awards for Kings of Purple and Gold, a FAPA Bronze Medal for Thirteen: The City of Thorns, and a category finalist designation from the Eric Hoffer Book Award for Foundations of Data Science and Statistics.

=== Selected literary awards and distinctions ===
| Year | Award organization | Work | Recognition |
|---|---|---|---|
| 2026 | The Independent Author Network | The Golden Mansaic Age | Finalist, Multicultural Non-Fiction |
| 2026 | The Independent Author Network | Reel Racism | Finalist, Historical Non-Fiction |
| 2026 | The American Book Fest | The Bible Is A Library | Finalist, Religion: Christianity |
| 2026 | The American Book Fest | A Lack of Medical Ethics | Finalist, History: General |
| 2026 | The BookFest | Dangerous, Black and Notorious | Third Place, Nonfiction - Biographies |
| 2026 | The BookFest | A Lack of Medical Ethics | Third Place, Nonfiction - History |
| 2026 | The BookFest | From Chains to Citizenhood | Second Place, Nonfiction - Society & Social Sciences - Race, Class, Culture & Religion |
| 2026 | Regal Summit Book Award | A Lack of Medical Ethics | Winner, History |
| 2026 | NYC Big Book Award | The Golden Mansaic Age | Distinguished Favorite, Multicultural–Nonfiction |
| 2026 | Regal Summit Book Award | The Negro from Nazareth | Winner, Non-Fiction |
| 2026 | Next Generation Indie Book Awards | The Golden Mansaic Age | Finalist, African American Nonfiction |
| 2026 | The BookFest | Kings of Purple and Gold | Third Place, Nonfiction–Biographies |
| 2026 | The BookFest | Kings of Purple and Gold | Third Place, Nonfiction–History |
| 2026 | Florida Authors and Publishers Association | Thirteen: The City of Thorns | Bronze Medal, Science Fiction/Fantasy |
| 2026 | International Firebird Book Awards | The Bible of Black Prosperity | Third Place, African American Nonfiction |
| 2026 | Eric Hoffer Book Award | Foundations of Data Science and Statistics | Category Finalist |
| 2026 | Storytrade Book Awards | I Have a Bomb Around My Neck | Finalist, True Crime |
| 2026 | Literary Titan | The Truth About Us | Book Award, Nonfiction |
| 2026 | Literary Titan | Black Is My Ethnicity | Gold Book Award, Nonfiction |
| 2026 | International Impact Book Awards | The Fractal Self | Distinguished Author, Laureate |
| 2025 | The BookFest | The Black Wall Streets of America | Second Place, Nonfiction–Business–Industries |
| 2025 | Literary Titan | Embracing Your Inner Villain | Book Award, Nonfiction |
| 2025 | Literary Titan | Sages of the Motherland | Book Award, Nonfiction |
| 2025 | Literary Titan | Transcendence | Silver Book Award |
| 2025 | International Firebird Book Awards | The Negro from Nazareth | Second Place, Nonfiction |
| 2025 | Literary Global Book Awards | You Are God's Beloved Children | Winner, Parenting & Family–Religion |
| 2025 | Literary Global Book Awards | The Sophian Way | Finalist, Parenting & Family–Spirituality |
| 2025 | Literary Moments Magazine/Black Authors Association | Reel Racism | Best History Book |

=== Critical reception ===
Clermont's From Taino Suns to Phoenix Flames: A Story of Haiti received a favorable review from Kirkus Reviews, which assigned the book its "Get It" verdict.

His works have also been reviewed by Literary Titan, Readers' Favorite, Reader Views, and BookLife. Reviewed titles include The Black Wall Streets of America, The Truth About Us, Reel Racism, The Bible Is a Library, The Bible of Black Prosperity, Thirteen: The City of Thorns, and The Storm of the Revenant. He was also named in the list of Summit Book Award Winners.

=== Books ===
- A Lack of Medical Ethics;
- All Spirits Rising: The Power of Unlimited Possibility;
- Baker's Dozen: Inherit Thirteen Traits of High-Income People;
- Dangerous, Black and Notorious: America's First Self Made Female Millionaire;
- Embracing Your Inner Villain: Becoming Unstoppable;
- Florida Ethics for the Bench: First Edition;
- Florida's Black Larger-Than-Life Giants in the Law: A First Installment;
- Foundations of Data Science and Statistics: Analytics Made Simple;
- From Chains to Citizenhood: The Legal Struggle for Black Citizenship;
- From Taino Suns to Phoenix Flames: A Story of Haiti;
- Kings of Purple and Gold: Carter G. Woodson and Herman Dreer, Fraternity Brothers at the Fore of Black History;
- Love and Vengeance: The Heart of Monte Cristo: Volume One: The Man from Château d’If;
- Love and Vengeance: The Heart of Monte Cristo: Volume Two: The Second Coming of Edmond Dantes;
- Love and Vengeance: The Heart of Monte Cristo: Volume Three: Marseilles on Fire;
- Reel Racism: Birth of a Divided Nation;
- Sages of the Motherland: The Great African Philosophers;
- Strategic Microeconomics;
- Structured Query Language: SQL Concepts and Comic Relief;
- The Antillean Confederation: Betances, Borinquen, and the Caribbean Unchained;
- The Bible of Black Prosperity: Reclaiming Lost Black Wealth;
- The Black Wall Streets of America: Towards a Black Stock Exchange;
- The Count of Monte Cristo: Volumes 4–5;
- The Fusion of Law and Economics;
- The Golden Mansaic Age: The Legendary Malian Empire;
- The Great Kushite Philosophers: The Wisdom of Nubia;
- The Metrics of Heaven;
- The Negro from Nazareth;
- The Nubian Code: Nubian Mathematics and the African Mind;
- The Spirit of Tzevaot: The Dark Chosen One;
- The Truth About Us;
- Transcendence: The Spiritual Power of the Mind;
- Trusts in 30 Days: A Practical Guide to Protecting Assets and Planning for the Future;
- You are God's Beloved Children: Surviving the Furnace of Affliction;
- You May Conquer.

== See also ==
- Perpetual student
