= Waukesha North High School =

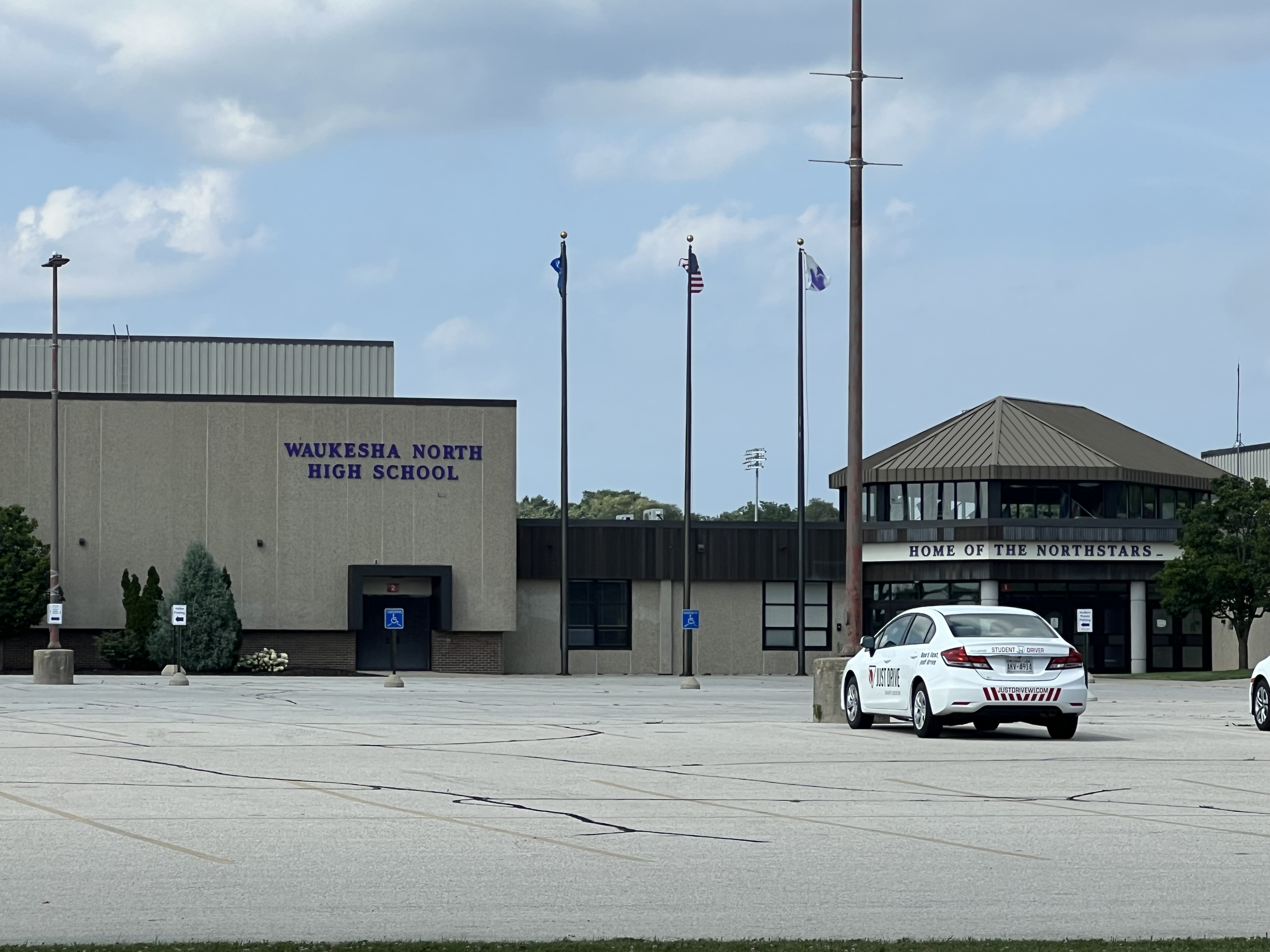

Location
- 2222 Michigan Avenue; Waukesha, Wisconsin; USA; 43°01′05.6″N 88°15′53.1″W

Information
- Type: Public high school
- Established: 1974
- School district: Waukesha School District
- Principal: Thomas Schalmo
- Assistant Principal: Brian Schlei, Chad Schraufnagel
- Teaching staff: 61.54 (FTE)
- Grades: 9–12
- Enrollment: 960 (2023–2024)
- Student to teacher ratio: 15.60
- Campus: Suburban
- Colors: Purple and white
- Mascot: Sparky the polar bear
- Nickname: Northstars
- Yearbook: Northern Lights
- Website: https://sdw.waukesha.k12.wi.us/o/northhs

Waukesha North High School is one of three high schools located in Waukesha, Wisconsin. Operated by the Waukesha School District, the school opened in mid-year, at the start of the second semester, during the 1974–1975 school year. The school is part of the Wisconsin Interscholastic Athletic Association and the Classic 8 Conference in athletics. North's nickname is the "Northstars" and the school mascot is the polar bear, "Sparky"

The school has a rotating schedule and advisory program. Its marching band won the WSMA state marching band championship every year from 2007 to 2015.

== Extracurricular activities ==
Waukesha North is a contributor to Invisible Children, Inc., and has raised money for schools in northern Uganda.

=== FIRST Robotics ===
Waukesha North participates in CORE 2062, a FIRST Robotics Competition team. The sixteen-year-old team won the Rookie All Star Award in 2007, the Wisconsin Regional (Milwaukee) in 2008, and the 10,000 Lakes Regional (Minneapolis) in 2010.

=== Music ===
The music program at Waukesha North High School includes band, choir, guitar, orchestra, and jazz ensemble. Each music area offers varied extra-curricular entities, ranging from musical theatre to pep band to solo ensemble experiences.

=== Drama ===
The drama program at Waukesha North does three shows per school year, two plays during the fall and spring season, and a musical during the winter. In 2022 the Northstar Drama Club put on a production of Chicago, and won three awards from the Jerry Awards. In 2023, the Northstar Drama Club put on a production of The Wedding Singer the musical and won three awards from the Jerry Awards.

=== Athletic conference affiliation history ===
- Suburban Conference (1974-1985)
- Braveland Conference (1985-1993)
- Southeast Conference (1993-1997)
- Classic 8 Conference (1997-2025)
- Woodland Conference (2025–present)

== Notable alumni ==
- Erik Bickerstaff (class of 1998), former NFL player
- Chimere Dike (class of 2020), NFL player for the Tennessee Titans, former college football wide receiver for the Wisconsin Badgers and Florida Gators
- Jeff Hanson (class of 1996), musician
- Kurt Larson (class of 1994), former NFL player
- Johnny Lechner, perpetual college student
- Will McDonald IV (class of 2018), NFL player for the New York Jets
- Edmund C. Moy (class of 1975), former director of the United States Mint
- Jon Richards, Wisconsin politician
- Nick Viall (class of 1999), former contestant on The Bachelorette and The Bachelor on Season 21 of the show
