= Toshihisa =

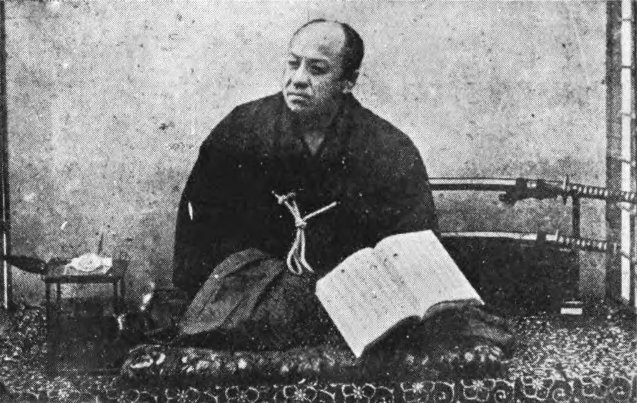
- Toshihisa Nanbu (1827–1896), Japanese daimyo.
- Pronunciation: toɕiçisa (IPA)
- Gender: Male

Origin
- Origin: Japanese
- Meaning: Different meanings depending on the kanji used

Other names
- Alternative spelling: Tosihisa (Kunrei-shiki) Tosihisa (Nihon-shiki) Toshihisa (Hepburn)

Toshihisa is a masculine Japanese given name.

== Written forms ==
Toshihisa can be written using different combinations of kanji characters. Some examples:

- 敏久, "agile, long time"
- 敏尚, "agile, still"
- 俊久, "talented, long time"
- 俊尚, "talented, still"
- 利久, "benefit, long time"
- 利尚, "benefit, still"
- 年久, "year, long time"
- 年尚, "year, still"
- 寿久, "long life, long time"
- 寿尚, "long life, still"
- 歳久, "age, long time"

The name can also be written in hiragana としひさ or katakana トシヒサ.

== Notable people with the name ==
- Toshihisa Kuzuhara (葛原 稔永, born 1980), Japanese motorcycle racer.
- Toshihisa Nagata (長田 利久, born 1945), Japanese bobsledder.
- Toshihisa Nanbu (南部 利剛, 1827–1896), Japanese daimyō.
- Toshihisa Nishi (仁志 敏久, born 1971), Japanese baseball player.
- Toshihisa Shimazu (島津 歳久, 1537–1592), Japanese samurai.
- Toshihisa Toyoda (豊田 利久, born 1940), Japanese economist.
- Toshihisa Tsuchihashi (土橋 登志久, born 1966), Japanese tennis player.
