= Secession =

Formal withdrawal of a group from a political entity

Secession (Note: From Latin: sēcessiō, lit. 'a withdrawing') is the unilateral withdrawal of an integral part of a state's territory. Secession generally aims to establish a separate political entity, typically a sovereign state, although it may instead seek accession to another existing state.

Secession often begins with an act such as a declaration of independence, and may be pursued peacefully or through armed conflict. Scholars distinguish secession from related concepts such as separatism. Theories of secession differ over its causes, moral justification, and legal status, including whether groups possess a general right of secession or only a remedial right in cases of serious injustice. International law generally neither recognizes a broad right of unilateral secession nor absolutely prohibits it, while the constitutional law of individual states varies considerably.

Secession has occurred throughout history through decolonization, the breakup of federations and multinational states, and regional independence movements. Historical and contemporary secessionist movements have sought independence or greater autonomy in many parts of the world. Threats of secession may be used to obtain greater autonomy or other political concessions short of independence.

== Secession theory ==
According to the 2017 book Secession and Security, by political scientist Ahsan Butt, states respond violently to secessionist movements if the potential state poses a greater threat than the would-be secessionist movement. States perceive a future war with a potential new state as likely if the ethnic group driving the secessionist struggle has deep identity division with the central state, and if the regional neighborhood is violent and unstable.

=== Explanations for the 20th century increase in secessionism ===
According to political scientist Bridget L. Coggins, the academic literature contains four potential explanations for the drastic increase in secessions during the 20th century:

- Ethnonational mobilization, where ethnic minorities have been increasingly mobilized to pursue states of their own.
- Institutional empowerment, where the growing inability of empires and ethnic federations to maintain colonies and member states increases the likelihood of success.
- Relative strength, where increasingly powerful secessionist movements are more likely to achieve statehood.
- Negotiated consent, where home states and the international community increasingly consent to secessionist demands.

Other scholars have linked secession to resource discoveries and extraction. David B. Carter, H. E. Goemans, and Ryan Griffiths find that border changes among states tend to conform to the borders of previous administrative units.

Several scholars argue that changes in the international system have made it easier for small states to survive and prosper. Tanisha Fazal and Ryan Griffiths link increased numbers of secessions to an international system that is more favorable for new states. For example, new states can obtain assistance from international organizations such as the International Monetary Fund, World Bank, and the United Nations. Alberto Alesina and Enrico Spolaore argue that greater levels of free trade and peace have reduced the benefits of being part of a larger state, thus motivating nations within larger states to seek secession.

Woodrow Wilson's proclamations on self-determination in 1918 created a surge in secessionist demands.

== Philosophy of secession ==
The political philosophy of the rights and moral justification for secession began to develop as recently as the 1980s. American philosopher Allen Buchanan offered the first systematic account of the subject in the 1990s and contributed to the normative classification of the literature on secession. In his 1991 book Secession: The Morality of Political Divorce From Fort Sumter to Lithuania and Quebec, Buchanan outlined limited rights to secession under certain circumstances, mostly related to oppression by people of other ethnic or racial groups, and especially those previously conquered by other people. In his collection of essays from secession scholars, Secession, State, and Liberty, professor David Gordon challenges Buchanan, making a case that the moral status of the seceding state is unrelated to the issue of secession itself.

=== Justifications for secession ===
Some theories of secession emphasize a general right of secession for any reason ("Choice Theory") while others emphasize that secession should be considered only to rectify grave injustices ("Just Cause Theory"). Some theories do both. A list of justifications may be presented supporting the right to secede, as described by Allen Buchanan, Robert McGee, Anthony Birch, Jane Jacobs, Frances Kendall and Leon Louw, Leopold Kohr, Kirkpatrick Sale, Donald W. Livingston and various authors in David Gordon's "Secession, State and Liberty", includes:

- United States President James Buchanan, Fourth Annual Message to Congress on the State of the Union December 3, 1860: "The fact is that our Union rests upon public opinion, and can never be cemented by the blood of its citizens shed in civil war. If it cannot live in the affections of the people, it must one day perish. Congress possesses many means of preserving it by conciliation, but the sword was not placed in their hand to preserve it by force."
- Former President Thomas Jefferson, in a letter to William H. Crawford, Secretary of War under President James Madison, on June 20, 1816: "In your letter to Fisk, you have fairly stated the alternatives between which we are to choose: 1, licentious commerce and gambling speculations for a few, with eternal war for the many; or, 2, restricted commerce, peace, and steady occupations for all. If any State in the Union will declare that it prefers separation with the first alternative, to a continuance in union without it, I have no hesitation in saying, 'let us separate.' I would rather the States should withdraw, which are for unlimited commerce and war, and confederate with those alone which are for peace and agriculture."
- Economic enfranchisement of an economically oppressed class that is regionally concentrated within the scope of a larger national territory.
- The right to liberty, freedom of association and private property
- Recognition of the will of the majority to secede, in keeping with consent as an important democratic principle
- Increased ease for states to join with others in an experimental union
- Dissolution of such a union when goals for which it was constituted are not achieved
- Self-defense when larger group presents lethal threat to minority or the government cannot adequately defend an area
- Self-determination of peoples
- Preservation of culture, language, etc. from assimilation or destruction by a larger or more powerful group
- Furtherance of diversity by allowing diverse cultures to keep their identity
- Rectification of past injustices, especially past conquest by a larger power
- Escape from "discriminatory redistribution", i.e. tax schemes, regulatory policies, economic programs, and similar policies that distribute resources away to another area, especially in an undemocratic fashion
- Enhanced efficiency when the state or empire becomes too large to administer efficiently
- Preservation of "liberal purity" (or "conservative purity") by allowing less (or more) liberal regions to secede
- Provision of superior constitutional systems which allow flexibility of secession
- Minimizing the size of political entities and the human scale through right to secession

Political scientist Aleksander Pavkovic describes five justifications for a general right of secession within liberal political theory:

- Anarcho-Capitalism: individual liberty to form political associations and private property rights together justify right to secede and to create a "viable political order" with like-minded individuals.
- Democratic Secessionism: the right of secession, as a variant of the right of self-determination, is vested in a "territorial community" which wishes to secede from "their existing political community"; the group wishing to secede then proceeds to delimit "its" territory by the majority.
- Communitarian Secessionism: any group with a particular "participation-enhancing" identity, concentrated in a particular territory, which desires to improve its members' political participation has a prima facie right to secede.
- Cultural Secessionism: any group which was previously in a minority has a right to protect and develop its own culture and distinct national identity through seceding into an independent state.
- The Secessionism of Threatened Cultures: if a minority culture is threatened within a state that has a majority culture, the minority needs a right to form a state of its own which would protect its culture.

=== Arguments against secession ===
Allen Buchanan, who supports secession under limited circumstances, lists arguments that might be used against secession:

- "Protecting legitimate expectations" of those who now occupy territory claimed by secessionists, even in cases where that land was stolen
- "Self defense" if losing part of the state would make it difficult to defend the rest of it
- "Protecting majority rule" and the principle that minorities must abide by them
- "Minimization of strategic bargaining" by making it difficult to secede, such as by imposing an exit tax
- "Soft paternalism" because secession will be bad for secessionists or others
- "Threat of anarchy" because smaller and smaller entities may choose to secede until there is chaos, although this is not the true meaning of the political and philosophical concept
- "Preventing wrongful taking" such as the state's previous investment in infrastructure
- "Distributive justice" arguments posit that wealthier areas cannot secede from poorer ones

== Types of secession ==
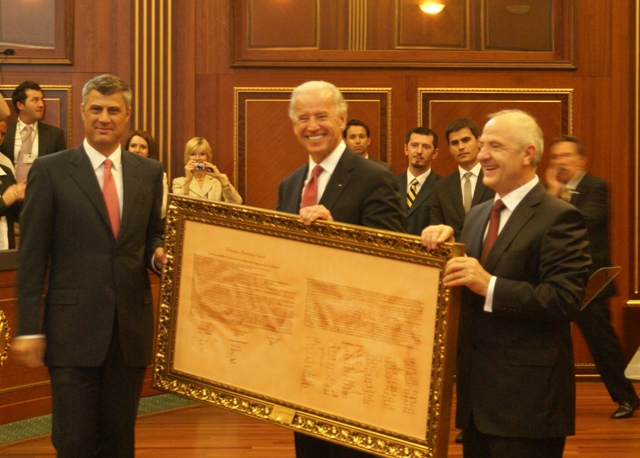
Hashim Thaçi (left) and then-US Vice President Joe Biden with the Declaration of Independence of Kosovo

Secession theorists have described a number of ways in which a political entity (city, county, canton, state, etc.) can secede from the larger or original state:

- Secession from federation or confederation (political entities with substantial reserved powers which have agreed to join) versus secession from a unitary state (a state governed as a single unit with few powers reserved to sub-units)
- Colonial wars of independence from an imperial state although this is decolonisation rather than secession.
- Recursive secession, such as India decolonising from the British Empire, then Pakistan seceding from India, or Georgia seceding from the Soviet Union, then South Ossetia seceding from Georgia.
- National secession (seceding entirely from the national state) versus local secession (seceding from one entity of the national state into another entity of the same state)
- Central or enclave secession (seceding entity is completely surrounded by the original state) versus peripheral secession (along a border of the original state)
- Secession by contiguous units versus secession by non-contiguous units (exclaves)
- Separation or partition (although an entity secedes, the rest of the state retains its structure) versus dissolution (all political entities dissolve their ties and create several new states)
- Irredentism where secession is sought in order to annex the territory to another state because of common ethnicity or prior historical links
- Minority secession (a minority of the population or territory secedes) versus majority secession (a majority of the population or territory secedes)
- Secession of better-off regions versus secession of worse-off regions
- The threat of secession is sometimes used as a strategy to gain greater autonomy within the original state

== Rights to secession ==
Most sovereign states do not recognize the right to self-determination through secession in their constitutions. Many expressly forbid it. However, there are several existing models of self-determination through greater autonomy and through secession.

In liberal constitutional democracies the principle of majority rule has dictated whether a minority can secede. In the United States Abraham Lincoln acknowledged that secession might be possible through amending the United States Constitution. The Supreme Court in Texas v. White held secession could occur "through revolution, or through consent of the States". The British Parliament in 1933 held that Western Australia could secede from the Commonwealth of Australia only upon vote of a majority of the country as a whole; the previous two-thirds majority vote for secession via referendum in Western Australia was insufficient.

The Chinese Communist Party followed the Soviet Union in including the right of secession in its 1931 constitution in order to entice ethnic nationalities and Tibet into joining. However, the Party eliminated the right to secession in later years, and had anti-secession clause written into the Constitution before and after the founding the People's Republic of China. The 1947 Constitution of the Union of Burma contained an express state right to secede from the union under a number of procedural conditions. It was eliminated in the 1974 constitution of the Socialist Republic of the Union of Burma (officially the "Union of Myanmar"). Burma still allows "local autonomy under central leadership".

As of 1996, the constitutions of Austria, Ethiopia, France, and Saint Kitts and Nevis have express or implied rights to secession. Switzerland allows for the secession from current and the creation of new cantons. In the case of proposed Quebec separation from Canada, the Supreme Court of Canada in 1998 ruled that only both a clear majority of the province and a constitutional amendment confirmed by all participants in the Canadian federation could allow secession.

The European Union is not a sovereign state but an association of sovereign states formed by treaty; as such, leaving it, which is possible by simply denouncing the treaty, is not secession. Nonetheless, the 2003 draft of the European Union Constitution allowed for the voluntary withdrawal of member states from the union, although the representatives of the member-state which wanted to leave could not participate in the withdrawal discussions of the European Council or of the Council of Ministers. There was much discussion about such self-determination by minorities before the final document underwent the unsuccessful ratification process in 2005. In 2007, Article 50 of the Treaty on European Union established a mechanism for withdrawal from the EU.

As a result of the successful constitutional referendum held in 2003, every municipality in the Principality of Liechtenstein has the right to secede from the Principality by a vote of a majority of the citizens residing in that municipality.

Indigenous peoples have a range of different forms of indigenous sovereignty and have the right of self-determination, but under current understanding of international law they have a mere "remedial" right to secession in extreme cases of abuse of their rights, because independence and sovereign statehood is a territorial and diplomatic claim and not one of self-determination and self-government, respectively, generally leaving rights to secession to the internal legislation of sovereign states.

== Secession movements ==
National secessionist movements advocate that a population has the right to form its own nation-state. Movements that work towards political secession may describe themselves as being autonomy, separatist, independence, self-determination, partition, devolution, decentralization, sovereignty, self-governance or decolonization movements instead of, or in addition to, being secession movements.

Notable examples of secession, and secession attempts, include:

- The United Provinces of the Netherlands breaking away from the Spanish Empire during the Eighty Years' War (1566–1648):
- The Thirteen Colonies (the later United States) revolting from the British Empire during the American Revolutionary War (1775–83);
- Hispanic America gaining independence from the Spanish Empire during Spanish American wars of independence;
- Texas leaving Mexico, during the Texas Revolution (1835–36);
- the Confederate States of America seceding from the Union, setting off the American Civil War;
- Panama seceding from Colombia in 1903, during United States acquisition of the Panama Canal;
- the Irish Republic leaving the United Kingdom;
- Finland voting to leave Soviet Russia in 1917, setting off the Finnish Civil War;
- Biafra leaving Nigeria (and returning, after losing the Nigerian Civil War);
- the former Soviet republics leaving the Soviet Union in 1991, causing its dissolution;
- the former republics leaving Yugoslavia during the 1990s, causing its dissolution.

=== Australia ===
During the 19th century, the single British colony in eastern mainland Australia, New South Wales (NSW) was progressively divided up by the British government as new settlements were formed and spread. Victoria (Vic) was formed in 1851 and Queensland (Qld) in 1859.

However, settlers agitated to divide the colonies throughout the later part of the century; particularly in central Queensland (centered in Rockhampton) in the 1860s and 1890s, and in North Queensland (with Bowen as a potential colonial capital) in the 1870s. Other secession (or territorial separation) movements arose and these advocated the secession of New England in northern central New South Wales, Deniliquin in the Riverina district also in NSW, and Mount Gambier in the eastern part of South Australia.

Western Australia

Secession movements have surfaced several times in Western Australia (WA), where a 1933 referendum for secession from the Federation of Australia passed with a two-thirds majority. The referendum had to be ratified by the British Parliament, which declined to act, on the grounds that it would contravene the Australian Constitution.

The Principality of Hutt River claimed to have seceded from Australia in 1970, although its status was not recognised by Australia or any other country.

=== Azerbaijan ===
The Karabakh movement, also known as the Artsakh movement was a national liberation movement in Armenia and Nagorno-Karabakh between 1988 and 1991 that advocated for the reunification ("miatsum") of the Nagorno-Karabakh – formally an autonomous enclave in Soviet Azerbaijan – with Soviet Armenia. The movement was motivated by fears of cultural and physical erasure under government policies from Azerbaijan. Throughout the Soviet period, Azerbaijani authorities implemented policies aimed at suppressing Armenian culture and diluting the Armenian majority in Nagorno-Karabakh through various means, including border manipulations, encouraging the exodus of Armenians, and settling Azerbaijanis in the region. In the 1960s, 1970s, and 1980s, Armenians protested against Azerbaijan's cultural and economic marginalization A referendum in 1988 was held to transfer the region to Soviet Armenia, citing self-determination laws in the Soviet constitution. (Note: According to the Constitution of the USSR, if a union republic voted to leave the Soviet Union, its autonomous republics, autonomous oblasts, and autonomous okrugs had the right to hold their own referendums to independently decide whether to remain in the USSR or to leave alongside the seceding union republic. They also had the right to raise questions regarding their own state-legal status.) In 1991, both Armenia and Nagorno-Karabakh declared independence from the Soviet Union. The Karabakh movement was met with a series of pogroms against Armenians across Azerbaijan, and in November 1991, the Azerbaijani government passed a motion aimed at abolishing the autonomy of the NKAO and prohibiting the use of Armenian placenames in the region.

=== Austria ===
After being liberated by the Red Army and the U.S. Army, Austria seceded from Nazi Germany on April 27, 1945. This took place after seven years under Nazi rule, which began with the annexation of Austria into Nazi Germany in March 1938. The secession only took place once Nazi Germany had been defeated by the Allies.

=== Bangladesh ===
The Banga Sena (Bangabhumi) is a separatist Hindu organisation, which supports the making of a Bangabhumi/separate homeland for Bengali Hindus in the People's Republic of Bangladesh. The group is led by Kalidas Baidya.

The Shanti Bahini (Bengali: শান্তি বাহিনী, "Peace Force") is the name of the military wing of the Parbatya Chattagram Jana Sanghati Samiti - the United People's Party of the Chittagong Hill Tracts aims are to create an indigenous Buddhist orientated Chacomas state within SE Bangladesh.

=== Belgium and the Netherlands ===
On August 25, 1830, during the reign of William I, the nationalistic opera La muette de Portici was performed in Brussels. Soon after, the Belgian Revolt occurred, which resulted in the Belgian secession from the Kingdom of the Netherlands.

=== Brazil ===
In 1825, soon after the Empire of Brazil managed to defeat the Cortes-Gerais and the Portuguese Empire in an Independence War, the Platinean nationalists in Cisplatina declared independence and joined the United Provinces, which led to a stagnated war between both, as they were both weakened, lacking manpower and politically fragile. The peace treaty accepted Uruguay's independence, reasserted the rule of both nations over their land and some important points like free navigation in the Silver River.

Three rather disorganized secessionist rebellions happened in Grão-Pará, Bahia, and Maranhão, where the people were unhappy with the Empire (these provinces were Portuguese bastions in the Independence War). The Malê Revolt, in Bahia, was an Islamic slave revolt. These three rebellions were bloodily crushed by the Empire of Brazil.

The Pernambuco was one of the most nativist of all Brazilian regions. Over a series of five revolts (1645–1654, 1710, 1817, 1824, 1848), the province ousted the Dutch West India Company and tried to secede from the Portuguese and Brazilian Empires. In each attempt, the rebels were crushed, the leaders shot and their territory divided. Nevertheless, they kept revolting until Pernambuco's territory was a little fraction of what it was before.

In the Ragamuffin War, the Province of Rio Grande do Sul was undergoing a (at that time common) liberal vs conservative "cold" war. After Emperor Pedro II of Brazil favoured the conservatives, the liberals took the Capital and declared an independent Republic, fighting their way to the Province of Santa Catarina and declaring the Juliana Republic. Eventually they were slowly forced back, and made a reunification peace with the Empire. This was not considered a secessionist war, even if it could have resulted in an independent republic if the Empire had been defeated. After the Empire agreed to aid Santa Catarina's economy by taxing Argentina's products (like dry meat), the rebels reunited with the Empire and joined its military ranks.

In modern times, the South Region of Brazil has been the centre of a secessionist movement led by an organization called The South is My Country since the 1990s. Reasons cited for Southern Brazil's secession movement are taxation, due to it being one of the wealthiest regions in the country; political disputes with the northernmost states of Brazil; 2016 scandal revolving around the Workers' Party's involvement in a kickback scheme with state-owned oil company Petrobras; and the impeachment of then-President Dilma Rousseff. Additionally, there is an ethnic divide as the South Region is predominately European, populated primarily by Germans, Italians, Portuguese and other European groups. In contrast, the rest of Brazil is a multicultural melting pot. The South Region in 2016 voted in an unofficial referendum called "Plebisul" in which 95% of voters supported secession and the creation of an independent South Region.

There is also a push for secession movement in the state of São Paulo, which seeks to become a country independent from the rest of Brazil.

=== Cameroon ===
In October 2017, Ambazonia declared its independence from Cameroon. Less than a month beforehand, tensions had escalated into open warfare between separatists and the Cameroon Armed Forces. The conflict, known as the "Anglophone Crisis", is deeply rooted in the October 1, 1961 incomplete decolonization of the former British Southern Cameroons (UNGA Resolution 1608). On January 1, 1960, French Cameroon was granted independence from France as the Republic of Cameroon and was admitted into the United Nations. The more advanced democratic and self-ruling people of British Cameroon were instead limited to two choices. Through a UN plebiscite, they were directed to either join the federation of Nigeria or the independent Republic of Cameroon as a federation of two equal states. While the Northern Cameroons voted to join Nigeria, the Southern Cameroons voted to integrate into the Republic of Cameroon, but they did so without a formal Treaty of Union on record at the UN. In 1972, Cameroon used its majority population to abolish the federation and implement a system which resulted in the occupation of the former South Cameroons territory by French-speaking Cameroon administrators. In 1984, Cameroon heightened tensions by returning to its name at independence, "Republic of Cameroun", which did not include the territory of the former British Southern Cameroons or Ambazonia. For more than fifty years the English-speaking people of the Former British Southern Cameroons made multiple attempts both nationally and internationally to get the Cameroon government to address these issues and possibly return to the previously agreed federation at independence. In 2016, after all these attempts failed, Cameroon engaged in a military crackdown, including cutting the internet in the English-speaking regions. In response, the people of Southern Cameroon declared on October 1, 2017, the restoration of their UN state of Southern Cameroons, which they called the "Federal Republic of Ambazonia".

=== Canada ===
Throughout Canada's history, there has been tension between English-speaking and French-speaking Canadians. Under the Constitutional Act of 1791, the Province of Quebec (including parts of what are today Quebec, Ontario and Newfoundland and Labrador) was divided in two: Lower Canada (which retained French law and institutions and is now part of the provinces of Quebec and Newfoundland and Labrador) and Upper Canada (a new colony intended to accommodate the many new English-speaking settlers, including the United Empire Loyalists, and now part of Ontario). The intent was to provide each group with its own colony. In 1841, the two Canadas were merged into the Province of Canada. The union proved contentious, however, resulting in a legislative deadlock between English and French legislators. The difficulties of the union, among other factors, led in 1867 to the formation of the Canadian Confederation, a federal system that united the Province of Canada, Nova Scotia and New Brunswick (later joined by other British colonies in North America). The federal framework did not eliminate all tensions, however, leading to the Quebec sovereignty movement in the latter half of the 20th century.

Other occasional secessionist movements have included anti-Confederation movements in the 19th century Atlantic Canada (see Anti-Confederation Party), the North-West Rebellion of 1885, and various small separatist movements in Alberta particularly (see Alberta separatism) and Western Canada generally (see, for example, Western Canada Concept).

=== Central America ===
After the 1823 collapse of the First Mexican Empire, the former Captaincy-General of Guatemala was organized into a new Federal Republic of Central America. In 1838, Nicaragua seceded. The Federal Republic was formally dissolved in 1840, all but one of the states having seceded amidst general disorder.

=== China ===
The People's Republic of China government claims control over Taiwan and describes the political status of Taiwan as an issue of secession, despite having never governed the territory. The Republic of China (Taiwan) government administers control over Taiwan and outlying islands but lacks widespread official international recognition. The Anti-Secession Law, passed in 2005, formalized the long-standing policy of the People's Republic of China to use military means against Taiwan independence in the event peaceful means become otherwise impossible.

Western regions of Xinjiang (East Turkistan) and Tibet are the focus of secessionist calls by the Tibetan independence movement and East Turkestan Independence Movement. The East Turkistan Government in Exile does not view East Turkistan as a part of China but rather an occupied country, so it does not view independence from China as "secession" but rather "decolonization".

The Special Administrative Region of Hong Kong has a secessionist movement in the city that the Chinese Communist Party has placed on the national security agenda in 2017 which is called the Hong Kong independence movement.

=== Congo ===
In 1960, the State of Katanga declared independence from the Democratic Republic of the Congo. United Nations troops crushed it in Operation Grand Slam.

=== Cyprus ===
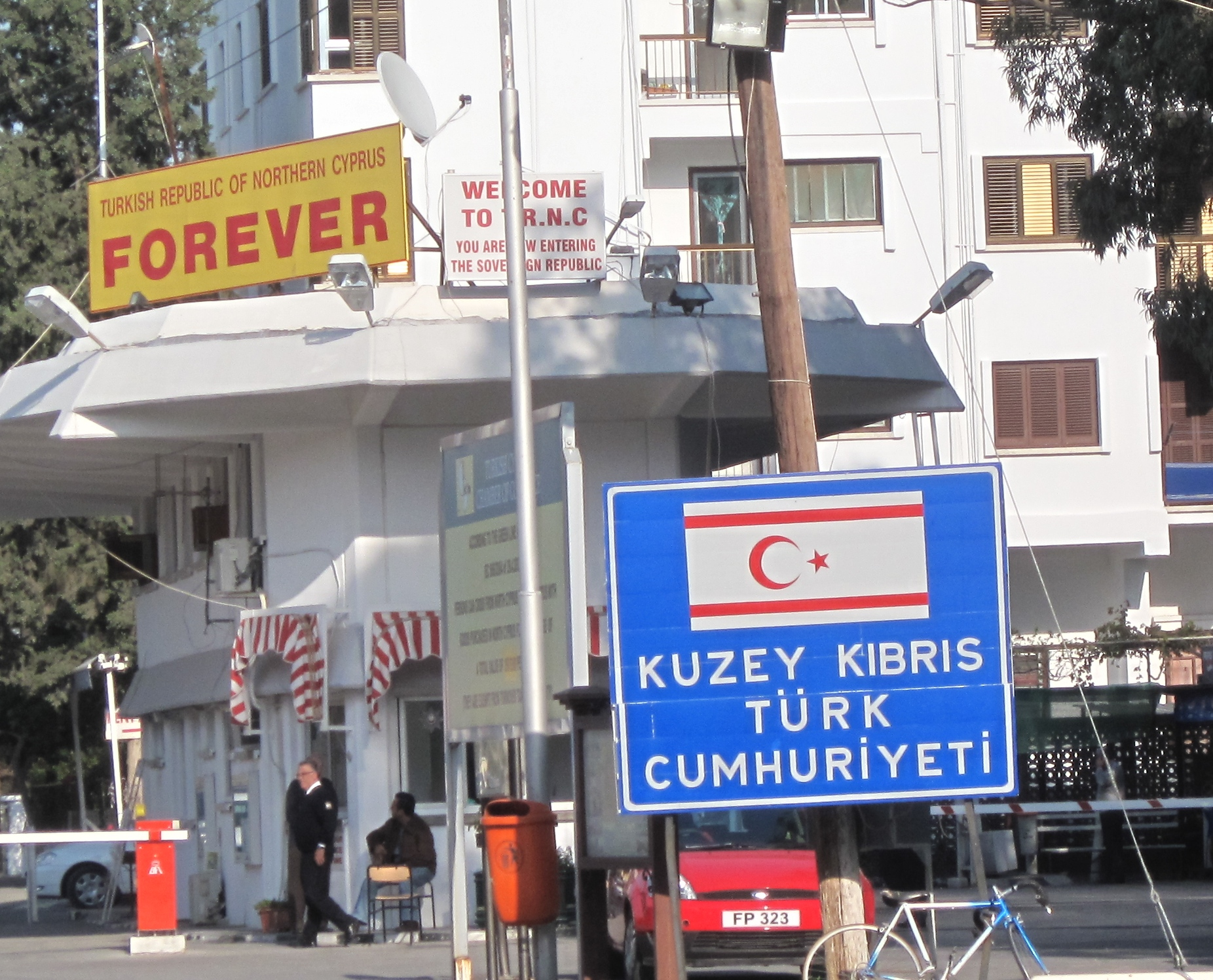
Northern Cyprus

In 1974, Greek irredentists launched a coup d'état in Cyprus, in an attempt to annex the island with Greece. Almost immediately, the Turkish Army invaded northern Cyprus to protect the interests of the ethnic Turkish minority, who in the following year formed the Turkish Federated State of Cyprus and in 1983 declared independence as the Turkish Republic of Northern Cyprus, recognized only by Turkey.

=== East Timor ===
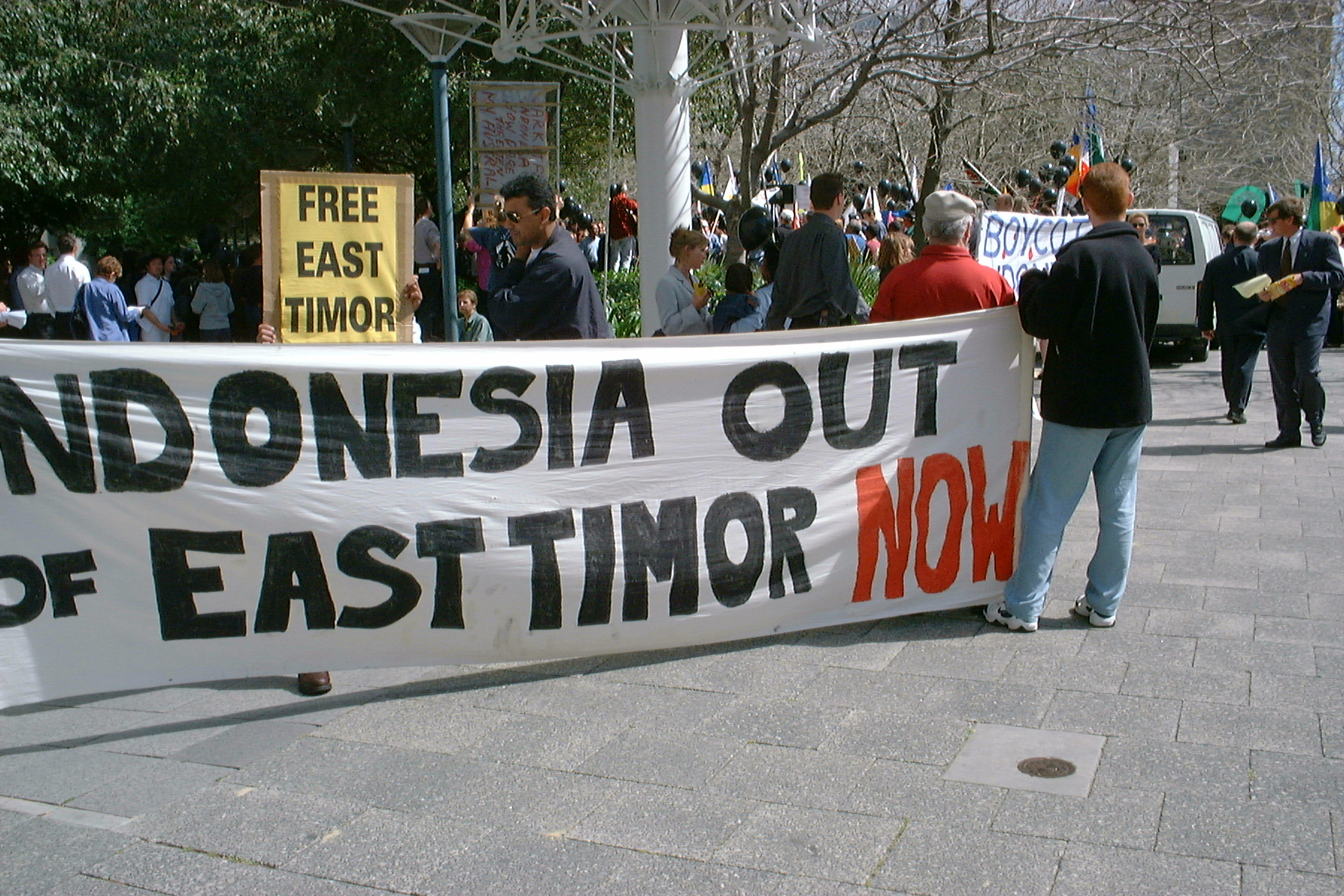
September 1999 demonstration for independence from Indonesia

The Democratic Republic of Timor-Leste (also known as East Timor) has been described as having "seceded" from Indonesia. After Portuguese sovereignty was terminated in 1975, East Timor was occupied by Indonesia. However, the United Nations and the International Court of Justice refused to recognize this incorporation. Therefore, the resulting civil war and eventual 1999 East Timorese vote for complete separation are better described as an independence movement.

=== Ethiopia ===
Following the May 1991 victory of Eritrean People's Liberation Front forces against the communist Derg regime during the Eritrean War of Independence, Eritrea (formerly known as "Medri Bahri") gained de facto independence from Ethiopia. Following the United Nations observation 1993 Eritrean independence referendum, Eritrea gained de jure independence.

=== European Union ===
Before the Treaty of Lisbon entered into force on 1 December 2009, no provision in the treaties or law of the European Union outlined the ability of a state to voluntarily withdraw from the EU. The European Constitution did propose such a provision and, after the failure to ratify the Treaty establishing a Constitution for Europe, that provision was then included in the Lisbon Treaty.

The treaty introduced an exit clause for members who wish to withdraw from the Union. This formalised the procedure by stating that a member state may notify the European Council that it wishes to withdraw, upon which withdrawal negotiations begin; if no other agreement is reached, the treaty ceases to apply to the withdrawing state two years after such notification.

On June 23, 2016, the United Kingdom voted to leave the European Union in a binding referendum voted for by parliament, and finally left the European Union on January 31, 2020. This is informally known as Brexit.

=== Finland ===
Finland successfully and peacefully seceded from the newly-formed and unstable Russian Soviet Federative Socialist Republic in 1917. The latter was led by Lenin, who had sought refuge in Finland during the Russian Revolution. Unsuccessful attempts at greater autonomy or peaceful secession had already been made during the preceding Russian Empire but had been denied by the Russian emperor. However, with the country still at war and under great pressure, Lenin allowed Finland to secede. Its peripheral location made it difficult to defend and less strategically important than Russia's other territories, so he conceded sovereignty to the Finns rather than try to defend it.

=== France ===
France was one of the European Great Powers with populous foreign empires. Like the others – the United Kingdom, Spain, Portugal, Italy, Belgium, the Netherlands, and formerly Germany and the Ottoman Empire – its populous states abroad have all seceded, in most cases been granted independence. These secessionist movements generally took place at similar stages by continent. See decolonization of the Ottoman Empire, Americas, Asia and Africa. As to France's contiguous state, these have few present representatives at the national level, see:

- Alsace independence movement
- Breton independence
- Corsican nationalism
- Occitan nationalism

=== Gran Colombia ===
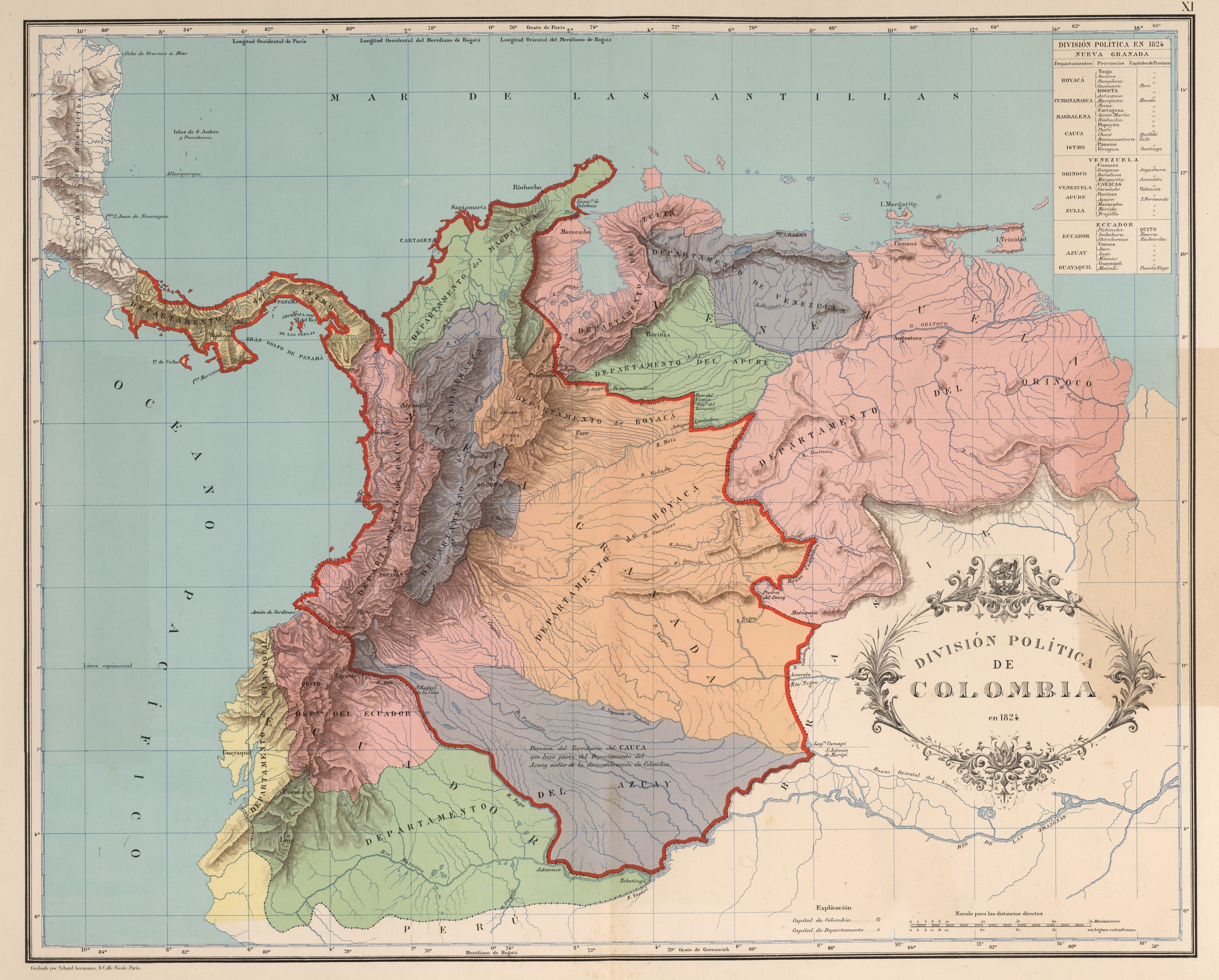
Map showing the shrinking territory of Gran Colombia from 1824 to 1890 (red line). Panama separated from Colombia in 1903.

After a decade of tumultuous federalism, Ecuador and Venezuela seceded from Gran Colombia in 1830, leaving the similarly tumultuous United States of Colombia (now the Republic of Colombia), which also lost Panama in 1903.

=== India ===
Pakistan seceded from the British-Indian Empire in what is known as the Partition. Today, the Constitution of India does not allow Indian states to secede from the Union.

The Indian Union Territory of Jammu and Kashmir hosts some paramilitary nationalists who advocate for a Muslim state, in opposition to the Indian establishment. They are mostly in the Valley of Kashmir since 1989, where the Indian Army sometimes patrols, having bases along the nearby international border. They are supported by Pakistan, which has allegedly funded many terrorist, separatist outfits with the goal of destabilizing India, according to the Indian Research and Analysis Wing, though the country denies any direct involvement. The Kashmir insurgency reached at its peak influence in the 1990s.

Other secessionist movements in Nagaland, Assam, Manipur, Punjab (known as the Khalistan movement), Mizoram and Tripura, Tamil Nadu . The violent Naxalite–Maoist insurgency operates in eastern rural India is rarely considered secessionist as its goal is to overthrow the government of India. The Communist Party of India (Maoist)'s commanders idealise a Communist republic to be made up swathes of India.

=== Iran ===
Active secession movements include: Iranian Azeri, Assyrian independence movement, Bakhtiary lurs movement in 1876, Iranian Kurdistan; Kurdistan Democratic Party of Iran (KDPI), Khūzestān Province Balochistan and independence movement for free separated Balochistan, (Arab nationalist); Al-Ahwaz Arab People's Democratic Popular Front, Democratic Solidarity Party of Al-Ahwaz (See Politics of Khūzestān Province: Arab politics and separatism), and Balochistan People's Party (BPP) supporting Baloch Separatism.

=== Italy ===
The Movement for the Independence of Sicily (Movimento Indipendentista Siciliano, MIS) has its roots in the Sicilian Independence Movement of the late 1940s; it was active for around 60 years. Today, the MIS no longer exists, though many other parties have emerged. One is Nation Sicily (Sicilia Nazione), which still believes in the idea that Sicily, due to its deeply personal and ancient history, should be a sovereign country. Moreover, a common ideology shared by all the Sicilian independentist movements is to fight against Cosa Nostra and all the other Mafia organizations, which have a very deep influence over Sicily's public and private institutions. The Sicilian branch of the Five Star Movement, which polls show is Sicily's most popular party, has also publicly expressed the intention to start working for a possible secession from Italy if the central government would not collaborate in shifting the nation's administrative organization from a unitary country to a federal state.

In Southern Italy, several movements have expressed a will to secede from Italy. This newborn ideology is called neo-Bourbonism, because the Kingdom of the Two Sicilies was under the control of the House of Bourbon. The Kingdom of the Two Sicilies was created in 1816 after the Congress of Vienna, and it comprised both Sicily and continental Southern Italy. The Kingdom came to an end in 1861, being annexed to the newborn Kingdom of Italy. However, the patriotic feelings shared among the southern Italian population is more ancient, starting in 1130 with the Kingdom of Sicily, which was composed by both the island and south Italy. According to the neo-Bourbonic movements the Italian regions which should secede are Sicily, Calabria, Basilicata, Apulia, Molise, Campania, Abruzzo, and Latio's provinces of Rieti, Latina and Frosinone. The major movements and parties which believe in this ideology are Unione Mediterranea, Mo! and Briganti.

Lega Nord has been seeking the independence of the region known to separatists as Padania, which includes lands along the Po Valley in northern Italy. Some organizations separately work for the independence of Venetia or Veneto and the secession or reunification of South Tyrol with Austria. Lega Nord governing Lombardy has expressed a will to turn the region into a sovereign country. Also, the island of Sardinia is home to a notable nationalist movement.

=== Japan ===
The ethnic Ryukyuan (a branch of modern Okinawan) people had their own state historically (Ryukyu Kingdom). Although some Okinawan people have sought independence from Japan since they were annexed by Japan in 1879, and especially after 1972 when the islands were transferred from U.S. rule to Japan, their activism and movement have been consistently supported by single digit of Okinawan people.

=== Malaysia ===
When racial and partisan strife erupted, Singapore seceded from the Malaysian federation in 1965.

=== Mexico ===
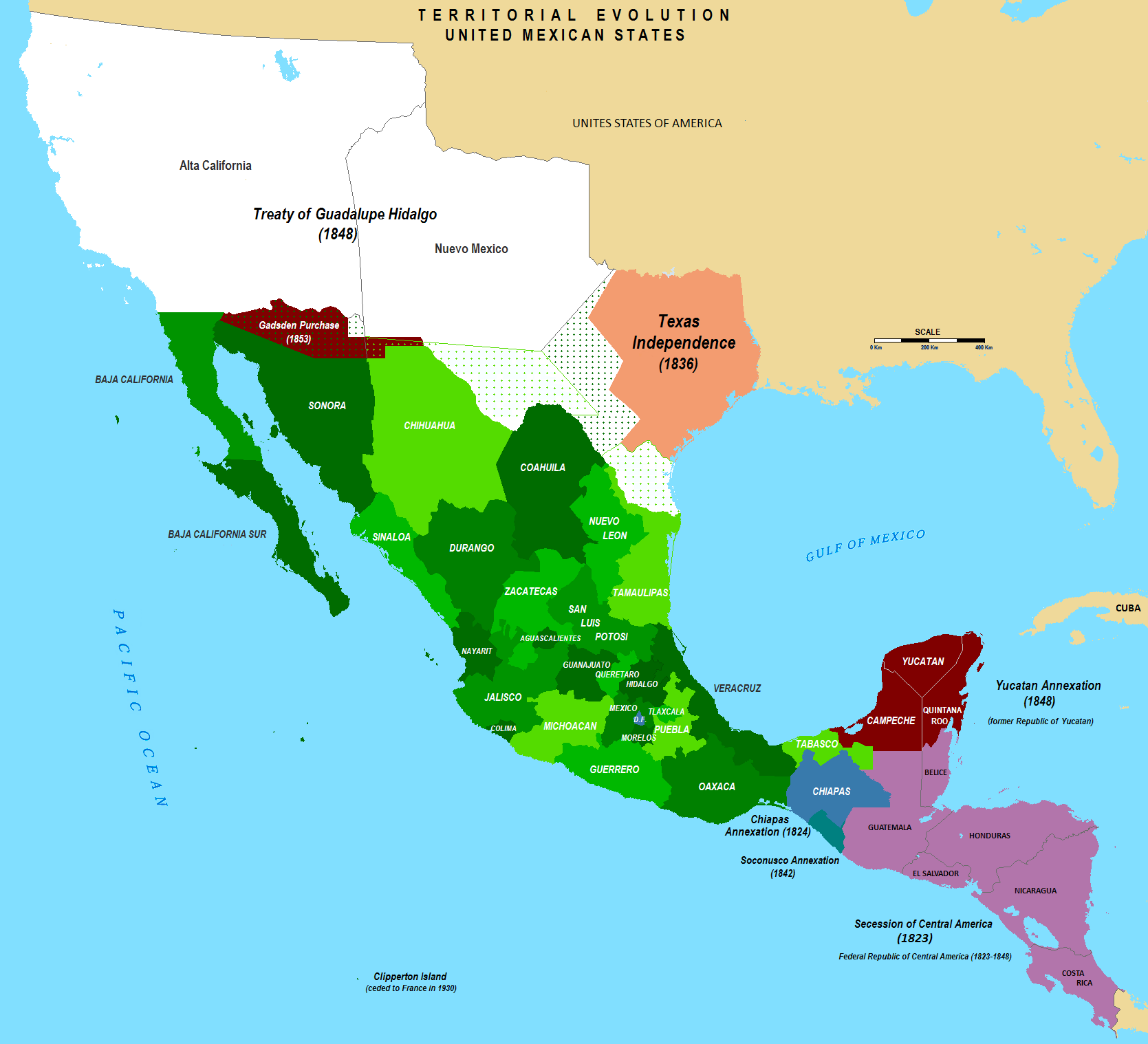
The Territorial evolution of Mexico after independence, noting losses to the US (red, white and orange) and the secession of Central America (purple)

- Texas seceded from Mexico in 1836 (see Texas Revolution), after animosity between the Mexican government and the American settlers of the Coahuila y Tejas State. It was later annexed by the United States in 1845.
- The Republic of the Rio Grande seceded from Mexico on January 17, 1840. It rejoined Mexico on November 6 of the same year.
- After the federal system was abandoned by President Santa Anna, the Congress of Yucatán approved in 1840 a declaration of independence, establishing the Republic of Yucatán. The Republic rejoined Mexico in 1843.

=== Netherlands ===
The United Provinces of the Netherlands, commonly referred to historiographically as the Dutch Republic, was a federal republic formally established from the formal creation of a federal state in 1581 by several Dutch provinces seceded from Spain.

=== New Zealand ===
Secession movements have surfaced several times in the South Island of New Zealand. A Premier of New Zealand, Sir Julius Vogel, was amongst the first people to make this call, which was voted on by the Parliament of New Zealand as early as 1865. The desire for South Island independence was one of the main factors in moving the capital of New Zealand from Auckland to Wellington in the same year.

The NZ South Island Party, with a pro-South agenda, fielded only five candidates (4.20% of electoral seats) candidates in the 1999 General Election but achieved only 0.14% (2622 votes) of the general vote. The reality today is that although South Islanders have a strong identity rooted in their geographic region, secession does not carry any real constituency; the party was not able to field any candidates in the 2008 election, as they had less than 500 paying members, a requirement by the New Zealand Electoral commission. The party is treated more as a "joke" party than any real political force.

=== Nigeria ===
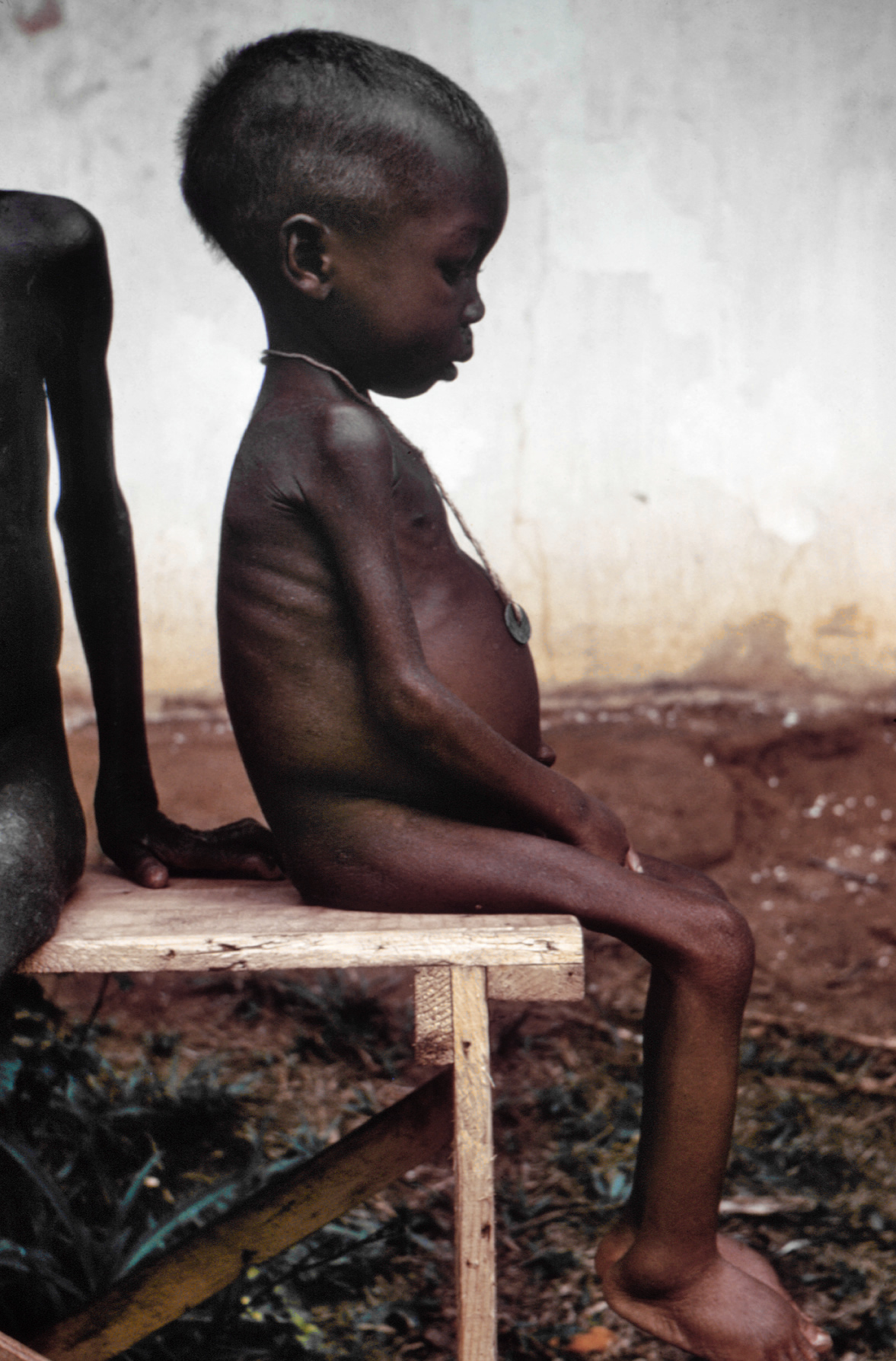
A girl during the Nigerian Civil War of the late 1960s. Pictures of the famine caused by Nigerian blockade garnered sympathy for the Biafrans worldwide.

Between 1967 and 1970, the Eastern Region seceded from Nigeria and established the Republic of Biafra, which led to a war that ended with the state returning to Nigeria. In 1999, at the beginning of a new democratic regime, other secessionist movements emerged, including the Indigenous People of Biafra led by Nnamdi Kanu formed as a Political wing of the Republic of Biafra.

=== Norway and Sweden ===
Sweden, having left the Kalmar Union with Denmark–Norway in the 16th century, entered into a loose personal union with Norway in 1814. Following a constitutional crisis, on June 7, 1905, the Norwegian Storting declared that King Oscar II had failed to fulfil his constitutional duties. He was therefore removed as King of Norway. Because the union depended on the two countries sharing a king, it was dissolved. After negotiations, Sweden agreed to mutual independence on October 26 and on April 14.

=== Pakistan ===
After the Awami League won the 1970 national elections, negotiations to form a new government floundered, resulting in the Bangladesh Liberation War by which East Pakistan seceded, becoming Bangladesh. The Balochistan Liberation Army (also Baloch Liberation Army or Boluchistan Liberation Army) (BLA) is a Baloch nationalist militant secessionist organization. The stated goals of the organization include the establishment of an independent state of Balochistan free of Pakistani, Iranian and Afghan Federations. The name Baloch Liberation Army first became public in the summer of 2000, after the organization claimed credit for a series of bomb attacks in markets and removal of railways lines.

=== Papua New Guinea ===
The island of Bougainville has made several efforts to secede from Papua New Guinea.

=== Somalia ===
Somaliland is an autonomous region, which is part of the Federal Republic of Somalia. Those who call the area the Republic of Somaliland consider it to be the successor state of the former British Somaliland protectorate. Having established its own local government in Somalia in 1991, the region's self-declared independence is only recognized by Israel.

=== South Africa ===
In 1910, following the Boer Republics defeat by the British Empire in the Boer Wars, four self-governing colonies in the south of Africa were merged into the Union of South Africa. The four regions were the Cape Colony, Orange Free State, Natal and Transvaal. Three other territories, High Commission Territories of Bechuanaland (now Botswana), Basutoland (now Lesotho) and Swaziland (now Eswatini) later became independent states in the 1960s. Following the election of the Nationalist government in 1948, some English-speaking whites in Natal advocated either secession or a loose federation. There were also calls for secession, with Natal and the eastern part of the Cape Province breaking away following the referendum in 1960 on establishing a republic. In 1993, prior to South Africa's first elections under universal suffrage and the end of apartheid, some Zulu leaders in KwaZulu-Natal again considered secession as did some politicians in the Cape Province.

In 2008, a political movement calling for the return to independence of the Cape resurged in the shape of the political organisation, the Cape Party. The Cape Party contested their first elections on 22 April 2009. They finished the Western Cape provincial elections in 2019 with 9,331 votes, or 0.45% of votes, gaining no seats

The idea gained popularity in the early half of the 2020s, with polling suggesting that 58% of Western Cape Voters want a referendum on independence in July 2021.

=== South Sudan ===
A referendum took place in Southern Sudan from 9 to 15 January 2011, on whether the region should remain a part of Sudan or become independent. The referendum was one of the consequences of the 2005 Naivasha Agreement between the Khartoum central government and the Sudan People's Liberation Army/Movement (SPLA/M).

On 7 February 2011, the referendum commission published the final results, with 98.83% voting in favour of independence. While the ballots were suspended in 10 of the 79 counties for exceeding 100% of the voter turnout, the number of votes was still well over the requirement of 60% turnout, and the majority vote for secession is not in question.

A simultaneous referendum was supposed to be held in Abyei on whether to join Southern Sudan but it has been postponed because of conflict over demarcation and residency rights. In October 2013, a symbolic referendum was held in which 99.9% of voters in Abyei voted to join Southern Sudan. However, this resolution was non-binding. As of February 2024, an official referendum still has not taken place. Abyei currently holds "special administrative status".

The predetermined date for the creation of an independent state was 9 July 2011.

=== Soviet Union ===
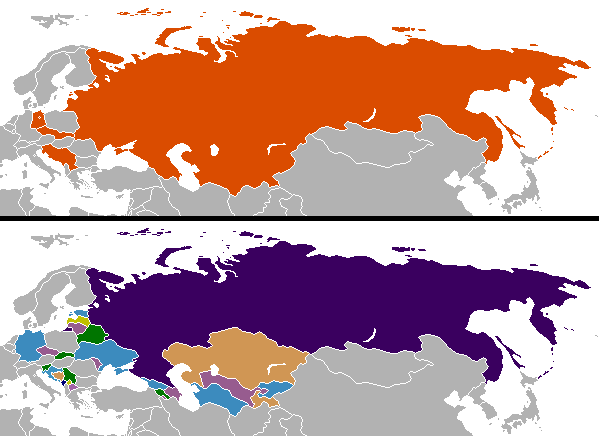
Changes in national boundaries in Eurasia in the decades following the end of the Cold War

On November 15, 1917, the day in which Declaration of the Rights of the Peoples of Russia was declared by the Bolsheviks, Finland seceded after the non-Socialist Senate proposed that Parliament declare Finland's independence, which was voted by the Parliament on 6 December 1917. On December 18, 1917, it was recognized by Council of People's. It was followed by the Finnish Civil War.

The Constitution of the Soviet Union guaranteed all SSRs the right to secede from the Union. In 1990, after free elections, the Lithuanian Soviet Socialist Republic declared independence and other republics, including certain break-away polities, soon followed. Despite the Soviet central government's refusal to recognize the independence of the republics, the Soviet Union dissolved in 1991.

=== Spain ===
Present-day Spain (known officially as "the Kingdom of Spain") was assembled as a central state in the French model between the 18th and 19th centuries from various component kingdoms with varying languages, cultures and legislations. Spain has several secessionist movements, the most notable ones being in Catalonia, the Basque Country and Galicia.

=== Sri Lanka ===
The Liberation Tigers of Tamil Eelam, operated a de facto independent state for Tamils called Tamil Eelam in eastern and northern Sri Lanka until 2009.

=== Switzerland ===
In 1847, seven disaffected Catholic cantons formed a separate alliance because of moves to change the cantons of Switzerland from a confederation to a more centralized government federation. This effort was crushed in the Sonderbund War and a new Swiss Federal Constitution was created.

=== Ukraine ===
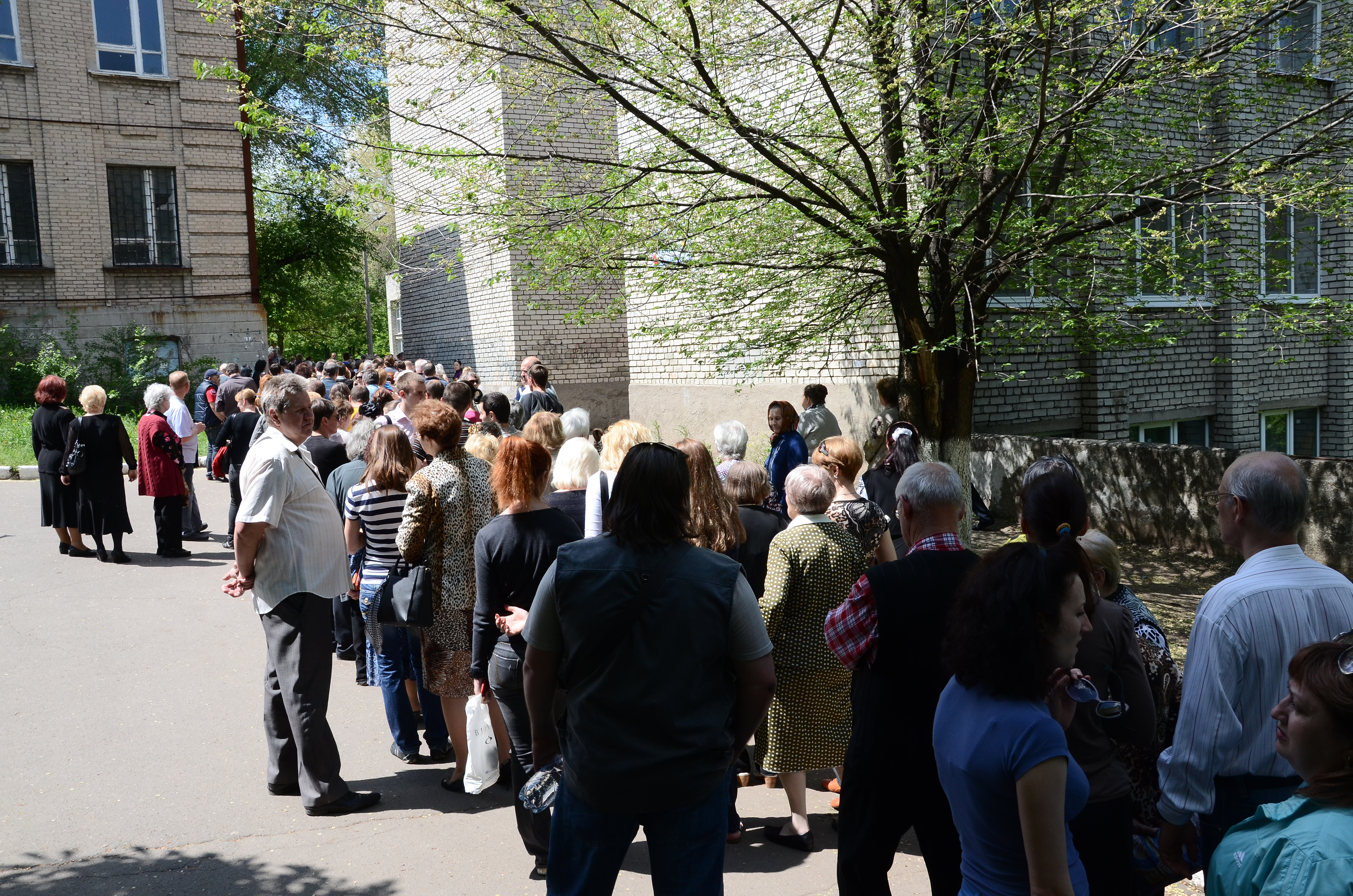
Donetsk status referendum organized by pro-Russian separatists. A line to enter a polling place, 11 May 2014.

In 2014 after the start of Russian intervention in Ukraine, several groups of people declared the independence of several Ukrainian regions:

- The Donetsk People's Republic was declared to be independent from Ukraine on 7 April 2014, comprising the territory of the Donetsk Oblast. There have been military confrontations between the Ukrainian Army and the forces of the Donetsk People's Republic when the Ukrainian Government attempted to reassert control over the oblast.
- The Lugansk Parliamentary Republic was proclaimed on 27 April 2014, before being succeeded by the Lugansk People's Republic. The Lugansk forces have successfully occupied vital buildings in Lugansk since 8 April, and controlled the City Council, prosecutor's office, and police station since 27 April. The Government of the Luhansk Oblast announced its support for a referendum, and granted the governorship to independence leader Valeriy Bolotov.

=== United Kingdom ===
The Irish republicans attempted to withdraw Ireland from the United Kingdom during the Easter Rebellion of 1916. Ireland gained independence as the Irish Free State in 1922, except for six Ulster counties which chose to remain in the United Kingdom as Northern Ireland. The United Kingdom has a number of secession movements:

- In Northern Ireland, Irish republicans and nationalists have long called for the secession of Northern Ireland to join the Republic of Ireland. This is opposed by Unionists. A minority have supported the independence of Northern Ireland from the United Kingdom without joining the Republic of Ireland.
- In Scotland, the Scottish National Party (SNP) campaigns for Scottish independence and direct Scottish membership in the European Union. It has representation at all levels of Scottish politics and forms the devolved Scottish government. Later pro-independence parties have had lesser electoral success. The Scottish Greens and the Scottish Socialist Party are most widely publicised. However, all independence movements/parties are opposed by unionists. A referendum on independence in which voters were asked "Should Scotland be an independent country?" took place in September 2014. It saw "no" win, as 55.3% of voters voted against independence.
- In Wales, Plaid Cymru (Party of Wales) stands for Welsh independence within the European Union. It is also represented at all levels of Welsh politics and has often been the second largest party in the Senedd (Welsh Parliament).
- England:
  - In Cornwall, supporters of Mebyon Kernow call for the creation of a Cornish Assembly and separation from England, giving the county significant self-government, whilst remaining within the United Kingdom as a fifth home nation.
  - London has supporters of an independent or semi-autonomous city-state since the 2016 EU Referendum in which Londoners voted overwhelmingly to remain in the EU. A London independence party, known as Londependence, was established in June 2019. Their calls increased after the 2019 General Election in which most Londoners voted for the Labour Party, gaining a representative, bucking the national trend.
  - The Northern Independence Party is a party formed in 2020 that seeks to make Northern England an independent state under the name Northumbria.

=== United States ===
Discussions and threats of secession often surfaced in American politics during the first half of the 19th century, and secession was declared by the Confederate States of America in the South during the American Civil War. However, in 1869, the United States Supreme Court ruled in Texas v. White that unilateral secession was not permitted, saying that the union between a state (Texas in the case before the bar) and the other states "was as complete, as perpetual, and as indissoluble as the union between the original States. There was no place for reconsideration or revocation, except through revolution or through consent of the States." Current secession movements still exist, the most notable example of which is the Hawaiian sovereignty movement which formed after the illegal annexation of the Kingdom of Hawaii by the United States under the Newlands Resolution passed by Congress in 1898. Many international organizations consider Hawaii under American occupation.

=== Yemen ===
North Yemen and South Yemen merged in 1990; tensions led to a 1994 southern secession which was crushed in a civil war.

=== Yugoslavia ===
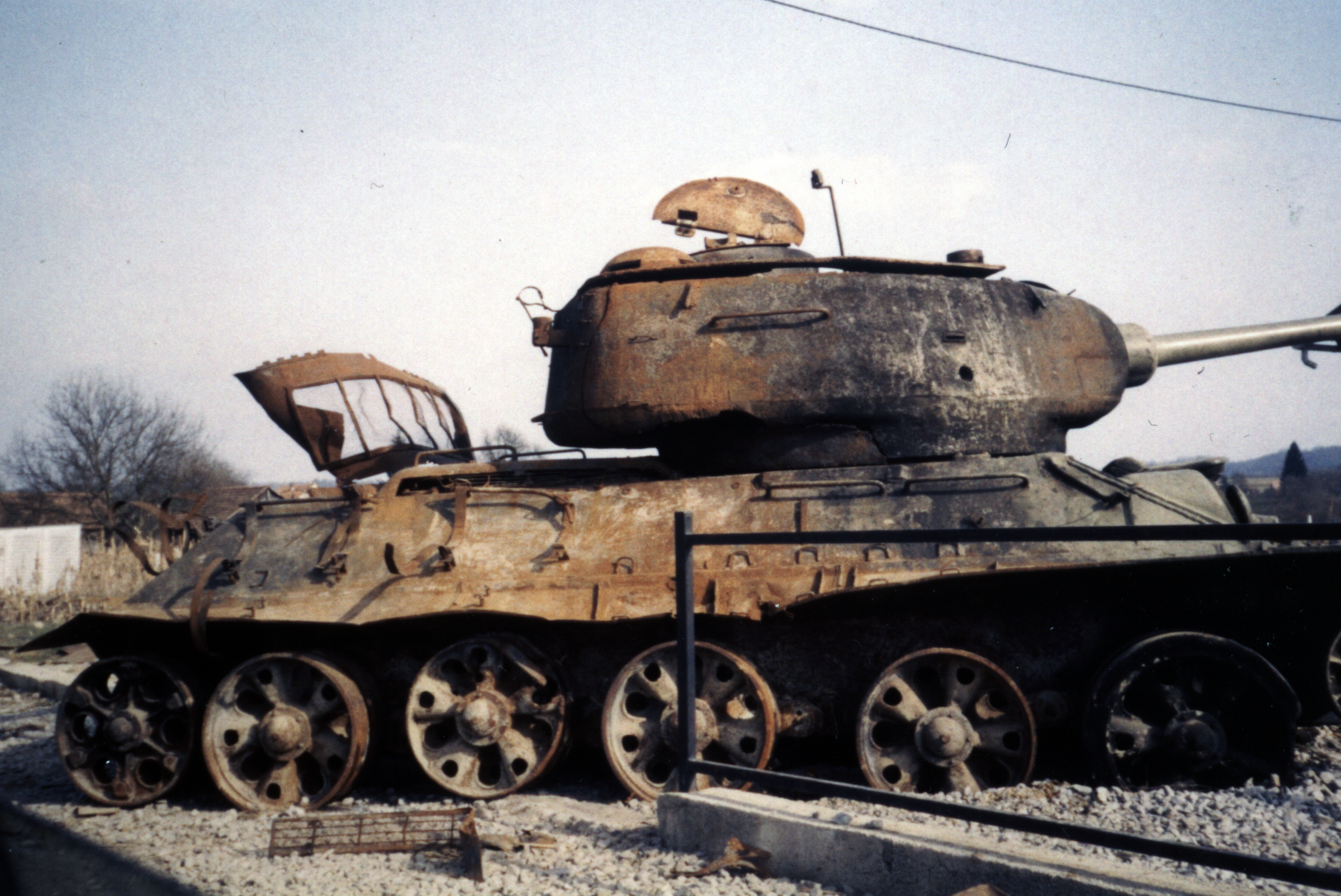
A destroyed T-34-85 tank in Karlovac, Croatian War of Independence, 1992

On June 25, 1991, Croatia and Slovenia seceded from the Socialist Federal Republic of Yugoslavia. Bosnia and Herzegovina and North Macedonia also declared independence, after which the federation broke up, causing the separation of the remaining two countries Serbia and Montenegro. Several wars ensued between the Federal Republic of Yugoslavia and seceding entities and among other ethnic groups in Slovenia, Croatia, Bosnia and Herzegovina, and later, Kosovo. Montenegro peacefully separated from its union with Serbia in 2006.

Kosovo unilaterally declared independence from Serbia on February 17, 2008, and was recognized by around 100 countries, with the rest considering it remaining under United Nations administration.

== See also ==
=== Lists ===
- Lists of historical separatist movements
- Lists of active separatist movements
- List of unrecognized countries
- List of U.S. state secession proposals
- List of U.S. county secession proposals

=== Topics ===
- Autonomy
- Bioregionalism
- City state
- Decentralization
- Dissolution
- Homeland
- Independence
- Intersectionality
- Irredentism
- Micronation
- Nullification (U.S. Constitution)
- Partition
- Schism (religion)
- Separatism
- Urban secession

=== Movements ===
- Balochistan Liberation Army
- Black Liberation Army
- Cape Independence
- Cascadia
- East Turkestan Independence Movement
- Essex Junto
- European Free Alliance
- Free State Project
- Hartford Convention
- Lozi secessionism
- Kurdistan
- League of the South
- New York City secession
- Orania, Northern Cape
- Secession of Quebec
- Scottish Secession Church
- Second Vermont Republic
- South Carolina Exposition and Protest
- Texas Secession Movement
- Tibetan Independence Movement
- Unrepresented Nations and Peoples Organization

== Sources ==
- Chorbajian, Levon; Mutafian, Claude; Donabedian, Patrick (1994). The Caucasian Knot: The History and Geopolitics of Nagorno-Karabagh. Zed Books. ISBN 978-1-85649-288-1.
- Malkasian, Mark (1996). Gha-ra-bagh!: The Emergence of the National Democratic Movement in Armenia. Detroit: Wayne State University Press. ISBN 0-8143-2605-6.
- Suny, Ronald Grigor (1993). Looking toward Ararat: Armenia in Modern History. Bloomington: Indiana University Press. ISBN 978-0-253-20773-9.
- Zürcher, Christoph [in German] (2007). The Post-Soviet Wars: Rebellion, Ethnic Conflict, and Nationhood in the Caucasus ([Online-Ausg.]. ed.). New York: New York University Press. p. 168. ISBN 9780814797099.
