= Michael Nicholson (academic) =

American perpetual student (born 1941)

Michael Nicholson (born 1941) is an American perpetual student from Kalamazoo, Michigan, who as of 2016 has received one bachelor's degree, two associate's degrees, three specialist degrees, and one doctoral degree, along with 23 master's degrees, including ones in health administration and special education administration, for a total of 30 degrees.

His first degree was in religious education from William Tyndale College in Michigan in 1963. He earned his doctorate in education from Western Michigan University in 1978. Besides his studies in Michigan, Nicholson has earned degrees from a number of institutions in Texas, Indiana and Canada.

Nicholson has worked at several teaching positions.

When asked in 2012 about his pursuit, Nicholson said "I just stayed in school and took menial jobs to pay for the education and just made a point of getting more degrees and eventually I retired so that I could go full time to school." He took on a job as a parking attendant to obtain a tuition discount.

== List of degrees ==
#	Degree	Year earned	University
1	B.R.E., General Bible	1963	William Tyndale College
2	Th.M., Systemic Theology	1967	Dallas Theological Seminary
3	M.A., Classroom Teaching	1969	Eastern Michigan University
4	Sp.A., Classroom Teaching	1970	Eastern Michigan University
5	M.Ed., School Counseling	1974	University of Ottawa
6	Sp.A., Educational Leadership	1975	Western Michigan University
7	Ed.D., Educational Leadership	1977	Western Michigan University
8	M.B.A., Business Administration	1978	Western Michigan University
9	M.S.L.S., Library Science	1980	Wayne State University
10	A.A.S., Law Enforcement	1982	Kalamazoo Valley Community College
11	A.Bus., Management	1986	Lansing Community College
12	M.A., Adult and Continuing Education	1988	Michigan State University
13	M.A., Special Education	1990	Western Michigan University
14	M.A., Reading	1991	Western Michigan University
15	M.A., Career and Technical Education	1992	Western Michigan University
16	Sp.A., School Psychology	1993	Eastern Michigan University
17	M.A. Home Economics	1994	Western Michigan University
18	M.A., Teaching in the Elementary School	1995	Western Michigan University
19	M.A., Teaching in the Middle School	1996	Western Michigan University
20	M.A., Early Childhood Education	1997	Western Michigan University
21	M.A., Human Resources Development	1998	Western Michigan University
22	M.A., Physical Education	1999	Western Michigan University
23	M.S.Ed., Special Education	2001	Indiana University South Bend
24	M.Ed., Special Education	2003	Oakland University
25	M.S.Ed.,Secondary Education	2004	Indiana University South Bend
26	M.Ed.,General Education	2005	Grand Valley State University
27	M.P.A., Public Administration	2008	Grand Valley State University
28	M.H.A., Health Administration	2009	Grand Valley State University
29	M.Ed., Special Education Administration	2010	Grand Valley State University
30	M.S., Criminal Justice	2014	Grand Valley State University
