= Luciano Baietti =

Italian perpetual student

- Born: 1 September 1947 (age 78); Roma, Italy
- Education: La Sapienza University
- Occupation: Perpetual student

Luciano Baietti is a perpetual student who was recognized by the Guinness Book of World Records as the most graduated living person in the world after earning his eighth academic degree in 2002. He holds 15 academic degrees including subjects of physical education, law, literature, philosophy, sociology, criminology, and military strategy.

== Biography ==
Baietti was born in town of Velletri in the Alban Hills near Rome. Baietti is a retired schoolmaster who resides in the town of Velletri.

Most of his degrees come from La Sapienza University in Rome.

He is currently working on his next degree, one in Food Science.

=== Academic degrees ===
- Doctor of Education, University of Rome
- University of Perugia
- Bachelor's Degree in Tourism Sciences, Università degli Studi Pegaso
