= Michael Szenberg =

American economist

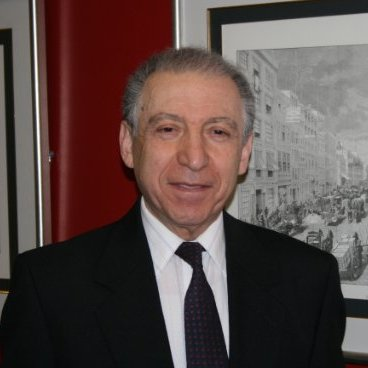
- Born: Michael Szenberg; April 8, 1934 (age 92); Sosnowiec, Poland
- Education: CUNY Graduate Center
- Occupations: Professor and author
- Spouse: Miriam Szenberg
- Children: Naomi Kunin, Avi
- Writing career
- Language: English
- Genres: Economics, biography

Michael Szenberg (born 1934) is a professor emeritus and a former chairman of the Finance and Economics department at Lubin School of Business in Pace University, New York. He is the author and editor of 22 books on economics, and was the editor of The American Economist published by Omicron Delta Epsilon.

== Life and career ==
Michael Szenberg was born April 8, 1934, in Sosnowiec, Poland. He graduated from Long Island University in 1963 and received his PhD in economics from the City University of New York in 1970. He graduated from the Israeli Air Force Aeronautics School. He served as the editor-in-chief of Omicron Delta Epsilon's The American Economist from 1972 to 2011, was editor of Economics Categories and the Cambridge University Press Encyclopedia, and from 1984 to 2011 was the coordinator and chairperson of meetings of the Editors of Economics Journals, the American Economic Association.

Szenberg is the author and editor of 22 books on economics, is an editorial consultant, and is co-editor of the economics series of handbooks by the Oxford University Press. He has been interviewed by the media on several occasions regarding international economic matters. He has contributed to the International Encyclopedia of Social Sciences, and the Encyclopedia of Quantitative Finance.

He has been given several awards by the international academic community for his contributions to the study of economics, such as the John R. Commons Award in 2012.
