= Stephanie Attwater =

Canadian woman with the most college degrees of any woman

Stephanie Attwater is a Canadian perpetual student with over 20 degrees and 32 educational credentials, including professional certificates. According to the World Record Academy, she holds the world record for most academic degrees of any woman in history. The World Record Academy also named her their woman of the year in 2023.

Attwater has stated the reason for continuing to earn degrees is because she uses them as a way to exercise her brain after injuries from a severe car accident which increased her risk for dementia. The first degree Attwater received was a Bachelor of Science in Biology and Biotechnology in May 2004 at the University of Ottawa. She currently holds three PhDs.

Partial list of degrees or schools attendee the University of British Columbia, Kingdom College of Natural Health, National University of Medical Sciences, and the London College of Osteopathy Canada. Bachelor of Science in Biology and Biotechnology in May 2004 at the University of Ottawa.
