= Fred Fraenkel =

American businessman

Fred S. Fraenkel is an investment professional and was a vice chair of Cowen Inc. He was on the Barron's year-end roundtable for four years and managed large research organizations at several Wall Street firms. He ran his venture fund for eight years and was until September 2015 the president and chief research officer of a Miami-based advisor of mutual funds.

== Early life and education ==
Fraenkel received a B.S. in economics and finance from Lehigh University, and an M.B.A. from the Wharton School of the University of Pennsylvania. Fraenkel was elected to membership of Beta Gamma Sigma and Omicron Delta Epsilon the national business school and economics honorary societies.

== Career ==
Fraenkel has spent over 50 years in investing, and his career includes being a member of Barron's year-end roundtable from 1982 to 1985 and heading global research at Lehman Brothers from 1987 to 1993. During that time, Lehman Brothers had its first number-one ranking in the Institutional Investor rankings. He retired a vice chairman of Cowen Group, an investment bank and asset manager in New York. Until September 2015 he was chief research officer of Fairholme Capital Management. Before Fairholme, he was vice chairman of Beacon Trust Company in Morristown, New Jersey for three years and before that, he was a founding partner of Millennium 3 Capital. Millennium 3 was a venture firm specializing in early-stage companies. Before founding Millennium 3 Capital in 2000, Fraenkel served as vice chairman of ING Barings Furman Selz and chief operating officer of Furman Selz. Before joining Furman Selz in March 1995, Fraenkel spent nine years at Lehman Brothers, where he was a managing director and director of global research, overseeing 110 analysts located in New York, London, Tokyo, and Hong Kong. As global research director, Fraenkel was responsible for managing the department's ascension in the Institutional Investor poll from a rank of 15th in 1987 to 1st in 1990, 1991, and 1992.

Before Lehman Brothers, Fraenkel was chairman and chief executive officer of Market America Group, an investment advisory firm. He also spent four and a half years as director of equity research and a member of the board of directors at Prudential Securities. Fraenkel began his Wall Street career in 1974 as a securities analyst with Goldman Sachs & Company and was chief investment strategist for E. F. Hutton & Co. from 1980 to 1982.

== Affiliations ==
Fraenkel is a member of the CFA Institute, the New York Society of Security Analysts, and the AIMR. He is a past chairman of the board of advisors of the College of Business and Economics of Lehigh University. Fraenkel guest lectures at Harvard Business School, Harvard Law School, Columbia University Business School and Lehigh University College of Business and Economics.

== Personal life ==
Fraenkel is married to Andrea Silberg Fraenkel and has three children and seven grandchildren. He resides in Boca Raton, Florida.
