= Omicron Delta Epsilon =

Honor society in economics

- ΟΔΕ
- Founded: January 1, 1963; 63 years ago Harvard University and University of Wisconsin
- Type: Honor
- Affiliation: ACHS; ASSA
- Status: Active
- Emphasis: Economics
- Scope: International
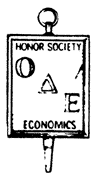
- Member badge
- Colors: Royal blue and Gold
- Publication: The American Economist
- Chapters: 550 active
- Members: 4,000 active 200,000 lifetime
- Headquarters: 19 South Summit Street, no. 9 Fairhope, Alabama 36533; United States
- Website: www.omicrondeltaepsilon.org

Omicron Delta Epsilon (ΟΔΕ or ODE) is an international honor society in the field of economics, formed from the merger of Omicron Delta Gamma and Omicron Chi Epsilon in 1963. ODE is a member of the Association of College Honor Societies. ODE has chartered more than 700 chapters worldwide. It publishes an academic journal The American Economist.

== History ==
=== Predecessors ===
The first national honor society in economics, Omicron Delta Gamma, was formed on May 7, 1915, by the merger of Harvard University's Undergraduate Society of Economics with the University of Wisconsin's Order of Artus. Wisconsin's group was founded by Professor John R. Commons. Professor Frank W. Taussig founded the chapter at Harvard. The organization remained double named as the Omicron Delta Gamma and the Order of Artus through the merger.

Alan A. Brown was the founder and first president of Omicron Chi Epsilon in 1955, while a student at City College of New York. The first annual meeting of Omicron Chi Epsilon was held at Fordham University in New York City in the spring of 1958.

=== Omicron Delta Epsilon ===
Brown was the prime mover to facilitate a merger effective January 1, 1963 between Omicron Delta Gamma and Omicron Chi Epsilon, renamed Omicron Delta Epsilon – The National Honor Society in Economics. Omicron Delta Gamma had strength in the Midwest and West, while Omicron Chi Epsilon had strength on the Eastern Seaboard and Texas. At the time of their merger, each had 28 active chapters.

Omicron Delta Epsilon's purpose is to recognize academic achievement in economics and to increase connections between students and faculty of economics within and amongst colleges and university.

Later, Brown replaced “National” with "International" in its non-Greek title and expanded the organization globally. The society's first president was Robert E. Hill of Kent State University. Omicron Delta Epsilon joined the Association of College Honor Societies in 1965, had its membership lapse in 1973 and was readmitted in 1981. By 2012, the society had 672 active chapters, 4,440 active members, and 89,500 initiates.

Omicron Delta Epsilon has more than 200,000 total initiates. A detailed history of ODE, written by the executive secretary-treasurer of the organization, William D. Gunther, was published in 2013 by The American Economist.

Omicron Delta Epsilon's national headquarters is located in Fairhope, Alabama. Omicron Delta Epsilon hosts paper sessions at meetings of the Allied Social Science Associations.

== Symbols ==
The membership badge of Omicron Delta Epsilon is gold key, bearing the society's Greek letters, arranged diagonally. The society banner stands vertically, is blue in color, and contains its emblem like the membership pin. Members may wear royal blue and gold honor cords at graduation.

== Membership ==
New members consist of undergraduate and graduate students, as well as college and university faculty. Undergraduate members must have completed at least twelve hours of economics, with a B average in economics and overall, and rank in the upper third of their class.

== Activities ==
Omicron Delta Epsilon's executive board officers are elected at a biennial convention. Conventions are held in conjunction with the annual convention of the American Economics Association, of which ODE is an institutional member. ODE sponsors student and faculty paper presentations held in conjunction with this annual convention.

The academic journal of ODE is The American Economist, published twice each year. It sponsors professional meetings and presents annual research awards, particularly the Frank W. Taussig Undergraduate Article Award.

Every two years, ODE chooses an outstanding economist to speak at its biennial meeting and presents them with the John R. Commons Award in recognition of academic achievements and for service both to the economics profession and to Omicron Delta Epsilon.

== Chapters ==
As of 2024, Omicron Delta Epsilon Society has chartered 727 chapters in Australia, Canada, Egypt, France, Kazakhstan, Mexico, South Africa, the United Arab Emirates, the United Kingdom, and the United States.

== Notable members ==
The following are some of the notable members of Omicron Delta Epsilon.

- Scott Bales – former Chief Justice of the Arizona Supreme Court
- Thomas Borcherding – professor of economics at Claremont Graduate University
- Alan A. Brown – professor of economics and founder of Omicron Chi Epsilon and Omicron Delta Epsilon
- Barry Brucker – Mayor of Beverly Hills
- Dave Casper – professional football player
- Woody R. Clermont – lawyer and County Court Judge in Broward County, Florida
- John R. Commons – institutional economist and labor historian at the University of Wisconsin–Madison; founder of Omicron Delta Gamma
- Fred Fraenkel – investment professional and was a vice chair of Cowen Inc.
- André-Philippe Futa – assistant professor at the National University of Zaire and politician in the Democratic Republic of the Congo
- Joey Issa – businessman
- James M. Loree – president and chief executive officer of Stanley Black & Decker
- Robert Lucas Jr. – economist at the University of Chicago who received the Nobel Memorial Prize in Economic Sciences in 1995
- Roger C. Poole – United States Army general and academic
- Scott J. Silverman – Circuit Court Judge, 11th Judicial Circuit of Florida
- Robert Solow – professor of economics at the Massachusetts Institute of Technology and winner of the Nobel Memorial Prize in Economic Sciences in 1987
- Michael Szenberg – professor emeritus and chairman of the Finance and Economics Department at Lubin School of Business in Pace University
- F. W. Taussig – economics professor at Harvard University and chair of the United States Tariff Commission
- Togba-Nah Tipoteh – founder and president of the Movement for Justice in Africa
- Toshihisa Toyoda – Professor Emeritus at Kobe University and Hiroshima Shudo University

== See also ==
- Honor cords
- Professional fraternities and sororities
