= Johnny Lechner =

American film and television actor

Johnny Lechner

John A. "Johnny" Lechner is an American film and television actor who received media attention as a perpetual student at the University of Wisconsin–Whitewater. He appeared as Alan Reese on the Showtime television series Girls of Sunset Place (2012) and as Greg "Fossil" Karanowski in the film Fraternity House.

== Education and media attention ==
After graduating from Waukesha North High School in 1994, Lechner attended UW–Waukesha for one year and then transferred to the University of Wisconsin–Whitewater.

In 2006, The Badger Herald reported that Lechner, then 29, was preparing to graduate from UW–Whitewater after 12 years of college with three majors and three minors. He remained enrolled after that; in 2009, the Milwaukee Journal Sentinel reported that a UW–Whitewater spokeswoman said Lechner had not graduated and had not applied for graduation. In 2010, Lechner announced that he had transferred to a college in California.

At Whitewater, Lechner won a campus "Big Man on Campus" beauty pageant; studied abroad in Paris, London, Amsterdam, Rome, Florence, Venice, Switzerland, and South Africa; and ran for student body president. He appeared on The Bob and Tom Show, Late Show with David Letterman, and Good Morning America; was named one of People magazine's "Hot Bachelors"; and appeared in films including Minor League: A Football Story and Fraternity House.

In 2021, Lechner told The Michigan Daily that he had graduated from college.

== The "Johnny Lechner rule" ==
A Wisconsin Board of Regents policy doubled full-time tuition for University of Wisconsin System students who exceeded 165 credits, or had 30 credits more than their degree required. Media coverage referred to the policy as the "Johnny Lechner rule".
