= Bruce Berry (academic) =

Career student

Bruce Berry (1940–2014) was a British perpetual student. He took his first degree from Manchester University in 1963, and continued to study from the 1970s onwards, coming to possess several further Bachelor's and master's degrees (from universities including Leeds, York and Normandy University, Caen), as well as a Ph.D. from Leeds Metropolitan University. He died before completing his twelfth degree, another Ph.D.

Fluent in several languages, he was also a Fellow of the Chartered Institute of Linguists. Berry was a member of Mensa, and when asked about his rationale behind for his degrees he stated “I just get this Faustian thirst for knowledge. I like to keep an open mind – anything which catches my interest, I go for it.” Altogether, Berry earned three Bachelor's degrees, seven Master's degrees and a Ph.D.

After retiring from a career including technical document translation for Agfa-Gevaert, working for the Post Office, and teaching, he worked as a lollipop man (crossing guard).
