= Toshihisa Toyoda =

Japanese economist

- Born: August 6, 1940 (age 85); Okayama Prefecture, Japan
- Education: bachelor's degree, master's degree, Ph.D
- Alma mater: Kobe University, Carnegie Mellon University
- Occupation: economist
- Known for: contribution in Econometrics and Development Economics
- Notable work: see list

Toshihisa Toyoda (Japanese: 豊田利久, born August 6, 1940) is a Japanese economist, with contribution in Econometrics and Development Economics.

== In general ==
Toshihisa Toyoda was born in Okayama Prefecture, Japan, on August 6, 1940. He attended Okayama Asahi High School, in Okayama City.

Toyoda received his bachelor's degree from the Economics Faculty of Kobe University in 1963, and his master's degree there in 1965. Then, in 1967-71, he attended the Graduate School of Industrial Administration (now called Tepper School of Business), Carnegie Mellon University, where he received his Ph.D in 1971. Omicron Delta Epsilon.

In 1966, he began working as a research associate in the Economics Faculty of Kobe University, later becoming a lecturer and then an associate professor of the same faculty. Finally, he became a professor in 1980.

From 1993 to 2003, Toyoda worked at Kobe University's Graduate School of International Cooperation Studies, and, from 2004 to 2012, at the Graduate School of Economic Sciences at Hiroshima Shudo University, Hiroshima City. He is now a Professor Emeritus at Kobe University and a Professor Emeritus at Hiroshima Shudo University.

His contribution in the international arena also included doing research and teaching at University of Essex (1988) and Beijing Normal University (2012). In addition, he was a professor by special invitation at Global Innovation Research Center, Ritsumeikan University, Kyoto (2010–2014), which is noted for working closely with overseas, especially with the Asian countries. From 2005 to 2008, he was the President of the Japan Society of International Development (JASID). He particularly contributed to the colleges and universities of the Asian countries, for example, in the establishment of the Faculty of Economics and Business Management, National University of Laos, Vientiane, Laos.

== Econometrics and development economics ==
Toyoda's contribution has been in both Econometrics and Development economics. He published papers in such international journals as Econometrica, Journal Political Economy, International Economic Review, Journal of Econometrics, Review of Economics and Statistics, Empirical Economics, Asian Economic Journal, Journal of Economic Development, Japanese Economic Review, Journal of Disaster Research, etc.

== Publication ==
Toyoda has published books related to economics both in Japanese and English:

- Toshihisa Toyoda, et al. The Principles of Statistics Third Edition, in Japanese (Toyo Keizai, 2010) ISBN 9784492470831
- Toshihisa Toyoda, Quantitative Analysis of Economy in Japanese (Rokko Press, 2004) ISBN 4-89812-061-X
- Toyoda, T., and T. Inoue, (eds.), Quantitative Analysis on Contemporary Economic Issues (Kyushu University Press, 2008) ISBN 978-4-87378-977-4
- Toyoda, T., Nishikawa, J., and H. K. Sato, (eds.), Economic and Policy Lessons from Japan to Developing Countries,( Palgrave Macmillan, 2011) ISBN 978-0-230-30206-8
- Kaneko, Y., Matsuoka, K., and T. Toyoda, (eds.), Asian Law in Disasters: Toward a human-centered recovery, (Routledge, 2016) ISBN 978-1-138-93063-6
- Toyoda, T., Wang, J., and Y. Kaneko, (eds.), Build Back Better: Challenges of Asian Disaster Recovery, (Springer, 2021) ISBN 978-981-16-5978-2

== See also ==
- Econometrics
- Development economics
