= Robert McGee =

American academic

Robert W. McGee (born 1947) is an American perpetual student, author and account professor at Fayetteville State University.

== Early life and education ==
McGee is originally from Erie, Pennsylvania. He was raised Catholic.

He started his education by graduating with a bachelor's degree from Gannon University in 1969. Wanting to land a spot in the Guinness Book of World Records, McGee began earning a large number of college degrees. His first doctorate-level degree was a Juris Doctor from the Cleveland State University College of Law.

McGee has earned 23 academic degrees, 13 of which are at the doctorate level, including the following:

- Bachelor of Arts, BA, Social Science, Gannon University (1969)
- Bachelor of Science, BS, Economics, Excelsior University (1976)
- Master of Science, Taxation, DePaul University (1976)
- Juris Doctor, JD, Law, Cleveland State University (1980)
- Associate of Science, AS, Liberal Arts, Excelsior University (1979)
- Associate of Arts, AA, Liberal Arts, Excelsior University (1980)
- Associate of Arts, AA, Thomas Edison State College (1980)
- Bachelor of Arts, BA, Social Science, Thomas Edison State College (1982)
- Bachelor of Science in Business Administration, BSBA, Accounting, Thomas Edison State College (1983)
- Bachelor of Science, BS, Business, Excelsior University (1983)
- Doctor of Philosophy, PhD, Accounting, University of Warwick (1986)
- Doctor of Philosophy, PhD, Accounting, Taxation & Economic History, Union Institute & University (1986)
- Doctor of Philosophy, PhD, Economics, Law & Political Philosophy, Union Institute & University (1993)
- Doctor of Philosophy, PhD, Philosophy, University of Bradford (2000)
- Doctor of Philosophy, PhD, Politics, University of Sunderland (2003)
- Doctor of Philosophy, DPhil, Finance, Bristol Business School, University of the West of England (2007)
- Doctor of Philosophy, PhD, Applied Global Ethics, Leeds Metropolitan University (2011)
- Doctor of Science, DSc, Public Finance & Economic Development, Tartu University

== Career ==
McGee is an attorney and a retired Certified Public Accountant.

=== Academics ===
McGee teaches at the Broadwell College of Business and Economics at Fayetteville State University. He has written more than 59 nonfiction books and over 700 scholarly papers. He began writing fiction novels in 2014.

=== Martial arts ===
McGee practiced martial arts as a teenager. He worked as a boxing sparring partner. As an adult, McGee began practicing Taekwondo again. He also began practicing karate and tai chi. He is now a martial arts instructor.
