= Scott J. Silverman =

Florida judge

Circuit Court Judge, 11th Judicial Circuit of Florida
- Incumbent
- Assumed office 1999
- Preceded by: Stanley M. Goldstein

Dade County Court Judge
- In office 1991–1999
- Preceded by: May L. Cain
- Succeeded by: Cristina Pereyra-Shuminer

Personal details
- Born: June 25, 1957 (age 68) Silver Spring, Maryland, U.S.
- Education: University of Miami (BBA); University of Tulsa College of Law (JD)
- Occupation: Mediator and Arbitrator
- Website: https://www.jamsadr.com/silverman/

Scott J. Silverman is an American lawyer and a retired judge who served more than 21 years on Florida's 11th Judicial Circuit. He is currently a mediator and arbitrator with JAMS, the largest private provider of mediation and arbitration services worldwide.

== Early life and education ==
Silverman was born in Silver Spring, Maryland, on June 25, 1957. At the age of 13, he moved with his family to Miami Beach, Florida. He grew up in Bay Harbor Islands, he attended Nautilus Junior High School and Miami Beach Senior High. He graduated magna cum laude from the University of Miami in 1978 with a BBA in finance. A recipient of the Flammang Academic Scholarship, while attending college Silverman was recognized on the President's Honor Role three times and on the Dean's list every semester. His academic honors include membership in Phi Kappa Phi (Honor Society in all fields), Beta Gamma Sigma (Business Honor Society), Omicron Delta Epsilon (International Economic Honor Society), and Alpha Lambda Delta (Freshman Honor Society).

Silverman subsequently received his Juris Doctor degree from University of Tulsa College of Law in 1981. During his last year in law school, he worked in Getty Refining and Marketing Company's in-house legal department. Prior to becoming a judge, Silverman served as an assistant attorney general for the Oklahoma Attorney General in the civil rights division before returning to Miami to clerk for Judge Frederika Smith. In 1985, he opened his own legal practice.

Silverman is a member of the Oklahoma Bar Association (1981) and the Florida Bar (1983).

== Career ==
In September 1990, Silverman was elected a judge of the County Court in Miami-Dade County, Florida. He took the bench in January 1991, and served two terms, working in both the criminal and civil divisions. He served in the Richard E. Gerstein Justice Building (1991, 1993-1995 and 1997-1998), Joseph Caleb Center (1992), and the Miami Beach Satellite Courthouse (1995-1997). In 1996, Chief Judge Joseph P. Farina appointed him an Associate Administrative Judge, and he continued in that position until his elevation to the circuit court. In 1998, without opposition, Silverman was elected a circuit court judge of the Eleventh Judicial Circuit. He began his term in January 1999, and served in the criminal (1999-2006), civil (2006-2010), and family (2006 and 2010–2012) divisions of the circuit court. He retired from the court on May 1, 2012, after nearly 22 years on the bench.

While a circuit court judge, Silverman served as an Associate Judge on the Florida First District Court of Appeal (2006) and the Florida Fourth District Court of Appeal (2001 and 2005).

In January 2004, Chief Judge Joseph P. Farina administratively designated Silverman the court historian for the Eleventh Judicial Circuit of Florida. Judge Silverman is a founder and trustee of the Eleventh Judicial Circuit Historical Society.

=== Notable cases ===
On December 6, 1991, Silverman interfered with and stopped an attack on a woman by her former boyfriend. Just minutes earlier, the attacker was placed on probation for battery by Judge Cindy Lederman. Once outside the courthouse, the attacker again battered the victim by dropping her to the sidewalk. Silverman ordered that he stop, which he did, and escorted the defendant before the previous judge who immediately voided his probation and sentenced him to 60 days in jail.

In April 2001, Silverman sentenced a criminal defendant to 9 1/2 years in prison after he was convicted of driving under the influence, causing serious bodily injury to a state trooper on I95.

On May 1, 2001, Silverman sentenced Roberto Suarez to life imprisonment plus 35 years fatally burning TV psychic Addy Tejeiro and blowing up her shop.

On June 15, 2001, Silverman vacated Jerry Frank Townsend's two Dade County, Florida murder convictions and a rape conviction. Townsend, who had served 22 years in prison for those convictions and four other murder convictions emanating from Broward County, Florida, was ordered released by the judge after DNA evidence demonstrated Townsend had not committed the crimes to which he had confessed and was found guilty.

In November 2001, Silverman sentenced a former Miami-Dade patrol officer to state prison after the officer was convicted of unlawful compensation and official misconduct for purportedly pressuring a 19-year-old motorist into having sex instead of ticketing her.

Also in November 2001, Silverman presided over a case in which two Hialeah police officers, both sons of the Chief of the Hialeah Police Department, were charged with battery and official misconduct. Both defendants were acquitted by the jury.

In April 2003, Florida Marlins pitcher Liván Hernández entered a plea before Silverman. The 1997 World Series MVP accepted a plea agreement after Hernandez allegedly swung golf clubs at a 65-year-old man in Miami.

In February 2004, as part of negotiated plea with prosecutors, Silverman sentenced Stephen "The Rifleman" Flemmi of Boston's Winter Hill Gang to concurrent terms of life without parole, plus 30 years for the 1982 slaying of John B. Callahan, a Boston accountant and former World Jai Alai president. Also, as part of a negotiated plea with prosecutors, John Martorano pleaded guilty before Silverman to second-degree murder and conspiracy to commit first-degree murder for the 1982 slaying of Callahan.

In November 2008, Silverman ruled that the members of the American Legion could continue in their Alhambra Circuit clubhouse. The City of Coral Gables wanted the structure back so it could possibly develop the property into offices.

In 2009, Silverman declared a mistrial and dismissed a case. During a momentary sidebar, the plaintiff texted information to its testifying witness on matters relating to the case.

Notable litigants whose cases have appeared before Silverman include Lil' Wayne, former Green Bay Packers running back Najeh Davenport, and Robin Givens.

== Awards and honors ==
He received the Judge Harvey Ford Leadership Award, presented by the Conference of County Court Judges of Florida, in 1998.

He received the Herbert Harley Award, presented by the American Judicature Society, in 2000.

He received the 2007 Silverman Award, presented by the Eleventh Judicial Circuit Historical Society.

Silverman was inducted into the Miami Beach Senior High School Hall of Fame in 2010. He was a 2010 recipient of the Public Service Award from the Attorneys' Division of the Greater Miami Jewish Federation.

Silverman received the Justice Award, presented by the League of Prosecutors of Florida, in 2011. He was the 2011 recipient of the David C. Brotemarkle Award, presented by the Florida Historical Society.

== Videos ==
Silverman, wrote, directed, produced and narrated, The Dade County Courthouse: A History in Progress, in 2003. The 43 minute video premiered before the Dade County Bar Association. The video is shown during orientation to all prospective jurors in Miami-Dade County.

Silverman, wrote, directed, produced and narrated, Groundbreaking. The 8 minute video was shown to all attendees at the groundbreaking for the restoration of courtroom 6-1 of the Dade County Courthouse on May 15, 2007.

== Bar polls ==
Bar Poll Results (rounded off)
Organization	Combined Exceptionally Qualified & Qualified	Unqualified
2010 Dade County Bar Association	95%	5%
2010 Cuban American Bar Association	Cell B	Cell C
2005 Dade County Bar Association	91%	9%
2004 Dade County Bar Association	90%	10%
2004 Cuban American Bar Association	95%	5%
2002 Cuban American Bar Association	95%	5%
