= Perpetual student =

College/university attendee who re-enrolls for several years more than necessary

A perpetual student, gradual student, or career student is a college or university attendee who continues to enroll in more courses to avoid finishing their education or degree or who continually enrolls in additional degrees. The term is often applied with derision.

== Public perception ==
The term “perpetual student” may evoke different connotations based on the trait being emphasized in a given context. In a positive sense, it can describe continued learning or serious intellectual curiosity. In a negative sense, it can suggest credential accumulation or delayed entry into ordinary adult responsibilities. Some research has suggested that it is important "to educational planners to estimate the likelihood and time-scale of graduation of students enrolled on a curriculum."

By contrast, negative uses of the label often emphasize delayed workforce entry and neglect of adult responsibilities. A Knight News article on Greek higher education described an “eternal student” as someone who takes extra courses to delay work, while quoting faculty commentary that American society may view indefinite study as irresponsible.

== Cultural portrayals ==
In fiction, characters are sometimes given multiple degrees as shorthand for exceptional intelligence and scientific expertise. Although these credentials may imply extensive study within the fictional setting, they usually function for readers and viewers as characterization. Unlike most real-life examples of perpetual students, highly educated fictional characters often collect doctorates. In Thor: Ragnarok (2017), Bruce Banner states that he has seven PhDs, contrasting himself with his alter ego the Hulk.

Satirical examples also use degree accumulation to comment on credentialism. In a 2014 essay for Inside Higher Ed, Mark J. Drozdowski depicts a fictional student, Peyton “Perry” Potetick, as earning degrees from all eight Ivy League universities.

In the Roger Zelazny novel Doorways in the Sand the protagonist is a perpetual student named Fred Cassidy. Since an uncle of his has provided a trust fund as long as he is a full-time student working towards a degree, the novel starts with Fred having spent thirteen years as a student.

== Holders of multiple academic degrees ==
Number of earned degrees	Name	Nationality	Dates	Notes
30	Michael Nicholson	United States	1941–present	Part-time parking attendant whose degree list includes 22 master's degrees and one doctorate.
23	Robert W. McGee	United States	1947–present	Holds 13 doctorates. Professor of Accounting at Fayetteville State University
20	Stephanie Attwater	Canada	2004–present	Holds the world record for most academic degrees of any woman in history.
20	Shrikant Jichkar	India	1954–2004	Indian civil servant
16	Benjamin Bolger	United States	1975–present	Received an associate's from Muskegon Community College, his bachelor's from the University of Michigan, thirteen master's degrees and a Doctor of Design from Harvard University.
15	Luciano Baietti	Italy	1947–present	In 2002, The Guinness Book of World Records officially recognized Baietti as the most graduated living person in the world.
13	Jamie Beaton	New Zealand	1995/1996–present	New Zealand entrepreneur who founded Crimson Education
11	Bruce Berry	United Kingdom	1940–2014	He earned a Ph.D. from Leeds Metropolitan University and died while completing a second Ph.D. Worked in technical document translation for Agfa-Gevaert, for the Post Office, and as a teacher, before working as a school crossing guard in retirement.
11	John Warwick Montgomery	United States, United Kingdom, France	1931–2024	Lawyer and Christian theologian
11	William Cullen Bryant Kemp	United States	1851–1928	Earned degrees at Columbia University for over 60 years
10	Domainlor Javier Cabading	United States	1987–present	Filipino-American actress, advanced practice nurse, and TV personality.
10	Jacob Appel	United States	1973–present	Holds both a Doctor of Medicine and a Juris Doctor. Serves on the faculty of the Icahn School of Medicine at Mount Sinai in New York City.
10	Woody Clermont	United States	1970– present	Haitian American County Court Judge and Author

== Extended continuous enrollment ==
- Milton De Jesús has been a student at the University of Puerto Rico since 1963. In 2010, De Jesús was interviewed by the newspaper, since he was the only student on the campus who could compare the 2010 student strikes and the 1970s, 1980s, 1990s, and 2005 strikes.
- 51 years: Kaija Hammar has been a student at the University of Jyväskylä since 1974, and was still studying there in 2025. She has accumulated over 3,500 ECTS-credits, equivalent to the span of over eleven bachelor's or master's degrees in Finland. She has completed a bachelor's degree in political sciences and a bachelor's degree in adult education.
- 39 years: Paul Cousins worked on a PhD at Columbia University from 1927 until he completed the degree in 1966.
- 12 years: Johnny Lechner began college in 1994 and was still enrolled at the University of Wisconsin–Whitewater in 2009. In 2006, The Badger Herald described him as a 29-year-old student preparing to graduate after 12 years of college.
