= List of Omicron Delta Epsilon chapters =

Omicron Delta Epsilon is an international honor society for the field of economics. It was established on January 1, 1963 with the merger of Omicron Delta Gamma and Omicron Chi Epsilon. Omicron Delta Gamma was established in 1915 at the University of Wisconsin and had 28 chapters in Midwestern and Pacific states. Omicron Chi Epsilon was founded in 1955 at City College of New York and had 28 chapters in Texas and along the East Coast .

In the following Omicron Delta Epsilon chapter list, active chapters are indicated in bold and inactive chapters and Institutions are in italics.

Chapter	Charter date and range	Institution	Location	Status	Ref.
Alabama Alpha		Auburn University	Auburn, Alabama	Inactive	
Alabama Beta		University of Alabama	Tuscaloosa, Alabama	Inactive	
Alabama Gamma		University of Alabama at Birmingham	Birmingham, Alabama	Inactive	
Alabama Delta		University of Alabama in Huntsville	Huntsville, Alabama	Inactive	
Alabama Epsilon		University of North Alabama	Florence, Alabama	Inactive	
**Alabama Zeta**		Auburn University at Montgomery	Montgomery, Alabama	Active	
Alabama Eta		Alabama A&M University	Normal, Alabama	Inactive	
Alabama Theta		Spring Hill College	Mobile, Alabama	Inactive	
**Alabama Iota**		Troy University	Troy, Alabama	Active	
**Alabama Kappa**		Jacksonville State University	Jacksonville, Alabama	Active	
Alabama Lambda		University of South Alabama	Mobile, Alabama	Inactive	
**Alabama Mu**		Samford University	Homewood, Alabama	Active	
Alabama Nu		Birmingham–Southern College	Birmingham, Alabama	Inactive	(Note: The college closed in 2024.)
**Alabama Xi**		University of Mobile	Mobile, Alabama	Active	
Alaska Alpha		University of Alaska Fairbanks	Fairbanks, Alaska	Inactive	
**Alaska Beta**		University of Alaska Anchorage	Anchorage, Alaska	Active	
Arizona Alpha		Arizona State University	Tempe, Arizona	Inactive	
Arizona Beta		University of Arizona	Tucson, Arizona	Inactive	
**Arizona Gamma**		Northern Arizona University	Flagstaff, Arizona	Active	
**Arkansas Alpha**		Arkansas State University	Jonesboro, Arkansas	Active	
**Arkansas Beta**		University of Arkansas	Fayetteville, Arkansas	Active	
Arkansas Gamma		Lyon College	Batesville, Arkansas	Inactive	
Australia Alpha		University of Western Australia	Crawley, Western Australia, Australia	Inactive	
Australia Beta		Macquarie University	Sydney, Australia	Inactive	
Australia Gamma		New South Wales Institute of Technology	Sydney, Australia	Inactive	
Bulgaria Alpha		American University in Bulgaria	Blagoevgrad, Blagoevgrad Province, Bulgaria	Inactive	
**California Alpha**		University of Southern California	Los Angeles, California	Active	
**California Beta**		California State University, Fresno	Fresno, California	Active	
California Gamma		San Diego State University	San Diego, California	Inactive	
**California Delta**		University of California, Berkeley	Berkeley, California	Active	
**California Epsilon**		Occidental College	Los Angeles, California	Active	
**California Zeta**		San Jose State University	San Jose, California	Active	
**California Eta**		California State University, Los Angeles	Los Angeles, California	Active	
California Theta		University of California, Los Angeles	Los Angeles, California	Inactive	
**California Iota**		California State University, Sacramento	Sacramento, California	Active	
**California Kappa**		California State University, Fullerton	Fullerton, California	Active	
**California Lambda**		University of California, Riverside	Riverside, California	Active	
**California Mu**		Claremont McKenna College	Claremont, California	Active	
California Nu		California State University, Hayward	Hayward, California	Inactive	
**California Xi**		Claremont Graduate University	Claremont, California	Active	
**California Omicron**		University of California, Davis	Davis, California	Active	
California Pi		University of California, Santa Barbara	Santa Barbara County, California	Inactive	
California Rho		California State University, Chico	Chico, California	Inactive	
California Sigma		California State University, Northridge	Los Angeles, California	Inactive	
**California Tau**		California State University, Long Beach	Long Beach, California	Active	
**California Upsilon**		University of Redlands	Redlands, California	Active	
**California Phi**		University of the Pacific	Stockton, California	Active	
California Chi		California Institute of Technology	Pasadena, California	Inactive	
**California Psi**		Stanford University	Stanford, California	Active	
**California Omega**		University of San Diego	San Diego, California	Active	
California Alpha Alpha				Unassigned	
**California Alpha Beta**		California State Polytechnic University, Pomona	Pomona, California	Active	
**California Alpha Gamma**		Pepperdine University	Los Angeles County, California	Active	
**California Alpha Delta**		California State University, San Bernardino	San Bernardino, California	Active	
**California Alpha Epsilon**		Saint Mary's College of California	Moraga, California	Active	
California Alpha Zeta		Mills College	Oakland, California	Inactive	
**California Alpha Eta**		Whittier College	Whittier, California	Active	
**California Alpha Theta**		California State University, Bakersfield	Bakersfield, California	Active	
California Alpha Iota		California Polytechnic State University, San Luis Obispo	San Luis Obispo, California	Inactive	
**California Alpha Kappa**		Loyola Marymount University	Los Angeles, California	Active	
California Alpha Lambda		Golden Gate University	San Francisco, California	Inactive	
California Alpha Mu		Sonoma State University	Rohnert Park, California	Inactive	
**California Alpha Nu**		California State University, San Marcos	San Marcos, California	Active	
**California Alpha Xi**		Pitzer College	Claremont, California	Active	
California Alpha Omicron		University of California, Irvine	Irvine, California	Inactive	
**California Alpha Pi**		Westmont College	Montecito, California	Active	
**California Alpha Rho**		California State University, Stanislaus	Turlock, California	Active	
California Alpha Sigma		University of California, San Diego	San Diego, California	Inactive	
**California Alpha Tau**		University of La Verne	La Verne, California	Active	
**California Alpha Upsilon**		Scripps College	Claremont, California	Active	
**California Alpha Phi**		University of California, Merced	Merced, California	Active	
**California Alpha Chi**		University of San Francisco	San Francisco, California	Active	
**California Alpha Psi**		Chapman University	Orange, California	Active	
Canada Alpha		University of Waterloo	Waterloo, Ontario, Canada	Inactive	(Note: Chapter was previously called Ontario Alpha.)
Canada Beta		University of Windsor	Windsor, Ontario, Canada	Inactive	(Note: Chapter was previously called Ontario Beta.)
Canada Gamma		McGill University	Montreal, Quebec, Canada	Inactive	(Note: Chapter was previously called Quebec Gamma.)
Canada Delta		Simon Fraser University	Burnaby, British Columbia, Canada	Inactive	(Note: Chapter was previously called British Columbia Alpha.)
Colorado Alpha		United States Air Force Academy	El Paso County, Colorado	Inactive	
Colorado Beta		University of Colorado Boulder	Boulder, Colorado	Inactive	
Colorado Gamma		University of Southern Colorado	Pueblo, Colorado	Inactive	
**Colorado Delta**		Colorado State University	Fort Collins, Colorado	Active	
Colorado Epsilon		Metropolitan State University of Denver	Denver, Colorado	Inactive	
**Colorado Zeta**		University of Northern Colorado	Greeley, Colorado	Active	
**Colorado Eta**		University of Denver	Denver, Colorado	Active	(Note: Chartered as part of Omicron Delta Gamma in 1916, inactive at merger)
Colorado Theta		University of Colorado Boulder	Boulder, Colorado	Inactive	
Colorado Iota		Colorado School of Mines	Golden, Colorado	Inactive	
Colorado Kappa		University of Colorado Colorado Springs	Colorado Springs, Colorado	Inactive	
**Connecticut Alpha**		University of Connecticut	Storrs, Connecticut	Active	
Connecticut Beta		Yale University	New Haven, Connecticut	Inactive	
Connecticut Gamma		University of Hartford	West Hartford, Connecticut	Inactive	
**Connecticut Delta**		Fairfield University	Fairfield, Connecticut	Active	
**Connecticut Epsilon**		Central Connecticut State University	New Britain, Connecticut	Active	
**Connecticut Zeta**		Eastern Connecticut State University	Willimantic, Connecticut	Active	
Connecticut Theta		Western Connecticut State University	Danbury, Connecticut	Inactive	
**Connecticut Iota**		Wesleyan University	Middletown, Connecticut	Active	
Connecticut Kappa		Trinity College	Hartford, Connecticut	Inactive	
**Connecticut Lambda**		Quinnipiac University	Hamden, Connecticut	Active	
**Delaware Alpha**		University of Delaware	Newark, Delaware	Active	
**Delaware Beta**		Delaware State University	Dover, Delaware	Active	
**District of Columbia Alpha**		George Washington University	Washington, D.C.	Active	
**District of Columbia Beta**	1954	Howard University	Washington, D.C.	Active	
**District of Columbia Gamma**		American University	Washington, D.C.	Active	
**District of Columbia Delta**		Georgetown University	Washington, D.C.	Active	
District of Columbia Epsilon		University of the District of Columbia	Washington, D.C.	Inactive	
**District of Columbia Zeta**		Catholic University of America	Washington, D.C.	Active	
Egypt Alpha	19xx ?–1986	American University in Cairo	New Cairo, Egypt	Inactive	
Florida Alpha		University of Miami	Coral Gables, Florida	Inactive	
**Florida Beta**		University of Tampa	Tampa, Florida	Active	
Florida Gamma		Florida State University	Tallahassee, Florida	Inactive	
**Florida Delta**		University of Florida	Gainesville, Florida	Active	
Florida Epsilon		Florida Atlantic University	Boca Raton, Florida	Inactive	
Florida Zeta		Rollins College	Winter Park, Florida	Inactive	
Florida Eta		Florida Southern College	Lakeland, Florida	Inactive	
**Florida Theta**		University of North Florida	Jacksonville, Florida	Active	
Florida Iota		University of Central Florida	Orlando, Florida	Inactive	
**Florida Kappa**		Rollins College	Winter Park, Florida	Active	
**Florida Lambda**		Eckerd College	St. Petersburg, Florida	Active	
**Florida Mu**		University of South Florida	Tampa, Florida	Active	
**Florida Nu**		Florida International University	Westchester, Florida	Active	
**Florida Xi**		Stetson University	DeLand, Florida	Active	
Florida Omicron		University of West Florida	Pensacola, Florida	Inactive	
**Florida Pi**		University of South Florida St. Petersburg	St. Petersburg, Florida	Active	
Florida Rho		Florida A&M University	Tallahassee, Florida	Inactive	
**Florida Sigma**		Ave Maria University	Ave Maria, Florida	Active	
Florida Tau		Jacksonville University	Jacksonville, Florida	Inactive	
**Florida Upsilon**		Florida Gulf Coast University	Fort Myers, Florida	Active	
**Florida Phi**		Flagler College	St. Augustine, Florida	Active	
**Florida Chi**		Saint Leo University	St. Leo, Florida	Active	
France Alpha		American University of Paris	Paris, France	Inactive	
Georgia Alpha		University of Georgia	Athens, Georgia	Inactive	
**Georgia Beta**		Georgia State University	Atlanta, Georgia	Active	
**Georgia Gamma**		Georgia Southern University	Statesboro, Georgia	Active	
**Georgia Delta**	1977	University of West Georgia	Carrollton, Georgia	Active	
**Georgia Epsilon**		Spelman College	Atlanta, Georgia	Active	
**Georgia Zeta**		Emory University	Atlanta, Georgia	Active	
**Georgia Eta**		Berry College	Mount Berry, Georgia	Active	
Georgia Theta		LaGrange College	LaGrange, Georgia	Inactive	
**Georgia Iota**		Morehouse College	Atlanta, Georgia	Active	
**Georgia Kappa**		Georgia Tech	Atlanta, Georgia	Active	
**Georgia Lambda**		Kennesaw State University	Cobb County, Georgia	Active	
**Georgia Mu**		Agnes Scott College	Decatur, Georgia	Active	
**Georgia Nu**		Georgia College & State University	Milledgeville, Georgia	Active	
**Georgia Xi**		Mercer University	Macon, Georgia	Active	
**Georgia Omicron**		Wesleyan College	Macon, Georgia	Active	
**Georgia Pi**		Covenant College	Lookout Mountain, Georgia	Active	
Georgia Rho		Armstrong Atlantic State University	Savannah, Georgia	Inactive	
**Georgia Sigma**		Oglethorpe University	Brookhaven, Georgia	Active	
**Georgia Tau**		Georgia Gwinnett College	Lawrenceville, Georgia	Active	
**Georgia Upsilon**		Young Harris College	Young Harris, Georgia	Active	
**Guam Alpha**		University of Guam	Mangilao, Guam	Active	
**Hawaii Alpha**		University of Hawaiʻi at Mānoa	Honolulu, Hawaii	Active	
**Hawaii Beta**		University of Hawaiʻi at West Oʻahu	Kapolei, Hawaii	Active	
Idaho Alpha		Idaho State University	Pocatello, Idaho	Inactive	
**Idaho Beta**		Boise State University	Boise, Idaho	Active	
Idaho Gamma		University of Idaho	Moscow, Idaho	Inactive	
**Idaho Delta**		Northwest Nazarene University	Nampa, Idaho	Active	
**Illinois Alpha**		University of Illinois Urbana-Champaign	Urbana, Illinois	Active	
Illinois Beta		Southern Illinois University Edwardsville	Edwardsville, Illinois	Inactive	
**Illinois Gamma**		Bradley University	Peoria, Illinois	Active	
**Illinois Delta**		Northern Illinois University	DeKalb, Illinois	Active	
Illinois Epsilon		Western Illinois University	Macomb, Illinois	Inactive	
Illinois Zeta		University of Illinois Chicago	Chicago, Illinois	Inactive	
**Illinois Eta**		University of Chicago	Chicago, Illinois	Active	
**Illinois Theta**		Illinois State University	Normal, Illinois	Active	
**Illinois Kappa**		Eastern Illinois University	Charleston, Illinois	Active	
Illinois Lambda		Loyola University Chicago	Chicago, Illinois	Inactive	
Illinois Mu		Wheaton College	Wheaton, Illinois	Inactive	
Illinois Nu		Rockford College	Rockford, Illinois	Inactive	
Illinois Xi		Northwestern University	Evanston, Illinois	Inactive	
Illinois Omicron		MacMurray College	Jacksonville, Illinois	Inactive	(Note: The college closed in 2020.)
**Illinois Pi**		DePaul University	Chicago, Illinois	Active	
**Illinois Rho**		Lake Forest College	Lake Forest, Illinois	Active	
**Illinois Sigma**		Northeastern Illinois University	Chicago, Illinois	Active	
**Illinois Tau**		Illinois College	Jacksonville, Illinois	Active	
Illinois Upsilon		University of Illinois at Springfield	Springfield, Illinois	Inactive	(Note: Chapter formed at Sangamon State University, which became the University of Illinois at Springfield in 1995.)
**Illinois Phi**		Illinois Wesleyan University	Bloomington, Illinois	Active	
Illinois Chi		Southern Illinois University Edwardsville	Edwardsville, Illinois	Inactive	
**Illinois Psi**		North Central College	Naperville, Illinois	Active	
Illinois Omega		Roosevelt University	Chicago, Illinois	Inactive	
**Illinois Alpha Beta**		Southern Illinois University Carbondale	Carbondale, Illinois	Active	
Illinois Alpha Gamma		Knox College	Galesburg, Illinois	Inactive	
**Indiana Alpha**		DePauw University	Greencastle, Indiana	Active	
**Indiana Beta**		University of Notre Dame	Notre Dame, Indiana	Active	
**Indiana Gamma**		Indiana University Bloomington	Bloomington, Indiana	Active	
**Indiana Delta**		Valparaiso University	Valparaiso, Indiana	Active	
Indiana Epsilon		Butler University	Indianapolis, Indiana	Inactive	
**Indiana Zeta**		Ball State University	Muncie, Indiana	Active	
**Indiana Eta**		Indiana State University	Terre Haute, Indiana	Active	
**Indiana Theta**		Indiana University South Bend	South Bend, Indiana	Active	
Indiana Iota		Indiana University Northwest	Gary, Indiana	Inactive	
**Indiana Kappa**		Wabash College	Crawfordsville, Indiana	Active	
**Indiana Lambda**		University of Southern Indiana	Evansville, Indiana	Active	
**Indiana Mu**		Purdue University	West Lafayette, Indiana	Active	
Indiana Nu		Manchester College	North Manchester, Indiana	Inactive	
**Indiana Xi**		Purdue University Fort Wayne	Fort Wayne, Indiana	Active	
Iowa Alpha		University of Iowa	Iowa City, Iowa	Inactive	(Note: Chartered as part of Omicron Delta Gamma in 1917)
**Iowa Beta**		Luther College	Decorah, Iowa	Active	
**Iowa Gamma**		Iowa State University	Ames, Iowa	Active	
**Iowa Delta**		Drake University	Des Moines, Iowa	Active	
Iowa Epsilon		Coe College	Cedar Rapids, Iowa	Inactive	
Iowa Zeta		University of Northern Iowa	Cedar Falls, Iowa	Inactive	
Iowa Eta		Loras College	Dubuque, Iowa	Inactive	
Iowa Theta		Central College	Pella, Iowa	Inactive	
**Iowa Iota**		Cornell College	Mount Vernon, Iowa	Active	
Iowa Kappa		Morningside College	Sioux City, Iowa	Inactive	
**Iowa Lambda**		Graceland University	Lamoni, Iowa	Active	
**Kansas Alpha**		Wichita State University	Wichita, Kansas	Active	
**Kansas Beta**		Kansas State University	Manhattan, Kansas	Active	
Kansas Gamma		Benedictine College	Atchison, Kansas	Inactive	
**Kansas Delta**	January 19, 1976	Pittsburg State University	Pittsburg, Kansas	Active	
Kansas Epsilon		Washburn University	Topeka, Kansas	Inactive	
Kansas Zeta		Fort Hays State University	Hays, Kansas	Inactive	
**Kansas Eta**		Baker University	Baldwin City, Kansas	Active	
Kazakhstan Alpha		Kazakhstan Institute of Management, Economics and Strategic Research	Almaty, Kazakhstan	Inactive	
**Kentucky Alpha**		University of Kentucky	Lexington, Kentucky	Active	
**Kentucky Beta**		Berea College	Berea, Kentucky	Active	
**Kentucky Gamma**		Centre College	Danville, Kentucky	Active	
**Kentucky Delta**		Transylvania University	Lexington, Kentucky	Active	
**Kentucky Epsilon**		Western Kentucky University	Bowling Green, Kentucky	Active	
Kentucky Zeta		Eastern Kentucky University	Richmond, Kentucky	Inactive	
**Kentucky Eta**		Bellarmine University	Louisville, Kentucky	Active	
Kentucky Theta		Morehead State University	Morehead, Kentucky	Inactive	
Kentucky Iota		Georgetown College	Georgetown, Kentucky	Inactive	
Kentucky Kappa		Murray State University	Murray, Kentucky	Inactive	
**Louisiana Alpha**		Tulane University	New Orleans, Louisiana	Active	
Louisiana Beta		University of Louisiana at Lafayette	Lafayette, Louisiana	Inactive	(Note: Chapter formed at the University of Southwestern Louisiana, which became the University of Louisiana at Lafayette in 1998.)
**Louisiana Gamma**		Louisiana State University	Baton Rouge, Louisiana	Active	
**Louisiana Delta**		Louisiana Tech University	Ruston, Louisiana	Active	
Louisiana Epsilon		University of New Orleans	New Orleans, Louisiana	Inactive	
Louisiana Zeta		University of Louisiana at Monroe	Monroe, Louisiana	Inactive	(Note: Chapter formed from Northeast Louisiana University, which became the University of Louisiana at Monroe in 1999.)
Louisiana Eta		Southeastern Louisiana University	Hammond, Louisiana	Inactive	
Louisiana Theta		Xavier University of Louisiana	New Orleans, Louisiana	Inactive	
Louisiana Iota		Louisiana State University Shreveport	Shreveport, Louisiana	Inactive	
Louisiana Kappa		McNeese State University	Lake Charles, Louisiana	Inactive	
**Louisiana Lambda**		Centenary College of Louisiana	Shreveport, Louisiana	Active	
**Louisiana Mu**		Loyola University New Orleans	New Orleans, Louisiana	Active	
**Maine Alpha**		University of Maine	Orono, Maine	Active	
Maine Beta		University of Southern Maine	Portland, Maine	Inactive	
Maryland Alpha		University of Maryland, College Park	College Park, Maryland	Inactive	
**Maryland Beta**		McDaniel College	Westminster, Maryland	Active	
**Maryland Gamma**		Loyola University Maryland	Baltimore, Maryland	Active	
**Maryland Delta**		United States Naval Academy	Annapolis, Maryland	Active	
**Maryland Epsilon**		University of Maryland, Baltimore	Baltimore, Maryland	Active	
**Maryland Zeta**		Johns Hopkins University	Baltimore, Maryland	Active	
**Maryland Eta**		Hood College	Frederick, Maryland	Active	
Maryland Theta	19xx ?–1980	Frostburg State University	Frostburg, Maryland	Inactive	
Maryland Iota		Morgan State University	Baltimore, Maryland	Inactive	
**Maryland Kappa**		St. Mary's College of Maryland	St. Mary's City, Maryland	Active	
**Maryland Lambda**	1999	Towson University	Towson, Maryland	Active	
**Maryland Mu**		Washington College	Chestertown, Maryland	Active	
**Maryland Xi**		Salisbury University	Salisbury, Maryland	Active	
**Maryland Omicron**		Goucher College	Towson, Maryland	Active	
**Maryland Pi**		Bowie State University	Prince George's County, Maryland	Active	
**Maryland Rho**		Mount St. Mary's University	Emmitsburg, Maryland	Active	
Massachusetts Alpha		Harvard University	Cambridge, Massachusetts	Inactive	(Note: Chartered as part of Omicron Delta Gamma in 1915)
Massachusetts Beta		Tufts University	Medford, Massachusetts	Inactive	
**Massachusetts Gamma**		Boston College	Boston, Massachusetts	Active	
**Massachusetts Delta**		Brandeis University	Waltham, Massachusetts	Active	
**Massachusetts Epsilon**		Boston University	Boston, Massachusetts	Active	
**Massachusetts Zeta**		College of the Holy Cross	Worcester, Massachusetts	Active	
**Massachusetts Eta**		Clark University	Worcester, Massachusetts	Active	
Massachusetts Theta		American International College	Springfield, Massachusetts	Inactive	
**Massachusetts Iota**		Northeastern University	Boston, Massachusetts	Active	
Massachusetts Kappa		Nichols College	Dudley, Massachusetts	Inactive	
Massachusetts Lambda		Regis College	Weston, Massachusetts	Inactive	
**Massachusetts Mu**		Worcester State University	Worcester, Massachusetts	Active	
Massachusetts Nu	19xx ?–1982	Boston State College	Boston, Massachusetts	Consolidated	(Note: In 1982, the college merged with the University of Massachusetts Boston, home to the Massachusetts Sigma chapter.)
**Massachusetts Xi**		Framingham State University	Framingham, Massachusetts	Active	
**Massachusetts Omicron**		Wheaton College	Norton, Massachusetts	Active	
**Massachusetts Pi**		Bentley University	Waltham, Massachusetts	Active	
Massachusetts Rho		Mount Holyoke College	South Hadley, Massachusetts	Inactive	
**Massachusetts Sigma**		University of Massachusetts Boston	Boston, Massachusetts	Active	
**Massachusetts Tau**	1981	Babson College	Wellesley, Massachusetts	Active	
Massachusetts Upsilon		Gordon College	Wenham, Massachusetts	Inactive	
**Massachusetts Phi**		Stonehill College	Easton, Massachusetts	Active	
**Massachusetts Chi**		Suffolk University	Boston, Massachusetts	Active	
**Massachusetts Psi**		Fitchburg State College	Fitchburg, Massachusetts	Active	
**Massachusetts Omega**		Merrimack College	North Andover, Massachusetts	Active	
**Massachusetts Alpha Alpha**		University of Massachusetts Amherst	Amherst, Massachusetts	Active	
**Massachusetts Alpha Beta**		Assumption University	Worcester, Massachusetts	Active	
Massachusetts Alpha Gamma		Wellesley College	Wellesley, Massachusetts	Inactive	
**Massachusetts Alpha Delta**		Bridgewater State University	Bridgewater, Massachusetts	Active	
**Massachusetts Alpha Epsilon**		University of Massachusetts Dartmouth	Dartmouth, Massachusetts	Active	
**Massachusetts Alpha Zeta**		University of Massachusetts Lowell	Lowell, Massachusetts	Active	
**Massachusetts Alpha Eta**		Westfield State University	Westfield, Massachusetts	Active	
**Massachusetts Alpha Theta**		Salem State University	Salem, Massachusetts	Active	
Massachusetts Alpha Iota				Unassigned ?	
Massachusetts Alpha Kappa				Unassigned ?	
Massachusetts Alpha Lambda				Unassigned ?	
Massachusetts Alpha Mu				Unassigned ?	
Massachusetts Alpha Nu				Unassigned ?	
Massachusetts Alpha Xi				Unassigned ?	
Massachusetts Alpha Omicron				Unassigned ?	
Massachusetts Alpha Pi				Unassigned ?	
Massachusetts Alpha Rho				Unassigned ?	
Massachusetts Alpha Sigma				Unassigned ?	
Massachusetts Alpha Tau				Unassigned ?	
Massachusetts Alpha Upsilon				Unassigned ?	
Massachusetts Alpha Phi				Unassigned ?	
Massachusetts Alpha Chi				Unassigned ?	
Massachusetts Alpha Psi		Western New England College	Springfield, Massachusetts	Inactive	
Mexico Alpha		Universidad de las Américas, A.C.	Mexico City, Mexico	Inactive	
**Mexico Beta**		Monterrey Institute of Technology and Higher Education	Monterrey, Nuevo León, Mexico	Active	
**Michigan Alpha**		Northern Michigan University	Marquette, Michigan	Active	
**Michigan Beta**		Albion College	Albion, Michigan	Active	
Michigan Gamma		Michigan State University	East Lansing, Michigan	Inactive	
**Michigan Delta**		Wayne State University	Detroit, Michigan	Active	
Michigan Epsilon		Central Michigan University	Mount Pleasant, Michigan	Inactive	
**Michigan Zeta**		Alma College	Alma, Michigan	Active	
**Michigan Eta**		Eastern Michigan University	Ypsilanti, Michigan	Active	
**Michigan Theta**		Hope College	Holland, Michigan	Active	
**Michigan Iota**		Oakland University	Rochester Hills, Michigan	Active	
**Michigan Kappa**		University of Michigan–Dearborn	Dearborn, Michigan	Active	
Michigan Lambda		Andrews University	Berrien Springs, Michigan	Inactive	
**Michigan Mu**		University of Michigan	Ann Arbor, Michigan	Active	
Michigan Nu		University of Michigan–Flint	Flint, Michigan	Inactive	
Michigan Xi		Aquinas College	Grand Rapids, Michigan	Inactive	
**Michigan Omicron**		Michigan Technological University	Houghton, Michigan	Active	
**Michigan Pi**		Western Michigan University	Kalamazoo, Michigan	Active	
**Michigan Rho**		Grand Valley State University	Allendale, Michigan	Active	
**Michigan Sigma**		Hillsdale College	Hillsdale, Michigan	Active	
Michigan Tau		Calvin College	Grand Rapids, Michigan	Inactive	
**Michigan Upsilon**		Saginaw Valley State University	University Center, Michigan	Active	
**Michigan Phi**		Northwood University	Midland, Michigan	Active	
**Minnesota Alpha**		Macalester College	Saint Paul, Minnesota	Active	
**Minnesota Beta**		St. Olaf College	Northfield, Minnesota	Active	
Minnesota Gamma		University of St. Thomas	Saint Paul, Minnesota	Inactive	
**Minnesota Delta**		University of Minnesota Duluth	Duluth, Minnesota	Active	
Minnesota Epsilon		University of Minnesota	Saint Paul, Minnesota	Inactive	
**Minnesota Zeta**		St. Catherine University	Saint Paul, Minnesota	Active	
Minnesota Eta		Gustavus Adolphus College	St. Peter, Minnesota	Inactive	
Minnesota Theta		Saint John's University	Collegeville, Minnesota	Inactive	
Minnesota Iota		St. Cloud State University	St. Cloud, Minnesota	Inactive	
Minnesota Kappa		Minnesota State University, Mankato	Mankato, Minnesota	Inactive	
Minnesota Lambda		Concordia College	Moorhead, Minnesota	Inactive	
Minnesota Mu		College of St. Scholastica	Duluth, Minnesota	Inactive	
**Mississippi Alpha**		University of Southern Mississippi	Hattiesburg, Mississippi	Active	
**Mississippi Beta**		Mississippi State University	Mississippi State, Mississippi	Active	
Mississippi Gamma		University of Mississippi	Lafayette County, Mississippi	Inactive	
**Mississippi Delta**		Millsaps College	Jackson, Mississippi	Active	
Mississippi Epsilon		Jackson State University	Jackson, Mississippi	Inactive	
**Missouri Alpha**	1963	Washington University in St. Louis	St. Louis, Missouri	Active	(Note: Chartered as part of Omicron Delta Gamma in 1915)
**Missouri Beta**	1963	University of Missouri	Columbia, Missouri	Active	
**Missouri Gamma**		University of Central Missouri	Warrensburg, Missouri	Active	
Missouri Delta		University of Missouri–St. Louis	St. Louis, Missouri	Inactive	
**Missouri Epsilon**		Missouri State University	Springfield, Missouri	Active	
Missouri Zeta		University of Missouri–Kansas City	Kansas City, Missouri	Inactive	
Missouri Eta		Park University	Parkville, Missouri	Inactive	
**Missouri Theta**		Missouri Southern State University	Joplin, Missouri	Active	
Missouri Iota		University of Missouri Rolla	Rolla, Missouri	Inactive	
Missouri Kappa		Lincoln University	Jefferson City, Missouri	Inactive	
Missouri Lambda		Northwest Missouri State University	Maryville, Missouri	Inactive	
**Missouri Mu**		Saint Louis University	St. Louis, Missouri	Active	
**Missouri Nu**		Southeast Missouri State University	Cape Girardeau, Missouri	Active	
**Missouri Xi**		Truman State University	Kirksville, Missouri	Active	
**Missouri Omicron**		Missouri Western State University	St. Joseph, Missouri	Active	
**Missouri Pi**		Lindenwood University	St. Charles, Missouri	Active	
Missouri Rho				Unassigned ?	
Missouri Sigma				Unassigned ?	
Missouri Tau				Unassigned ?	
Missouri Upsilon				Unassigned ?	
Missouri Phi				Unassigned ?	
Missouri Chi				Unassigned ?	
**Missouri Psi**		Rockhurst University	Kansas City, Missouri	Active	
Montana Alpha		University of Montana	Missoula, Montana	Inactive	
Montana Beta		Montana State University	Bozeman, Montana	Inactive	
**Nebraska Alpha**		Creighton University	Omaha, Nebraska	Active	
**Nebraska Beta**	1966	University of Nebraska Omaha	Omaha, Nebraska	Active	
**Nebraska Gamma**		University of Nebraska–Lincoln	Lincoln, Nebraska	Active	
**Nebraska Delta**		Nebraska Wesleyan University	Lincoln, Nebraska	Active	
Nebraska Epsilon		University of Nebraska at Kearney	Kearney, Nebraska	Inactive	
Nebraska Zeta		Chadron State College	Chadron, Nebraska	Inactive	
Nebraska Eta		Hastings College	Hastings, Nebraska	Inactive	
**Nebraska Theta**		Doane University	Crete, Nebraska	Active	
**Nevada Alpha**		University of Nevada, Reno	Reno, Nevada	Active	
Nevada Beta		University of Nevada, Las Vegas	Paradise, Nevada	Inactive	
New Hampshire Alpha		Dartmouth College	Hanover, New Hampshire	Inactive	
**New Hampshire Beta**		University of New Hampshire	Durham, New Hampshire	Active	
**New Hampshire Gamma**		Saint Anselm College	Goffstown, New Hampshire	Active	
**New Hampshire Delta**		Keene State College	Keene, New Hampshire	Active	
New Jersey Alpha		Princeton University	Princeton, New Jersey	Inactive	
**New Jersey Beta**		Saint Peter's University	Jersey City, New Jersey	Active	
New Jersey Gamma		Fairleigh Dickinson University, Madsion	Madison, New Jersey	Inactive	
New Jersey Delta		Fairleigh Dickinson University, Rutherford	Rutherford, New Jersey	Inactive	
New Jersey Epsilon		Seton Hall University	South Orange, New Jersey	Inactive	
**New Jersey Zeta**		Rutgers University–Newark	Newark, New Jersey	Active	
**New Jersey Eta**		Rider University	Lawrence Township, New Jersey	Active	
**New Jersey Theta**		Rutgers University–New Brunswick	New Brunswick, New Jersey	Active	
New Jersey Iota		Fairleigh Dickinson University, Teaneck	Teaneck, New Jersey	Inactive	
**New Jersey Kappa**		New Jersey City University	Jersey City, New Jersey	Active	
**New Jersey Lambda**		Rutgers University–Camden	Camden, New Jersey	Active	
New Jersey Mu		Kean University	Union, New Jersey	Inactive	
**New Jersey Nu**		Drew University	Madison, New Jersey	Active	
**New Jersey Xi**		Montclair State University	Montclair, New Jersey	Active	
**New Jersey Omicron**		The College of New Jersey	Ewing Township, New Jersey	Active	
**New Jersey Pi**		William Paterson University	Wayne, New Jersey	Active	
New Jersey Rho		Richard Stockton College of New Jersey	Galloway Township, New Jersey	Inactive	
**New Jersey Sigma**		Ramapo College	Mahwah, New Jersey	Active	
**New Jersey Tau**		Rowan University	Glassboro, New Jersey	Active	
New Jersey Upsilon		New Jersey City University	Jersey City, New Jersey	Inactive	
**New Mexico Alpha**		University of New Mexico	Albuquerque, New Mexico	Active	
New Mexico Beta		New Mexico State University	Las Cruces, New Mexico	Inactive	
**New York Alpha**	1963	City College of New York	New York City	Active	(Note: Chapter formed from Omicron Chi Epsilon, established in 1955.)
**New York Beta**		Manhattan University	New York City	Active	
**New York Gamma**		Fordham University	New York City	Active	
**New York Delta**		Queens College, City University of New York	New York City	Active	
**New York Epsilon**		Hofstra University	Hempstead, New York	Active	
New York Zeta		Columbia University	New York City	Inactive	
**New York Eta**		St. Francis College	Brooklyn, New York	Active	
**New York Theta**		St. John's University	New York City	Active	
**New York Iota**		New York University	New York City	Active	
**New York Kappa**	1961	Cornell University	Ithaca, New York	Active	
**New York Lambda**		Syracuse University	Syracuse, New York	Active	
**New York Mu**		Colgate University	Hamilton, New York	Active	
**New York Nu**		Iona University	New Rochelle, New York	Active	
**New York Xi**		Stony Brook University	Stony Brook, New York	Active	
New York Omicron		Dowling College	Oakdale, New York	Inactive	(Note: The college closed in 2016.)
**New York Pi**		Lehman College	Bronx, New York	Active	
New York Rho		State University of New York at Geneseo	Geneseo, New York	Inactive	
New York Sigma		Long Island University	New York City	Inactive	
**New York Tau**	1976	State University of New York at Fredonia	Fredonia, New York	Active	
New York Upsilon		Rensselaer Polytechnic Institute	Troy, New York	Inactive	
**New York Phi**		State University of New York at Oswego	Oswego, New York	Active	
**New York Chi**		St. Lawrence University	Canton, New York	Active	
**New York Psi**		State University of New York at Potsdam	Potsdam, New York	Active	
**New York Omega**		University of Rochester	Rochester, New York	Active	
New York Alpha Alpha				Unassigned	
**New York Alpha Beta**		Union College	Schenectady, New York	Active	
**New York Alpha Gamma**		University at Buffalo	Buffalo, New York	Active	
New York Alpha Delta		Russell Sage College	Troy, New York	Inactive	
**New York Alpha Epsilon**		University at Albany, SUNY	Albany, New York	Active	
**New York Alpha Zeta**		Skidmore College	Saratoga Springs, New York	Active	
**New York Alpha Eta**		Vassar College	Poughkeepsie, New York	Active	
**New York Alpha Theta**		Buffalo State University	Buffalo, New York	Active	
New York Alpha Iota		Hunter College	New York City	Inactive	
New York Alpha Kappa		State University of New York at Binghamton	Binghamton, New York	Inactive	
**New York Alpha Lambda**	1975	State University of New York at Oneonta	Oneonta, New York	Active	
**New York Alpha Mu**		Hartwick College	Oneonta, New York	Active	
**New York Alpha Nu**		State University of New York at Cortland	Cortland, New York	Active	
**New York Alpha Xi**		Hobart and William Smith Colleges	Geneva, New York	Active	
New York Alpha Omicron		St. John Fisher University	Pittsford, New York	Inactive	
**New York Alpha Pi**		University of Mount Saint Vincent	New York City	Active	
**New York Alpha Rho**		Pace University	New York City	Active	
**New York Alpha Sigma**		State University of New York at Plattsburgh	Plattsburgh, New York	Active	
**New York Alpha Tau**		Rochester Institute of Technology	Rochester, New York	Active	
**New York Alpha Upsilon**		Ithaca College	Ithaca, New York	Active	
New York Alpha Phi		Yeshiva University	New York City	Inactive	
New York Alpha Chi		Adelphi University	Garden City, New York	Inactive	
New York Alpha Psi		Touro College	New York City	Inactive	
**New York Alpha Omega**		Le Moyne College	DeWitt, New York	Active	
New York Beta Alpha		St. Bonaventure University	St. Bonaventure, New York	Inactive	
New York Beta Beta		Utica College	Utica, New York	Inactive	
**New York Beta Gamma**		LIU Post	Brookville, New York	Active	
New York Beta Delta		New York Institute of Technology	New York City	Inactive	
**New York Beta Epsilon**		Niagara University	Lewiston, New York	Active	
New York Beta Zeta		Baruch College	New York City	Inactive	
New York Beta Eta		SUNY Brockport	Brockport, New York	Inactive	
**New York Beta Theta**		Hamilton College	Clinton, New York	Active	
**New York Beta Iota**		Nazareth University	Pittsford, New York	Active	(Note: Chapter formed at Nazareth College of Rochester, now Nazareth University.)
New York Beta Kappa		Pace University – Pleasantville	Pleasantville, New York	Inactive	
New York Beta Lambda		Canisius College	Buffalo, New York	Inactive	
**New York Beta Mu**		College of Staten Island	Staten Island, New York	Active	
**New York Beta Nu**		Siena College	Loudonville, New York	Active	
New York Beta Xi		United States Military Academy	West Point, New York	Inactive	
New York Beta Omicron		Bard College	Annandale-on-Hudson, New York	Inactive	
New York Beta Pi		Wagner College	Staten Island, New York	Inactive	
**New York Beta Rho**		Elmira College	Elmira, New York	Active	
**New York Beta Sigma**		Alfred University	Alfred, New York	Active	
**New York Beta Tau**		Marist University	Poughkeepsie, New York	Active	
**New York Beta Upsilon**		State University of New York at New Paltz	New Paltz, New York	Active	
**New York Beta Phi**		John Jay College of Criminal Justice	New York City	Active	
**New York Beta Chi**		Clarkson University	Potsdam, New York	Active	
**New York Beta Psi**		Farmingdale State College	East Farmingdale, New York	Active	
**New York Beta Omega**		College of Saint Rose	Albany, New York	Active	
**New York Gamma Alpha**		Brooklyn College	Brooklyn, New York City	Active	
**North Carolina Alpha**		North Carolina A&T State University	Greensboro, North Carolina	Active	
**North Carolina Beta**	1966	Davidson College	Davidson, North Carolina	Active	
**North Carolina Gamma**		North Carolina State University	Raleigh, North Carolina	Active	
**North Carolina Delta**		University of North Carolina at Chapel Hill	Chapel Hill, North Carolina	Active	
**North Carolina Epsilon**		University of North Carolina at Asheville	Asheville, North Carolina	Active	
**North Carolina Zeta**		East Carolina University	Greenville, North Carolina	Active	
**North Carolina Eta**		Wake Forest University	Winston-Salem, North Carolina	Active	
**North Carolina Theta**		University of North Carolina at Charlotte	Charlotte, North Carolina	Active	
**North Carolina Iota**		University of North Carolina at Greensboro	Greensboro, North Carolina	Active	
**North Carolina Kappa**		Appalachian State University	Boone, North Carolina	Active	
**North Carolina Lambda**		Western Carolina University	Cullowhee, North Carolina	Active	
North Carolina Mu		St. Andrews Presbyterian College	Laurinburg, North Carolina	Inactive	
North Carolina Nu		Fayetteville State University	Fayetteville, North Carolina	Inactive	
North Carolina Xi		Duke University	Durham, North Carolina	Inactive	
**North Carolina Omicron**		Lenoir–Rhyne University	Hickory, North Carolina	Active	
**North Carolina Pi**		Elon University	Elon, North Carolina	Active	
**North Carolina Rho**		University of North Carolina Wilmington	Wilmington, North Carolina	Active	
North Carolina Sigma		Salem College	Winston-Salem, North Carolina	Inactive	
**North Carolina Tau**		Campbell University	Buies Creek, North Carolina	Active	
North Carolina Upsilon		Winston-Salem State University	Winston-Salem, North Carolina	Inactive	
**North Carolina Phi**		Meredith College	Raleigh, North Carolina	Active	
**North Carolina Chi**		University of North Carolina at Pembroke	Pembroke, North Carolina	Active	
**North Carolina Psi**		Catawba College	Salisbury, North Carolina	Active	
North Dakota Alpha		University of North Dakota	Grand Forks, North Dakota	Inactive	
North Dakota Beta		North Dakota State University	Fargo, North Dakota	Inactive	
**Ohio Alpha**		Muskingum University	New Concord, Ohio	Active	
Ohio Beta		Miami University	Oxford, Ohio	Inactive	
Ohio Gamma		Kent State University	Kent, Ohio	Inactive	
**Ohio Delta**		Ohio State University	Columbus, Ohio	Active	
**Ohio Epsilon**		John Carroll University	University Heights, Ohio	Active	
Ohio Zeta		Case Western Reserve University	Cleveland, Ohio	Inactive	
Ohio Eta		University of Cincinnati	Cincinnati, Ohio	Inactive	
**Ohio Theta**		Youngstown State University	Youngstown, Ohio	Active	
Ohio Iota		University of Akron	Akron, Ohio	Inactive	
**Ohio Kappa**		Denison University	Granville, Ohio	Active	
**Ohio Lambda**		Bowling Green State University	Bowling Green, Ohio	Active	
**Ohio Mu**		Ohio Wesleyan University	Delaware, Ohio	Active	
Ohio Nu		Kenyon College	Gambier, Ohio	Inactive	
Ohio Xi		University of Toledo	Toledo, Ohio	Inactive	
**Ohio Omicron**		Xavier University	Cincinnati, Ohio	Active	
Ohio Pi		Otterbein College	Westerville, Ohio	Inactive	
**Ohio Rho**		Marietta College	Marietta, Ohio	Active	
Ohio Sigma		Ohio University	Athens, Ohio	Inactive	
**Ohio Tau**		University of Dayton	Dayton, Ohio	Active	
**Ohio Upsilon**		Ohio Northern University	Ada, Ohio	Active	
**Ohio Phi**		Ashland University	Ashland, Ohio	Active	
Ohio Chi		Cleveland State University	Cleveland, Ohio	Inactive	
Ohio Psi		Mount Union College	Alliance, Ohio	Inactive	
Ohio Omega		Hiram College	Hiram, Ohio	Inactive	
Ohio Alpha Alpha				Unassigned	
**Ohio Alpha Beta**		Baldwin Wallace University	Berea, Ohio	Active	
**Ohio Alpha Gamma**		College of Wooster	Wooster, Ohio	Active	
**Ohio Alpha Delta**		Wright State University	Fairborn, Ohio	Active	
**Ohio Alpha Epsilon**		Wittenberg University	Springfield, Ohio	Active	
Ohio Alpha Zeta		Wilmington College	Wilmington, Ohio	Inactive	
Ohio Alpha Eta		Capital University	Bexley, Ohio	Inactive	
**Ohio Alpha Theta**		Oberlin College	Oberlin, Ohio	Active	
**Oklahoma Alpha**		University of Oklahoma	Norman, Oklahoma	Active	
**Oklahoma Beta**		Oklahoma State University	Stillwater, Oklahoma	Active	
Oklahoma Gamma		University of Central Oklahoma	Edmond, Oklahoma	Inactive	
**Oklahoma Delta**		University of Tulsa	Tulsa, Oklahoma	Active	
Oklahoma Epsilon		Oklahoma City University	Oklahoma City, Oklahoma	Inactive	
**Oregon Alpha**		Southern Oregon University	Ashland, Oregon	Active	
**Oregon Beta**		Linfield University	McMinnville, Oregon	Active	
**Oregon Gamma**		Oregon State University	Corvallis, Oregon	Active	
Oregon Delta		Willamette University	Salem, Oregon	Inactive	
**Oregon Epsilon**		Western Oregon University	Monmouth, Oregon	Active	
Oregon Zeta		University of Portland	Portland, Oregon	Inactive	
Oregon Eta		Portland State University	Portland, Oregon	Inactive	
Oregon Theta		University of Oregon	Eugene, Oregon	Inactive	
**Oregon Iota**		Eastern Oregon University	La Grande, Oregon	Active	
**Pennsylvania Alpha**		University of Pittsburgh	Pittsburgh, Pennsylvania	Active	
Pennsylvania Beta		Pennsylvania State University	State College, Pennsylvania	Inactive	
Pennsylvania Gamma		University of Pennsylvania	Philadelphia, Pennsylvania	Inactive	
**Pennsylvania Delta**		Lehigh University	Bethlehem, Pennsylvania	Active	
**Pennsylvania Epsilon**		Duquesne University	Pittsburgh, Pennsylvania	Active	
**Pennsylvania Zeta**		Washington & Jefferson College	Washington, Pennsylvania	Active	
Pennsylvania Eta		Widener University	Chester, Pennsylvania	Inactive	
**Pennsylvania Theta**		Temple University	Philadelphia, Pennsylvania	Active	
**Pennsylvania Iota**		Bucknell University	Lewisburg, Pennsylvania	Active	
**Pennsylvania Kappa**		Franklin & Marshall College	Lancaster, Pennsylvania	Active	
**Pennsylvania Lambda**		Villanova University	Villanova, Pennsylvania	Active	
**Pennsylvania Mu**	1968	Lycoming College	Williamsport, Pennsylvania	Active	
Pennsylvania Nu		Westminster College	New Wilmington, Pennsylvania	Inactive	
**Pennsylvania Xi**	1969	University of Scranton	Scranton, Pennsylvania	Active	
**Pennsylvania Omicron**		Carnegie Mellon University	Pittsburgh, Pennsylvania	Active	
Pennsylvania Pi		Gannon University	Erie, Pennsylvania	Inactive	
**Pennsylvania Rho**		Ursinus College	Collegeville, Pennsylvania	Active	
Pennsylvania Sigma		Albright College	Reading, Pennsylvania	Inactive	
**Pennsylvania Tau**		Commonwealth University-Bloomsburg	Bloomsburg, Pennsylvania	Active	
Pennsylvania Upsilon		Lincoln University	Chester County, Pennsylvania	Inactive	
Pennsylvania Psi		Waynesburg College	Waynesburg, Pennsylvania	Inactive	
**Pennsylvania Phi**		La Salle University	Philadelphia, Pennsylvania	Active	
**Pennsylvania Chi**		Pennsylvania Western University, California	California, Pennsylvania	Active	
**Pennsylvania Omega**		Clarion University of Pennsylvania, Pennsylvania Western University	Clarion, Pennsylvania	Active	(Note: Chapter formed at Clarion University of Pennsylvania, which merged to create Pennsylvania Western University in 2022.)
Pennsylvania Alpha Alpha				Unassigned	
Pennsylvania Alpha Beta		Wilkes University	Wilkes-Barre, Pennsylvania	Inactive	
**Pennsylvania Alpha Gamma**		Indiana University of Pennsylvania	Indiana, Pennsylvania	Active	
**Pennsylvania Alpha Delta**		Lafayette College	Easton, Pennsylvania	Active	
**Pennsylvania Alpha Epsilon**		West Chester University	West Chester, Pennsylvania	Active	
Pennsylvania Alpha Zeta		Dickinson College	Carlisle, Pennsylvania	Inactive	
**Pennsylvania Alpha Eta**		Muhlenberg College	Allentown, Pennsylvania	Active	
**Pennsylvania Alpha Theta**		Saint Joseph's University	Philadelphia, Pennsylvania	Active	
**Pennsylvania Alpha Iota**		Chatham University	Pittsburgh, Pennsylvania	Active	
**Pennsylvania Alpha Kappa**		Shippensburg University	Shippensburg, Pennsylvania	Active	
**Pennsylvania Alpha Lambda**		Gettysburg College	Gettysburg, Pennsylvania	Active	
**Pennsylvania Alpha Mu**		King's College	Wilkes-Barre, Pennsylvania	Active	
**Pennsylvania Alpha Nu**		Moravian University	Bethlehem, Pennsylvania	Active	
**Pennsylvania Alpha Xi**		East Stroudsburg University of Pennsylvania	East Stroudsburg, Pennsylvania	Active	
Pennsylvania Alpha Omicron		Mansfield University of Pennsylvania	Mansfield, Pennsylvania	Inactive	
Pennsylvania Alpha Pi		Slippery Rock University	Slippery Rock, Pennsylvania	Inactive	
**Pennsylvania Alpha Rho**		Susquehanna University	Selinsgrove, Pennsylvania	Active	
**Pennsylvania Alpha Sigma**		Millersville University of Pennsylvania	Millersville, Pennsylvania	Active	
**Pennsylvania Alpha Tau**		Saint Vincent College	Latrobe, Pennsylvania	Active	
**Pennsylvania Alpha Upsilon**		Elizabethtown College	Elizabethtown, Pennsylvania	Active	
**Pennsylvania Alpha Phi**		Grove City College	Grove City, Pennsylvania	Active	
**Pennsylvania Alpha Chi**		Drexel University	Philadelphia, Pennsylvania	Active	
**Pennsylvania Alpha Psi**		Allegheny College	Meadville, Pennsylvania	Active	
Puerto Rica Alpha		University of Puerto Rico	San Juan, Puerto Rico	Inactive	
**Rhode Island Alpha**		University of Rhode Island	Kingston, Rhode Island	Active	
**Rhode Island Beta**		Brown University	Providence, Rhode Island	Active	
**Rhode Island Gamma**		Bryant University	Smithfield, Rhode Island	Active	
**Rhode Island Delta**		Providence College	Providence, Rhode Island	Active	
**Rhode Island Epsilon**		Salve Regina University	Newport, Rhode Island	Active	
Scotland Alpha		University of Strathclyde	Glasgow, Scotland	Inactive	
South Africa Alpha		University of Cape Town	Cape Town, Western Cape, South Africa	Inactive	
South Africa Beta		University of Natal	Pietermaritzburg, KwaZulu-Natal, South Africa	Inactive	(Note: The university merged with the University of Durban-Westville to create the University of KwaZulu-Natal in January 2004.)
South Africa Gamma		Rhodes University	Makhanda, Eastern Cape, South Africa	Inactive	
South Carolina Alpha		University of South Carolina	Columbia, South Carolina	Inactive	
South Carolina Beta		Clemson University	Clemson, South Carolina	Inactive	
South Carolina Gamma				Unassigned ?	
**South Carolina Delta**		College of Charleston	Charleston, South Carolina	Active	
**South Carolina Epsilon**		Francis Marion University	Florence, South Carolina	Active	
**South Carolina Zeta**		Winthrop University	Rock Hill, South Carolina	Active	
**South Carolina Eta**		Furman University	Greenville, South Carolina	Active	
**South Carolina Theta**		Anderson University	Anderson, South Carolina	Active	
**South Carolina Iota**		Coastal Carolina University	Conway, South Carolina	Active	
South Dakota Alpha		University of South Dakota Minuteman Graduate Center	Rapid City, South Dakota	Inactive	
**South Dakota Beta**		University of South Dakota	Vermillion, South Dakota	Active	
**South Dakota Gamma**		South Dakota State University	Brookings, South Dakota	Active	
South Dakota Delta		Northern State University	Aberdeen, South Dakota	Inactive	
**South Dakota Epsilon**		Augustana University	Sioux Falls, South Dakota	Active	
Tennessee Alpha		Fisk University	Nashville, Tennessee	Inactive	
Tennessee Beta		University of Tennessee	Knoxville, Tennessee	Inactive	
Tennessee Gamma		Sewanee: The University of the South	Sewanee, Tennessee	Inactive	
Tennessee Delta		Memphis State University	Memphis, Tennessee	Inactive	
Tennessee Epsilon		Vanderbilt University	Nashville, Tennessee	Inactive	(Note: Chartered as part of Omicron Delta Gamma in 1921, inactive at time of merger)
**Tennessee Zeta**		University of Tennessee at Chattanooga	Chattanooga, Tennessee	Active	
**Tennessee Eta**		Tennessee Tech	Cookeville, Tennessee	Active	
**Tennessee Theta**		Rhodes College	Memphis, Tennessee	Active	
**Tennessee Iota**		Austin Peay State University	Clarksville, Tennessee	Active	
Tennessee Kappa		Middle Tennessee State University	Murfreesboro, Tennessee	Inactive	
Tennessee Lambda		University of Tennessee at Martin	Martin, Tennessee	Inactive	
Tennessee Mu		East Tennessee State University	Johnson City, Tennessee	Inactive	
**Tennessee Nu**		Union University	Jackson, Tennessee	Active	
Tennessee Xi				Unassigned ?	
**Tennessee Omicron**		Belmont University	Nashville, Tennessee	Active	
**Texas Alpha**		Baylor University	Waco, Texas	Active	
**Texas Beta**		University of Texas at Austin	Austin, Texas	Active	
**Texas Gamma**		University of Houston	Houston, Texas	Active	
**Texas Delta**		Southern Methodist University	Dallas, Texas	Active	
**Texas Epsilon**		St. Mary's University, Texas	San Antonio, Texas	Active	
Texas Zeta		Texas Tech University	Lubbock, Texas	Inactive	
**Texas Eta**		Texas Christian University	Fort Worth, Texas	Active	
Texas Theta		Stephen F. Austin State University	Nacogdoches, Texas	Inactive	
**Texas Iota**		Sam Houston State University	Huntsville, Texas	Active	
Texas Kappa		Texas A&M University	College Station, Texas	Inactive	
**Texas Lambda**		University of St. Thomas	Houston, Texas	Active	
**Texas Mu**		University of Texas at Arlington	Arlington, Texas	Active	
**Texas Nu**		West Texas A&M University	Canyon, Texas	Active	
Texas Xi		Texas A&M University–Commerce	Commerce, Texas	Inactive	
Texas Omicron		Texas Woman's University	Denton, Texas	Inactive	
Texas Pi		Prairie View A&M University	Prairie View, Texas	Inactive	
Texas Rho		University of Dallas	Irving, Texas	Inactive	
**Texas Sigma**		University of Texas at San Antonio	San Antonio, Texas	Active	
Texas Tau		Lamar University	Beaumont, Texas	Inactive	
**Texas Upsilon**		Rice University	Houston, Texas	Active	
**Texas Phi**		Trinity University	San Antonio, Texas	Active	
**Texas Chi**		University of Texas at El Paso	El Paso, Texas	Active	
**Texas Psi**		University of Texas at Dallas	Richardson, Texas	Active	
**Texas Omega**		Austin College	Sherman, Texas	Active	
Texas Alpha Alpha				Unassigned	
**Texas Alpha Beta**		Tarleton State University	Stephenville, Texas	Active	
Texas Alpha Gamma		Southwest Texas State University	San Marcos, Texas	Inactive	
**Texas Alpha Delta**		Texas A&M University–Corpus Christi	Corpus Christi, Texas	Active	
Texas Alpha Epsilon		Texas A&M International University	Laredo, Texas	Inactive	
Texas Alpha Zeta		University of Mary Hardin–Baylor	Belton, Texas	Inactive	
**Texas Alpha Eta**		University of North Texas	Denton, Texas	Active	
Texas Alpha Theta				Inactive	
**Texas Alpha Iota**		Angelo State University	San Angelo, Texas	Active	
**United Arab Emirates Alpha**		American University of Sharjah	Sharjah, Emirate of Sharjah, United Arab Emirates	Active	
**United Arab Republic Beta**		United Arab Emirates University	Al Ain, Abu Dhabi, United Arab Emirates	Active	
Utah Alpha		Brigham Young University	Provo, Utah	Inactive	
Utah Beta		Weber State University	Ogden, Utah	Inactive	
**Utah Gamma**		University of Utah	Salt Lake City, Utah	Active	
Utah Delta		Utah State University	Logan, Utah	Inactive	
**Utah Epsilon**		Westminster University	Salt Lake City, Utah	Active	
**Utah Zeta**		Southern Utah University	Cedar City, Utah	Active	
Vermont Alpha		Middlebury College	Middlebury, Vermont	Inactive	
Vermont Beta		Norwich University	Northfield, Vermont	Inactive	
**Vermont Gamma**		University of Vermont	Burlington, Vermont	Active	
**Vermont Delta**		Saint Michael's College	Colchester, Vermont	Active	
Virginia Alpha		University of Virginia	Charlottesville, Virginia	Inactive	
**Virginia Beta**		University of Mary Washington	Fredericksburg, Virginia	Active	
**Virginia Gamma**		Washington and Lee University	Lexington, Virginia	Active	
**Virginia Delta**		Roanoke College	Salem, Virginia	Active	
**Virginia Epsilon**		Virginia Tech	Blacksburg, Virginia	Active	
**Virginia Zeta**		Virginia Military Institute	Lexington, Virginia	Active	
**Virginia Eta**		Old Dominion University	Norfolk, Virginia	Active	
**Virginia Theta**		George Mason University	Fairfax, Virginia	Active	
**Virginia Iota**		Hampden–Sydney College	Hampden Sydney, Virginia	Active	
**Virginia Kappa**		Virginia Commonwealth University	Richmond, Virginia	Active	
**Virginia Lambda**		University of Richmond	Richmond, Virginia	Active	
**Virginia Mu**		Mary Baldwin University	Staunton, Virginia	Active	
Virginia Nu		Norfolk State University	Norfolk, Virginia	Inactive	
Virginia Xi		College of William & Mary	Williamsburg, Virginia	Inactive	
**Virginia Omicron**		James Madison University	Harrisonburg, Virginia	Active	
**Virginia Pi**		Hollins University	Hollins, Virginia	Active	
Virginia Rho		Norfolk State University	Norfolk, Virginia	Inactive	
**Virginia Sigma**		Christopher Newport University	Newport News, Virginia	Active	
Virginia Tau		Emory and Henry College	Emory, Virginia	Inactive	
**Virginia Upsilon**		Radford University	Radford, Virginia	Active	
**Virginia Phi**		Randolph College	Lynchburg, Virginia	Active	(Note: Chapter formed at Randolph Macon Women's College, now called Randolph College.)
**Virginia Chi**		Marymount University	Arlington County, Virginia	Active	
**Virginia Psi**		Randolph–Macon College	Ashland, Virginia	Active	
**Virginia Omega**		Sweet Briar College	Amherst County, Virginia	Active	
Virginia Alpha Alpha				Unassigned	
**Virginia Alpha Beta**		Hampton University	Hampton, Virginia	Active	
**Virginia Alpha Gamma**		University of Lynchburg	Lynchburg, Virginia	Active	
**Washington Alpha**		University of Washington	Seattle, Washington	Active	
**Washington Beta**		Washington State University	Pullman, Washington	Active	
Washington Gamma		Saint Martin's University	Lacey, Washington	Inactive	
**Washington Delta**		Seattle University	Seattle, Washington	Active	
**Washington Epsilon**		Gonzaga University	Spokane, Washington	Active	
Washington Zeta		Western Washington University	Bellingham, Washington	Inactive	
**Washington Eta**		Pacific Lutheran University	Parkland, Washington	Active	
Washington Theta		University of Puget Sound	Tacoma, Washington	Inactive	
Washington Iota		Central Washington University	Ellensburg, Washington	Inactive	
**Washington Kappa**		Eastern Washington University	Cheney, Washington	Active	
**Washington Lambda**		Whitworth University	Spokane, Washington	Active	
**Washington Mu**	July 25, 2016	Seattle Pacific University	Seattle, Washington	Active	
**West Indies Alpha**		University of the West Indies	Mona, Jamaica	Active	
**West Virginia Alpha**		Bethany College	Bethany, West Virginia	Active	
**West Virginia Beta**		West Virginia University	Morgantown, West Virginia	Active	
West Virginia Gamma		West Liberty State College	West Liberty, West Virginia	Inactive	
**West Virginia Delta**		Marshall University	Huntington, West Virginia	Active	
West Virginia Epsilon		West Virginia Wesleyan College	Buckhannon, West Virginia	Inactive	
**West Virginia Zeta**		West Virginia State University	Institute, West Virginia	Active	
**West Virginia Eta**		Shepherd University	Shepherdstown, West Virginia	Active	
**Wisconsin Alpha**	1963	University of Wisconsin–Madison	Madison, Wisconsin	Active	(Note: Chartered as part of Omicron Delta Gamma in 1915)
Wisconsin Beta		University of Wisconsin–River Falls	River Falls, Wisconsin	Inactive	
Wisconsin Gamma		University of Wisconsin–Platteville	Platteville, Wisconsin	Inactive	
Wisconsin Delta		University of Wisconsin–Milwaukee	Milwaukee, Wisconsin	Inactive	
Wisconsin Epsilon		Lawrence University	Appleton, Wisconsin	Inactive	
Wisconsin Zeta		University of Wisconsin–Oshkosh	Oshkosh, Wisconsin	Inactive	
Wisconsin Eta		St. Norbert College	De Pere, Wisconsin	Inactive	
**Wisconsin Theta**		University of Wisconsin–Eau Claire	Eau Claire, Wisconsin	Active	
**Wisconsin Iota**		University of Wisconsin–Whitewater	Whitewater, Wisconsin	Active	
**Wisconsin Kappa**		Ripon College	Ripon, Wisconsin	Active	
**Wisconsin Lambda**		Marquette University	Milwaukee, Wisconsin	Active	
**Wisconsin Mu**		Carthage College	Kenosha, Wisconsin	Active	
Wisconsin Nu		University of Wisconsin–Superior	Superior, Wisconsin	Inactive	
Wisconsin Xi		University of Wisconsin–La Crosse	La Crosse, Wisconsin	Inactive	
**Wisconsin Omicron**		University of Wisconsin–Parkside	Kenosha, Wisconsin	Active	
**Wisconsin Pi**		University of Wisconsin–Stout	Menomonie, Wisconsin	Active	
Wyoming Alpha		University of Wyoming	Laramie, Wyoming	Inactive	
