= Katharine Whiteside Taylor =

American Educator

Dr. Katharine Whiteside Taylor
- Born: December 24, 1897; Louisville, Kentucky, U.S.
- Died: February 23, 1989 (aged 91); San Francisco, California, U.S.
- Education: University of Wisconsin, Madison; Teachers College, Columbia University (Ph.D., 1937)
- Occupations: Educator, author, cooperative movement leader
- Known for: Founding the first parent cooperative nursery school in the United States
- Notable work: Parent Cooperative Nursery Schools (1954); Parents and Children Learn Together (1958)
- Spouse: Paul Schuster Taylor
- Honors: Inductee, U.S. Cooperative Hall of Fame (1996)

Katharine Whiteside Taylor (December 24, 1897 – February 23, 1989) was an American author, educator and pioneer of the parent cooperative preschool movement. She wrote several influential works on cooperative early childhood education that guided the development of parent-run preschools across North America.

== Early life and education ==
Taylor was born in Louisville, Kentucky, to Adelaide Schroeder Whiteside, a former school principal and advocate for women's suffrage, and Henry Robert Whiteside, a classical scholar. She graduated the University of Wisconsin in 1919, where she majored in English, graduated with high honors.

Taylor married economist Paul Schuster Taylor and had three children: Katharine Taylor Loesch, Margaret Taylor Fanger, and Ross (who died in 1964). The couple later divorced.

In the 1930s she pursued graduate study at Teachers College, Columbia University, earning her doctorate in 1937 under the supervision of psychologist Lois Meek Stolz.

== Career ==
In 1927, Taylor founded and became the first director of the Children's Community Center in Berkeley, California. The school is now considered the oldest continuously operating cooperative preschool in the United States. In 1931, she published The Children's Community publication for the American Association of University Women describing setting up the preschool in Berkeley. It became an influential model for the development of other cooperative preschools across the country. Her study Do Adolescents Need Parents? was published in 1938.

By the mid-1950s, over 500 parent cooperatives operated in the United States, many using Taylor's writings as guides. Taylor also edited and published a newsletter which evolved into a broader journal and helped link parent-cooperative groups nationally and internationally. Byers documents Taylor's central role in communications and organization-building among parent cooperatives.

In 1960, she set up a conference which resulted in the founding of the Parent Cooperative Preschools International, an organization promoting cooperative preschools across the world. In 1964, she was selected as a Fulbright lecturer in New Zealand. In 1965, Taylor traveled to Zurich to study for a year and a half at the C.G. Jung-Institut, reflecting her growing interest in psychotherapy and maintained a private practice.

In 1969, the Whiteside Taylor Center for Cooperative Education was established in Montreal in her honor. The center trained educators and parents in the cooperative preschool model. Posthumously, she was inducted into the Cooperative Hall of Fame for her contributions to the cooperative preschool movement in 1996.

== Selected works ==
- The Children's Community (1931)
- Parent Cooperative Nursery Schools (1954)
- Parents and Children Learn Together (1958)
- Fiftieth Anniversary History of the Parent Cooperative Movement, 1916–1966
- Understanding and Guiding the Adolescent Child: Do Adolescents Need Parents?

== See also ==
- Early childhood education in the United States
