= Charles Berger =

Charles Berger may refer to:

- Heinie Berger (Charles Carl Berger, 1882–1954), Major League Baseball player
- Charles Berger (academic) (1939–2018), Professor of Communication at University of California, Davis
- Charles Berger (wrestler) (born 1947), Canadian retired professional wrestler
- Charles M. Berger (1936–2008), American businessman, former Heinz executive
- Charles W. Berger (1936–2016), American politician
