= Alan A. Brown =

Hungarian economist and academic (1928–2010)

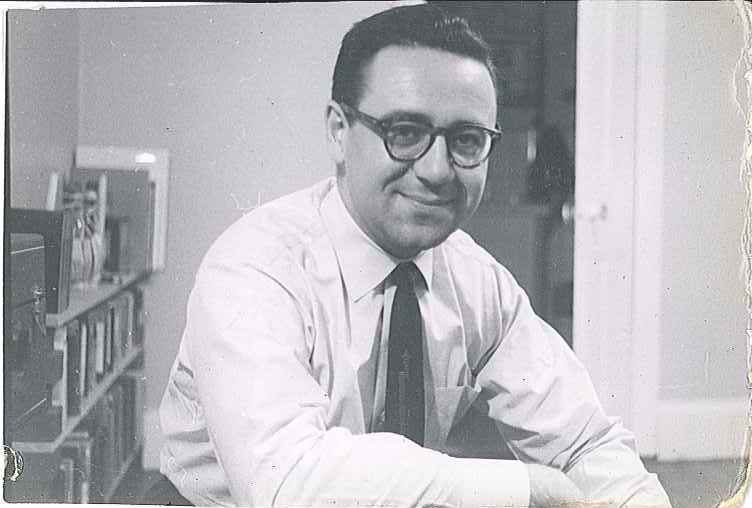
Alan A. Brown, 1963, at his desk at the University of Southern California (USC)

Alan A. Brown (born Andor Braun, March 20, 1928 – March 22, 2010) was a Hungarian professor of Economics. He founded the international honor society in Economics, Omicron Chi Epsilon, while he was a student at City College of New York (CCNY) in 1955. The society is now Omicron Delta Epsilon and has 600 chapters worldwide. Brown arrived in the U.S. in 1949 at age 21, having survived the Nazi Holocaust as the sole survivor of his family (except for three scattered cousins), without money or knowledge of English.

== Early life ==
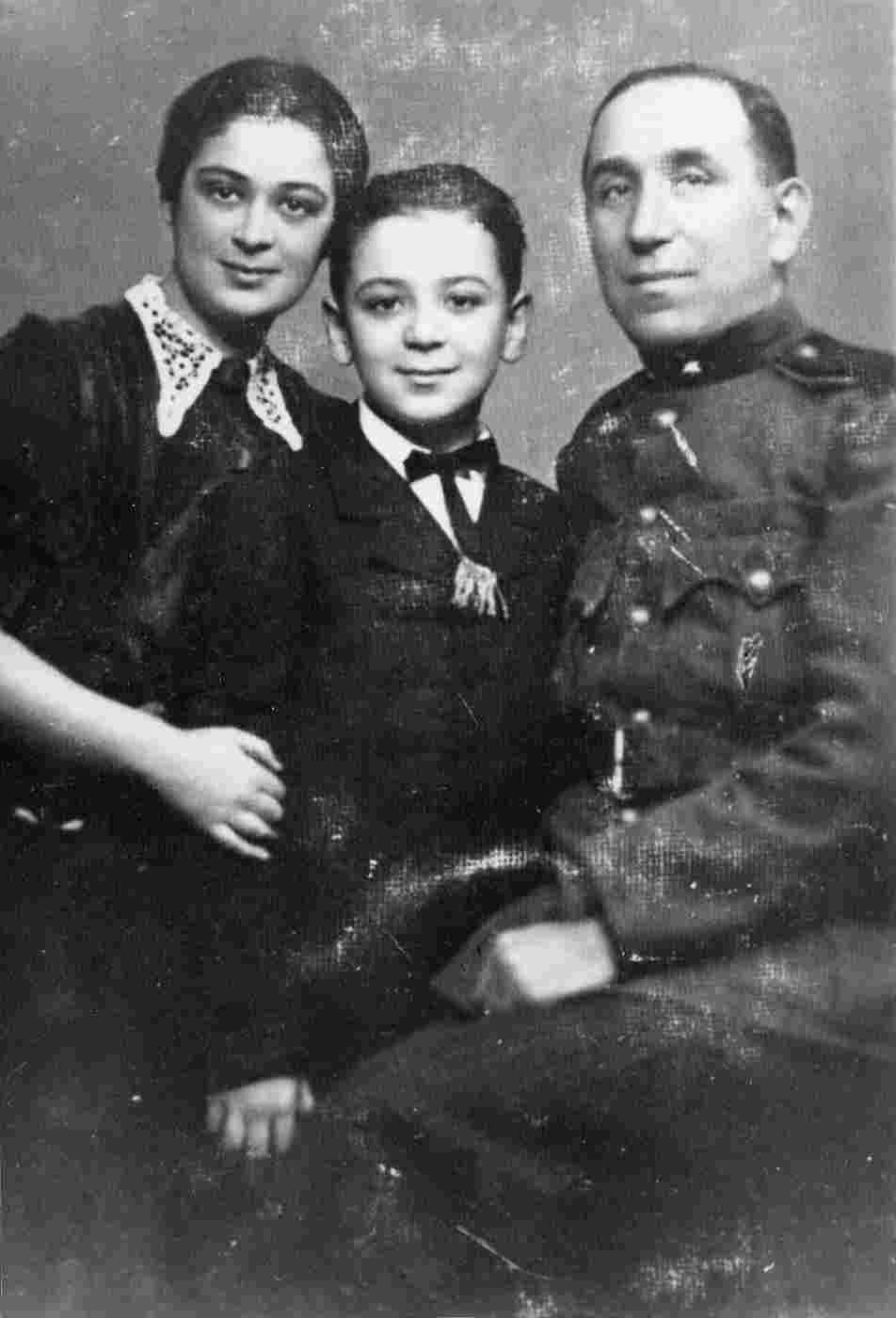
Andor Braun, age 10, with his parents, Erna Kallós Braun and Sándor Braun in Miskolc, Hungary in 1938

Alan Brown was born Andor Braun—commonly known as "Bandi"—to middle-class parents, Erna Kallós Braun and Sándor Braun in Miskolc, Hungary, on March 20, 1928.

According to the Jewish custom, he was named after his uncle Andor, who died before he was born. Andor's grave was one of the very few graves that existed in his family. The Holocaust, which took many other lives in his family, did not allow for proper burial of one's kind.

=== The Holocaust ===
A day before his sixteenth birthday, the German Nazis came to Miskolc. In his personal testimony on YouTube, Brown states, "On June 6, 1944, D-Day with the German defeat rapidly approaching, our ghetto in Miskolc was liquidated." Jewish men lined up in front of a Hungarian bilingual guard (which he called a kapo, derived from the German word for "head," although he was perhaps "a Schwab or Volksdeutsche, that is, an ethnic German that lived in Hungary for a long time"). The Schwab sat at a table and took roll call, categorizing males. Unknown to the men, their age determined whether they'd live or die, with the cut-off being age 18. The Schwab most likely knew that being sixteen years old was more dangerous for him than if he were deported as an 18-year-old in Hungarian forced labor. As a monolingual German Nazi closely scrutinized the interactions, the Schwab quizzed Brown, next in line – "Age?" Brown replied his true age: "16." For an unknown reason, the Schwab countered "18." Brown, baffled, corrected him: "16." This went on a few times until Schwab said in Hungarian, "Do I have to teach you how to lie?" Thus, his life was saved for the first time in his years during and after the Holocaust.

Brown survived six Nazi labor camps - first in Hungary, and then in Austria, where the treatment was more brutal, and where he contracted typhus and tuberculosis, which eventually killed his father. Brown's life was saved by a righteous gentile, Frau Rosa Schreiber (née Freismuth), in whose name a scholarship award was established at the University of Windsor, from which Brown retired in 1994. Brown was fortunate to encounter Frau Schreiber, who ran a general store on the outskirts of his final labor camp. Schreiber risked her life, sneaking small amounts of food and medicine to Brown so that he and his father might overcome the typhus and tuberculosis that was endemic in the labor camp. These diseases overcame his father, who died in his son's arms the day after the Russian soldiers liberated the labor camp.

== Education ==
Brown graduated CCNY with a B.A. summa cum laude, with Phi Beta Kappa in his junior year, and first in his class (in a class of 2000 students) in 1957. He went on to graduate with a Ph.D. from Harvard Graduate School in Economics in 1966. His dissertation advisors were Abram Bergson and Gottfried von Haberler.

While he was an undergraduate, Brown started Omicron Chi Epsilon honor society for economics. He subsequently learned of the existence of another honor society in economics, Omicron Delta Gamma, founded in 1915. Brown was the prime mover to facilitate the 1963 merger of the two societies, renamed Omicron Delta Epsilon.

== Career ==
Brown went on to a long academic career, he became a full professor with tenure in 1971, just before moving to the University of Windsor, Ontario and he retired in 1994. Brown's special interest was Centrally Planned Economy in Eastern Europe.

Brown was fluent in four languages. He co-authored and co-edited eight books in economics and over 50 articles, and organized several international conferences, as well as having founded and served as national president of ODE, the national honor society for Economics.

Among his many awards were the Woodrow Wilson Fellowship, Earhart Fellowship, and Ford Foundation Fellowship. He received an Outstanding Teacher Award, University of Southern California and also at the University of Windsor.

== Holocaust education ==
Close to the time that Alan retired as a professor at the University of Windsor in 1994, a young man came into his office. He asked, "Dr. Brown, would you write a letter saying that I never disrupted your class?" Alan said, "Well, you never disrupted my class – I know that because I don't remember you! But what is this about?" The student revealed that he was a Holocaust denier and unlike the U.S. where "freedom of speech" reigns, denying the Holocaust was met with punishment, and in the case of the university, expulsion. Alan agreed that he would write the letter for the young man on the condition that he accompany Alan to the Detroit Holocaust Memorial Center. Alan never saw the student again, but Alan realized the imminent need for him to speak publicly about his experiences.

Long reticent about his personal history, in the early 1990s he became concerned about the Holocaust denial movement. As he said later in his 1995 speech in Windsor, "As a survivor, I … have to remember and tell others that democracy in the Weimar Republic did not prevent the rise of Hitler. … As a survivor, I also have to remember and tell others that genocide did not stop with the liberation of the camps 50 years ago." In retirement, Alan devoted many hours to lecturing on the Holocaust at elementary school and colleges through the Detroit Holocaust Memorial Center, The Holocaust Center Boston North, and Facing History and Ourselves.

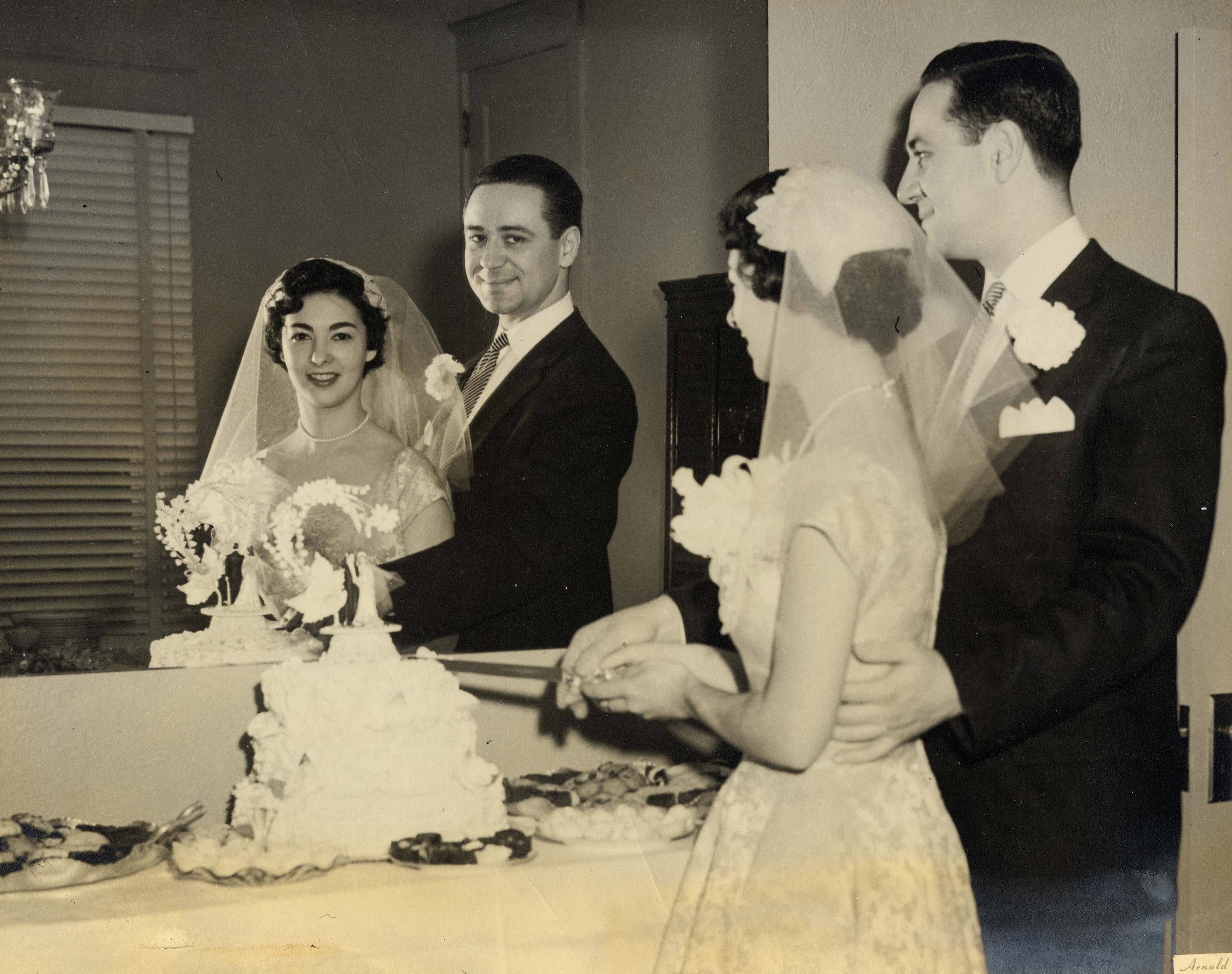
Alan and Barbara Brown at their wedding reception, Harrisburg, Pennsylvania, December 26, 1955

== Personal life ==
Brown met Barbara Delson at City College of New York, which they both attended. She grew up in a small but strong Jewish community in Harrisburg, Pennsylvania. After being in the U.S. for five years, he successfully took the naturalization exam. After the exam, Barbara renamed her fiancé from Braun to Brown. From this time on, he would be Alan Andrew Brown. His last name was changed to eliminate the German referent, to assimilate, and to retain the accurate pronunciation of his name. Brown married Delson married on December 26, 1955.

In 1961, Alan and his wife located Rosa Schreiber. They reconnected with her in 1995 and through a series of events, ensured her rightful place as a righteous gentile in Yad Vashem. Yad VaShem requires verification by three individuals of a person's righteous behavior. It was not until Alan visitedSchreiber in 1995 that he found proof of her having been viewed as a righteous individual by the mayor of the community of Neuhaus, near Jennersdorf, where she saved Alan's life and tried to save his father. The document Alan found stated that Schreiber "expressed her disgust and outrage at the terrorist actions of the NSDAP/AO. She greatly helped the Jewish and gentile slave laborers with food and medicine." It is dated February 22, 1946.

Brown died in the arms of his wife and daughter, on March 22, 2010.
