= Maria Helena Souza Patto =

Brazilian psychologist

- Born: June 17, 1942; Taubaté, São Paulo, Brazil
- Known for: A Produção do Fracasso Escolar

Academic background
- Education: University of São Paulo
- Thesis: Psicologia e ideologia: reflexões sobre a psicologia escolar (1981)
- Doctoral advisor: Ecléa Bosi

Academic work
- Discipline: Psychology
- Sub-discipline: School and educational psychology
- Institutions: University of São Paulo

Maria Helena Souza Patto (born in Taubaté in 1942) is a Brazilian psychologist known for her work on school and educational psychology. She is an emerita professor at the Institute of Psychology of the University of São Paulo, having also served as the director of the Institute between 2004 and 2008.

She is mainly known for her research on school failure in Brazil, and her 1990 book A Produção do Fracasso Escolar ("The Production of School Failure") is considered a classic in Brazilian psychology.
