= Children's Community Center =

Parent cooperative preschool in Berkeley, California, United States

Coordinates: 37°53′12″N 122°16′9″W

- Abbreviation: CCC
- Formation: October 3, 1927; 99 years ago
- Founder: Katharine Whiteside Taylor
- Type: Parent cooperative preschool
- Legal status: Non-profit
- Location: Berkeley, California, U.S.
- Website: www.cccpreschool.org
- Formerly called: Children's Community

The Children’s Community Center (CCC) is a parent cooperative preschool located in Berkeley, California, United States. Founded in 1927 by educator Katharine Whiteside Taylor, it is recognized as one of the first cooperative preschools. CCC is the oldest continually operating cooperative preschools in North America.

== History ==
The Children’s Community Center was established in 1927 when Katharine Whiteside Taylor, and a group of local parents sought to create a school where families could participate directly in their children’s early learning. The model reflected contemporary ideas of progressive education and cooperative governance, in which parents and teachers shared responsibility for curriculum, administration, and child development support.

Taylor documented the school’s founding philosophy in her 1929 publication The Children’s Community, which became an influential guide for other emerging parent cooperative nursery schools.

== See also ==
- Parent cooperative
- Early childhood education in the United States
