= Omicron Chi Epsilon =

American economics honor society (1955–1963)

- ΟΧΕ
- Omicron Chi Epsilon key
- Founded: 1955; 71 years ago City College of New York
- Type: Honor
- Affiliation: Independent
- Status: Merged
- Merge date: January 1, 1963
- Successor: Omicron Delta Epsilon
- Emphasis: Economics
- Scope: National
- Publication: The Journal of Omicron Chi Epsilon
- Chapters: 28
- Headquarters: United States

Omicron Chi Epsilon (ΟΧΕ) was an American college honor society for economics. It was established in 1955 at the City College of New York. The organization established 28 chapters before merging with Omicron Delta Gamma to form Omicron Delta Epsilon in 1963.

== History ==
Under the leadership of undergraduate student Alan A. Brown, a group of students at the City College of New Yorkdecided to establish a coeducational economics honor society in December 1955. The result was the establishment of the Alpha chapter of Omicron Chi Epsilon at City College of New York in January 1956. Brown was the organization's first president. Professor Edwin P. Reubens for the society's faculty advisor.

A second chapter was established at Manhattan College later in 1956. At this point, Omicron Chi Epsilon adopted a national constitution and elected Brown as its national president. John D. Guilfoil was selected to serve as its national secretary-treasurer. The society's purpose was "to recognize outstanding students but also to encourage scholarship through conferences and the publication of its official journal".

Omicron Chi Epsilon quickly expanded. Chapters were established at Fordham University, Queens College, and Hofstra College in 1957. The first annual meeting of Omicron Chi Epsilon was held at Fordham University in New York City in the spring of 1958, with Nicholas Kaldor as the guest speaker. Later that year, chapters were established at Harvard University, Princeton University, Columbia University, St. Francis College, and St. John's University.

The society's fourth annual meeting was held at Hofstra University on February 28, 1959. In attendance were members of nine chapters, as well a representatives from Tufts University and Boston College, which were petitioning for membership. Both chapters were chartered during the meeting.

Omicron Chi Epsilon's fifth annual meeting was held at Harvard University on February 27, 1960. It was attended by representatives from fifteen chapters and two petitioning chapters. Saint Peter's College was admitted as Pi chapter during the meeting. In addition, Brown was granted the title president emeritus for life.

At the December 27, 1960, annual convention at Columbia University in New York City, chapters were admitted at Cornell University, New York University, and Bethany College. Chapters at Southern Methodist University, Dartmouth College, University of Oklahoma, Tulane University, and Syracuse University were admitted at the December 28, 1961 convention at Queens College. The society voted against joining the Association of College Honor Societies but did vote to pursue a merger with Omicron Delta Gamma (Order of Altus).

Brown initiated contact with Omicron Delta Gamma, a similar organization that was established in 1915, about a possible merger with Omicron Chi Epsilon. Omicron Delta Gamma chapters were located in the Midwest and West, while Omicron Chi Epsilon's 28 chapters were in the East Coast and Texas. Their only duplication was at New York University. All chapters of Omicron Chi Epsilon approved the merger via a mail referendum in 1962.

The merger was effective on January 1, 1963, establishing a new organization named Omicron Delta Epsilon. Brown became chairman of the board of Omicron Delta Epsilon.

== Activities ==
Omicron Chi Epsilon conducted business on the national, regional, and local levels. The national organizations held annual meetings and conferences, and published the organization's journal. Its publication was The Journal of Omicron Chi Epsilon. During its annual meetings, members presented papers, and the society's official business was conducted, including electing the executive board. At the regional level, chapters jointly held meetings and programs. Local activities included meetings, speakers, and presentations of papers by members.

== Membership ==
Membership in Omicron Chi Epsilon was awarded for outstanding academic work to male and female juniors, seniors, and graduate students who were studying economics. To be eligible for membership, students needed a 3.0 GPA for twelve hours of economics classes. Potential members were required to present an original paper to the society.

== Governance ==
Omicron Chi Epsilon was overseen by an executive board consisting of a national president, national secretary-treasurer (became national secretary and national treasurer in December 1961), regional vice-president of New York, regional vice-president of New England, regional vice-president of the Central Atlantic, regional vice-president of the Southern region, regional vice-president of North Central, regional vice president for the Western region, and editor-in-chief of the journal. The board was elected at annual meetings. In addition, the society has a senior advisory board consisting of the chapter faculty advisors. The society also had a committee on policy that included former national officers and student members.

== Chapters ==
Following are the chapters of Omicron Chi Epsilon, with inactive chapters indicated in italics.

Chapter	Charter date and range	Institution	Location	Status	Ref.
Alpha	January 1956 – January 1, 1963	City College of New York	New York City, New York	Merged	(Note: Although Omicron Chi Epsilon was established in December 1955, its Alpha chapter was not formed until January 1956, according to the society's founder and first president.)
Beta	1956 – January 1, 1963	Manhattan College	Riverdale, Bronx, New York City, New York	Merged	
Gamma	1957 – January 1, 1963	Fordham University	New York City, New York	Merged	
Delta	1957 – January 1, 1963	Queens College	New York City, New York	Merged	
Epsilon	1957 – January 1, 1963	Hofstra College	Hempstead, New York	Merged	
Zeta	1958 – January 1, 1963	Harvard University	Cambridge, Massachusetts	Merged	(Note: Harvard had dropped its chapter of the Omicron Delta Gamma (Order of Artus), but probably added Omicron Chi Epsilon because Alan A. Brown was in graduate school there at the time.)
Eta	1958 – January 1, 1963	Princeton University	Princeton, New Jersey	Merged	
Theta	1958 – January 1, 1963	Columbia University	New York City, New York	Merged	
Iota	May 1958 – January 1, 1963	St. Francis College	Brooklyn, New York	Merged	
Kappa	November 18, 1958 – January 1, 1963	St. John's University	Queens, New York City, New York	Merged	
Lambda	February 28, 1959 – January 1, 1963	Tufts University	Medford, Massachusetts	Merged	
Mu	February 28, 1959 – January 1, 1963	Boston College	Boston, Massachusetts	Merged	
Nu	1959 – January 1, 1963	University of Pennsylvania	Philadelphia, Pennsylvania	Merged	
Xi	1959 – January 1, 1963	University of Texas	Austin, Texas	Merged	
Omicron	1959 – January 1, 1963	University of Houston	Houston, Texas	Merged	
Pi	February 27, 1960 – January 1, 1963	Saint Peter's College	Jersey City, New Jersey	Merged	
Rho	December 27, 1960 – January 1, 1963	Cornell University	Ithaca, New York	Merged	
Sigma	December 27, 1960 – January 1, 1963	New York University	New York City, New York	Merged	
Tau	December 27, 1960 – January 1, 1963	Bethany College	Bethany, West Virginia	Merged	
Upsilon	1961 – January 1, 1963	Southern Methodist University	Dallas, Texas	Merged	
Phi	1961 – January 1, 1963	Dartmouth College	Hanover, New Hampshire	Merged	
Chi	1961 – January 1, 1963	University of Oklahoma	Norman, Oklahoma	Merged	
Psi	1961 – January 1, 1963	Tulane University	New Orleans, Louisiana	Merged	
Omega	1961 – January 1, 1963	Syracuse University	Syracuse, New York	Merged	
Alpha Alpha	1962 – January 1, 1963	Wisconsin State College–River Falls	River Falls, Wisconsin	Merged	
Alpha Beta	1962 – January 1, 1963	Bradley University	Peoria, Illinois	Merged	
Alpha Gamma	1962 – January 1, 1963	Fisk University	Nashville, Tennessee	Merged	

== Notable members ==
- Charles M. Berger, CEO of Scotts Miracle-Gro Company and business executive who created advertising campaigns for Heinz ketchup
- Alan A. Brown, professor of economics at the University of Windsor
- Thomas DeGregori, economist and professor at the University of Houston
- Julius B. Levine, professor of law at Boston University School of Law
- Alexander J. Kondonassis, chair of the Department of Economics and director of the Division of Economics at the University of Oklahoma; faculty sponsor of chapter
- Charles Siegman, media scholar and policy advocate
- Houston H. Stokes, head of the department of economics at the University of Illinois Chicago
- Stefan Valavanis, a Harvard econometrician and faculty advisor of the Zeta chapter
- William J. Weary, dean of the school of commerce at St. John's University and secretary-registrar of New York Law School

== See also ==
- Professional fraternities and sororities
