= Rose Schuster Taylor =

American writer and naturalist (1863–1951)

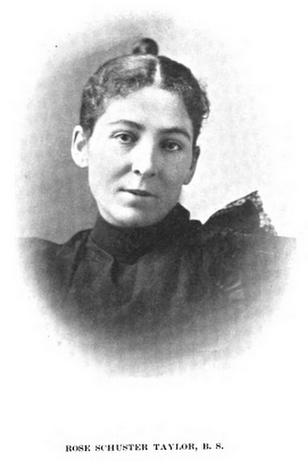
- Rose Schuster Taylor, from a 1900 publication
- Born: January 5, 1863; Middleton, Wisconsin, United States
- Died: January 25, 1951 (aged 88); Berkeley, California, United States
- Other names: Mrs. H. J. Taylor
- Education: University of Wisconsin
- Occupation(s): writer and naturalist
- Known for: one of the founders of the Yosemite Museum
- Notable work: The Last Survivor, Yosemite Indians and Other Sketches
- Spouse: James Taylor (m. 1887; died 1902)
- Children: 4, incl Paul Schuster Taylor (economist)
- Parents: Peter Schuster (father); Barbara Hallauer Schuster (mother)

Rose Schuster Taylor (who wrote as Mrs. H. J. Taylor; January 5, 1863 – January 25, 1951) was a Wisconsin-born writer, naturalist and librarian, based in California.

== Early life ==
Rose Eugenia Schuster was born in Middleton, Wisconsin, one of twelve children of Peter Schuster and Barbara Hallauer Schuster. Both of her parents were immigrants; her father was born in Bavaria and her mother was born in Switzerland. She spoke German at home in her childhood. She graduated from the University of Wisconsin in 1885, with a bachelor's degree in history.

== Career ==
Rose Schuster Taylor taught school as a young woman, and was a librarian in Sioux City, Iowa during her marriage. She moved to California, and was one of the founders of the Yosemite Museum and served as the museum's librarian for many years. She worked with students in the Yosemite Field School of Natural History. In 1929, she was a member of the First Park Naturalists' Training Conference.

She wrote several books, including The Last Survivor (1932), a brief text about Maria Lebrado, a Yosemite Indian (Ahwahnechee) woman, and Yosemite Indians and Other Sketches (1936). Her shorter essays and reports, many on ornithology, botany, or Yosemite history, appeared in various journals and magazines.

== Personal life and legacy ==
Rose Schuster married Henry James Taylor, an educator and lawyer, in 1887. They had four children; their son, Paul Schuster Taylor became a noted economist. She was widowed when Henry died in 1902, in New Zealand. She died in 1951, aged 88 years, at her home in Berkeley, California. Some of her papers are archived with her son Paul's, at the Bancroft Library.

The Hawaii Audubon Society has an annual scholarship named for Rose Schuster Taylor.
