= Parent cooperative =

Parent educational cooperative

Parent cooperatives (also called parent-participation schools and parent co-ops) are educational and child care institutions where parents play an active role as participants in both governance and operations. These programs primarily serve as preschools but also exist for later grades.

== Structure and operation ==
Parent cooperatives are typically non-profit organizations governed by a board composed of parents and teachers. Although governance structures vary, most share several key characteristics:

- Professional educators oversee curriculum development.
- Parents assist in the classroom on a rotating schedule, working directly with teachers and children.
- Parent committees manage fundraising, maintenance, enrollment, and special events.

Because parent participation helps offset staffing costs, tuition is generally lower than in non-cooperative programs. The model also fosters close parent–teacher communication and a strong sense of community involvement.

Although the cooperative movement began in early childhood education, its principles have since been applied at multiple educational levels. Preschool and nursery schools remain the most common form, often emphasizing play-based learning and social development. Elementary cooperatives sometimes evolve from preschool networks and typically retain parent participation in classroom projects or governance.

== History ==
=== Origins ===
The idea of parents collaborating to provide early education for their children emerged in the United States during the 1910s. The first parent cooperative was the Chicago Cooperative Nursery School, established in 1915 at the University of Chicago by a group of 12 faculty spouses. While this school is often cited as the first parent cooperative in the United States, though the Northside Cooperative Nursery School in Pasadena might be an earlier example, though its exact founding date is unknown.

During the 1920s, interest in progressive education and the study of child development encouraged similar experiments. Other parent cooperatives were founded by professionals at universities and colleges, including Smith College, University of California , Los Angeles, and, most notably, University of California, Berkeley. In 1927, educator Katharine Whiteside Taylor founded the Children’s Community Center in Berkeley, California, which became a prototype for later co-ops. Taylor’s 1929 publication, The Children’s Community, helped promote the concept for further spread. Children's Community Center is now the oldest, continuous parent cooperative in the United States.

=== Growth ===
The cooperative preschool model spread to Canada in 1937. The Manor Road Co-operative Nursery School in Toronto, established that year after an incubation period under the sponsorship of the Junior League, is thought to be the oldest program in Canada. The Bettye Hyde Cooperative Nursery School in Ottawa started in the mid-1940s and has been in continuous operation for more than 60 years.

Parent cooperative preschools spread rapidly in the 1940s and 1950s due to postwar population changes, the increased education of women, and parent-education programs that adopted the cooperative model. Local and regional councils formed to coordinate training, share resources, and promote consistent standards.

The movement also took hold in New Zealand starting in the 1940s. Parent-run "play centres" emphasize shared governance and active parental involvement in children's learning experiences. The movement began with a group of parents in Wellington who sought to create a learning environment where they could be directly involved in their children's education. This initiative led to the formation of the first Playcentre, which laid the foundation for the Playcentre Aotearoa nationwide network.

In Great Britain, preschool playgroups began in 1960 when Belle Tutaev, a young London mother, wrote to The Guardian about setting up her own group in the absence of state nursery provision. The response was overwhelming, and the Pre-school Playgroups Association was formed in 1961. By 1986, the Association was linking over 14,000 pre-school playgroups and mother and toddler groups in England and Wales.

In 1960, these groups joined to create Parent Cooperative Preschools International (PCPI), which today remains an umbrella organization for co-ops in the United States and Canada.

=== Challenges and contemporary relevance ===
By the late 1960s, parent cooperatives in the United States had reached a plateau, influenced by economic pressures such as 1973–1975 recession and social changes associated with the feminist movement. Changes in family structures and maternal employment patterns have further influenced parent co-ops. Rising workforce participation among women has reduced the time available for classroom volunteering and governance. Financial constraints reduced funding for parent-education programs, and child care center oversight shifted from supportive social workers to regulatory inspectors focused on licensing requirements. In California, membership in cooperative nursery schools peaked at approximately 300 schools and has declined to around 250 in the 1990s.

Cooperatives have responded by adapting program models to accommodate contemporary family needs. Many schools offer flexible participation arrangements, such as “buy-out” options in lieu of classroom duties, extended childcare, or part-time involvement. Surveys conducted in the early 1990s indicated that cooperatives maintained competitive salaries and benefits for staff, contributing to lower turnover compared to traditional childcare centers. These adaptations have allowed co-ops to remain relevant while preserving their core philosophy of parent engagement and community involvement.

Some families (especially those from low-income, working backgrounds) face logistical barriers to participation even when they want to be involved. For example, a study in rural China found that social class, cultural expectations, and access to resources strongly shaped how parents engaged with their children’s preschools. Research of Chicago low-income communities shows when volunteering in school settings can happen, it increases social capital, self-efficacy, and community engagement among parents, especially mothers.

== Contemporary landscape ==
=== United States and Canada ===
PCPI represents a network of approximately 200 member co-ops and 50,000 families and teachers across the United States and Canada. The cooperative model remains strong in certain regions, particularly in California, Oregon, Washington, Maryland, Virginia, and the Great Lakes states. Many cooperatives seek accreditation from the National Association for the Education of Young Children (NAEYC) to demonstrate their commitment to quality standards.

As of 2007, Canada has over 400 registered child care cooperatives, with approximately 526 including co-op-like organizations. Ontario, Saskatchewan, and Manitoba have the largest concentration of formal child care cooperatives, while British Columbia has a considerable number of co-op-like organizations. In 2005, Canadian child care cooperatives had about 34,000 family memberships, representing approximately 9% of Canadian child care spaces.

=== United Kingdom ===
In the United Kingdom, the cooperative child care sector experienced decline in the early 1990s. In 2003, Co-operatives UK, the national cooperative society, responded to the British government's new focus on child care by seeking funding to conduct research over two years. This research led to efforts to revitalize the sector. The UK promotes a multi-stakeholder co-op model as one of four models for cooperative child care.

=== New Zealand ===
New Zealand has one of the most significant cooperative child care presences globally, with 12% of licensed centres operating as cooperatives. The Federation of New Zealand Play Centres (Playcentre Aotearoa) has been receiving government funding for parenting education programs for many years and continues to expand training programs for parents. Playcentre Aotearoa has a nationwide network of 508 parent-run early childhood centers emphasizing shared governance and community participation.

=== Japan ===
The New Zealand model has been adopted in Japan through the Japan Playcentre Association.
