= Omicron Delta Gamma =

American economics honor fraternity (1915–1963)

- ΟΔΓ
- Founded: May 7, 1915; 111 years ago University of Wisconsin
- Type: Honor
- Affiliation: Independent
- Status: Merged
- Merge date: January 1, 1963
- Successor: Omicron Delta Epsilon
- Emphasis: Economics
- Scope: National
- Chapters: 36
- Members: 6,400 lifetime
- Nickname: Artus
- Headquarters: United States

Omicron Delta Gamma (ΟΔΓ) also known as The National Order of Artus, was an American collegiate honor society for economics. It was established in 1915 by the merger of student economics organizations at the University of Wisconsin in Madison, Wisconsin and Harvard University in Cambridge, Massachusetts. It expanded to include 36 chapters in the United States. In 1963, Omicron Delta Gamma merged with Omicron Chi Epsilon, a similar organization, to form Omicron Delta Epsilon.

== History ==
The Economics Society (aka The Order of Artus) was established by students at the University of Wisconsin in Madison, Wisconsin on June 6, 1913. It was sponsored by Thomas K. Urdahl, chairman of the department of economics. At some point during its first two years, The Order of Artus began using the Greek letter name Omicron Delta Gamma.

A similar organization, the Undergraduate Society of Economics formed at Harvard University in Cambridge, Massachusetts in December 1913 and was sponsored by Professor F. W. Taussig.

On May 7, 1915, the Economics Society and the Undergraduate Society of Economics merged to form The National Order of Artus (Omicron Delta Gamma), a men's honorary fraternity for economics. Taussig and John R. Commons, a University of Wisconsin professor, oversaw the merger. The purpose of Omicron Delta Gamma was "to encourage closer academic and social ties between honor students and faculty" and "the furtherance of the study of economics".

In 1916, chapters were organized at Washington University in St. Louis and the University of Denver. These were followed by a chapter at the University of Iowa in 1917. Chapters were chartered at Vanderbilt University and the University of California in 1921. The latter was organized by professors Ira B. Cross and Paul Schuster Taylor. The fraternity held a national convention in Madison, Wisconsin, in May 1922.

By 1930, Omicron Delta Gamma had established nine additional chapters. The organization's growth slowed during World War II, ultimately losing three chapters. However, it added numerous chapters throughout the 1950s.

On January 1, 1963, Omicron Delta Gamma merged with Omicron Chi Epsilon, a similar organization established in 1955, to form Omicron Delta Epsilon. At the time of the merger, the Omicron Delta Gamma honor fraternity had 28 active chapters, eight inactive chapters, and 6,400 initiates.

== Symbols ==
The ritual of the Order of Artus borrowed from the legend of King Arthur (Artus). Three altars were used during the society's initiation ritual, including an altar of production, an altar of distribution, and an altar of valuation. After explaining the three alters, the master of the round table would tell the story of King Arthur. This included reading:

Brothers, our fraternity is patterned after the Artus-hoffen of the medieval German cities. These societies were commercial city societies. The members were the rich merchants and public spirited men of the cities. The societies met frequently to deliberate on the economic and commercial welfare of the city. At the meeting, there was a small image of St. George slaying the dragon on the table. St. George was the patron saint of the society. This society was a branch of the Knights of the Round Table.

The badge of Omicron Delta Gamma was key that bore the Greek letters "ΟΔΓ" on one side and, on the other side, the image of an arm rising from water with a sword under the word "Artus". This represented King Arthur's sword Excalibur, which was said to have been caught by an arm rising from the water when tossed into the sea. The side of the key with Greek letters allowed a blank space where the school and member's name could be engraved.

In addition, the group held "round table" discussions. The officers of the Grand Chapter of Artus included the grand master of Artus, the grand master of the round table, a master of rolls, and a chancellor of the exchequer. The National Order of Artus also had a Grand Chapter of Artus. Its officers included the grand master of the round table, the grand master of the rolls, and the grand chancellor of the exchequer, collectively called the "Golden Triangle". The group's nickname was Artus.

== Membership ==
Membership in Omicron Delta Gamma was limited to juniors and seniors who were majoring in economics. In the 1930s, membership was further limited to those students who achieved a minimum academic standard in economics and their overall college work. In 1958, this requirement was a 3.0 GPA after completing ten hours of advanced economics. Economics faculty members were also initiated into the society.

== Chapters ==
Following are the chapters of Omicron Delta Gamma.

Charter date and range	Institution	Location	Status	Ref.
May 7, 1915 – January 1, 1963	University of Wisconsin	Madison, Wisconsin	Merged	(Note: Chapter formed from the Economic Society (local), established in 1913.) (Note: Became a chapter of Omicron Delta Epsilon, formed by the national merger of Omicron Delta Gamma and Omicron Chi Epsilon.)
May 7, 1915 – c. 1930	Harvard University	Cambridge, Massachusetts	Inactive	(Note: Chapter formed from the Undergraduate Society of Economics (local). It went inactive by 1930 due to "local conditions" which were against exclusive organizations.)
1916 – January 1, 1963	Washington University in St. Louis	St. Louis, Missouri	Merged	
1916 – before 1962	University of Denver	Denver, Colorado	Inactive	
March 1917 – January 1, 1963	University of Iowa	Iowa City, Iowa	Merged	(Note: Chapter formed from the Economics Club (local).)
1921 – before 1962	Vanderbilt University	Nashville, Tennessee	Inactive	(Note: Chapter was formed by the efforts of Professor M. G. Gordon.)
1921 – before 1962	University of California	Berkeley, California	Inactive	(Note: Chapter formed from the Economics Club (local) by professors Ira B. Cross and Paul Schuster Taylor.)
1922 – before 1962	Beloit College	Beloit, Wisconsin	Inactive	
June 7, 1927 – before 1962	DePauw University	Greencastle, Indiana	Inactive	
1937 – January 1, 1963	George Washington University	Washington, D.C.	Merged	
1938 – before 1962	University of California, Los Angeles	Los Angeles, California	Inactive	
1938 – January 1, 1963	University of Pittsburgh	Pittsburgh, Pennsylvania	Merged	
1939 – January 1, 1963	University of Illinois	Urbana, Illinois	Merged	
1939 – January 1, 1963	Creighton University	Omaha, Nebraska	Merged	
1941 – January 1, 1963	University of Southern California	Los Angeles, California	Merged	
1948 – January 1, 1963	Baylor University	Waco, Texas	Merged	
1952 – January 1, 1963	Muskingum University	New Concord, Ohio	Merged	
1952 – January 1, 1963	Miami University	Oxford, Ohio	Merged	
1952 – January 1, 1963	New York University	New York City, New York	Merged	
1953 – January 1, 1963	Macalester College	Saint Paul, Minnesota	Merged	
1953 – January 1, 1963	University of Connecticut	Storrs, Connecticut	Merged	
1952 (1953 ?) – January 1, 1963	Wichita State University	Wichita, Kansas	Merged	
1953 – January 1, 1963	Pennsylvania State University	State College, Pennsylvania	Merged	
1954 – January 1, 1963	Howard University	Washington, D.C.	Merged	
1958 – January 1, 1963	Auburn University	Auburn, Alabama	Merged	
1958 – January 1, 1963	Brigham Young University	Provo, Utah	Merged	
1958 – January 1, 1963	University of Miami	Coral Gables, Florida	Merged	
1958 – January 1, 1963	University of Wisconsin–Milwaukee	Milwaukee, Wisconsin	Merged	
1958 – January 1, 1963	Kansas State University	Manhattan, Kansas	Merged	
1959 – January 1, 1963	Fresno State College	Fresno, California	Merged	
1959 – January 1, 1963	Southern Illinois University Carbondale	Carbondale, Illinois	Merged	
April 1961 – January 1, 1963	University of Southern Mississippi	Hattiesburg, Mississippi	Merged	(Note: Chapter was formed at Mississippi Southern College, which became the University of Southern Mississippi in 1962.)
1962 – January 1, 1963	Kent State University	Kent, Ohio	Merged	
1962 – January 1, 1963	Northern Illinois University	DeKalb, Illinois	Merged	

== Notable members ==
- Matthew Bucksbaum, cofounder of General Growth Properties
- John R. Commons, institutional economist, Georgist, progressive and labor historian at the University of Wisconsin–Madison
- Ira B. Cross, institutional economist at the University of California, Berkeley
- Frank R. Strong, dean of the Ohio State University Moritz College of Law
- F. W. Taussig, economist and chair of economics at Harvard University
- Paul Schuster Taylor, progressive agricultural economist and professor at the University of California, Berkeley
- Walter E. Williams, economist, radio commentator, and professor of economics at George Mason University

== See also ==
- Honor society
- Professional fraternities and sororities
