= Paul Schuster Taylor =

American economist (1895–1984)

Paul Schuster Taylor (June 9, 1895 – March 13, 1984) was an American progressive agricultural economist. He was an undergraduate at the University of Wisconsin and earned his PhD at the University of California, Berkeley, where he joined the faculty as a professor of economics from 1922 until his retirement in 1962.

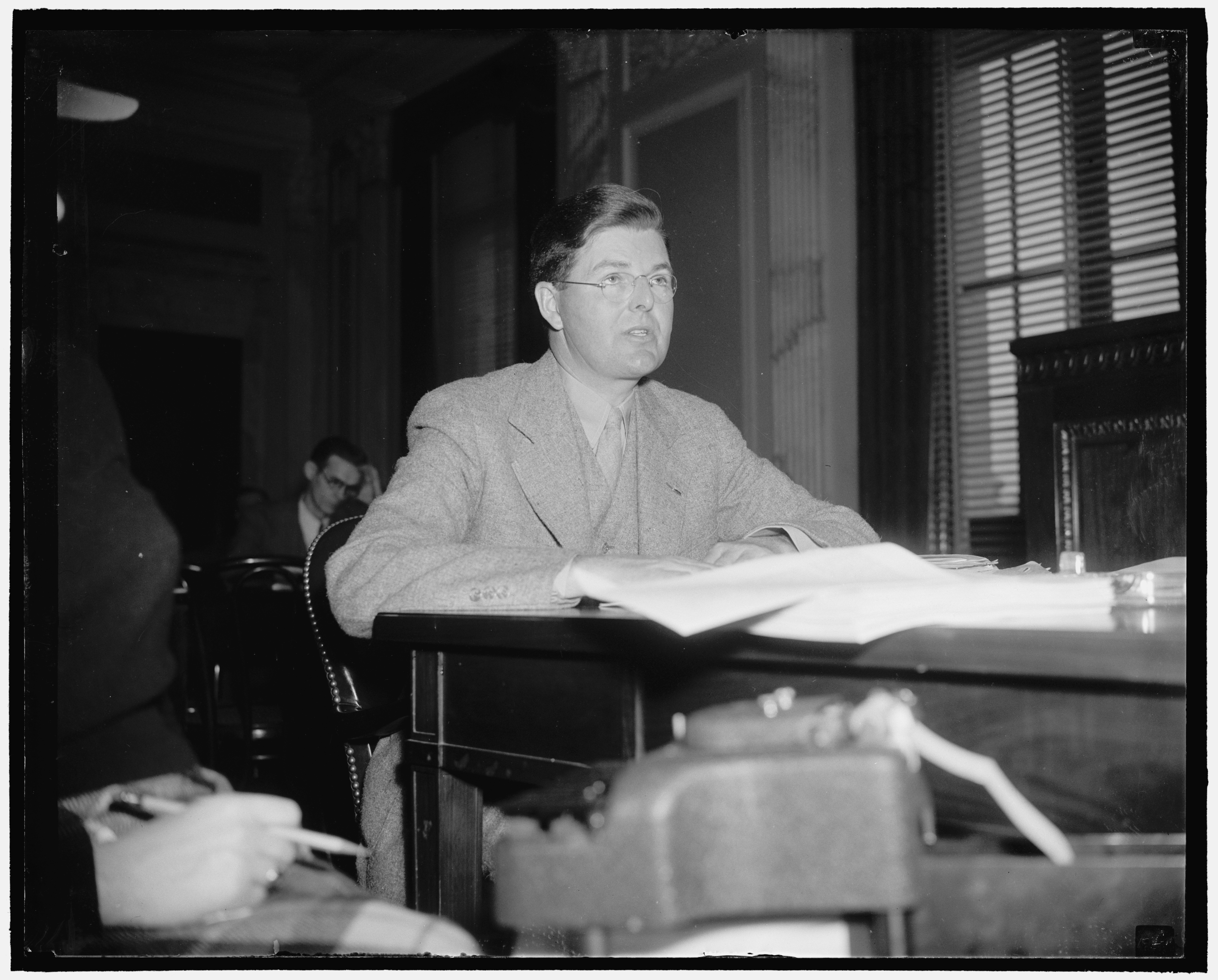
Paul Schuster Taylor before Senate Unemployment Committee

== Early life ==
Paul Schuster Taylor was born on June 9, 1895, in Sioux City, Iowa, to Henry Taylor and Rose Eugenia Schuster. He attended the University of Wisconsin, Madison. Taylor majored in economics and la, where "the caption under his photograph in his junior yearbook was 'I can and I will." He obtained his master's degree from University of California, Berkeley in 1920 and his Ph.D. in 1922.

== Military service ==
When the United States entered into World War I, Taylor sought and received a commission as a 2nd lieutenant in the United States Marine Corps. He took command of the 4th Platoon, 78th Company, 2nd Battalion 6th Marines in August 1917 in Quantico, Virginia. He deployed to France in January, 1918, and participated in the Battle of Chateau-Thierry and the Battle of Belleau Wood. He was severely gassed at Belleau Wood on June 14, 1918. After recuperating he served as an instructor at the First Corps Schools in Gondrecourt until returning home and mustering out in 1919.

== Early career ==
Taylor's research career was launched by the progressive sociologist Edith Abbott. As head of a Social Science Research Council project, she asked Taylor to undertake a study of the increasing Mexican migration into the United States. From 1927 to 1930, he spent a great deal of time on the road, driving through California, Colorado, and Texas, and as far east as Pennsylvania. He sought quantitative data on Mexican employment patterns, interviewed workers and employers, and documented what he encountered with photographs. He went on to spend six months in Mexico during 1931. The Berkeley economics department responded to his unconventional work by denying him promotions and salary increases.

His approach integrated the institutional economics advocated by his professor John Commons with cultural and ethnographic matters – for example collecting Mexican corridos (popular ballads). He published thirteen monographs on Mexicans and Mexican-Americans. In this period he was the "only" Anglo scholar paying attention to Mexican immigrants and Mexican Americans.

Taylor was awarded a Guggenheim Fellowship in 1930, using it to further his studies in Mexico for four months in 1931 and two months in 1932.

== Work and marriage ==
Taylor married Katharine Page Whiteside on May 15, 1920, in Alameda, California. They had three children, Katharine, Ross, and Margaret.

In 1934, Taylor saw the work of the documentary photographer Dorothea Lange, and recruited her to his project. They both divorced their first spouses, and on December 6, 1935, married one another, forming a living and working partnership that continued until Lange's death in 1965. They were parents to Lange's two sons from her first marriage, as well as Taylor's three children.

In 1935, they produced five reports on the conditions of migrant agricultural workers in Nipomo and Imperial for the California State Emergency Relief Administration. With their data, they were able to get state and federal relief funding for housing for farmworkers.

== Migrant farmers ==
In the course of their research, Taylor and Lange encountered the "Dust Bowl" westward migration of ruined tenant farmers across the United States. Lange was hired as a photographer by the federal Farm Security Administration, and throughout the 1930s the two often traveled together; Taylor collected quantitative and qualitative information as Lange made photographs.

Together, Lange and Taylor brought the poverty and exploitation of sharecroppers, tenant farmers and migrant farmworkers to the attention of the American public in their hope that the New Deal would be extended to benefit those who worked on farms. Taylor risked his colleagues' further disapproval by publishing, with Lange, a popular book of text and photographs on the Dust Bowl, American Exodus, in 1939.

== La Follette Committee ==
Taylor's research formed a basis for the 1939 hearings conducted by the La Follette Committee of the U.S. Senate on civil liberties violations against farmworkers. This work antagonized powerful people at the University of California, Berkeley, where agribusiness was well represented among the university's regents and where university agricultural research provided direct support to the big growers (for example, creating hybrids, designing farm machinery, training in agricultural management).

Taylor's research, combined with the values of his Iowa upbringing, brought him to the conclusion that the power of the big growers in California agriculture was incompatible with democracy. Despite Robert La Follette's exposé of violence against farmworkers by sheriffs and deputies recruited by the Associated Farmers (the organization of big industrial farm owners), farmworker unionization struggles were not successful until the 1960s, when Taylor, then retired, supported the United Farm Workers.

== Later career ==
During World War II, Taylor was one of a small number of prominent whites to protest the mass incarceration of Japanese-Americans.

In 1943, he became involved with protests against federal provision of vast quantities of water to agribusiness at the taxpayers' expense. After 1950, this became the major focus of his work. The federal Newlands Reclamation Act of 1902, which provided funding for dams and canals to bring water to parched southwestern farms, had limited the amount of subsidized water for irrigation to 160 acres (0.65 km^{2}) per person. But this restriction was systematically violated, so the reclamation programs constituted huge subsidies to the biggest growers and enabled them to squeeze out small farmers. In 1944, Taylor led opposition to the insertion of an exemption from the 160-acre (0.65 km^{2}) limitation into the U.S. Senate bill authorizing the Central Valley Project to bring water into the San Joaquin Valley. For the rest of his life Taylor fought a losing battle against this policy.

From 1952 to 1956, Taylor served as chair of his department; he then headed the university's Institute of International Studies until his retirement in 1964. Beginning in the late 1950s, he served as a consultant for the U.S. State Department and the Ford Foundation, investigating land tenure and advocating land reform in Vietnam, Egypt, Colombia, Korea, and Ecuador. He applied to the Third World the principles and knowledge he had developed from decades of work on U.S. agriculture and rural poverty. Always strongly anticommunist, Taylor argued for land reform and community development, in the conviction that the concentration of vast landholdings in a few hands and the severe exploitation of farm labor made the development of democracy impossible and made communist popularity grow.

== Selected writings ==
- Paul Schuster Taylor (1983). On the Ground in the Thirties. Gibbs Smith, Publisher. ISBN 978-0-87905-142-6.
- California Farm Labor, 1937
- Dorothea Lange; Paul Schuster Taylor (1939). An American exodus: a record of human erosion. Reynal & Hitchcock. ISBN 978-2-85893-513-0.
