= Early childhood education in the United States =

Early childhood education in the United States relates to the formal and informal teaching of children from birth up to age 8. The education services are delivered via preschools and kindergartens.

== History ==
Early childhood education, in its professional form, emerged in the United States in the early 20th century. In 1926, the National Association for the Education of Young Children (NAYEC) was founded, and is still active today. Around this time, development education standards and teacher training programs were established.

In the 1930s and 1940s, the government began to fund early childhood education through the implementation of the New Deal's National Youth Administration and the Lanham Act. The Head Start program, focused on providing low-income children early childhood education services, was implemented in 1965.

=== Erik Erikson ===
American psychoanalyst Erik Erikson first used the phrase "early childhood education" in the 1950s. In Erikson's understanding, early childhood education should focus on what teachers and guardians think is best for children, not what state or federal governments legislate. Erikson believed that if adequate academic support were provided in the early years of children's lives, then they would have a much more positive learning experience in later adolescence. This insight informs all early childhood education in the United States.

=== Maria Montessori ===
Italian educator Maria Montessori was an innovator and physician best known for her educational method that relied upon following how children naturally learn. This educational method emphasizes self-paced learning and individualized instruction for each child. While a Montessori education can be applied at any age, this method of learning is often applied at different stages of early childhood education throughout the United States.

== Early childhood education policy ==
=== Twentieth century policy ===
During World War II and the Industrial Revolution, the United States implemented a large, well-funded childcare system in order to help mothers join the workforce to support the war effort. The system supported families of all incomes, and the government paid approximately two-thirds of the costs, with parents covering the rest (at a rate of about $9 or $10 a day in today's dollars). These childcare services were set up in factories, churches, and private homes. These programs were very popular, and research demonstrates that, in addition to helping families during the war, adults who participated in the system as children were employed at greater rates, earned more money, and were less liable to require cash assistance than their peers who did not participate.

Children from low-income families realized these positive effects of participation even more than their better-off peers. In 1926, the NAEYC was established with the overall mission to improve the well-being of all the young children in the world focused on quality of education and developmental services for young children around the world. The establishment of this national association pushed the early education initiative as well in the United States.

In 1965, the Head Start program was founded through the United States Department of Health and Human Services as a program to prepare low-income children over the summer for kindergarten. Over the years, the program has evolved and is a respected preschool-aged program within many communities, working with children of all backgrounds and abilities. Head Start grants are awarded directly to public or private non-profit organizations, including community-based and faith-based organizations, or for-profit agencies within a community that wish to compete for funds. The same categories of organizations are eligible to apply for Early Head Start, except that applicants need not be from the community they will be serving.

=== Twenty-first century policy ===
In the early 2010s, there was a national push for state and federal policy to address the early years as a key component of public education. In 2013, the Obama administration made the Race to the Top Early Learning Challenge a key tenet of its education reform initiative, awarding $500 million to states with comprehensive early childhood education plans. According to the United States Department of Education, this program focused on "improving early learning and development programs for young children by supporting States' efforts to: (1) increase the number and percentage of low-income and disadvantaged children in each age group of infants, toddlers, and pre-schoolers who are enrolled in high-quality early learning programs; (2) design and implement an integrated system of high-quality early learning programs and services; and (3) ensure that any use of assessments conforms with the recommendations of the National Research Council's reports on early childhood." This program was called the Preschool for All initiative. In addition, a largely Democratic contingent sponsored the Strong Start for America's Children Act in 2013, which provides free early childhood education for low-income families. Specifically, the act would generate the impetus and support for states to expand ECE; provide funding through formula grants and Title II (Learning Quality Partnerships), III (Child Care) and IV (Maternal, Infant and Home Visiting) funds; and hold participating states accountable for Head Start early learning standards.

Many states have created new early childhood education agencies. Massachusetts was the first state to create a consolidated department focused on early childhood learning and care. In Minnesota, the state government created an Early Learning scholarship program, where families with young children meeting free and reduced price lunch requirements for kindergarten can receive scholarships to attend ECE programs. In California, the Kindergarten Readiness Act of 2010 changed the required birthday for admittance to kindergarten and first grade, and established a transitional kindergarten program. In 2014, Senator Darrell Steinberg led a coalition to pass the Kindergarten Readiness Act, which creates a state early childhood system supporting children from birth to age five and provides access to ECE for all 4-year-olds in the state. It also created an Early Childhood Office charged with creating an ECE curriculum that would be aligned with the K-12 continuum.

==== Funding and challenges ====
State funding for pre-K increased by $363.6 million to a total of $5.6 billion, a 6.9% increase from 2012 to 2013. 40 states fund pre-K programs.

The 2019 budget approved by then-President Donald Trump included a 21% cut in Department of Health and Human Services funding. This is where most early education and care programs like Head Start are included. The department's budget highlights doing away with the pre-school development grant program, which aided 18 states in spreading out access to pre-K for 4-year-old children during the last few years. It helped said states in improving overall quality of pre-K programs. This program was initiated during the Obama administration because of Every Student Succeeds Act or ESSA under the DHHS.

The federal government called for a minimal increase in Head Start funding with approximately $9.3 billion for said program. This subsidy is estimated to serve around 861,000 kids. However, the administration withdrew the requirement that such program started serving children for a longer day and school year due to insufficient funding. The Center for American Progress said President Trump and the House of Representatives advocated deep cuts in programs that were supposed to help impoverished families rather than attend to the needs of low and middle-income households through paid leave and child care as well as increasing minimum wage. More recently, the Build Back Better Act was passed by the House of Representatives on November 19, 2021. This act would give early educators with a bachelor's degree the same compensation as their K-12 counterparts. It also requires that childcare workers get paid a living wage of $15.

To this day, one of America's larger challenges regarding early childhood education is a lack of teachers, partly due to low compensation for rigorous work. The average early childhood teaching assistant earns an annual salary of less than $25,000 with little to no benefits, while the poverty line for one person in the United States is only $10,000 below that salary. The turnover of ECE staff averages 31% per year. Another challenge is to ensure the quality of ECE programs. Because ECE is a relatively new field, there is little research and consensus on what makes a good program. However, the NAEYC has identified evidence-based ECE standards and accredits quality programs. Continuing the leadership role it established with the Common Core education standards, the federal government could play a key role in establishing ECE standards for states. Children whose families cannot afford early education programs are disadvantaged compared to those who can.

=== Court cases regarding ECE policy ===
The American legal system has also played a hand in public ECE. State adequacy cases can also create a powerful legal impetus for states to provide universal access to ECE, drawing upon the rich research illustrating that by the time they enter school, students from low-income backgrounds are already far behind other students. The New Jersey case Abbott County School District v. Burke and South Carolina case Abbeville County School District v. State established early but incomplete precedents on "adequate education" as education that addresses needs best identified in early childhood, including immediate and continuous literacy interventions.

In the 1998 case of Abbott v. Burke (Abbott V), the New Jersey Supreme Court required New Jersey's poorest school districts to implement high-quality ECE programs and full day kindergarten for all 3 and 4-year-olds. Beyond ruling that New Jersey needed to allocate more funds to preschools in low-income communities in order to reach "educational adequacy", the Supreme Court also authorized the state's Department of Education to cooperate "with ... existing early childhood and daycare programs in the community" to implement universal access.

In the 2005 case of Abbeville v. State, the South Carolina Supreme Court decided that ECE programs were necessary to break the "debilitating and destructive cycle of poverty for low-income students and poor academic achievement." Besides mandating that all low-income children have access to ECE by age three, the court also held that early childhood interventions—such as counseling, special needs identification, and socio-emotional supports—continue through grade three (Abbeville, 2005). The court furthermore argued that ECE was not only imperative for educational adequacy but also that "the dollars spent in early childhood intervention are the most effective expenditures in the educational process."

== Basis and research ==
Unlike other areas of education, early childhood care and education (ECCE) places a strong emphasis on the development of the whole child—attending to their social, emotional, cognitive, and physical needs—in order to establish a solid and broad foundation for lifelong learning and well-being. "Care" includes health, nutrition, and hygiene in a warm, secure, and nurturing environment, and "education" includes stimulation, socialization, guidance, participation, learning, and developmental activities. Most of these ECCE programs have an emphasis on learning by play. ECCE begins at birth and can be organized in a variety of non-formal, formal and informal modalities, such as parenting education, health-based mother and child intervention, care institutions, child-to-child programs, home-based or center-based childcare, kindergartens and pre-schools. The goal of ECCE programs is to prepare children for school. Many professionals believe this starts at birth until the child is in school. Different terms to describe ECCE are used by different countries, institutions, and stakeholders, such as early childhood development, early childhood education and care (ECEC), and early childhood care and development (ECCD), with Early Childhood Care and Education as the nomenclature.

As research shows, children's care and educational needs are intertwined. Poor care, health, nutrition, and physical and emotional security can affect educational potentials in the form of intellectual disability, impaired cognitive and behavioral capacities, motor development delay, depression, and difficulties with concentration and attention. Inversely, early health and nutrition interventions, such as iron supplementation, deworming treatment and school feeding, have been shown to directly contribute to increased pre-school attendance. Studies have demonstrated better child outcomes through the combined intervention of cognitive stimulation and nutritional supplementation than through either cognitive stimulation or nutritional supplementation alone. Quality ECCE is one that integrates educational activities, nutrition, health care and social services.

Decades of research provide unequivocal evidence that public investment in early childhood care and education can produce economic returns equal to roughly 10 times its costs. The sources of these gains are (1) childcare that enables mothers to work and (2) education and other supports for child development that increase subsequent school success, labor force productivity, prosocial behavior, and health. The benefits from enhanced child development are the largest part of the economic return, but both are important considerations in policy and program design. The economic consequences include reductions in public and private expenditures associated with school failure, crime, and health problems as well as increases in earnings.

== See also ==
- Education in the United States
- Early childhood education
