= Lois Meek Stolz =

Developmental psychologist

- Citizenship: American
- Occupations: Psychologist and Educator
- Spouse: Herbert Rowell Stolz
- Awards: APA Award for Distinguished Contributions to Developmental Psychology (1968)

Academic background
- Education: George Washington University; Columbia University
- Thesis: A Study of Learning and Retention in Young Children

Lois Hayden Meek Stolz (1891–1984) was an American psychologist and educator in the field of child development and parent-child relations. She was a (full) professor of psychology at Stanford University and the author of several highly regarded texts.

Meek Stolz received the American Psychological Association (APA, Division 7) Award for Distinguished Contributions to Developmental Psychology in 1968.

== Biography ==
Lois Meek was born and raised Washington, D.C., on October 19, 1891. After completing high school at Washington Normal School in 1912, she taught and subsequently became a supervisor in the Washington D.C. public school system. Meek received her A.B. degree at George Washington University with honors in 1921. She attended graduate school at Teachers College, Columbia University where she obtained her M.A. in 1922 and Ph.D. in 1925 under the mentorship of Professors Patty Smith Hill and Arthur I. Gates.

After finishing her degree, Meek worked as an administrator and project director at the Teachers College Institute of Child Welfare Research, where she worked with Helen Thompson Woolley in setting up on a child development program funded by the Laura Spelman Rockefeller Fund. Meek was the first president of the National Association of Nursery Education (1929) and was the first woman to chair the Committee for the National Society for the Study of Education.

Meek married a physician, Dr. Herbert Rowell Stolz, on March 7, 1938. The couple moved Chicago for one year, where Meek Stolz was employed as a research associate at the University of Chicago (1939-1940). During this time, Meek Stolz published her book Your Child’s Development and Guidance Told in Pictures (1940), which received a Parent’s Magazine award. After moving to Oakland, CA in 1940, the couple worked together on the Child Adolescent Study––a longitudinal study of adolescent boys' physical development conducted at the University of California at Berkeley Institute of Child Welfare from 1940 to 1943.

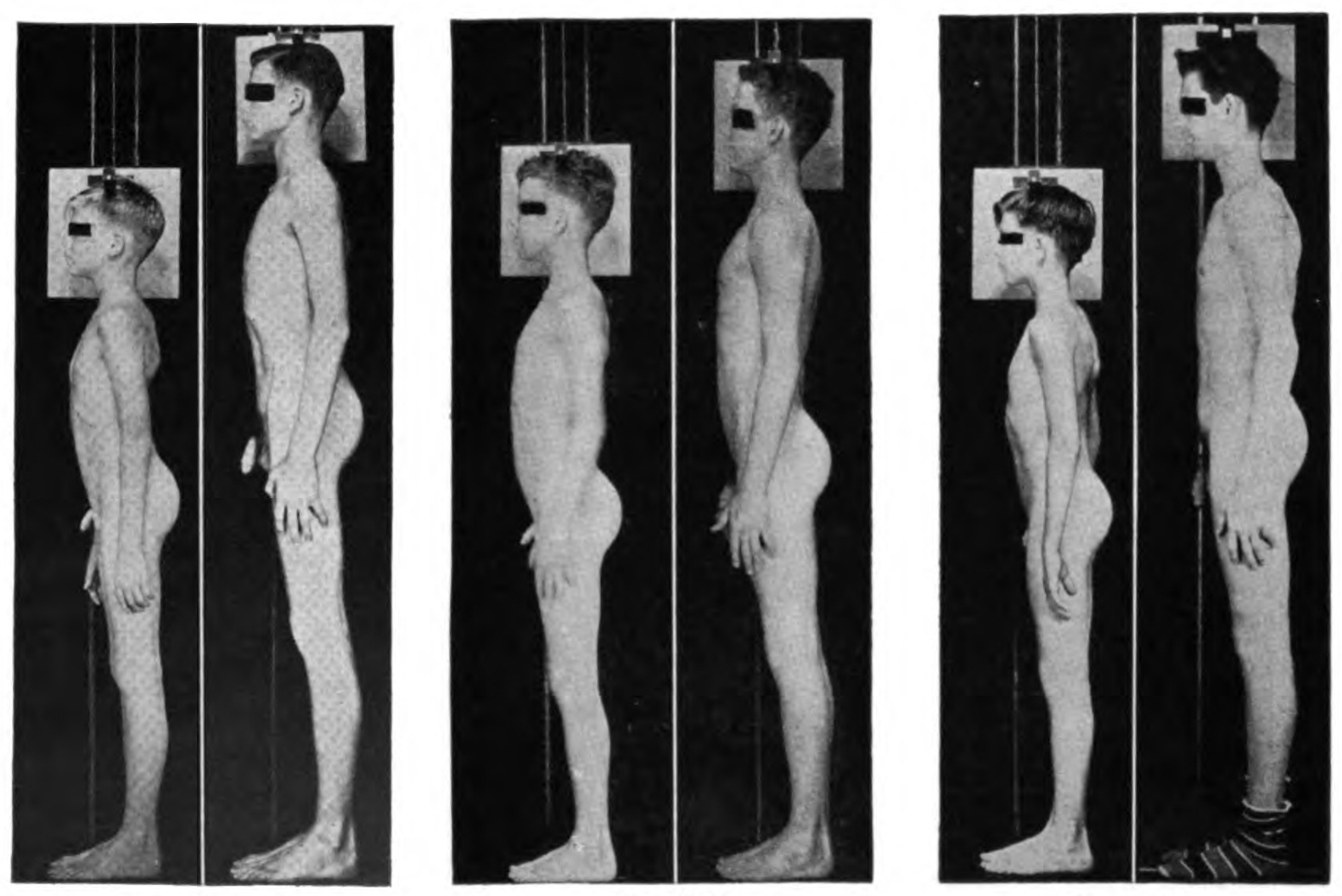
Variations of the height of three boys from 12yo to the end of their growth spurt, from Stolz, H. R., & Stolz, L. M. (1951) Somatic development of adolescent boys.

Meek Stolz joined the faculty of Stanford University in 1944. She began her career at Stanford as an instructor in the psychology department before being promoted to full professor in 1947. In 1957, Stolz retired from Stanford and was named professor emerita. She died in Palo Alto, California in 1984.

== Research ==
Meek Stolz conducted important research on the connection between fathers and their children who were born without their presence during World War II. Her book Father-Relations of War-Born Children (1954) was based on interviews with fathers and mothers, observations of children in groups, and children's responses to five projective play interview situations. After her retirement, Meek Stolz remained active in research. She conducted the Communication and Child Care Project at Stanford, which used in-depth interviews with mothers and fathers to examined the beliefs and values that influence child-rearing practices. The study was published as the monograph Influences on Parent Behavior in 1967.

== Representative publications ==
- Stolz, H. R., & Stolz, L. M. (1944). Adolescent problems related to somatic variations. Teachers College Record, 45(9), 80–99.
- Stolz, L. M. (1960). Effects of maternal employment on children: Evidence from research. Child Development, 31(4), 749-782.

== Books ==
- Meek, L. H. (1940). Your child's development and guidance told in pictures. Lippincott.
- Stolz, H. R., & Stolz, L. M. (1951). Somatic development of adolescent boys: A study of the growth of boys during the second decade of life. Macmillan.
- Stolz, L. M. (1954). Father relations of war-born children: The effect of postwar adjustment of fathers on the behavior and personality of first children born while the fathers were at war. Stanford University Press.
- Stolz, L.M. (1967). Influences on Parent Behavior. Tavistock Publications.
