= School failure =

Failing process in education

School failure (also known as academic failure) is the process in which students repeatedly fail their grades and thus gradually become detached from compulsory education. One of its consequences is dropping out.
