= Charles M. Berger =

American business executive

- Born: Charles Martin Berger; May 2, 1936; Wilkes-Barre, Pennsylvania, U.S.
- Died: December 6, 2008 (aged 72)
- Education: B.A., M.B.A.
- Alma mater: Princeton, Harvard
- Occupation: Business executive
- Employers: 1996 - 2003, Scotts Miracle-Gro Company; 1964 - 1996, H.J. Heinz Company; 1960 - 1963, Procter & Gamble
- Spouse: Jane Purdy Berger
- Children: Cary, Elizabeth and Valerie

Charles Martin Berger (May 2, 1936 – December 6, 2008) was an American business executive who created several well-known advertising campaigns for Heinz ketchup. He worked for Heinz for 32 years before moving on to become CEO of Scotts Miracle-Gro Company. Berger died in 2008 at the age of 72 after a protracted illness.

== Education and early career ==
Berger was born in 1936 in Wilkes-Barre, Pennsylvania, to Edward and Sadie Berger. He attended Princeton University where he graduated in 1958 and Harvard Business School where he earned his M.B.A. in 1960. His father owned a drugstore in Scranton, Pennsylvania, where it is said he learned about the power of branding. Berger started his career at Procter & Gamble in 1960 before being offered a position by Heinz in 1964.

== Heinz ==
Berger was behind the Heinz ketchup marketing campaign that touted the ketchup as being thick and having slow pouring qualities. Advertisements included "the ketchup race" from 1964 and "the slowest ketchup in the West." The commercials showed Heinz being poured from bottles, racing its competitors to see which was thicker. They became one of Heinz's most popular marketing campaigns and were played during Super Bowl V in 1971. The campaigns also spun into the 1970s Heinz "Anticipation" commercials that used a hit song by Carly Simon.

Heinz Chairman and CEO William R. Johnson credited Berger for Heinz success with ketchup by stating that Berger's marketing ideas allowed "Heinz to break out of a tie and gain permanent leadership in ketchup." Berger worked for Heinz for 32 years and was in charge of Heinz's operations in India before leaving to become CEO at The Scotts Miracle-Gro Company in 1996.

While at Heinz, Berger held numerous positions. In 1970, he became the head of marketing for Heinz's British division. From 1972 to 1979, Charles ran Plasmon, Heinz’s Italian division. In 1980, Berger became president of Heinz's Weight Watchers division, where he doubled revenue by expanding its supermarket offerings and turned it into Heinz's fastest-growing division.

== Scotts Miracle-Gro Company ==
In 1996, Berger became CEO of Scotts Miracle-Gro Company. He had been on the board of Miracle-Gro since the 1980s. As CEO, Berger changed the focus of Scotts to being a more consumer oriented company by increasing advertising spending, evolving the brand from that of a chemical company. Sales doubled during his time with the company, largely due to the acquisition of Monsanto Companys' garden unit which included the Ortho pesticide brand. Scotts later built the Berger Learning Center, a multimedia classroom at the company's headquarters.

Berger was Chairman and CEO of Scotts until he retired in 2001. James Hagedorn succeeded Berger as CEO of Scotts and credited Berger as "largely responsible for the company as it exists today." Berger stayed on as Chairman until he retired from company altogether in January 2003.

== Board of directors ==
Berger was a member of various non-profit boards including being Chairman of the American School of Milan and a Board Member for the European Area Young Presidents Association.

=== Select other board positions ===
- 1975-1987, Chairman of American School of Milan
- 1975-1979, Board member of the European Area Young Presidents Association
- 1986-1990, Trustee North Shore Hospital System
- 1995-2000, Executive Committee Columbus Symphony Orchestra
- 1995-2000, Young Presidents Organization Columbus Chapter
- 2003-2008, Chairman of the Board of Naples Botanical Garden
- 2003-2008, Board of Directors and Executive Committee for the Philharmonic Center of the Arts

== Personal life ==
Berger was married to Jane Purdy Berger for 48 years preceding his death in 2008. He was survived by three children, Cary, Elizabeth and Valerie, and seven grandchildren.
