= Supie =

Defunct online New Zealand supermarket

- Industry: Groceries
- Founded: 2021
- Founder: Sarah Balle
- Defunct: 2023
- Fate: Liquidated
- Headquarters: Auckland
- Area served: Auckland; Tauranga; Waikato
- Revenue: $6.5 million (June 2022)
- Number of employees: 118 (November 2023)

Supie was an online New Zealand supermarket. It was launched in 2021 by Sarah Balle and closed down in 2023 after running out of cash. It was put into voluntary administration on 30 October, and subsequently liquidated, owing over $2.1 million to over 4,000 creditors. Its goal was to disrupt the country's supermarket duopoly, operated by Foodstuffs and Woolworths.

== Launch ==
Supie was launched in May 2021 in Auckland by Sarah Balle with the goal of disrupting New Zealand's supermarket duopoly, operated by Foodstuffs and Woolworths. In November, it raised $2.5 million in seed funding, led by Icehouse Ventures. In August 2022, it raised $3.9 million. Balle said that Supie would need $150 million to compete with the two major supermarket operators.

In November 2021, Supie had 6,000 customers. During a COVID-19 lockdown in Auckland 2021, Supie had a growth rate of 1700%. By June 2022, it had 23,000 members and $6.5 million in annual revenue, and in July 2023, it had 55,000 customers and about 130 staff.

In 2022, Supie started wholesaling for small retailers such as dairies. In September, they started selling meal bundles in partnership with the meal planning startup MenuAid.

Supie was planning to expand coverage to the entire North Island in 2024, from which it was only available in Auckland, Tauranga, and the Waikato. This would have made its products available to 77% of the country's population, an increase from 50%. They also planned on launching physical stores, which would have operated 24/7 and be unmanned.

== Closure ==
On Monday 23 October 2023, Richard Nacey and Stephen White, of PwC New Zealand, were appointed administrators of Supie. Customers soon started reporting that they were unable to make purchases on the website, and a few days later, on 30 October, Supie was put into voluntary administration, after it had run out of cash, partly due to a lack of sales, and because a key investor pulled out. Employees were told that they may not receive pay for work they had done the week prior, which was later paid by an anonymous donor. Many of Supie's perishable goods — such as meat, eggs and dairy products — were left to rot on the ground outside of a warehouse after its cooling equipment was liquidated. $400,000 worth of goods were sent back to suppliers, and other recoverable goods were planned to be sent to a food rescue organisation.

A report published in November revealed that Supie owed $2.1 million to over 4,000 creditors, which included Foodstuffs, Woolworths, Fonterra, Coca-Cola, NZ Post, Tegel Foods, and Warehouse Stationery. Inland Revenue was owed almost $900,000. On 16 November, 89 staff were owed $120,000 in outstanding wages and holiday pay. When Supie went into liquidation, it had $179,000 in the bank.

In January 2024, Supie's trademarks and website domain was bought by The Meat Box, an online butcher.

=== Reactions ===
Grocery commissioner Pierre van Heerden described the closure as "disappointing", as the company did not become a competitor in the supermarket duopoly. National deputy leader Nicola Willis shared the same sentiment, saying that she was "gutted". Consumer NZ chief executive Jon Duffy encouraged the Grocery Commissioner to investigate if any anti-competitive behaviour resulted in Supie's closure.

== Operations ==
Supie customers were offered a $99 annual subscription for free grocery delivery and 2% minimum cashback on all orders. At the time of launch, it stocked about 2,500 products which is compared to the 8,000 products that a Pak'nSave offers. This increased to over 6,000 products by June 2022. Until closure, Supie was only available in Auckland, Tauranga, and the Waikato, which amounted to about half of the country's population.

Rather than buying from the two major supermarkets, Supie created its own supply chain, whose suppliers included those who supplied the major supermarkets. Supie believed that they were paying higher prices to suppliers than the major supermarkets. They were able take these higher prices as they had lower costs, such as by not having physical locations.
