= Air New Zealand =

National airline of New Zealand

Air New Zealand Araraurangi Aotearoa

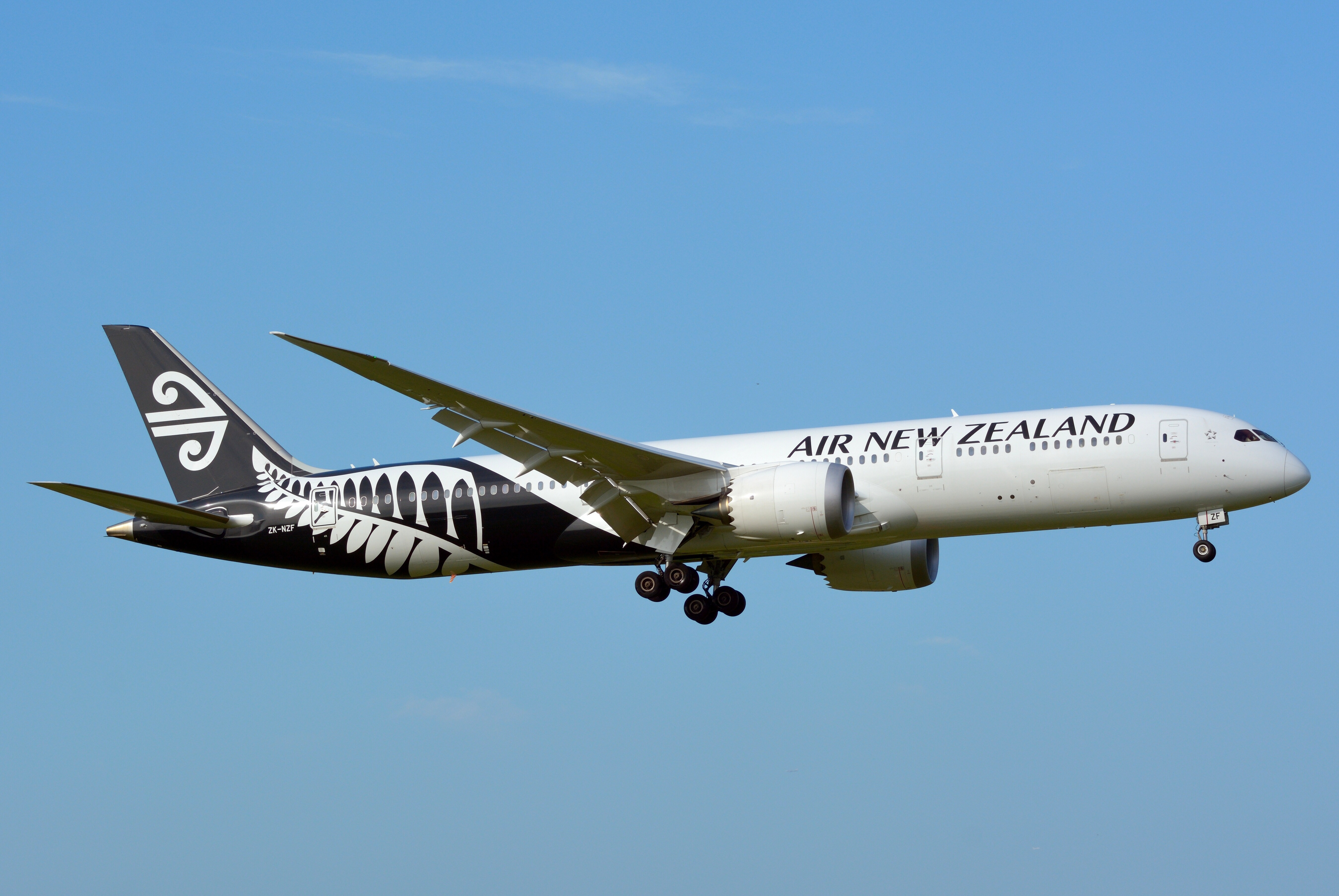
- An Air New Zealand Boeing 787-9
IATA	ICAO	Call sign
NZ	ANZ	NEW ZEALAND
- Founded: 26 April 1940; 86 years ago (as Tasman Empire Airways Limited)
- Commenced operations: 30 April 1940; 86 years ago (as Tasman Empire Airways Limited); 1 April 1965; 61 years ago (as Air New Zealand)
- Hubs: Auckland; Christchurch; Wellington
- Frequent-flyer program: Koru
- Alliance: Star Alliance
- Fleet size: 115
- Destinations: 48
- Traded as: NZX: AIR; ASX: AIZ; S&P/NZX 50 component
- Headquarters: Wynyard Quarter, Auckland, New Zealand
- Key people: Nikhil Ravishankar (CEO); Therese Walsh (Chairwoman)
- Revenue: ▲NZ$7.016 billion (2026)
- Operating income: ▼NZ$470 million (2026)
- Profit: ▼NZ$-242 million (2026)
- Total assets: ▲NZ$9.097 billion (2026)
- Total equity: ▼NZ$1.683 billion (2026)
- Employees: 11,700 (2026)
- Website: www.airnewzealand.co.nz

Air New Zealand (Māori: Araraurangi Aotearoa) is the flag carrier of New Zealand. Based in Auckland, the airline operates scheduled passenger flights to 20 domestic and 28 international destinations in 18 countries, primarily within the Pacific Rim. The airline has been a member of the Star Alliance since 1999.

Air New Zealand succeeded Tasman Empire Airways Limited (TEAL) on 1 April 1965. The airline served only international routes until 1978, when the government merged it and the domestic New Zealand National Airways Corporation (NAC) into a single airline under the Air New Zealand name. Air New Zealand was privatised in 1989, but returned to majority government ownership in 2001 after nearing bankruptcy due to a failed tie-up with Australian carrier Ansett Australia. In the 2017 financial year to June, Air New Zealand carried 15.95 million passengers.

Air New Zealand's route network focuses on Australasia and the South Pacific, with long-haul flight services to eastern Asia and North America. It was the last airline to circumnavigate the world with flights to London Heathrow via Los Angeles and Hong Kong. The Hong Kong stopover was discontinued in March 2013 when Air New Zealand stopped Hong Kong–London flights in favour of a codeshare agreement with Cathay Pacific. Flights to London Heathrow by the airline stopped altogether in 2020 due to heavy competition and a lack of demand. The airline's main hub is Auckland Airport, located near Māngere in the southern part of the Auckland urban area. Air New Zealand is headquartered in a building called "The Hub", located 20 km (12 mi) from Auckland Airport, in Auckland's Wynyard Quarter.

Air New Zealand currently operates a mixed fleet consisting of the Airbus A320, Airbus A320neo family, Boeing 777, and Boeing 787 jet aircraft, as well as a regional fleet consisting of ATR 72 and Bombardier Q300 turboprop aircraft. Air New Zealand was awarded Airline of the Year in 2010 and 2012 by the Air Transport World Global Airline Awards. In 2014, Air New Zealand was ranked the safest airline in the world by JACDEC.

== History ==
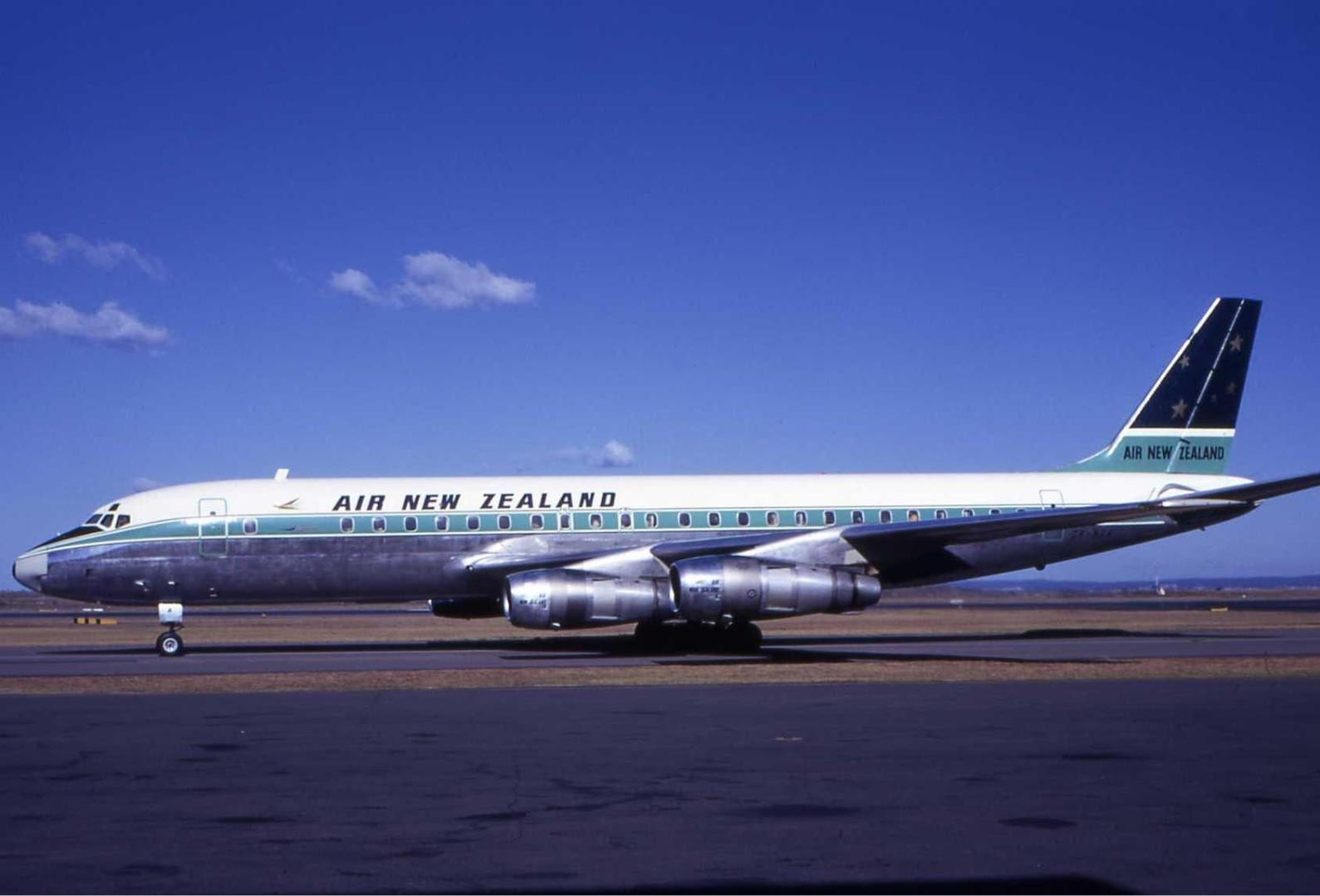
A Douglas DC-8 at Sydney Airport in the early 1970s. Air New Zealand was an early operator of the DC-8. Note the pre-1973 livery with the Southern Cross on the tail.

On 1 April 1965, Tasman Empire Airways Limited was rebranded as Air New Zealand.

With the increased range of the Douglas DC-8s the airline's first jet aircraft, Air New Zealand began transpacific services to the United States and Asia with Los Angeles and Honolulu added as destinations in 1965. The airline further acquired wide-body McDonnell Douglas DC-10 airliners in 1973. The DC-10s introduced the new koru-inspired logo for the airline, which remains to this day.

In 1978, the domestic airline National Airways Corporation (NAC) and its subsidiary Safe Air were merged into Air New Zealand to form a single national airline, further expanding the carrier's operations. As a result, NAC's Boeing 737 and Fokker F27 aircraft joined Air New Zealand's fleet alongside its DC-8 and DC-10 airliners. The merger also resulted in the airline having two IATA airline designators: TE from Air New Zealand and NZ from NAC. TE continued to be used for international flights and NZ for domestic flights until 1990, when international flights assumed the NZ code.

The crash of Air New Zealand Flight 901 in 1979 rocked the airline's reputation among the New Zealand public. A subsequent Royal Commission of Inquiry was critical of the airline and led to the resignation of chief executive Morrie Davis, who had been working in the airline since the 1940s. The New Zealand Government and Air New Zealand formally apologised over the Mt Erebus disaster in 2019.

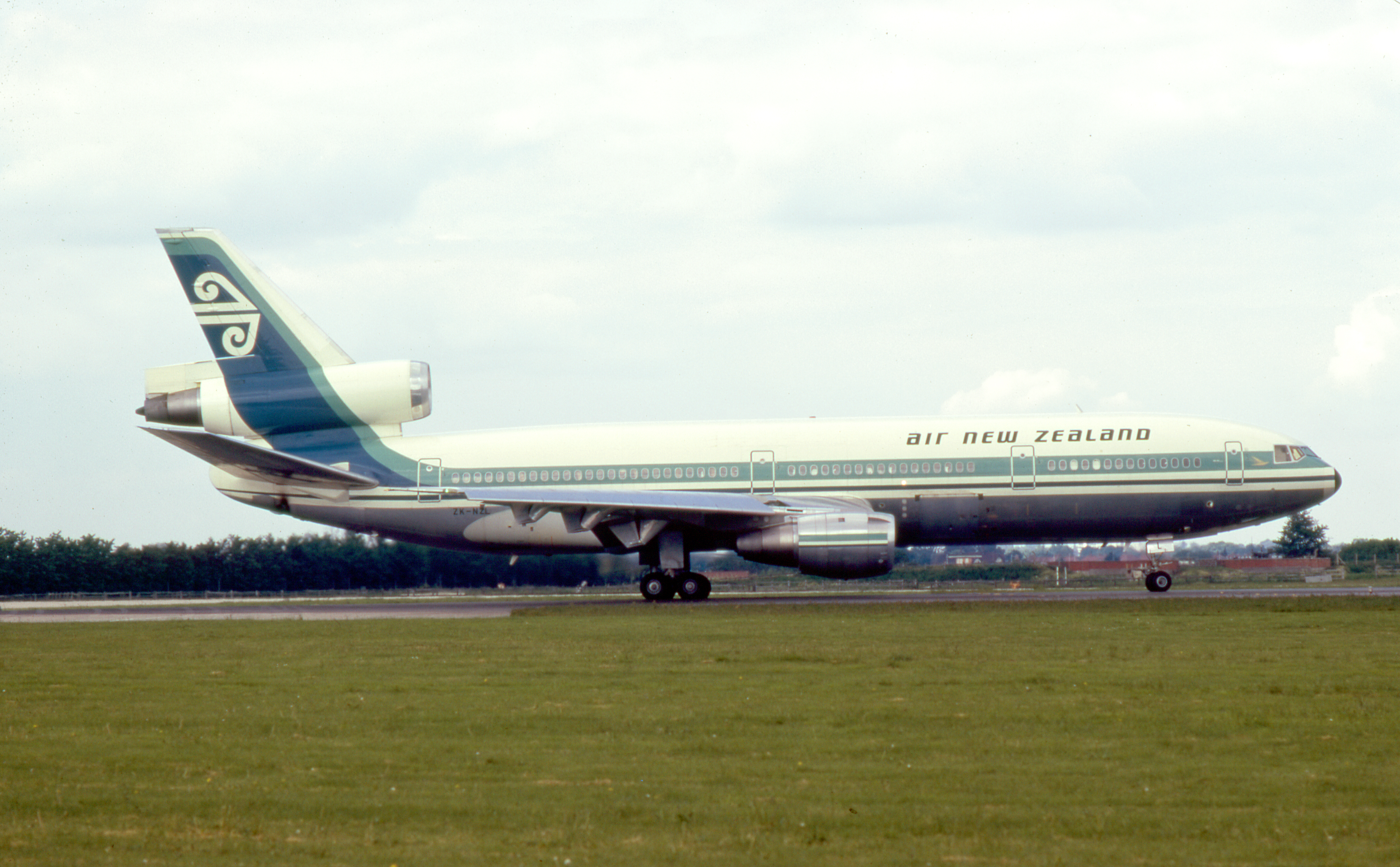
An Air New Zealand McDonnell Douglas DC-10 at Heathrow Airport in 1977. DC-10 deliveries began in 1973 and they introduced a new colour scheme, being the first of the airline's aircraft to feature the now-ubiquitous koru logo.

In 1981, Air New Zealand introduced its first Boeing 747 airliner, and a year later initiated service to London via Los Angeles. The five 747-200s owned by Air New Zealand were all named after ancestral Māori canoes. IN 1985 saw the first Boeing 767-200ER to fill the large size gap between the Boeing 737 and 747 delivered.

In 1989, under neoliberal economic reforms by the Fourth Labour Government, the airline was privatised with a sale to a consortium headed by Brierley Investments. (with remaining stakes held by Qantas, Japan Airlines, American Airlines, and the New Zealand government). The New Zealand air transport market underwent deregulation in 1990, prompting Air New Zealand to acquire a 50% stake in Ansett Australia in 1995.

In March 1999, Air New Zealand became a member of the Star Alliance. From 1999 through 2000, Air New Zealand became embroiled in an ownership battle over Ansett with co-owner News Limited over a possible sale of the under-performing carrier to Singapore Airlines.

=== Merger with Ansett ===
In 2000, Air New Zealand announced that it had chosen instead to acquire the entirety of Ansett Transport Industries (increasing its 50% stake in the carrier to 100%) for A$680 million from News Corporation in an attempt to break into the Australian aviation market. Business commentators believe this to have been a critical mistake, as Ansett's fleet, staffing levels and infrastructure far outweighed that of Air New Zealand. Subsequently, both carriers' profitability came under question, and foreign offers to purchase the Air New Zealand Group were considered. In September 2001, plagued by costs it could not possibly afford, the Air New Zealand / Ansett Group neared collapse. A failed attempt at purchasing Virgin Blue was the final straw, and on 12 September, out of both time and cash, Air New Zealand placed Ansett Australia into voluntary administration, following which Ansett was forced to cease operations. Air New Zealand announced a NZ$1.425 billion operating loss. Air New Zealand was subsequently bailed out by the New Zealand Government, with Helen Clark's Labour Government taking an 82% stake in the company.

=== 21st century ===
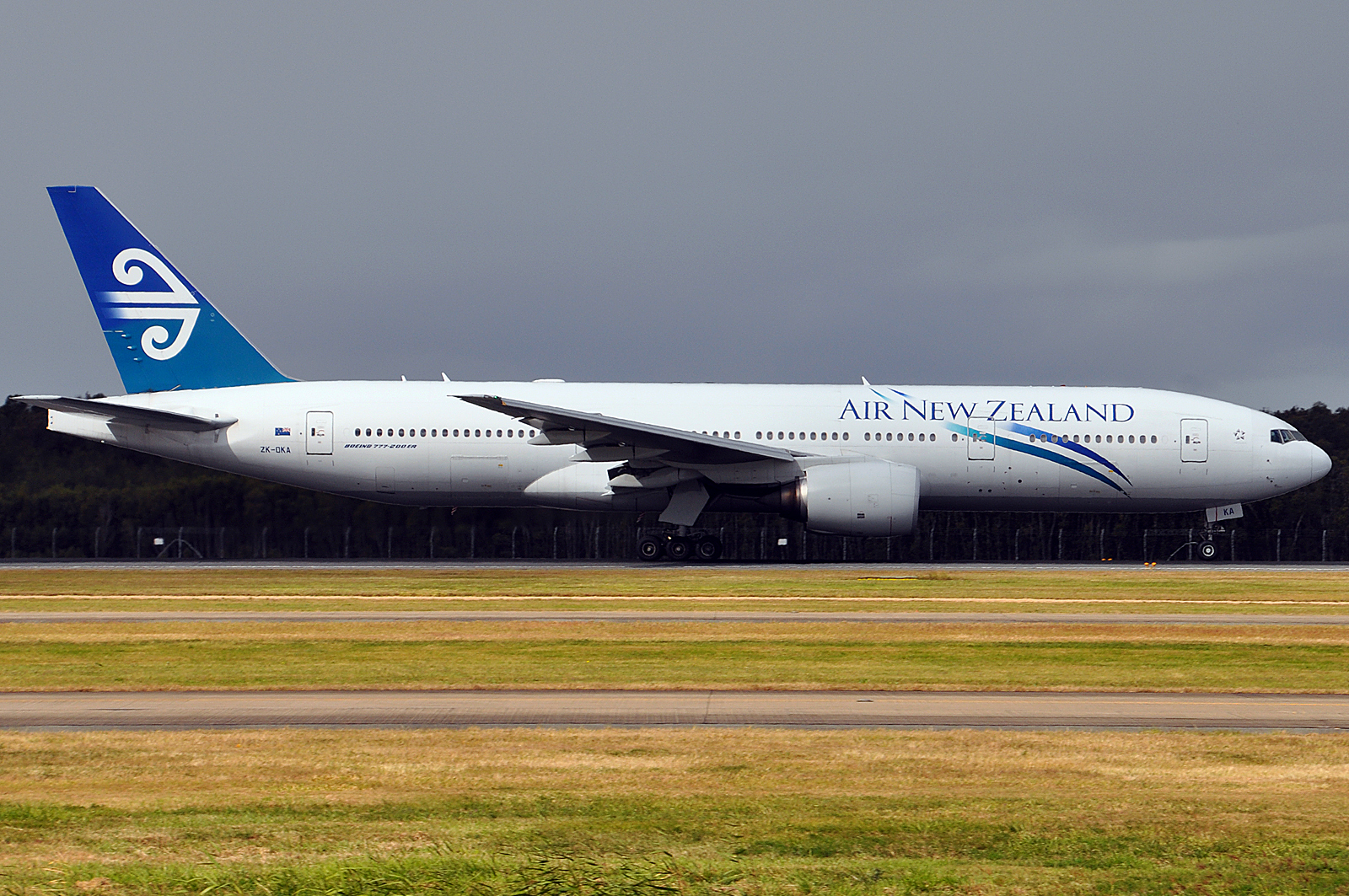
Air New Zealand added the Boeing 777 to its fleet in 2004. As of 2024, the -200ER has been retired while the -300ER plays an integral part in the airline's long-haul fleet.

In October 2001, Air New Zealand was re-nationalised under a New Zealand government NZ$885 million rescue plan (with the government taking an 82% stake), and subsequently received new leadership. This act was the only thing that spared Air New Zealand from going into administration and likely grounding.

In 2002, Air New Zealand reconfigured its domestic operations under a low-cost airline business plan, and the New Zealand government refused a proposal from Qantas to purchase a one-fifth stake in the carrier. Air New Zealand returned to profitability in 2003, reporting a net profit of $NZ165.7 million for that year. The carrier saw increasing profits through 2004 and 2005. In 2004, the airline announced a relaunch of its long-haul product, featuring the introduction of new seats in its business, premium economy, and economy class cabins.

In 2003, Air New Zealand added the Airbus A320 to its fleet for use on short-haul international flights, and later domestic flights. In 2005, the airline received its first Boeing 777 (-200ER variant) aircraft and placed orders for the Boeing 787 Dreamliner in 2004. The airline was later announced as the launch customer for the −9 variant of the 787.

On 21 December 2010, the New Zealand government approved an alliance between Air New Zealand and Australian airline Virgin Blue (now named Virgin Australia), which allowed both airlines to expand their operations between Australia and New Zealand with codeshares for trans-Tasman and connecting domestic flights, and reciprocal access to frequent flyer programmes and airport lounges. Air New Zealand subsequently purchased a 26% shareholding in Virgin Australia Holdings to cement the relationship. By October 2016 Air New Zealand sold its remaining stake in Virgin Australia to investors and the Nasham Group. On 4 April 2018, Air New Zealand ended its partnership with Virgin Australia which went into effect from 28 October 2018.

In 2011, Air New Zealand introduced the Boeing 777-300ER to its fleet, as well as the Economy Skycouch, a set of three economy class seats that could be converted into a flat surface by raising the leg rests. After a four-year delay, Air New Zealand took delivery of its first Boeing 787-9 on 9 July 2014. The airline retired its final Boeing 747 in September 2014, its last Boeing 737 in September 2015, and its last Boeing 767 in March 2017, leaving it with a simplified fleet of Airbus A320 aircraft for short-haul operations and Boeing 777 and 787 aircraft for long-haul operations.

In November 2013, the New Zealand Government reduced its share in Air New Zealand from 73% to 53% as part of its controversial asset sales programme, realising $365 million.

In October 2019, the airline announced it would discontinue its Los Angeles to London route in October 2020 while launching a new non-stop route from Auckland to New York. In March 2020 Air New Zealand sold its London Heathrow slots for US$27 million (approximately NZ$42 million). The 10:50 arrival and 15:20 departure slots were taken over by United Airlines. The London route was prematurely cancelled in March 2020 due to the COVID-19 pandemic, while the launch of the New York route was rescheduled, with the first flight taking place on 17 September 2022.

Air New Zealand announced a major refurbishment of the cabins of its 787 aircraft in June 2022, with the first aircraft going into service in 2025. A new seating option dubbed "The Skynest" is set to be introduced on incoming new Boeing 787-9 and 787-10 aircraft from 2026.

== Corporate affairs and identity ==
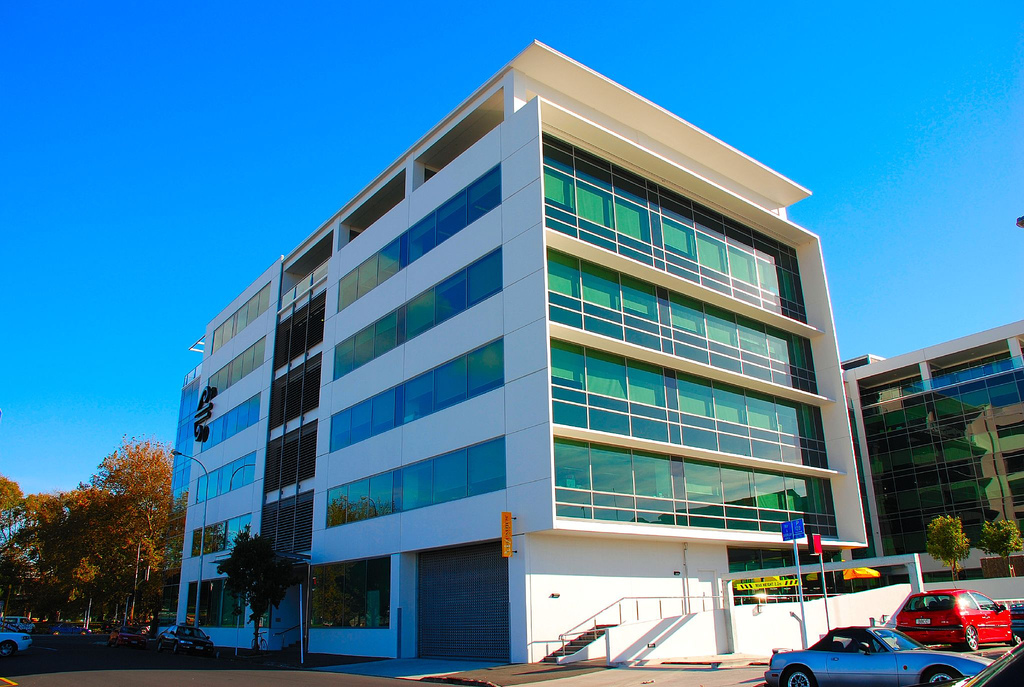
"The Hub", Air New Zealand head office 36.8449°S 174.7533°E

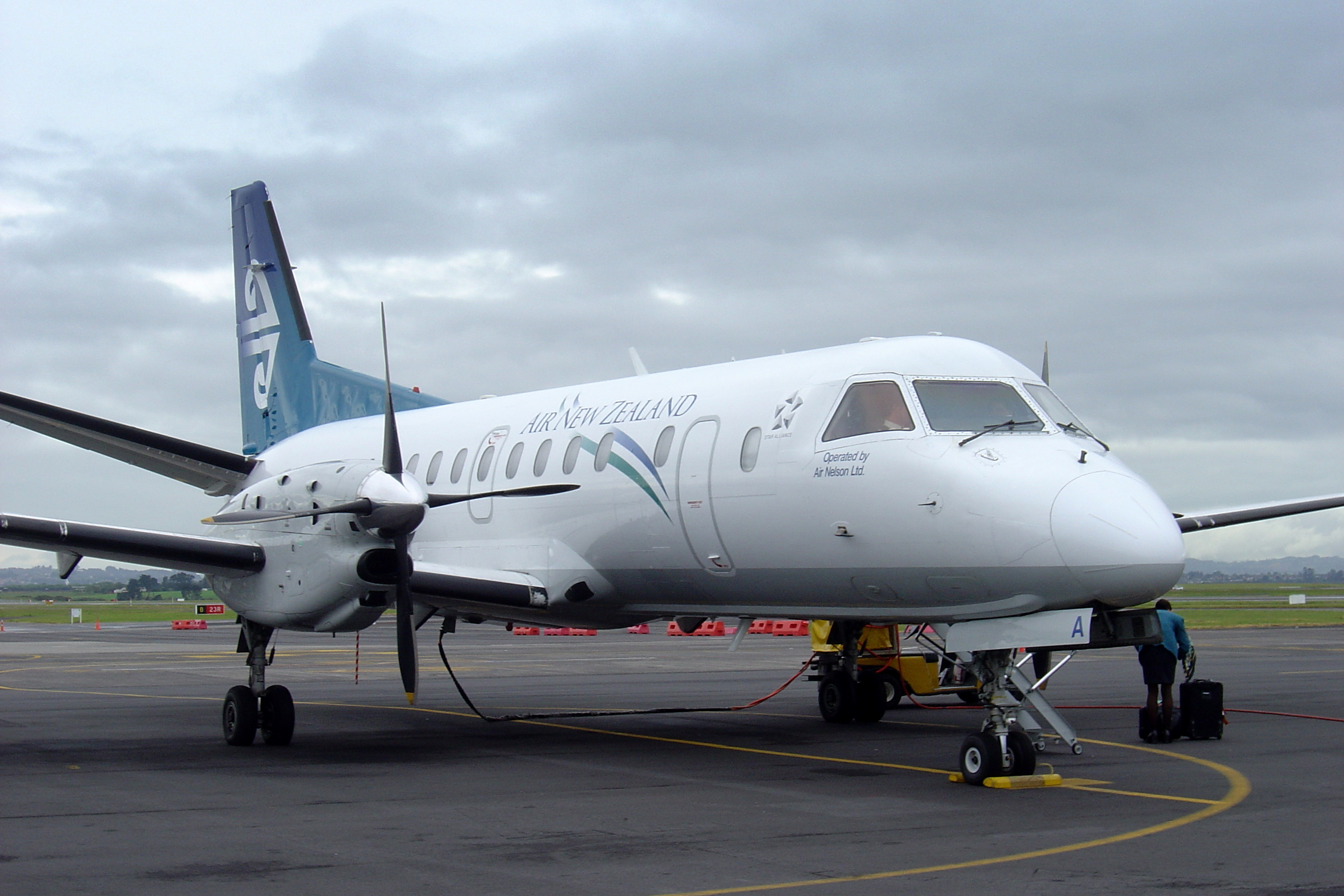
Retired Air Nelson Saab 340A at Auckland Airport

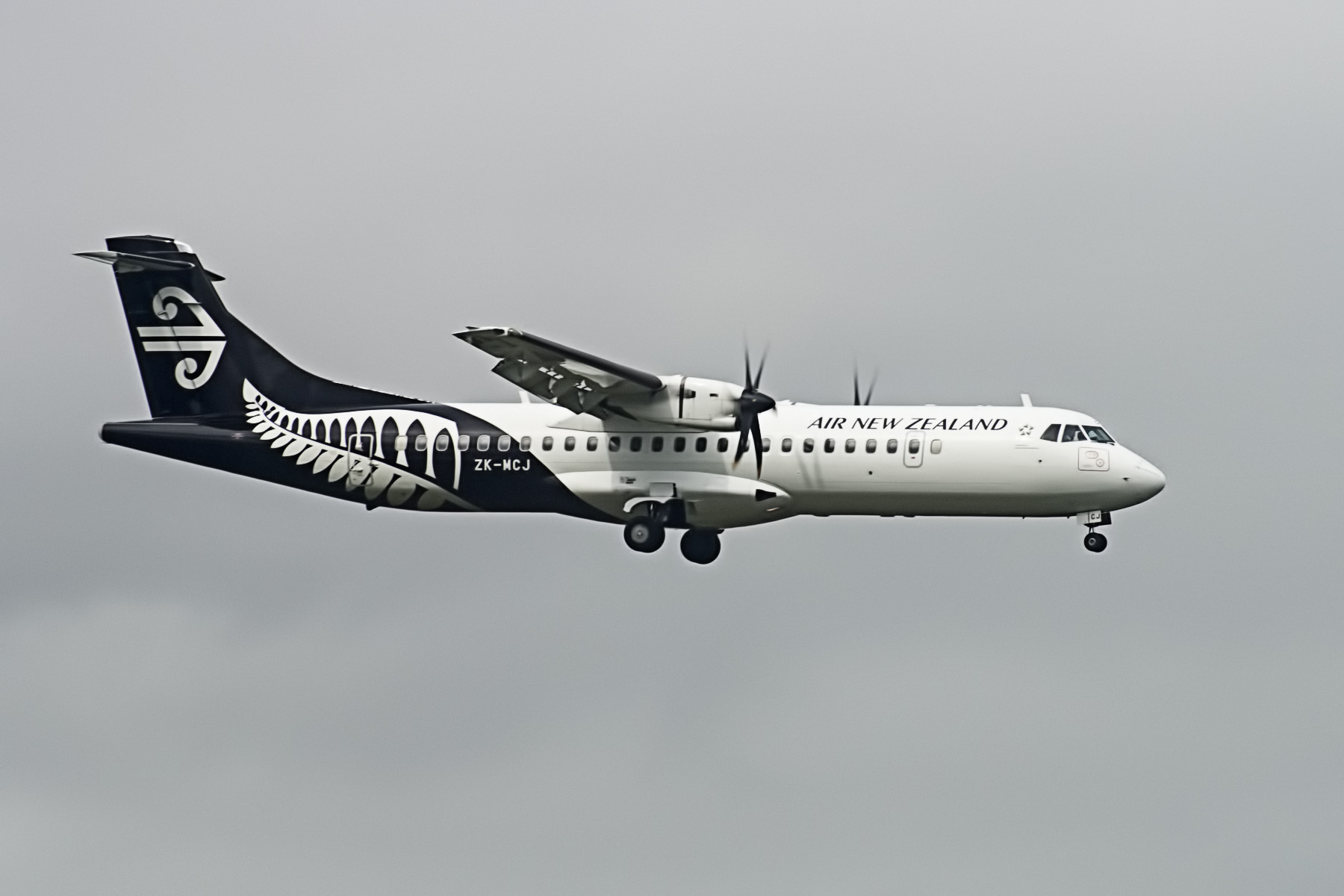
A former Mount Cook Airlines ATR-72-500

Zeal320 logo

=== Head office ===
The Air New Zealand head office, "The Hub", is a 15,600-square-metre (168,000 sq ft) office park located at the corner of Beaumont and Fanshawe streets in Wynyard Quarter, Auckland. The office includes two connected six-level buildings. It opened in 2006 after costing NZ$60 million to develop and construct. From late September to early October 2006 the airline moved 1,000 employees into "The Hub" from four buildings in the Auckland CBD, and other buildings elsewhere.

Air New Zealand previously had its head office in the Quay Tower in the Auckland CBD, and from 1948 to 1973 had its head office in Airways House on Customs Street East. The company also occupies premises at the Smales Farm Business Park in Takapuna on the North Shore, adjacent to the bus station and Northern motorway. It is home to the Contact Centre staff (additional to those at 'The Hub'), Tandem Travel and other services.

=== Subsidiaries ===
==== Operations subsidiaries ====
Air New Zealand Cargo is the only current subsidiary of Air New Zealand Limited.

Previously, the airline had several wholly owned subsidiary regional airlines – Air Nelson, Mount Cook Airline and Eagle Airways – that served regional destinations throughout New Zealand under the Air New Zealand Link brand. On 26 August 2016, Eagle Airways ceased operations following the retirement of the Beech 1900D aircraft. Air Nelson and Mount Cook Airline ceased operations in late 2019, and were merged into its parent's operations.

In 2006, subsidiary company Zeal320 was introduced to help combat increasing labour costs. Zeal320 operated Air New Zealand's trans-Tasman fleet of Airbus A320-200 aircraft under the Air New Zealand brand. On 31 July 2006, flights were re-numbered to the NZ700-999 series for trans-Tasman services, and NZ1000 series for domestic services. All of Air New Zealand's A320-200s were registered to Zeal320 until 26 November 2008, when ownership of the fleet was transferred back to Air New Zealand. Continued industrial action by staff employed in the subsidiary during 2009 permanently delayed a proposed low-cost carrier airline as a successor to Freedom Air, that would have also employed the Airbus A320 on domestic routes to counter Jetstar. In 2015 Zeal320 was removed from the New Zealand Companies Office.

==== Technical subsidiaries ====
The following are technical operations subsidiaries of Air New Zealand:

- Air New Zealand Engineering Services
- Christchurch Engine Centre (50%)

In June 2015, Air New Zealand confirmed the sale of its Safe Air engineering subsidiary to the Australian arm of Airbus.

=== Sponsorships ===
Air New Zealand was the title sponsor of the Air New Zealand Cup domestic rugby union club competition through the 2009 season. The airline remains a major sponsor of New Zealand rugby, including the New Zealand national rugby union team, known as the All Blacks. The airline also sponsors the Air New Zealand Wine Awards and World of Wearable Arts; and partners with New Zealand's Department of Conservation and Antarctica New Zealand.

=== Brand and livery ===
Air New Zealand's previous "Pacific Wave teal", introduced in 1996

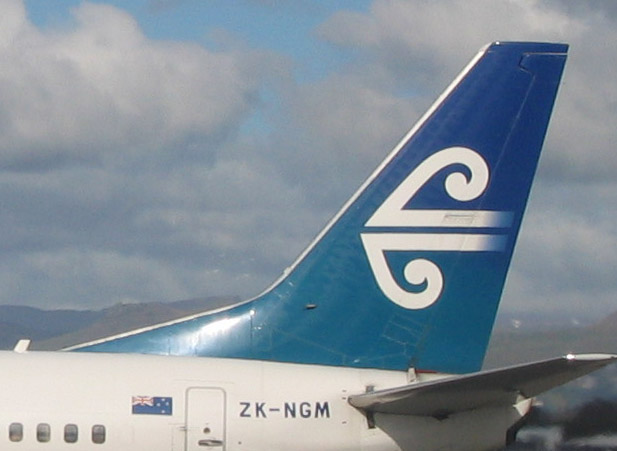
Air New Zealand's koru logo and tail symbol, seen on retired Boeing 737–300 aircraft ZK-NGM

The Air New Zealand logo is a Māori koru, which is a stylised representation of a silver fern frond unfolding. On 27 March 2006, Air New Zealand replaced its previous "Pacific Wave" branding with a new brand identity, which involved a controversial Zambesi-designed uniform, new logo, new colour scheme and new look signage at check-in counters and refreshed lounges. The new visual identity also featured the koru prominently across all brand elements. In 2009, the "Pacific Wave" fuselage stripes were removed from short-haul aircraft, simplifying the overall livery, and was in the process of also being removed from long haul aircraft before the logo was changed again.

A rebranding was announced in July 2012. Dropping the teal and green colours that had previously represented the airline since its beginnings, black was adopted as the new brand colour in a joint effort between the airline, New Zealand design agency Designworks and New Zealand typographer Kris Sowersby, who also designed and introduced a new logo typeface. Tails of the aircraft and the brand typeface changed to black, while the rest of the fuselage remained white. Then-CEO Rob Fyfe said of the rebranding, "Black has resonated well with our customers and staff who identify with it as the colour of New Zealand and a natural choice for our national airline." The airline began using black as its corporate colour ahead of a sponsorship campaign with NZ's rugby union team, the All Blacks, in 2011.

Another new livery was announced on 12 June 2013. In conjunction with a NZ$20 million Memorandum of Understanding with the national tourism agency Tourism New Zealand for joint marketing, TNZ granted permission for Air New Zealand to use the "New Zealand Fern Mark", a standard fern logo used and managed by Tourism NZ and NZ Trade and Enterprise for international promotion, in its livery.

Two new liveries were unveiled in 2013. The first is predominantly white with a black strip running downwards on the rear fuselage from the tail, adorned with a koru logo in white, to disappear downwards just aft of the junction of the wings with the fuselage. The black and white fern mark adorns the fuselage. This livery is used on most of the fleet, with the exception of the first aircraft of each type; these have an all black livery with the fern and typography in white. The first aircraft to be painted in this livery was rolled out on 24 September 2013.

A new uniform for the airline's workforce was revealed in 2025, which incorporates tāniko co-created by Emilia Wickstead and tohunga-tā-moko designed by Te Rangitu Netana. Purple, black, and navy blue were adopted as the major brand colours beginning in 2023.

Air New Zealand's liveries history

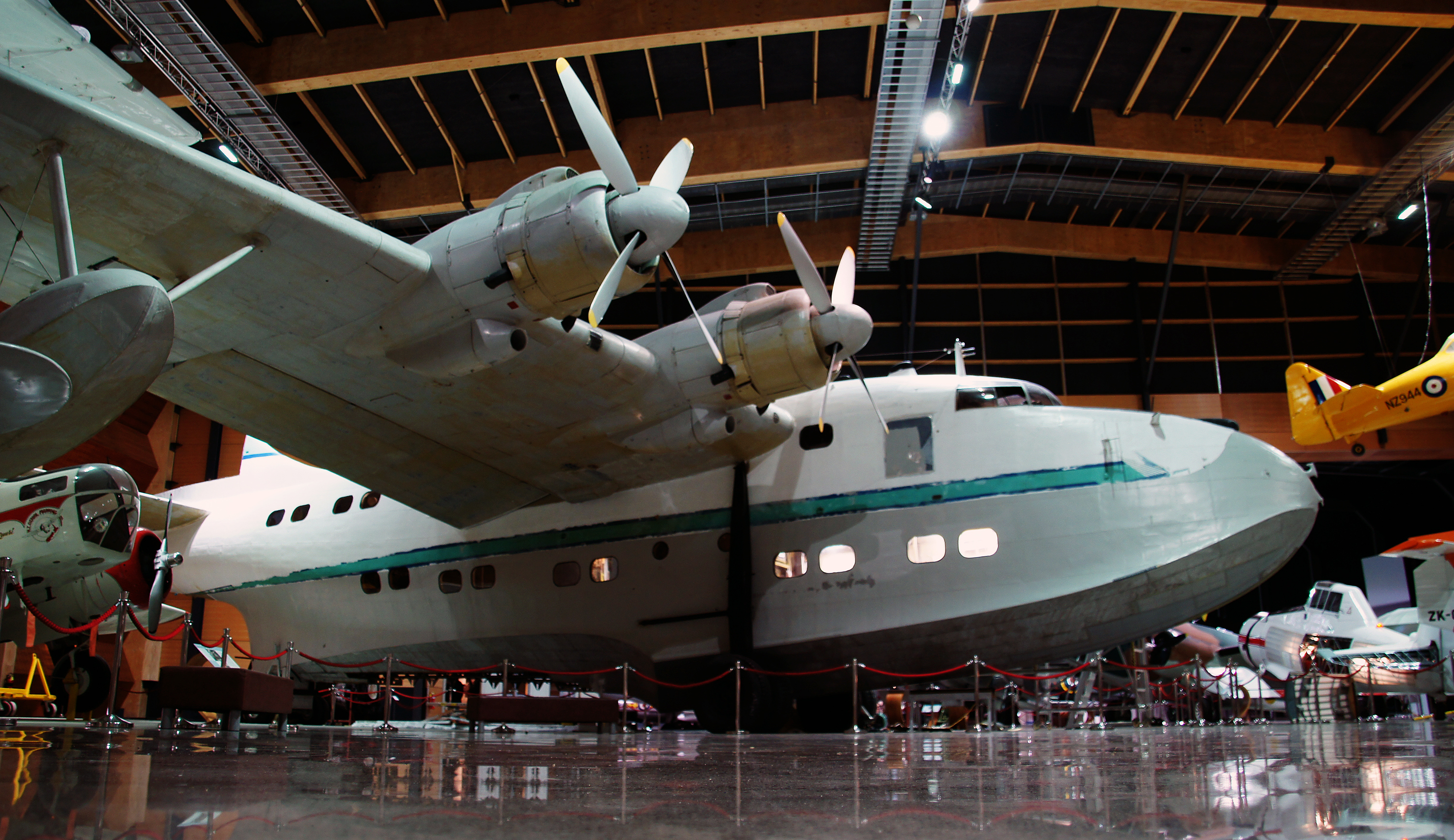
1940 to 1965

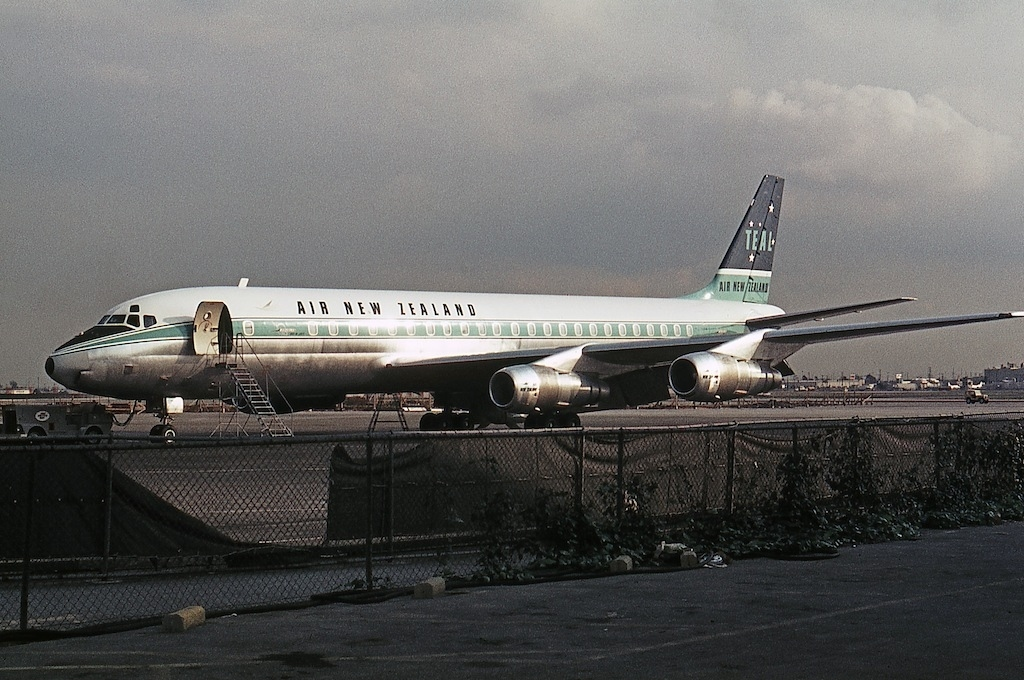
1965 to 1973

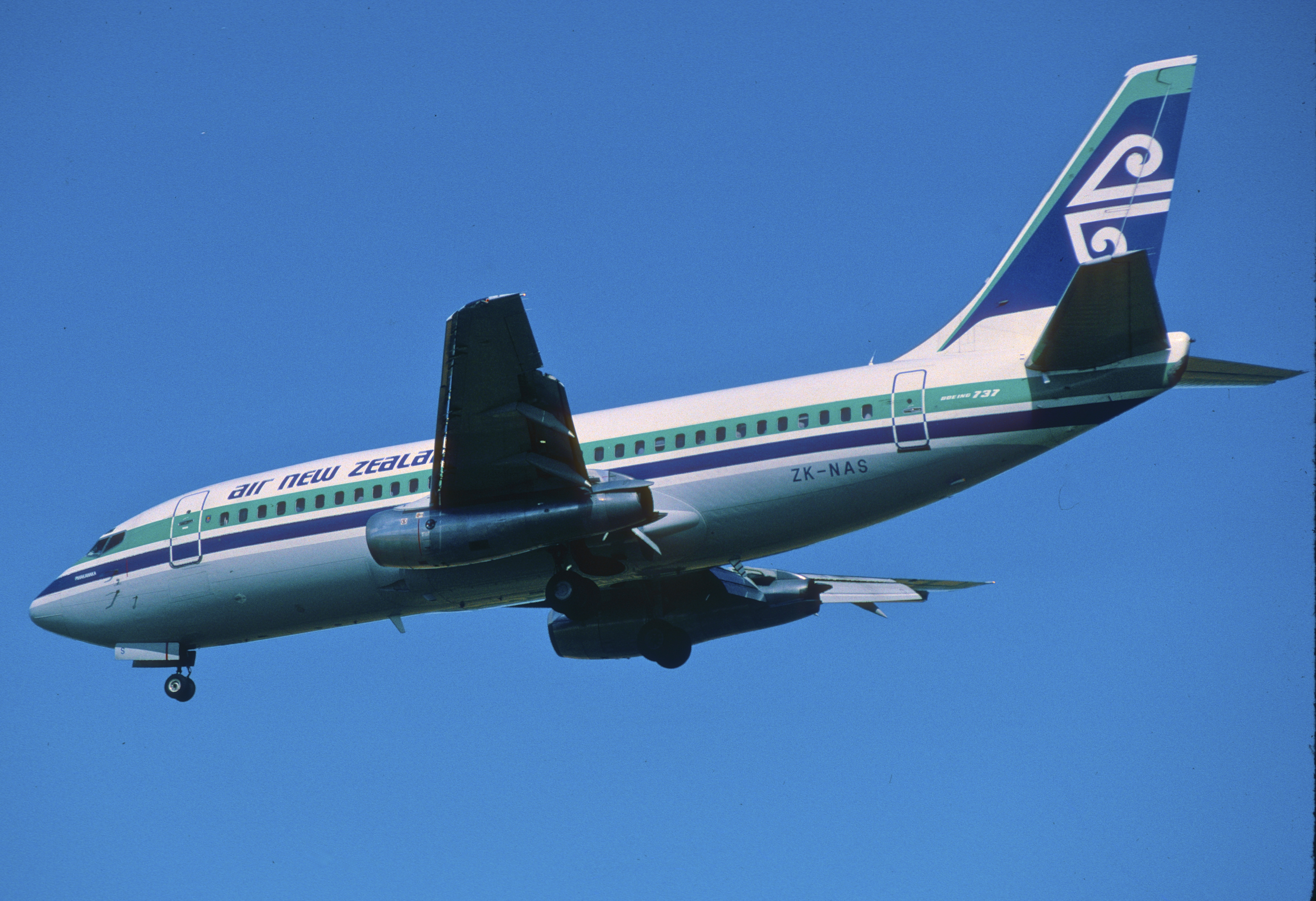
1973 to 1996 (1982 variant)

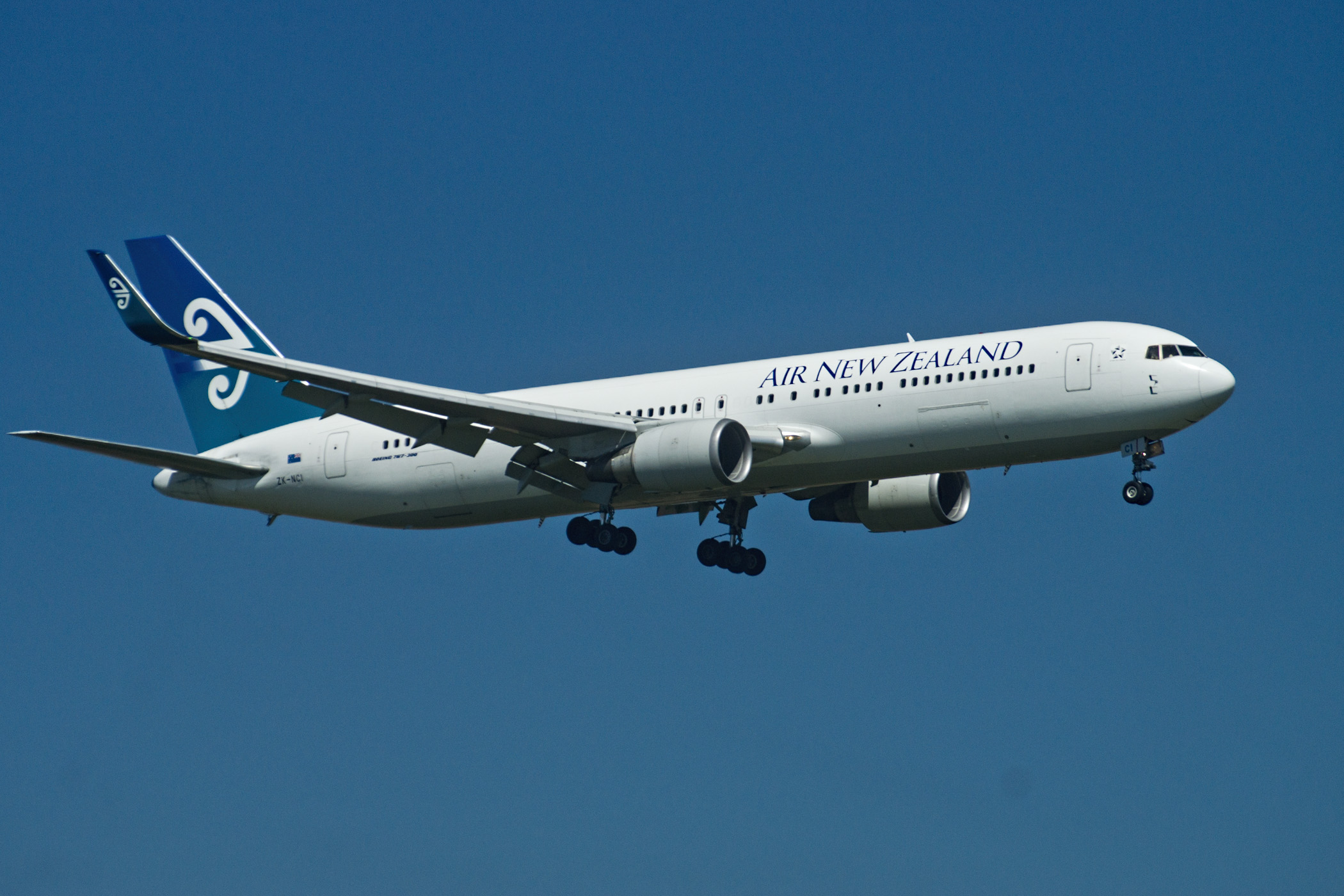
1996 to 2012 (2009 variant)

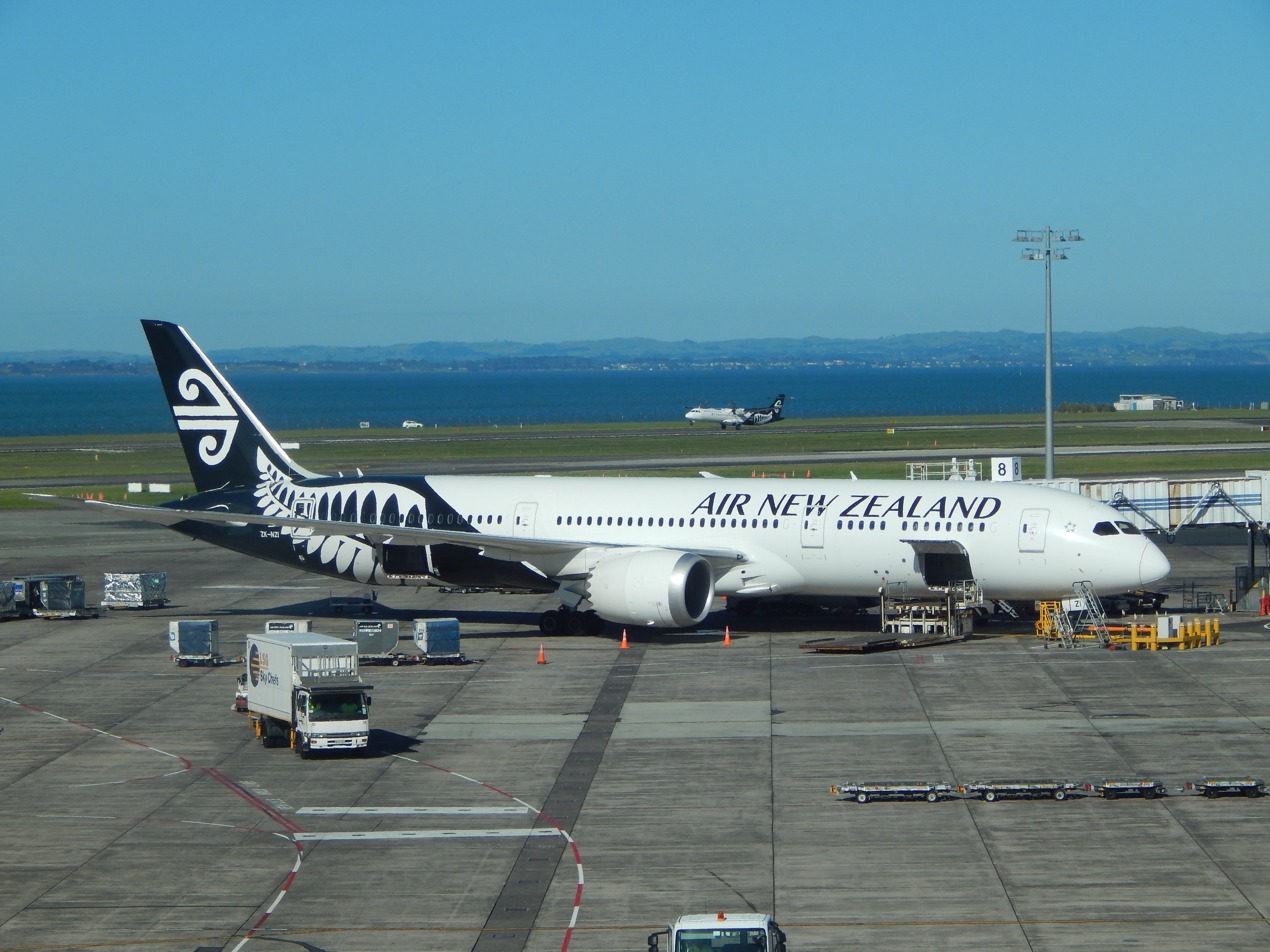
2013 to present

==== Special liveries ====
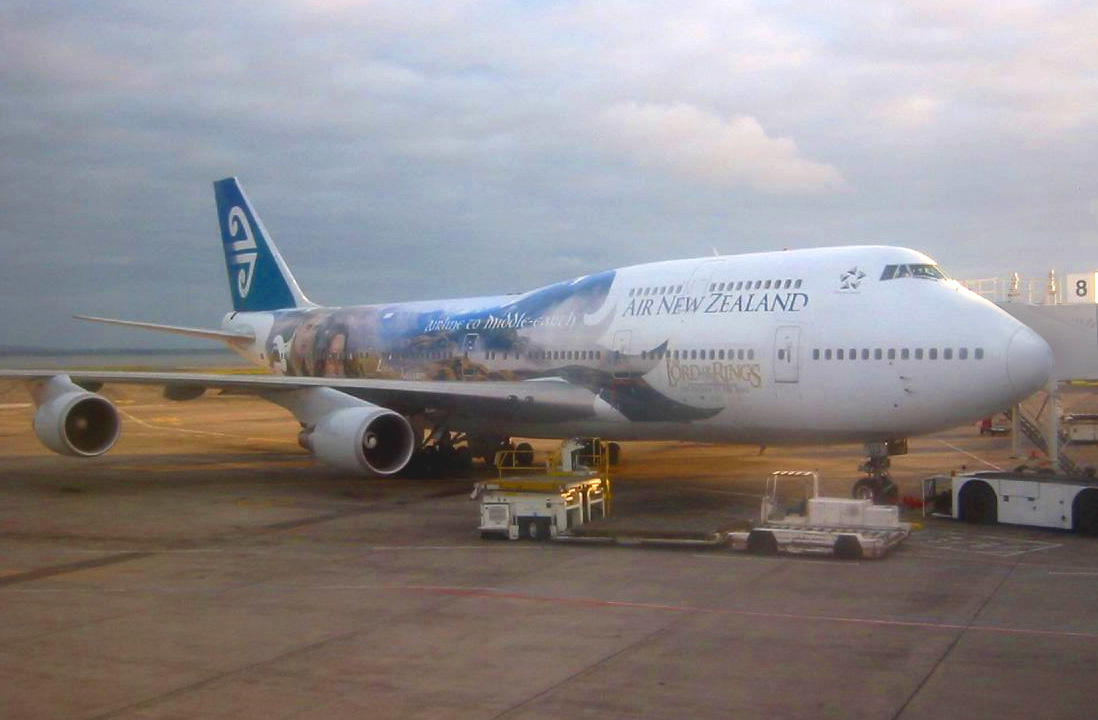
Retired 747-400 ZK-SUJ in "Airline to Middle Earth" livery

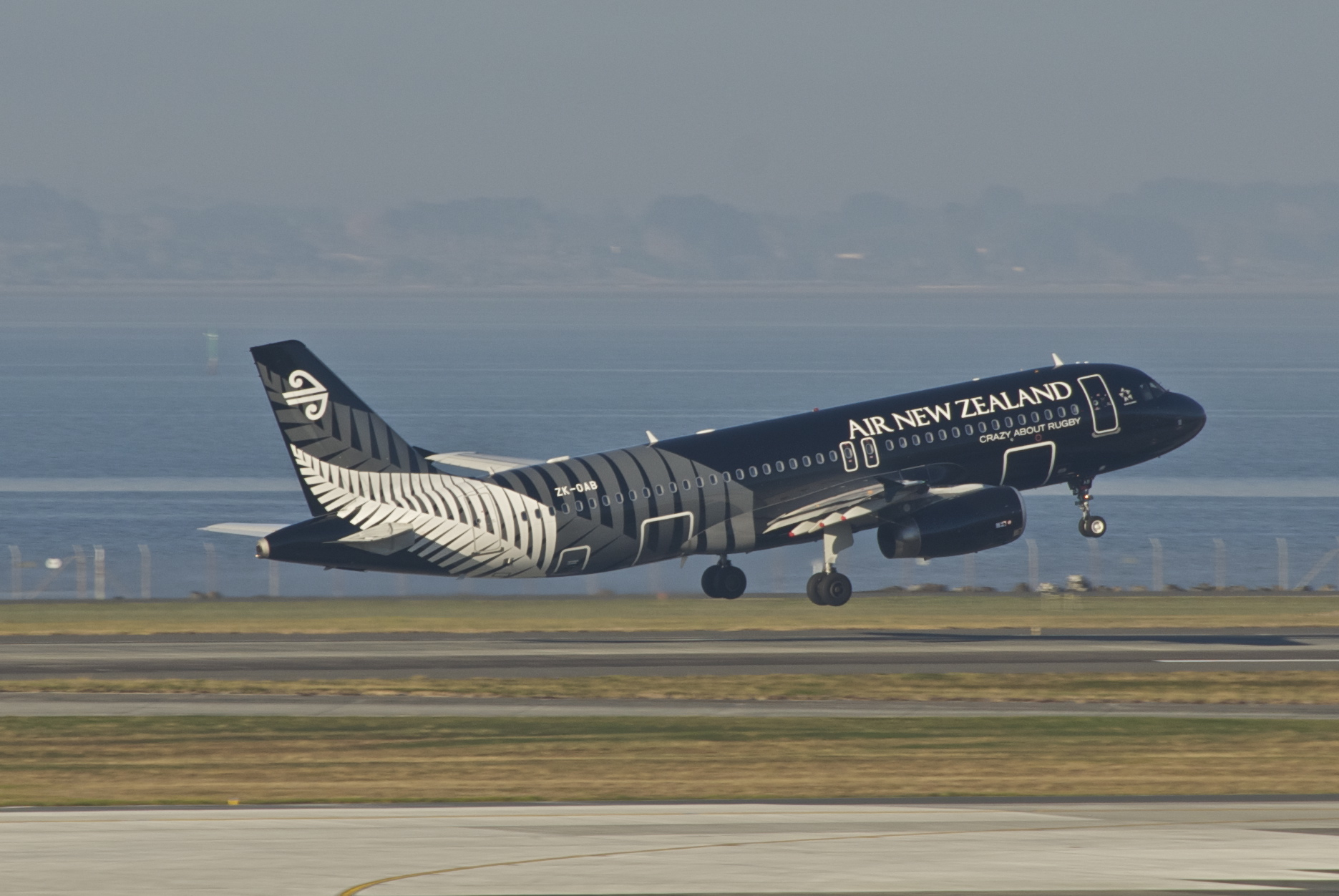
Airbus A320 ZK-OAB at Auckland wearing the All Blacks livery

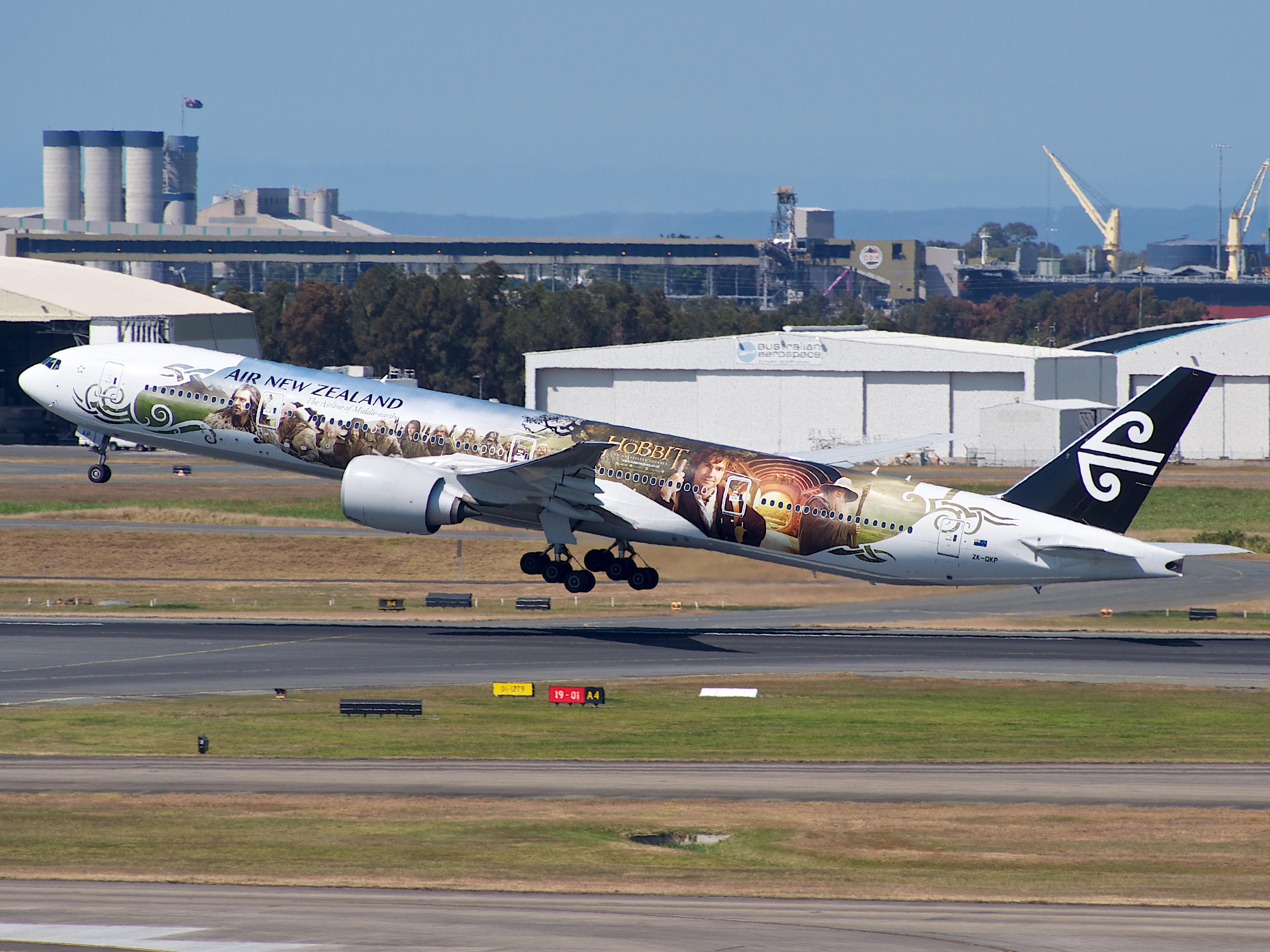
Boeing 777-300ER ZK-OKP with "The Airline of Middle-earth" livery at Brisbane International Airport

- In 1973, the first of the airline's McDonnell Douglas DC-10-30s arrived with 1974 British Commonwealth Games "NZ74" logo on both sides of the forward fuselage beneath the cabin windows.
- In 1984, pictures of the Buckingham Palace horse guards with 'London, Here We Come' were placed on the side of the hump of the airline's new Boeing 747-200Bs when Air New Zealand was allowed to fly the Los Angeles – London leg of the trans-Pacific route in its own name.
- A special livery featuring an image of the All Blacks front row of Carl Hoeft, Anton Oliver and Kees Meeuws and a black tail was used on the Boeing 747–400 aircraft used to transport the team to the 1999 Rugby World Cup. Two other aircraft wore the special All Blacks scheme: a Boeing 737-200QC and a Saab 340 of Air Nelson; both these aircraft retained their blue teal tail colours.
- In 1999, one Boeing 737–300 was painted in a 'New Millennium' livery depicting celebrations and the America's Cup regatta that was to be held in 2000.
- In 2002 and 2003 Air New Zealand marked its position as "the official airline to Middle Earth" by decorating three aircraft with The Lord of the Rings imagery, applied as giant decals. The decal material was described in airline publicity as being as thin as clingfilm and weighing more than 60 kilograms (130 lb). The imagery featured actors from the film trilogy The Lord of the Rings against backdrops of New Zealand locations used in the films.
- In 2008, one of the airline's Boeing 737-300s was painted into a lime green Air New Zealand 'Holidays' livery.
- During 2011 and 2012, two aircraft – an Airbus A320 and a Boeing 777-300ER – were painted in an All Blacks-inspired livery. The aircraft were completely black, with a silver fern motif covering the aft section of the fuselage. Some Air New Zealand Link aircraft were also decorated in the scheme: an ATR 72–600 operated by Mount Cook Airline; and two Beechcraft 1900Ds operated by now-defunct subsidiary Eagle Airways.
- In November 2012, Boeing 777-300ER ZK-OKP was repainted in the new "black-tail" livery and fitted with an 830 m^{2} (8,900 sq ft) decal promoting the premiere and release of the first film in The Hobbit trilogy. The decal took six days and 400-man-hours to install.
- In December 2013, ahead of the premiere of the second part of the Hobbit trilogy, The Desolation of Smaug, Air New Zealand applied two 54-metre-long images of the dragon Smaug on the sides of a Boeing 777-300ER.
- In October 2023, Air New Zealand leased an ex Cathay Pacific Boeing 777-367ER ZK-OKU (ex B-KPJ) for three years from Air Lease Corporation. The airliner was painted all white, and features a black koru logo design on the tail, compared to the normal white.

== Destinations ==
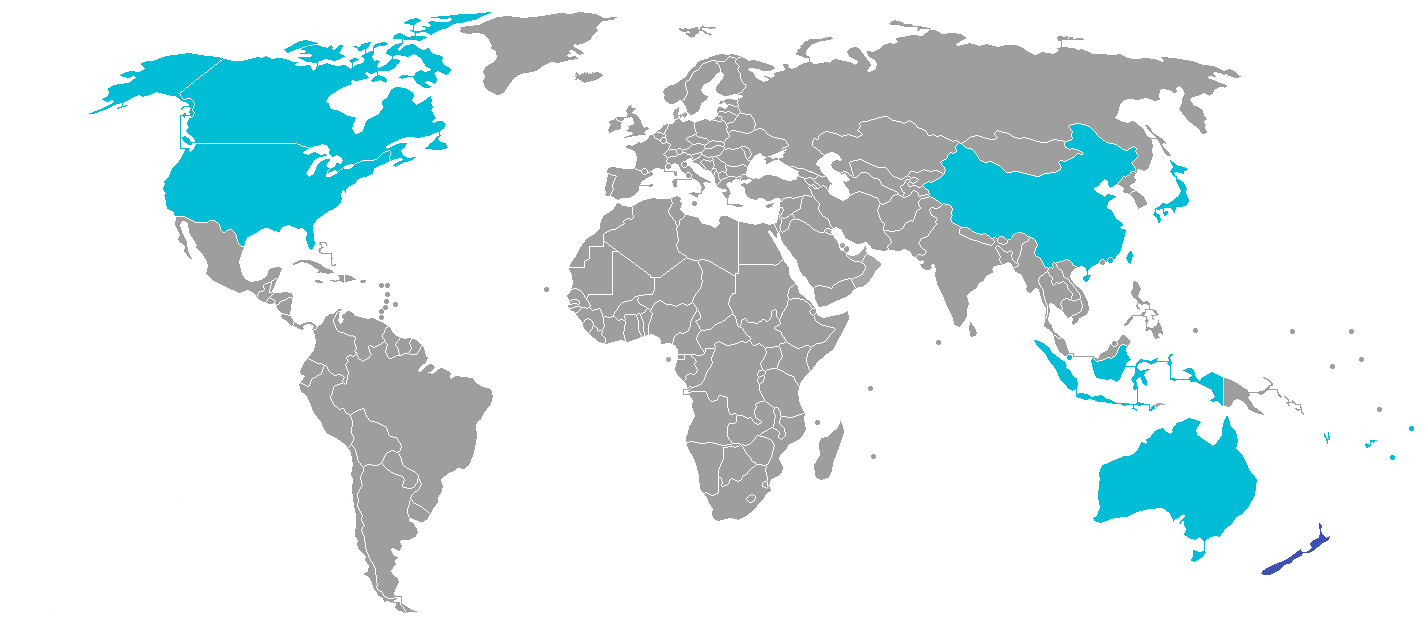
Air New Zealand destinations (August 2025)

Air New Zealand serves 20 domestic and 28 international destinations in countries and territories across Asia, North America and Oceania.

The airline has previously operated several fifth freedom routes, including weekly flights from Rarotonga to Sydney and Los Angeles, twice-weekly services from Sydney and Brisbane to Norfolk Island, and daily flights from Los Angeles to London Heathrow.

=== Joint ventures ===
Air New Zealand has joint venture agreements with the following airlines:

- Air China
- Cathay Pacific
- Singapore Airlines
- United Airlines

=== Codeshare agreements ===
Air New Zealand has codeshare agreements with the following airlines:

- Air Canada
- Air China
- Air India
- Aircalin
- All Nippon Airways
- Asiana Airlines
- Cathay Pacific
- Etihad Airways
- EVA Air
- Lufthansa
- Qantas
- Singapore Airlines
- South African Airways
- Turkish Airlines
- United Airlines
- Virgin Atlantic
- Virgin Australia

=== Interline agreements ===
Air New Zealand has interline agreements with the following airlines:

- Air Chathams
- EVA Air

== Fleet ==
As of September 2025, Air New Zealand operates 115 aircraft. The regional and domestic fleet consists of 17 domestic Airbus A320, 5 domestic Airbus A321neo, 31 regional ATR 72–600 aircraft and 23 regional De Havilland Canada Dash 8 Q300 aircraft. The international fleet consists of 9 Airbus A321neo and 6 A320neo aircraft for short-haul flights, and ten Boeing 777-300ER and fourteen Boeing 787–9 Dreamliner jet aircraft for long-haul flights. The airline has four Airbus A321neo, five Boeing 787-9 and five Boeing 787-10 aircraft on order.

== Services ==
=== Cabins ===
On all widebody aircraft, Air New Zealand offers three main cabins; businesspremier, premium economy, and economy. The economy skycouch is available on all widebody aircraft, and on retrofitted 787s, the airline offers a businesspremierluxe product. The Skynest will be fitted to incoming 787-9 aircraft from 2026. On all narrowbody and regional aircraft, the airline operates an all-economy layout, with seats with extra legroom available towards the front of all narrowbody aircraft.

=== In-flight Wi-Fi ===
Since October 2017, the airline has been implementing complimentary in-flight Wi-Fi on its aircraft. In February 2024, the airline announced the introduction of free Starlink Wi-Fi on all domestic flights and regional flights operated by the ATR 72-600. The service was expected to be implemented in 2025.

=== Koru Lounge ===
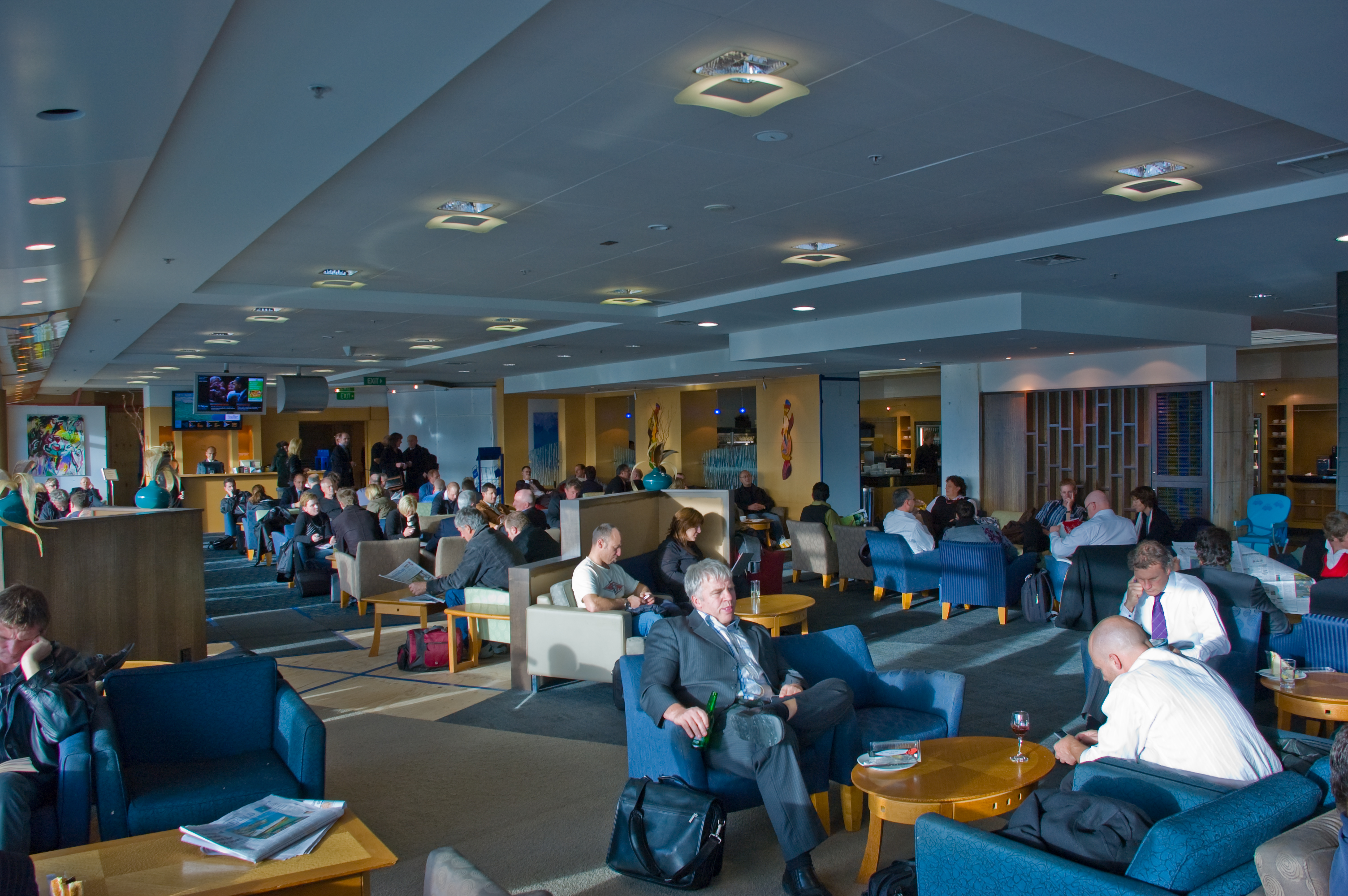
Previous Air New Zealand Koru Lounge in Wellington

The Koru Lounge is Air New Zealand's network of airline lounges in New Zealand, Australia, and selected destinations in the Pacific. Eligible Air New Zealand and Star Alliance frequent flyer members, including Koru Club members and guests, may access the lounges.

=== Koru ===
Koru is Air New Zealand's frequent-flyer programme. Members earn "Airpoints", which can be used to purchase seats on selected Air New Zealand and Star Alliance flights, cabin upgrades, and on items through the Airpoints store. Koru members attain status tiers by accumulating "Status Points", with increasing privileges based on tier levels. Koru Silver is the equivalent of Star Alliance Silver, while Koru Gold, Platinum, and Black are equivalent to Star Alliance Gold.

== Incidents and accidents ==
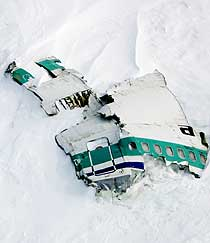
Wreckage of Flight 901

As of November 2022, Air New Zealand has had six hull losses and two hijackings (including TEAL and Air New Zealand Link). The airline's worst accident, and only jet accident with passenger fatalities, was Flight 901 on 28 November 1979, which crashed into Mount Erebus on a sightseeing flight over Antarctica, killing all 257 on board.

- On 27 March 1965, Akaroa, a Lockheed L-188 Electra registered ZK-TEC, crashed at Whenuapai during a training flight. All 6 occupants survived, but the aircraft was destroyed.
- On 4 July 1966, a Douglas DC-8-52 with the registration ZK-NZB crashed at Auckland International Airport shortly after taking off on a training flight, killing the pilot and flight engineer of the five person crew (no passengers were on board). The crew had simulated a failure of the No. 4 engine (the outer engine on the right wing) by bringing the cockpit power control lever to the idle position but inadvertently selected reverse thrust, which sent the aircraft out of control.
- On 22 December 1978, a light aircraft became lost over the Pacific Ocean and the crew of a McDonnell Douglas DC-10 operating as Air New Zealand Flight 103 was asked to search for it. They successfully found it using a technical navigation method, with the help of an oil rig under tow. The captain then released a thin stream of fuel out of the DC-10's fuel dump tube creating a ten-mile-long vapour trail in the direction of Norfolk Island for the light aircraft to follow.
- On 17 February 1979, Air New Zealand Flight 4374, a Fokker F27 Friendship registered ZK-NFC, crashed into Manukau Harbour while on final approach. One of the crew and one company staff member were killed.
- On 28 November 1979, Air New Zealand Flight 901, a McDonnell Douglas DC-10-30 on a sightseeing flight over Antarctica, flew into Mount Erebus on Ross Island, killing all 257 people on board. An unannounced change in flight path coordinates by the airline's navigational division the morning of the accident, combined with unique Antarctic weather and conditions, resulted in the aircraft crashing into Mount Erebus when the flight crew thought they were safely flying down McMurdo Sound. The crash and subsequent inquiry resulted in major changes in Air New Zealand's management.
- On 19 May 1987, during the first of Fiji's coups d'état that year, Air New Zealand Flight 24, a Boeing 747-200 flying from Tokyo Narita to Auckland via Nadi, was hijacked at Nadi International Airport, Fiji. An aircraft refueller entered the Boeing 747-200's cockpit and held the captain, first officer and flight engineer hostage for six hours, before the flight engineer managed to distract the hijacker and hit him over the head with a bottle of duty-free whisky. All 105 passengers and 24 crew (including the three hostages) on board were uninjured. Air New Zealand subsequently suspended all of its services to/through Nadi for seven months.
- On 29 March 1995, Air New Zealand Flight 2337, a Beechcraft Queen Air Excalibu from Hamilton to New Plymouth, crashed shortly after takeoff after both engines failed, killing all 6 occupants onboard. The flight was operated by Kiwi West Aviation on contract to Eagle Airways for Air New Zealand.
- On 18 June 2007, Air New Zealand Flight 2300, a Beechcraft 1900D from Timaru to Wellington registered ZK-EAK, suffered a landing gear failure, and belly landed at Woodbourne Airport in Blenheim. The aircraft was substantially damaged, but all 17 occupants survived. The flight was operated by Eagle Airways for Air New Zealand.
- On 8 February 2008, a woman attempted to hijack Air New Zealand Flight 2279 (operated by Eagle Airways for Air New Zealand), a British Aerospace Jetstream from Blenheim to Christchurch, New Zealand. The woman stated she had a bomb on board. Both pilots and one passenger suffered stab injuries. The aircraft landed safely and the woman was arrested. There were no injuries to the other passengers on board. The flight was operated by Air National on contract to Eagle Airways for Air New Zealand.
- On 27 November 2008, XL Airways Germany Flight 888T, an Airbus A320-232, crashed into the Mediterranean Sea near Canet-en-Roussillon on the French coast. The aircraft was an Air New Zealand-owned Airbus A320 leased to XL Airways Germany registered D-AXLA (formerly ZK-OJL), and was undertaking a technical flight immediately prior to a scheduled handover back to Air New Zealand. At the time of the accident, the aircraft was painted in Air New Zealand livery. Seven people — two Germans (the pilot and co-pilot from XL Airways) and five New Zealanders (one pilot, three aircraft engineers and one member of the Civil Aviation Authority of New Zealand) – were killed.

== Controversies ==
=== Outsourcing maintenance ===
On 19 October 2005, Air New Zealand proposed outsourcing most of its heavy maintenance on its long-haul aircraft and engines, which would result in about 600 job losses, mostly in Auckland. Air New Zealand said that there were larger maintenance providers that could provide maintenance work more cheaply due to their large scale. The proposal was estimated to save $48 million over five years and came after many attempts to attract contracts to service other airlines' long-haul aircraft.

Eventually, a union proposal to save some of the remaining jobs was accepted. The proposal included shift and pay changes (most of them pay cuts) which would allow about 300 engineers in Auckland to keep their jobs. 200 were made redundant or resigned.

=== Minor seating policy ===
In November 2005, it was revealed that Air New Zealand (along with Qantas and British Airways) had a policy of not seating adult male passengers next to unaccompanied children. The policy came to light following an incident in 2004 when a man who was seated next to a young boy on a Qantas flight in New Zealand was asked to change seats with a female passenger. A steward informed him that "it was the airline's policy that only women were allowed to sit next to unaccompanied children". Air New Zealand later said it had a similar policy to Qantas.

=== Qantas code-share ===
On 12 April 2006, Air New Zealand and Qantas announced that they had signed a code-share agreement for their trans-Tasman routes and would file for authorisation from the New Zealand Ministry of Transport and the Australian Competition & Consumer Commission (ACCC). The airlines maintained that they were making losses on Tasman routes due to too many empty seats, and that a codeshare would return the routes to profitability. Critics, particularly Wellington, Christchurch and Melbourne Airports, argued that the codeshare flights would lead to reduced passenger choice and higher airfares, and that airports such as Auckland and Sydney would benefit immensely through economic activity services would bring.

On 15 November 2006 Air New Zealand announced it was withdrawing its application after a draft decision by the ACCC to not approve the code-sharing agreement.

On 31 May 2018 Qantas and Air New Zealand announced that "seamless air travel" would be available to their customers through a new code-sharing agreement. The code-share took effect in October 2018.

=== Aiding Saudi military ===
In February 2021, it was reported that Air New Zealand's business unit Gas Turbines had repaired two engines and one power turbine module from vessels belonging to the Royal Saudi Navy. Green Party human rights spokesperson Golriz Ghahraman accused Air New Zealand for being an accomplice to the Saudi Arabian-led intervention in Yemen. New Zealand Prime Minister Jacinda Ardern subsequently ordered the Ministry of Foreign Affairs and Trade to conduct an investigation into Air New Zealand's involvement. The airline reportedly ceased all contractual support to the Saudi military after the matter was made public.

== Alternative propulsion and emissions of greenhouse gases ==
New Zealand emissions of greenhouse gases from aviation

In a 2008 effort to develop an aviation biofuel, Air New Zealand and Boeing researched the jatropha plant to see if it was a viable green alternative to conventional fuel. A two-hour test flight, using a 50–50 mixture of the new biofuel with Jet A-1 feeding a Rolls-Royce RB211 engine of one of the airline's 747-400s, was completed on 30 December 2008. The engine was then removed to be scrutinised and studied to identify any differences between the jatropha blend and regular Jet A-1. No effects to performances were found. The use of jatropha was identified as a possible future fuel but large tracts of low quality land needed to grow the plant would have to be found without impeding other agricultural uses.

In 2022, Air New Zealand adopted a 2030 target to reduce its emissions by almost 29%. In July 2024, Air NZ had announced the withdrawal of its 2030 climate target and that it would also withdraw from the Science Based Targets initiative (SBTi). The Spinoff reported that this raises serious credibility questions for Air New Zealand.

== Bibliography ==
- Martyn, E.W. (1972). New Zealand aviation 100 years. Christchurch: Christchurch Aviation Historical Society.
- Rendel, D. (1975). Civil aviation in New Zealand-An illustrated history. Wellington: A.H. & A.W. Reed.
- Driscoll, I.H. (1979). Airline-The making of a national flag carrier. Auckland: Shortland Publications.
- Ewing, R. (1986). The history of New Zealand aviation. Auckland: Heinemann.
- Rennie, N. (1990). Conquering isolation-The first 50 years of Air New Zealand. Auckland: Heinemann-Reed.
- King, J. (1996). Wings over New Zealand. Mt. Eden (Auckland): Saint Publishing.
- Sheehan, P. (2003). The aircraft of Air New Zealand and its affiliates since 1940. Wellington: Transpress NZ.

== See also ==
- Air transport in New Zealand
- List of airports in New Zealand
- List of airlines of New Zealand
- Transport in New Zealand
