= Sharndré Kushor =

New Zealand businessperson

- Born: 1993/1994

Sharndré Kushor (born 1993/1994) is a New Zealand entrepreneur.

She is known primarily for co-founding Crimson Education alongside Jamie Beaton and Fangzhou Jiang. In 2020 she announced that she had started funding her own charitable foundation called The One Billion.

Kushor studied health sciences at the University of Auckland, and serves as a director at the companies MedView, Play Atlantic, and NumberWorks'nWords.
