= Crimson Global Academy =

Online private high school based in New Zealand

- New Zealand

Information
- Type: Private online high school
- Established: 2019

Crimson Global Academy (CGA) is a private online high school founded in New Zealand in 2019 by Jamie Beaton and Crimson Education. It offers Cambridge International IGCSE and A Levels, Pearson Edexcel qualifications, Advanced Placement subjects, and a United States High School Diploma.

== Accreditation ==
The school is accredited by the Accrediting Commission for Schools, WASC, listed as a Cambridge International School, and operates as a Pearson Edexcel examination centre and College Board member.
