= The Icehouse (business growth centre) =

Business education nonprofit in New Zealand

The Icehouse is a business growth centre that establishes learning environments for New Zealand SME business owners, entrepreneurs and founders. The Icehouse provides training and development workshops for New Zealand-based SME owner managed companies to develop business skills. The current Group CEO of The Icehouse is Gavin Lennox.

In 2019, the various startup and investment activities of the Icehouse were spun off into a separate venture capital business called Icehouse Ventures, which operates New Zealand's largest group of angel investors.

The Icehouse is owned by a not-for-profit trust (The ICE Foundation). The Foundation provides sponsorships, academic research grants and community projects that support entrepreneurship and innovation in New Zealand.

== Awards ==
The Icehouse won the Education Category in 2009 Vero Excellence in Business Support Awards

In May 2010, Forbes names The Icehouse as a top-ten technology incubator changing the world.

== Notable publications ==
Irving, D et al. (2009). Changing Gears: How to Take Your Kiwi Business From the Kitchen Table to the Board Room, Auckland University Press
