= JACDEC =

Jet Airliner Crash Data Evaluation Centre
- Type: Commercial company
- Industry: Aviation safety analysis

Jet Airliner Crash Data Evaluation Centre (JACDEC) is a company that provides commercial aviation safety analysis.

The company promotes the ‘JACDEC Safety Index’, a rating system developed from the company's proprietary database. The JACDEC Centre also monitors current safety occurrences and provides updates on airline safety issues on several social networks.

The ratings take into account the number and fatality rate of the hull losses (destroyed aircraft) they have suffered in the past 30 years, more recent safety data, and number of flights flown without incident. These results, however, do not take into account the cause of the hull losses or whether the airline is at fault.

== JACDEC Airline Safety Ranking ==
Since 2002, JACDEC has published an annual ranking of the "Safest 60 Airlines". The index rating, JACDEC distinguishes whether an event is a total loss or a serious incident: Both will be recorded in the JACDEC Database, but in the final weighting, a total loss counts considerably more. The term "total loss" means that any repair costs of accident damage exceed the residual value of the aircraft or the aircraft was destroyed. JACDEC includes only flights where paying passengers were on board. Therefore, all freight– ferry, training, or maintenance flights– are disregarded.JACDEC considers the operational environment as one important factor for an airline's safety performance. The results of this investigation are published and can be viewed by everyone.

Safest Airlines 2018 (Based on 2017 values)
Rank	Airline	Country	Index
1	Emirates	United Arab Emirates	93.61
2	Norwegian	Norway	93.26
3	Virgin Atlantic	United Kingdom	92.87
4	KLM	Netherlands	92.77
5	EasyJet	United Kingdom	92.75
6	Finnair	Finland	92.67
7	Etihad Airways	United Arab Emirates	92.56
8	Spirit Airlines	United States of America	92.18
9	Jetstar	Australia	92.12
10	Air Arabia	United Arab Emirates	92.09

Least Safe Airlines 2018 (Based on 2017 values)
Rank	Airline	Country	Index
1	Blue Wing Airlines	Suriname	XX.XX
2	Iraqi Airways	Iraq	XX.XX
3	Iran Aseman Airlines	Iran	XX.XX
4	Med-View Airline	Nigeria	XX.XX
5	Mustique Airways	Saint Vincent and the Grenadines	XX.XX

== Controversies ==
JACDEC's methodology was criticized by Cathay Pacific – which had been ranked 12th in 2018 – as being unreliable and not transparent.

The inaccuracy of the company's indexing has been debated after a list was issued for the German Newspaper Bild's website after the crash of Air France Flight 447, displaying the safety index of the world's 60 biggest airlines.

JACDEC's 2013 report was heavily criticized by Air India, after it was named as the 3rd least safe airline. The report stated that for the 30 year period, Air India had 3 hull losses, while the airline reported that it had only one fatal crash and hull loss of Air India Flight 182 in that timeframe that resulted in 329 fatalities, which was caused by an act of terrorism and not a safety factor.
