= Crimson Education =

For-profit college-prep company

Crimson Education is a multinational university admissions consultancy headquartered in Auckland, New Zealand.

The business specializes in providing college-prep services focused toward students gaining admission at elite universities including Ivy League institutions. Crimson’s programs cost upwards of USD $25,000, with some families paying close to USD $200,000 to work with the firm's co-founders.

Crimson Education also operates an online high school, the Crimson Global Academy which Niche.com has ranked #4 in the US for online high schools and #273 among all US private high schools.

According to the Wall Street Journal, “Crimson Education is valued at $554 million, with key investors including Tiger Management, Icehouse Ventures, and Verlinvest. The firm has raised $75 million over five funding rounds.” As of 2024 the company is privately held, with a post-money valuation of around NZ $1B following a 2022 funding round.

The company is heavily branded around Jamie Beaton, one of its founders. Crimson Education currently operates in 21 key markets and has 26 offices around the world, including Auckland, Shanghai, New Delhi, Hong Kong, Dubai, Jakarta, London, Singapore, Sydney, Taipei and New York City.

== History ==
=== 2013–2016 ===
The business was founded in 2013 by New Zealander then-teenagers Jamie Beaton, Fangzhou Jiang, and Sharndre Kushor. The three co-founders met at Model United Nations conferences while they were in high school. The business was initially conceived as a college-prep consultancy. It grew substantially after an initial funding round of NZ$1.4m raised from Julian Robertson, Chase Coleman, and Alex Robertson (all associated with Tiger Management); as well as from Japanese tutoring billionaire Soichiro Fukutake. Crimson was also supported by New Zealand based venture capital fund Icehouse.

The company acquired prep firms Medview and Unitutor in 2015 and also acquired tutoring enterprise NumberWorks'nWords in 2016.

A 2016 funding round funding round implied a post-money valuation of NZ$75m, with Beaton the largest shareholder.

Crimson Education partnered with private Christchurch girls’ school Rangi Ruru in what was reported to be “the first partnership of its kind between a school and a commercial enterprise in New Zealand.”

Later in 2016, it was reported that the company had raised a further NZ$41 million, implying a valuation of NZ$220 million.

=== 2017–2018 ===
One of the co-founders of the company, Jiang, was New Zealand’s winner at the Global Student Entrepreneurs’ Awards for his role in establishing the company.

=== 2019–2020 ===
In late 2019, it was reported that the company had raised a further NZ$31.5m from investors, including from a Hong Kong based firm and affiliate of the Chow Tai Fook conglomerate CTF Education Group, and from South Korean firm Solborn. Crimson had offices in Kazakhstan and Brazil, and planned to use the additional investment to expand into Asia. At the same time, the company was criticized for not being transparent. The new investment reportedly valued Crimson Education at NZ$410m.

The New Zealand Herald reported that the company had hired former New Zealand Prime Minister John Key as an “advisory member” to its board. It also reported that the firm had started a high school called Crimson Global Academy which had been registered with the Ministry of Education. The business later offered its support to the Ministry of Education to help other schools transition to online classes in the wake of the COVID-19 pandemic. The school was also launched in South Africa in 2020.

In 2019, Crimson Education launched the Crimson Global Academy (CGA).

In August 2020, the firm entered into a partnership with U.S. News & World Report, a multifaceted digital media outlet for news and information.

=== 2021–2022 ===
In 2021, Crimson acquired Unfiltered, a video platform providing exclusive interviews and insights from world leaders in business and entrepreneurship. It was later reported that Crimson paid US$60,000 for the platform.

Former Australian Prime Minister Kevin Rudd also joined the advisory board of Crimson Global Academy, alongside John Key. The company was reportedly valued at NZ$656m after investment from Australian-investment fund Heal Partners and The Warehouse founder Sir Stephen Tindall. As of August 2021, Crimson Education had 430 students across 23 countries, as well as 70 teachers and 2,000 mentors.

In September 2021, the Australian Financial Review reported that the company was contemplating an initial public offering.

In 2022, a post-money valuation of US$550 million was obtained after a capital raise.

The Australian Financial Review has reported that, in 2022, the business had 630 full-time staff and around 3,000 tutors and mentors.

=== 2023–2024 ===
In 2024, the company teamed up with University of Pennsylvania to offer a Certificate Program in Global Entrepreneurship and Innovation.

In July 2024, it was reported that the business had completed a 'stealth round' and raised further capital. Crimson applied for an online charter school under the charter school model reintroduced by the New Zealand Government in 2024. Its application to open a charter school called Aotearoa Infinite Academy had not been accepted to open early in 2025, though it may be able to open later on in the year.

As of 2024, Crimson Education was working with around 8,000 clients across six grade levels, including students applying to U.S. colleges.

In November 2024, the company closed its Series D capital raise at an NZ$1 billion valuation, taking in investment from Australian investment fund Heal Partners, New Zealand-based venture capital fund Movac, Icehouse Ventures and others. The New Zealand Herald and the Australian Financial Review dubbed Crimson a "unicorn." Following this, the company said it was big enough to IPO on the ASX. Crimson’s annual revenue for FY2024 exceeded US$100 million (A$151m) and the company is profitable.

=== 2025–2026 ===
In February 2026, John Key was appointed chairman of the company’s board, having previously served as an advisory board member. At the same time, Sundeep Jain—former chief product officer of Uber and a former Google vice-president of product—was appointed to the board. Company leadership indicated that an initial public offering (IPO) in Australia or the United States was under consideration, though no listing had been confirmed.

== Controversies ==
In 2017, Crimson Education was involved in a breach of contract litigation with a former employee. The matter was eventually subject to a confidential settlement. In 2018, the University of Auckland filed a suit against a Crimson Education subsidiary, alleging breach of copyright. The suit was eventually settled.

In January 2021 it was reported that a $10-million High Court lawsuit had been filed by a competitor of Crimson involving allegations of employee poaching. Beaton had also filed a civil assault claim against the owner of that competitor. The business chose not to comment on the assault claim filed by Beaton. Crimson stated it was not unusual for companies like it to "experience some commercial litigation". In May 2022, media reported that the parties reached a confidential settlement.

Crimson has drawn criticism over their termination clause which only allows termination in very limited circumstances. Customers wanting to withdraw are often locked in with their obligation to continue paying the fees. Consumer NZ said it believed the allegedly unfair termination clause, “no warranty”, and Crimson’s right to change the contract at any time should be questioned.

USA Today and the NZ news website Stuff has accused the company of running "ghost offices" and relying on untrained tutors. Crimson rejected these accusations. NZ news website The Spinoff reported on push-back Crimson received from Rhodes Scholars after Beaton attempted to recruit them to work for Crimson. A spokesperson for Rhodes House confirmed that a number of Rhodes Scholars provide mentorship through Crimson's platform, but that none provided paid advice on the interview process.

== See also ==
- Jamie Beaton
- Sharndre Kushor
- Educational consultant
- Crimson Global Academy
