= Jamie Beaton =

New Zealand businessperson

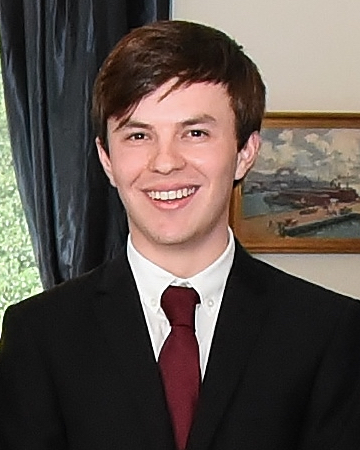
- Beaton in 2017
- Born: 1995 or 1996 (age 30–31); Auckland, New Zealand
- Education: Harvard University (BA, MS); Stanford University (MBA, MEd); St John's College, Oxford (DPhil); Tsinghua University (MA); University of Pennsylvania (MS); Yale University (JD); Princeton University (MFin); King's College London (MA); Cornell University (MS); Dartmouth College (MS); Columbia University (MS)
- Occupations: Educational entrepreneur and perpetual student
- Years active: 2013–present
- Title: Co-founder and CEO of Crimson Education

Jamie John Brendan Beaton (born 1995/1996) is a New Zealand entrepreneur and academic who founded Crimson Education. In 2016, he graduated from Harvard University with a master's degree in applied mathematics. In 2022, a venture capital fund valued Crimson Education at US$550 million.

Beaton is also known for his accrual of over a dozen advanced degrees, including an MBA from Stanford, a law degree from Yale, a public policy PhD from Oxford, and several masters degrees.

== Early life and education ==
Jamie Beaton was born and raised in Auckland. His parents were property managers. He attended King's College, Auckland on an academic scholarship. Beaton graduated with a bachelor's degree and master's degree in applied mathematics from Harvard University in 2016 after three years of study. He also has two degrees from Stanford University (one in business and one in education) and a master's degree in global affairs from Tsinghua University in Beijing. In 2023, he received his Juris Doctor from Yale Law School. He attended the University of Oxford as a Rhodes Scholar, earning a doctor of philosophy in public policy at St John's College. He also earned a Master of Health Policy and Economics at Cornell Medical School, a Masters of Science in Journalism from Columbia University Graduate School of Journalism, and a Master of Science in Implementation Science from Geisel School of Medicine.

In June 2024, Beaton drew attention online after users circulated a screenshot of the education section of his LinkedIn profile. Beaton has earned degrees from several internationally prominent universities including Harvard, Tsinghua, and Stanford. In response to criticism Beaton was simply accumulating credentials, Beaton said that his degrees were not collected for their own sake, but reflected different stages of his academic and professional development.

== Career ==
In 2013, Beaton founded Crimson Education, a university and college admission preparation company, with Fangzhou Jiang and Sharndré Kushor. The business attracted investments of approximately NZ$1.4 million. Hedge fund managers Julian Robertson and Chase Coleman, as well as Alex Robertson and Soichiro Fukutake, were the primary initial investors. Customers of Crimson Education have reported paying thousands of dollars for tutoring services when attempting to gain entry to an Ivy League school.

As of 2022, the business had 630 full-time staff and more than 3,000 tutors and mentors. In the same year a capital raise by a venture capital fund valued the company at US$550 million. In 2024, the company was valued at $1 billion after a Series D funding.

In 2023, Beaton was named New Zealand's Young Entrepreneur of the Year, and in 2026 he was named New Zealand's Entrepreneur of the Year, in the EY Entrepreneur of the Year Awards.

=== Lawsuits ===
In 2017, Crimson Education was involved in a breach of contract litigation with a former employee. The matter was eventually subject to a confidential settlement. In 2018, the University of Auckland filed a suit against a Crimson Education subsidiary, alleging breach of copyright. The suit was eventually settled.

In January 2021 it was reported that a $10-million High Court lawsuit had been filed by a competitor of Crimson involving allegations of employee poaching. Beaton had also filed a civil assault claim against the owner of that competitor. Crimson Education chose not to comment on the assault claim filed by Beaton. Crimson stated it was not unusual for companies like Crimson to "experience some commercial litigation". In May 2022, media reported that the parties reached a confidential settlement.

== Personal life ==
Beaton was in a relationship with Crimson Education co-founder Sharndré Kushor. Beaton and Kushor met during their secondary education at a Model United Nations conference. As of 2022, they were no longer in a relationship. He met his wife, Priscilla, at Columbia University’s Graduate School of Journalism; they were married in July 2026 in Los Angeles, with former New Zealand Prime Minister John Key officiating the wedding.

Beaton sat on the review panel of the centre-right New Zealand National Party election campaign after the party lost the 2020 election.

In 2025, Beaton was listed in 112th place on the NBR Rich List, with an estimated net worth of $220 million.

== See also ==
- Perpetual student
