= Icehouse Ventures =

New Zealand venture capital firm

- Type: Private
- Industry: Venture capital
- Founded: 2019; 7 years ago
- Headquarters: Auckland, New Zealand
- Area served: New Zealand
- Products: Investments
- AUM: $1 billion
- Website: www.icehouseventures.co.nz

Icehouse Ventures is a New Zealand-based venture capital firm. The firm is headquartered in Auckland and mainly focuses on the technology industry and has backed 200 companies. The firm also operates a variety of angel groups networks such as Ice Angels and Arc Angels. Icehouse Ventures was formally founded in 2019 as a separate company but had operated as part of the Icehouse group since 2001. In 2019, the founding CEO of the Icehouse stepped down as CEO and joined the board of directors of Icehouse Ventures.

Icehouse Ventures receives funding from government agency Callaghan Innovation to provide a founder incubator service to the founders of new startup businesses in New Zealand.

== History ==
The Icehouse was founded in 2001 with a mandate to encourage innovation and entrepreneurship in New Zealand. The organisation was a joint venture between Auckland University and private sector partners. To also support innovation and entrepreneurship by connecting existing SME businesses with new startups the group also added a coworking space, business incubator, and angel network. The group hosted and operated the first Lightning Lab cohorts in Auckland in 2015 and 2016.

The organisation has managed and operated the Ice Angels angel network since 2001. In 2015, the organisation added an internship programme for young students interested in angel investing and venture capital. In 2016, the student programme was expanded into a student-led venture capital fund called Firstcut Ventures, that is managed by Icehouse Ventures in partnership with a group of university students. The fund invests in founders under 30.

Icehouse Ventures was spun out of the Icehouse in 2019 and received external investment into the operating company from 44 investors including KiwiSaver operator Simplicity. Venture capital funds were also added such as the Tuhua Fund and Eden Fund.

In April 2020, Stuff published an article critical of support that the Eden Fund investor network (operated by Icehouse Ventures) had provided to communities in China impacted by COVID-19. The article was found by the Media Council to be inaccurate and unfair.

In September 2020, Icehouse Ventures acquired a stake in the research and development incubator Level Two which works with deep-tech and Clean technology companies. Icehouse Ventures operates the Level Two fund and provides nominee, investment operations and funds management to Level Two.

In 2021, Icehouse Ventures launched IVX, a later-stage venture fund intended to allow the firm to continue investing in companies beyond their early-stage funding rounds. The fund targeted $75 million and had secured more than $50 million in commitments at its launch, with investors including Simplicity, Sir Stephen Tindall's K1W1 and Hobson Wealth.

In April 2022, the firm launched a special fund called ArcAngels Fund II to invest in female-founded and led ventures. The fund had an initial close of $5 million and planned to invest in up to 50 companies over four years. Its cornerstone investors included businesswoman Theresa Gattung, Vend co-founder Mel Roswell and K1W1.

== Investments ==
Icehouse Ventures invests in early-stage private companies. It specialises in incubation, seed stage, startup stage, early stage, and growth stage investments in private companies. The firm also operates funds that invest in later stage companies by using the pro rata rights gained during earlier investments.

Among companies backed by Icehouse Ventures are Halter, Sharesies, Dawn Aerospace, Hnry, Crimson Education, Tracksuit, Mint Innovation and Tradify. In 2024, UK software company The Access Group acquired Tradify. Icehouse Ventures held approximately 9.2 per cent of the company at the time of its acquisition.
