= Med-View Airline =

Nigerian airline headquartered in Lagos

IATA	ICAO	Call sign
VL	MEV	MED-VIEW
- Founded: 2004
- Ceased operations: 2019
- Hubs: Murtala Muhammed International Airport
- Fleet size: 4
- Destinations: 13
- Headquarters: Lagos, Nigeria

Med-View Airline was a Nigerian airline headquartered and based in Lagos.

== History ==
The airline was founded in 2007 as a charter airline, mainly operating Hajj flights, and has offered domestic passenger services since November 2012. It had since expanded into regional and long-haul scheduled passenger routes. Med-View Airline Plc was listed on the Nigerian Stock Exchange on 31 January 2017.

The airline laid off 90% of its employees between November 2017 and June 2018. Med-View Airline sacked and owes existing workers at least N1.5billion in salary arrears, pension and other entitlements. In April 2018, Medview Airline suspended international flight operations mostly due to debts and decreased aircraft. By October 2018, Medview had reportedly sacked over 100 staff, some of whom were owed about 6 months' salaries. As of August 2019 Medview reportedly shutdown all operations as its only operating aircraft went out of service. The airline was the only Nigerian airline to be listed in the list of air carriers banned in the European Union.

As of November 2022, Nigerian authorities confirmed that the airline no longer holds a valid air operator certificate.

== Destinations ==
As of February 2015, Med-View Airline had operated nine domestic and nine international scheduled destinations in states across Nigeria, West Africa, Europe, and the Middle East:

Hub
Future
Terminated route
Suspended route

City	Country	IATA	ICAO	Airport	Refs
Abuja	Nigeria	ABV	DNAA	Nnamdi Azikiwe International Airport	
Abidjan	Ivory Coast	ABJ	DIAP	Port Bouet Airport	
Accra	Ghana	ACC	DGAA	Accra International Airport	
Conakry	Guinea	CKY	GUCY	Conakry International Airport	
Dakar	Senegal	DKR	GOOY	Léopold Sédar Senghor International Airport	
Dubai	UAE	DXB	OMDB	Dubai International Airport	
Enugu	Nigeria	ENU	DNEN	Akanu Ibiam International Airport	
Freetown	Sierra Leone	FNA	GFLL	Lungi International	
Ilorin	Nigeria	ILR	DNIL	Ilorin International Airport	
Kano	Nigeria	KAN	DNKN	Mallam Aminu Kano International Airport	
Lagos	Nigeria	LOS	DNMM	Murtala Muhammed International Airport	
London	United Kingdom	LGW	EGKK	London Gatwick Airport	
Maiduguri	Nigeria	MIU	DNMA	Maiduguri International	
Monrovia	Liberia	ROB	GLRB	Roberts International (Roberts Field)	
Owerri	Nigeria	QOW	DNIM	Sam Mbakwe Airport	
Port Harcourt	Nigeria	PHC	DNPO	Port Harcourt International Airport	
Yola	Nigeria	YOL	DNYO	Yola Airport	

== Fleet ==
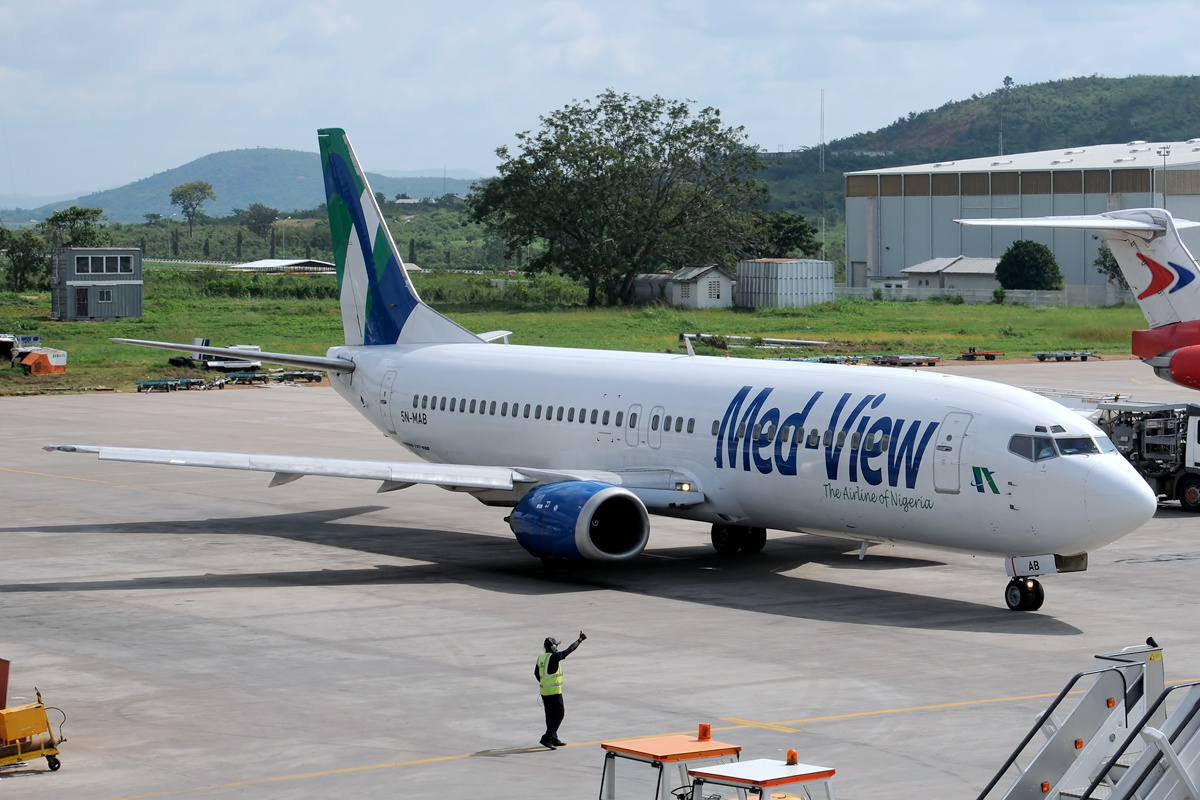
Med-View Airline Boeing 737-400

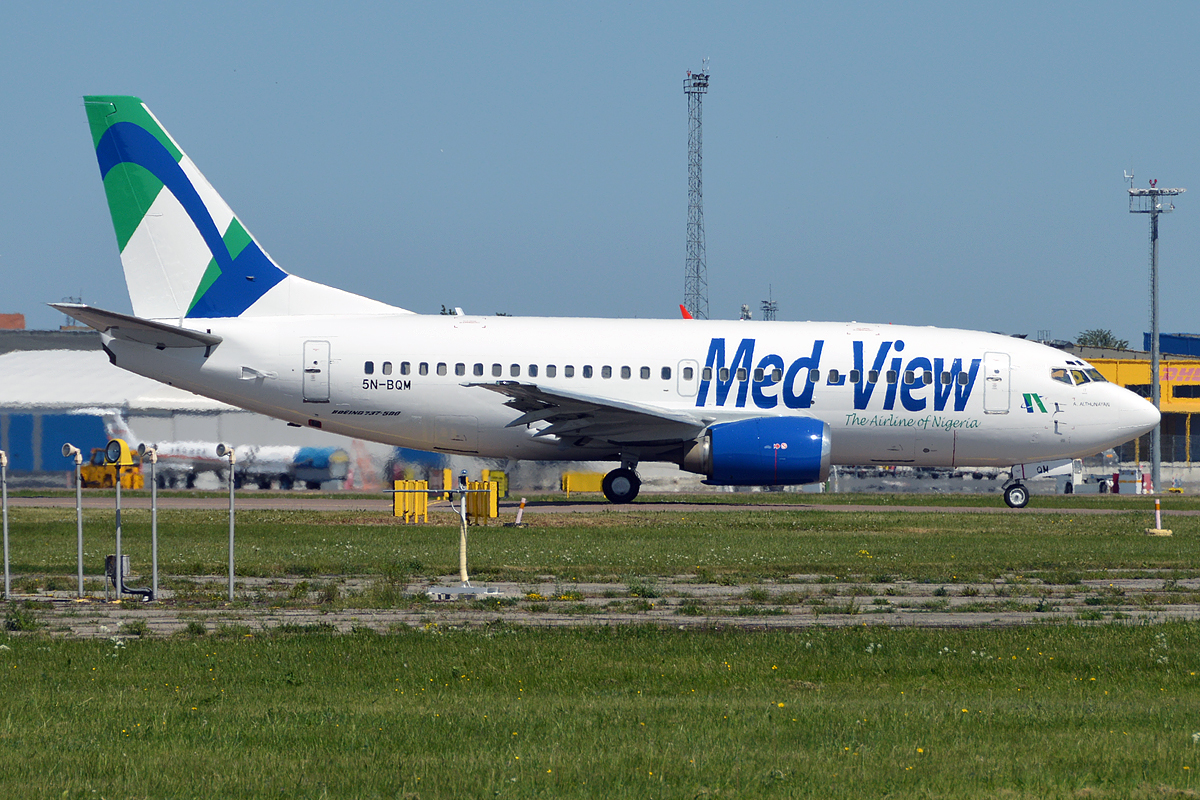
Med-View Airlines Boeing 737-500

The Med-View Airline fleet includes the following aircraft as of February 2021:

Med-View Airline fleet
Aircraft	In service	Orders	Passengers			Notes
Aircraft	In service	Orders	C	Y	Total	Notes
Boeing 737-400	2	—	—	168	168	
Boeing 737-500	1	—	—	120	120	
Boeing 777-200ER	1	—	38	285	323	
Total	4	—				
