= Elizabeth Ellis Hoyt =

American economist (1893–1980)

- Born: January 27, 1893; Augusta, Maine, US
- Died: November 22, 1980 (aged 87); Gleneden Beach, Oregon, US
- Resting place: Ocean Hill Cemetery at Long Cove in Bristol, Maine
- Education: Boston College (AB); Radcliffe College (MA); Harvard University (PhD)
- Occupation: Economist

Elizabeth Ellis Hoyt (January 27, 1893 – November 22, 1980) was an American economist who focused on consumption economics and developing countries. Her work on analyzing and compiling cost-of-living metrics led to the creation of the Consumer Price Index in the United States. She was a professor of economics at Iowa State University, where she served on the faculty for 55 years.

== Early life and education ==
Hoyt was born on born January 27, 1893, in Augusta, Maine. She was the youngest of three children; their mother died when she was 10. She attended the Latin School for Girls in Boston, the first college preparatory school for girls in the country.

In 1910, Hoyt entered Boston College to study Latin. There, she earned her AB degree in 1913. After being turned down for a job with immigration services, she worked as a stenographer for the YMCA. From 1915 to 1916, she studied classics at Wellesley College.

After working for the National Industrial Conference Board, Hoyt earned her MA from Radcliffe College in 1924, followed by her PhD from Harvard University in 1925. Her PhD thesis was published as her first book, Primitive Trade: Its Psychology and Economics (1926).

== Career ==
Hoyt worked as a researcher at the National Industrial Conference Board from 1917 to 1921. During this time, she compiled cost-of-living metrics into what is considered the forerunner of the Consumer Price Index.

From 1921 to 1923, Hoyt was an instructor at Wellesley College. After receiving her graduate degrees, she joined Iowa State College as an associate professor, becoming the only female faculty member. She became a full professor in 1927 and taught at Iowa State through her retirement in 1963.

=== Research ===
Alongside Hazel Kyrk and Margaret Reid, Hoyt was considered an early pioneer in the study of the economics of consumption. Hoyt's work focused on the use and management of resources in the future, and she studied how consumption's role is "useful for understanding the nature of economic systems, especially in other cultures". The work of Hoyt, Kyrk, and Paul Nystrom is credited with helping to found the concept of marginal utility.

=== Awards ===
- In 1950, Hoyt was awarded a Fulbright Scholarship to study the economy in East Africa
- In 1957, Hoyt received a Ford Foundation grant to study workers in Central America and the Caribbean
- In 1964, Hoyt received a Graduate Society Medal from Radcliffe College
- In 1969, Hoyt was awarded a Faculty Citation from Iowa State
- In 1970, a library in Paradise View, South Africa, was named after her in recognition of her work in Africa

== Death and legacy ==
Hoyt died November 22, 1980, in Gleneden Beach, Oregon. She is buried at Ocean Hill Cemetery in Bristol, Maine. Despite being considered a pioneer of consumption economics, she is recognized as being "neglected in published accounts" with her work being largely undocumented.

== Works ==
- Primitive Trade (1926)
- Consumption of Wealth
- Consumption in our Society (1938)
- Income in Our Society
- Choice and Destiny of Nations (1969)
