= Personal finance =

Budgeting and expenses

Personal finance is the financial management that an individual or a family unit performs to budget, save, and spend monetary resources in a controlled manner, taking into account various financial risks and future life events.

When planning personal finances, the individual would take into account the suitability of various banking products (checking accounts, savings accounts, credit cards, and loans), insurance products (health insurance, disability insurance, life insurance, etc.), and investment products (bonds, stocks, real estate, etc.), as well as participation in monitoring and management of credit scores, income taxes, retirement funds and pensions.

== History ==
Before a specialty in personal finance was developed, various closely related disciplines, such as family economics and consumer economics, were taught in various colleges as part of home economics for over 100 years.

In 1920, Hazel Kyrk's dissertation at the University of Chicago was instrumental in developing the disciplines of consumer and family economics. Margaret Reid, a professor of home economics at the same university, is recognized as one of the pioneers in the study of consumer behavior and household behavior.

In 1947, Herbert A. Simon, a Nobel laureate, suggested that a decision-maker did not always make the best financial decision because of limited educational resources and personal inclinations.

Research into personal finance is based on several theories, such as social exchange theory and andragogy (adult learning theory). In America, professional bodies such as the American Association of Family and Consumer Sciences and the American Council on Consumer Interests started to play an important role in developing this field from the 1950s to the 1970s. The Association for Financial Counseling and Planning Education (AFCPE) at Iowa State University and the Academy of Financial Services (AFS) were established in 1984 and 1985 respectively. AFCPE started to offer several certifications for professionals in this field, such as Accredited Financial Counselor (AFC) and Certified Housing Counselor (CHC). Meanwhile, AFS cooperates with Certified Financial Planner (CFP Board).

Before 1990, the study of personal finance received little attention from mainstream economists and business faculties. However, several American universities such as Brigham Young University, Iowa State University, and San Francisco State University started to offer financial educational programs in both undergraduate and graduate programs since the 1990s. These institutions published several works in journals such as The Journal of Financial Counseling and Planning and the Journal of Personal Finance.

As the concerns about consumers' financial capability increased during the early 2000s, various education programs emerged, catering to a broad audience or a specific group of people, such as youth and women. The educational programs are frequently known as "financial literacy". The Financial Literacy and Education Commission issued the first U.S. national strategy for financial education in 2006. The United States President's Advisory Council on Financial Capability was set up in 2008 to encourage financial literacy among the American people. It also stressed the importance of developing a standard in financial education.

== Personal finance principles ==
It is hard to define universal personal finance principles because:

- Individual situations vary significantly when it comes to income, wealth, and consumption requirements.
- Tax and financial regulations vary between countries.
- Market conditions change both geographically and over time.

A financial advisor can offer personalized advice in complicated situations and for high-wealth individuals. Still, University of Chicago professor Harold Pollack and personal finance writer Helaine Olen argue that in the United States, good personal finance advice boils down to a few simple points:

- Pay off credit card balances every month in full
- Dedicate 10-20% of post-tax income for savings and investments
- Create an emergency fund that can last at least 6 months
- Maximize contributions to tax-advantaged funds such as a 401(k) retirement funds, individual retirement accounts, and 529 education savings plans
- When investing savings:
  - Avoid trading individual securities
  - Look for low-cost, diversified mutual funds and exchange-traded funds (ETFs) that balance risk vs. reward appropriately to an individual's target retirement year
- If using a financial advisor, require them to commit to a fiduciary duty to act in an individual's best interest

The limits stated by laws may be different in each country; in any case personal finance should not disregard correct behavioral principles and the diligence of a "good family father": people should not develop attachment to the idea of money, morally reprehensible, and, when investing, should maintain the medium-long-term horizon avoiding hazards in the expected return of investment.

== Personal financial planning process ==
The key component of personal finance is financial planning which is a dynamic process requiring regular monitoring and re-evaluation. In general, it involves five steps:

1. Assessment: A person's financial situation is assessed by compiling simplified versions of financial statements, including balance sheets and income statements. A personal balance sheet lists the values of personal assets (e.g., car, house, clothes, stocks, bank account, cryptocurrencies), along with personal liabilities (e.g., credit card debt, bank loan, mortgage). A personal income statement lists personal income and expenses.
2. Goal setting: Multiple goals are expected, including short- and long-term goals. For example, a long-term goal would be to "retire at age 65 with a personal net worth of $1,000,000", while a short-term goal would be to "save up for a new computer in the next month." Setting financial goals helps to direct financial planning by determining the parameters and expectations one aims to achieve.
3. Plan creation: The financial plan details how to accomplish the financial goals set in the previous step. It could include, for example, reducing unnecessary expenses, increasing employment income, or investing in a fixed deposit.
4. Execution: Execution of a financial plan often requires discipline, perseverance and sacrifice. Many people take assistance from professionals such as accountants, financial planners, investment advisers, and lawyers.
5. Monitoring and reassessment: The financial plan is monitored in regular intervals to determine if one is on track to reach one's goals. This information is evaluated to make potential adjustments as time passes and circumstances change.

Typical goals that most adults and young adults have are paying off credit card/student loan/housing/car loan debt, investing for retirement, investing for college costs for children, and paying medical expenses.

== Goals for personal finance ==
In the modern world, there is a growing need for people to understand and take control of their finances for the following reasons:

1. Lack of comprehensive formal education: Although many countries provide some formal education in personal finance, studies by the Organisation for Economic Co-operation and Development (OECD) show low financial literacy in areas where it is not required, even in developed countries such as Japan.

- Personal finance education is not always required in public education, with just under 30% of high schools in the US in 2024 not requiring personal finance for graduation.
- Graduates with financial education have higher average credit scores and receive more favorable loan conditions.
- Hence, it is essential to recognize the connection between financial courses in the education system and the generational shift in personal financial education.

This illustrates the importance of learning personal finance from an early stage, differentiating between needs and wants, improving financial literacy, and building financial planning skills.

2. Shortened employable age: Over the years, with the advent of automation and changing needs, several jobs that require manual intervention or involve mechanical tasks have increasingly become redundant worldwide.

- Several employment opportunities are shifting from countries with higher labor costs to countries with lower labor costs, allowing companies to keep costs low.
- In economies with a considerably large younger population entering the workforce and better equipped with the latest technologies, employees in middle management who have not upskilled may be replaced by newer employees who cost organizations less.
- Cyclical nature of several industries: In industries such as automobiles, chemicals, and construction, consumption and demand are driven by the health of a country's economy. When economies stagnate, enter recession, or experience war, specific industries may suffer more than others. This can result in companies reducing their workforce. An individual can lose their job quickly and remain unemployed for a considerable period. These factors suggest that the effective employable age may be gradually decreasing.

These are some of the reasons individuals should start planning for retirement and systematically build their retirement corpus, hence the need for personal finance.

3. Increased life expectancy: With developments in healthcare, people today live to an older age than previous generations. Average life expectancy has increased even in developing economies. It has gradually risen from 60 to 81 years and above, which, coupled with a shorter employable age, reinforces the need for a sufficiently large retirement corpus and the importance of personal finance.

4. Rising medical expenses: Medical expenses, including the costs of prescription medicine, hospital care, nursing care, specialized care, and geriatric care, have risen over the years. Many of these expenses are not covered by private or individual insurance policies or by federal or national insurance programs.

- In developed markets such as the US, insurance coverage is provided by employers, private insurers, or the federal government through Medicare, primarily for senior citizens, or Medicaid, primarily for individuals with lower incomes. However, given the rising US fiscal deficit and the large proportion of senior citizens, the long-term sustainability of the Medicare program remains uncertain. Therapy exclusions, copayments, deductibles, and other costs may have to be borne by individuals.
- In other developed markets, such as the EU, most medical care is nationally reimbursed. This leads to national healthcare budgets being tightly controlled. Many newer and expensive therapies are excluded from national formularies. This means that patients may not have access to them through government programs and may have to pay out of pocket for these medicines.
- In developing countries such as India and China, most expenses are paid out of pocket, as there is no overarching government social security system covering medical expenses.

These reasons illustrate the need to have medical, accident, critical illness, and life insurance coverage for oneself and one's family, as well as an emergency corpus.

== Areas of focus ==
Critical areas of personal financial planning, as suggested by the Financial Planning Standards Board, are:

1. Financial position: Financial position is concerned with understanding the personal resources available by examining net worth and household cash flow. Net worth is a person's balance sheet, calculated by adding up all assets under that person's control, minus all household liabilities, at one point. Household cash flow is the total of all the expected income sources within a year minus all expected expenses within the same year. From this analysis, the financial planner can determine to what degree and when the personal goals can be accomplished.
2. Adequate protection: or insurance, is the analysis of how to protect a household from unforeseen risks. These risks can be divided into liability, property, death, disability, health, and long-term care. Some wagers may be self-insurable, while most require an insurance contract. Determining how much insurance to get, at the most cost-effective terms, requires knowledge of the market for personal insurance. Business owners, professionals, athletes, and entertainers need specialized insurance professionals to protect themselves adequately. Since insurance also enjoys some tax benefits, utilizing insurance investment products may be critical to the overall investment planning.
3. Tax planning: typically, the income tax is the single largest expense in a household. Managing taxes is not a question of whether or not taxes will be paid but when and how much. The government gives many incentives in the form of tax deductions and credits, which can be used to reduce the lifetime tax burden. Most modern governments use a progressive tax. As one's income grows, a higher marginal rate of tax must be paid. Understanding how to take advantage of the myriad tax breaks when planning one's finances can be significantly impactful.
4. Investment and accumulation goals: planning how to accumulate enough money for large purchases and life events is what most people consider financial planning. Significant reasons to get assets include purchasing a house or car, starting a business, paying for education expenses, and saving for retirement.
  Achieving these goals requires projecting their costs and when to withdraw funds. A significant risk to the household in achieving their accumulation goal is the rate of price increases over time, or inflation. Using net present value calculators, the financial planner will suggest a combination of asset earmarking and regular savings to be invested in various investments. To overcome the rate of inflation, the investment portfolio has to get a higher rate of return, which typically will subject the portfolio to several risks. Managing these portfolio risks is often accomplished using asset allocation, which seeks to diversify investment risk and opportunity. This asset allocation will prescribe a percentage allocation for stocks, bonds, cash, and alternative investments. The budget should also consider every investor's risk profile since risk attitudes vary from person to person.
  Depreciating Assets- One thing to consider with personal finance and net worth goals is depreciating assets. A depreciating asset is an asset that loses value over time or with use. A few examples would be the vehicle a person owns, boats, and capitalized assets. They add value to a person's life, but unlike other assets, they do not make money and should be a class of their own. In the business world, these are depreciated over time for tax and bookkeeping purposes because their useful life runs out. This is known as accumulated depreciation, and the asset will eventually need to be replaced.
5. Retirement planning is understanding how much it costs to live at retirement and developing a plan to distribute assets to meet any income shortfall. Methods for retirement plans include taking advantage of government-allowed structures to manage tax liability, including individual (IRA) structures or employer-sponsored retirement plans.
6. Estate planning involves planning to disposition one's assets after death. Typically, a tax is due to the state or federal government when one dies. Avoiding these taxes means more of one's assets will be distributed to their heirs. One can leave their assets to family, friends, or charitable groups.
7. Delayed gratification: Delayed gratification, or deferred gratification, is the ability to resist the temptation for an immediate reward and wait for a later reward. This is thought to be an important consideration in the creation of personal wealth.
8. Cash Management: It is the soul of financial planning, whether a person is an employee or planning for retirement. It is a must for every financial planner to know how much they spend before their retirement so that they can save a significant amount. This analysis is a wake-up call as many of us know our income, but very few track their expenses.
9. Revisiting Written Financial Plan Regularly: Make monitoring a financial plan regularly a habit. An annual financial planning review with a professional keeps people well-positioned and informed about the required changes, if any, in personal needs or life circumstances. It would be best to be prepared for all the sudden curve balls life throws.
10. Education Planning: With the growing interest in students' loans, having a proper financial plan in place is crucial. Parents often want to save for their kids but make the wrong decisions, adversely affecting the savings. We often observe that many parents give their kids expensive gifts or unintentionally endanger the opportunity to obtain the much-needed grant. Instead, one should make their kids prepare for the future and support them financially in their education.
11. Real Estate Planning: Shelter is a basic human need, and as such, it is imperative that one understands how to obtain a place to live and at the same time maintain their financial security. Housing can be very complicated, with decisions regarding buying or renting, mortgages, insurance, taxes, utilities, maintenance, etc. Apartment or house? That question is crucial for any individual as each option has pros and cons.
  Buy or Rent: If a person chooses to buy a house, they can make a financial investment in a home and improve their credit score and history. Home ownership can make life more stable. The price of the house, including the down payment, monthly mortgage payment, repair and maintenance costs, HOA fees, utilities, insurance, property taxes, and other costs, are considerations. If one choose to rent a home, there is no need to worry about maintenance and real estate taxes. Moving to a different location can also be easier. Expenses for renters may include electricity, water, internet, parking, and pet fees.
  Mortgages: When purchasing a home/real estate, it is essential to understand the options. Most people either go with a 15- or 30-year plan. The payment rate can be a fixed plan, a constant payment of the same amount over a certain period. The other is an ARM mortgage (Adjustable-Rate Mortgage). This rate can be adjusted and agreed upon to be changed in the given plan depending on mortgage rate fluctuations. Mortgage plans depend on a person's situation, and it is essential for potential borrowers to assess their credit score and financial status when contemplating plans.
  Location / Wants and Needs: When choosing a new home, it is essential to consider the location, along with the qualities that are desired and needed in a home. These variables can increase or decrease the price of an estate. Location-related considerations include a city or rural location, length of commute, the importance of quality public schools, level of safety, the amount of land, included amenities, proximity to family. Examples of variables that would affect the value of an estate include but are not limited to, the quality of school systems in that area, proximity to the community, shopping and entertainment/recreation, safety levels and crime rates of the neighborhood, amenities, and land size and surrounding developments. It is essential to keep all of this in mind when thinking about the future value of a home.
12. Credit: A line of credit is the ability of a customer to receive goods or services prior to payment with the promise that the debt will be repaid in the future, often with interest and or fees. Credit can be acquired through a variety of means, including unsecured debts such as personal loans, student loans, and credit cards, as well as secured debts such as car loans and mortgages. Using debt as a means to purchase goods and services brings about a variety of pros and cons that the consumer must become educated on before diving in. Some examples of the benefits of using credit are as follows:
  - Building credit: A credit score is a measurement of a borrowers trustworthiness to a lender, ranging from 300-850. Improvements to one’s credit score are determined by a variety of factors, including making payments on time, keeping low outstanding balances, having credit lines open for long periods of time, applications for credit accounts, and variety of accounts open. These factors help lenders to determine the amount of money and the interest rate they are willing to grant to each individual applicant.
  - Buy now, pay later: Although saving up and using cash is often the most preferable option, many people resort to credit to make purchases before they have the funds to do so. For example, getting loans for major purchases such as houses and cars allows the borrower to use these goods while they pay them off over time.
  - Emergencies: Although an emergency fund is widely considered the best way to cover emergency expenses, credit allows those without emergency funds to temporarily offset the financial burden of an emergency.
  - Perks and Bonuses: Many lenders incentivize borrowers to use their lines of credit, such as credit cards, by offering perks such as travel kickbacks, sign-on bonuses, and purchase protections. When used properly by paying balances in full each month, these rewards allow the borrower to take advantage of perks they would not otherwise have access to through the use of debit cards.

Although credit can provide a variety of benefits and opportunities to the borrower, it is important to fully understand the advantages and disadvantages of borrowing to ensure sound financial decisions. Using credit indiscriminately and lack of sufficient education can land an individual into debt and disadvantaged situations. Typical downsides of using credit are:

- Overuse: Due to the nature of credit, borrowers are able to spend money even when they do not have the ability to pay off. This puts the borrower in a position of financial distress where they become dependent on debt.
- Interest and Fees: Interest and fees are levied by the lender on the borrower to profit from the process of lending. By holding balances for long periods of time a borrower will accrue interest resulting in having to pay back more money than originally borrowed.
- Monthly Payments: Many lenders often require minimum payments at regular intervals to see return on their lending. If a borrower builds up high amounts of debt, these minimum payments can grow larger and become overwhelming.

== Education and tools ==
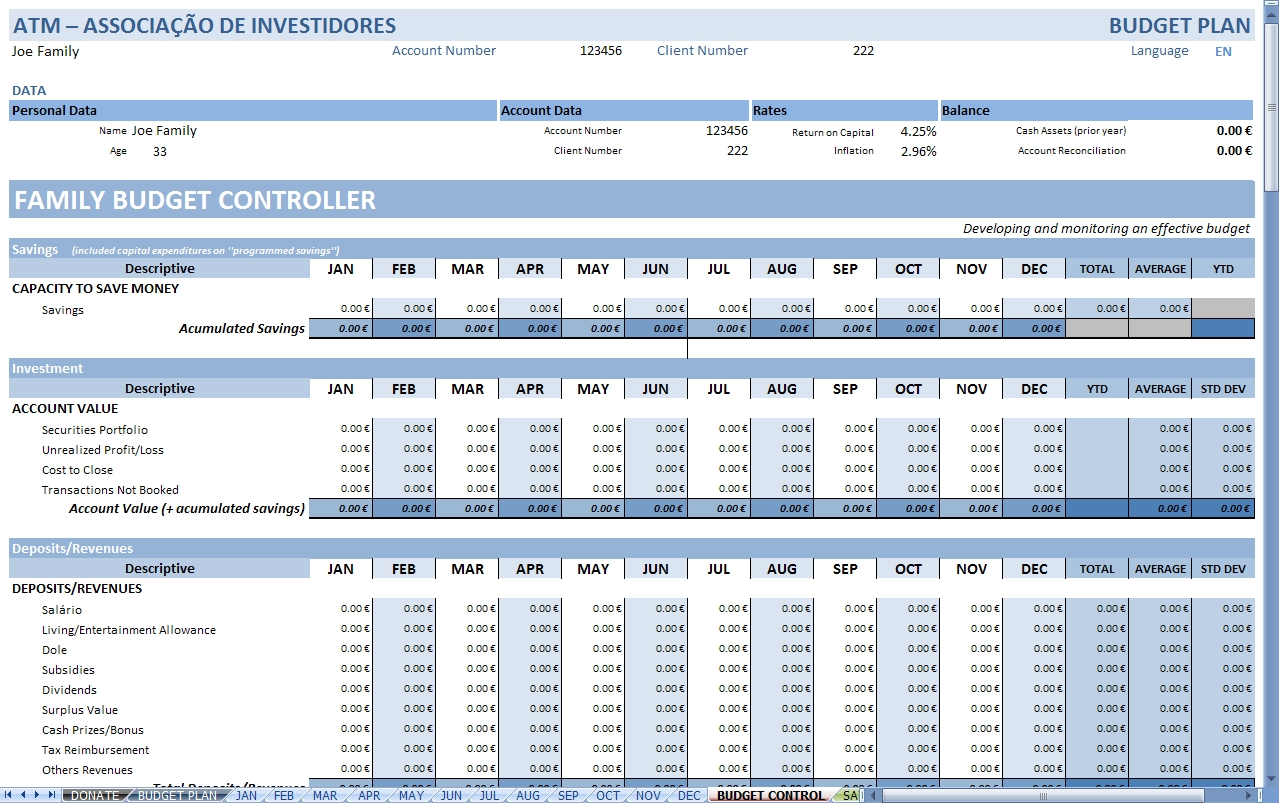
An example of personal budget planning software

According to a survey done by Harris Interactive, 99% of the adults agreed that personal finance should be taught in schools. Financial authorities and the American federal government had offered free educational materials online to the public. However, a Bank of America poll found that 42% of adults were discouraged. In comparison, 28% of adults thought that personal finance is difficult because of the vast amount of online information. As of 2015, 17 out of 50 states in the United States require high school students to study personal finance before graduation. The effectiveness of financial education on general audience is controversial. For example, a study by Bell, Gorin, and Hogarth (2009) stated that financial education graduates were more likely to use a formal spending plan. Financially educated high school students are more likely to have a savings account with regular savings, fewer overdrafts, and more likely to pay off their credit card balances. However, another study done by Cole and Shastry (Harvard Business School, 2009) found that there were no differences in saving behaviors of people in American states with financial literacy mandate enforced and the states without a literacy mandate.

Kiplinger publishes magazines on personal finance.

== See also ==
- Accounting software
- Asset allocation
- Asset location
- Corporate finance
- Debt consolidation
- Equity investment
- Estate planning
- Family planning
- List of personal finance software
- Microeconomics
- Money management
- Personal budget
- Separately managed account
- Wealth management
