= Hazel Kyrk =

American economist (1886–1957)

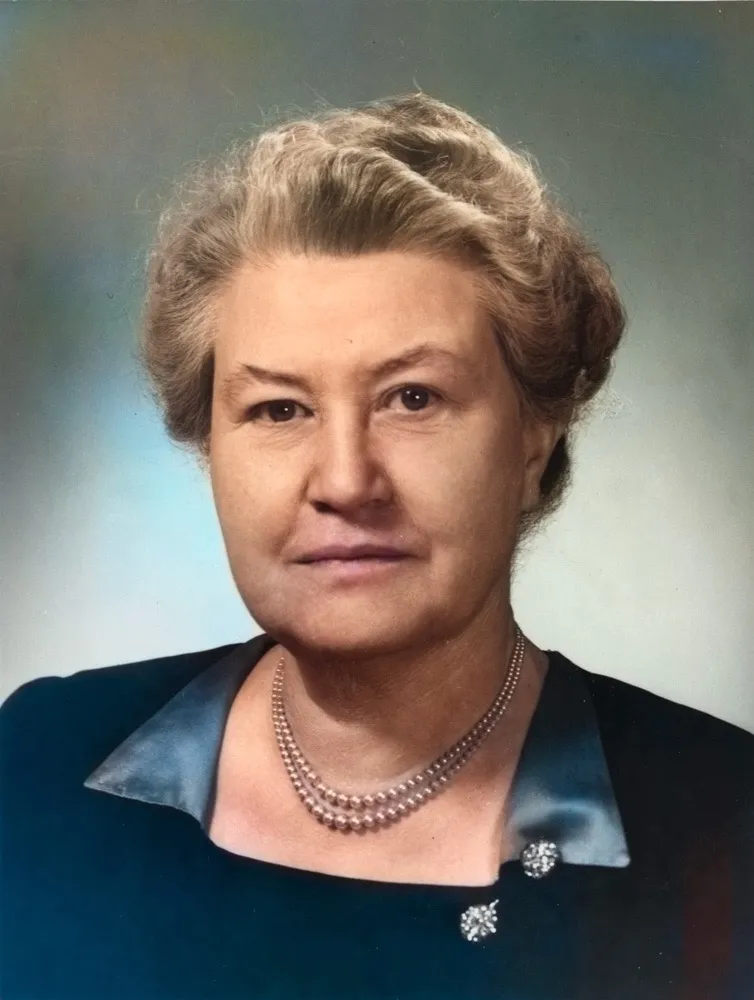
- Colorized photograph of Kyrk
- Born: 1886; Ashley, Ohio
- Died: 1957 (aged 70–71); West Dover, Vermont

Academic background
- Education: University of Chicago
- Influences: James A. Field

Hazel Kyrk (1886–1957) was an American economist and pioneer of consumer economics.

== Early life and education ==
Hazel Kyrk was born in 1886 in Ashley, Ohio and was the only child of Elmer Kyrk, a drayman, and Jane Kyrk, a homemaker.

Before entering Wesleyan University, Kyrk worked as a teacher in schools for three years. She attended Ohio Wesleyan University from 1904 to 1906. To supplement her father's meager income she worked as a housekeeper to the economics professor Leon Carroll Marshall while attending the university. The University of Chicago had become a hotbed for social science and Marshall moved there in 1906. Kyrk moved as well to continue her studies at university. In 1910 she earned a Ph.B. in economics. After working as an instructor at Wellesley College in Massachusetts she returned to Chicago to work towards a Ph.D. in economics. In 1914 she held a teaching position at Oberlin College in Ohio while continuing her doctoral studies. When the United States entered World War I in 1918 Kyrk moved to London to work as a statistician at the American Division of the Allied Maritime Transport Council. She resumed the work on her doctoral dissertation and employment with Oberlin College after the war had ended.

With a dissertation supervised by James A. Field, Kyrk earned her economics Ph.D. in 1920. Kyrk's dissertation was published 1923 under the title A Theory of Consumption. Kyrk fused the emerging field of social psychology with economics and analyzed the impact of regulated consumption in wartime England. A Theory of Consumption has become of classic interpretation of the social basis of consumer behavior.

== Career ==
In 1923 Kyrk found employment as an economist at the Food Research Institute at Stanford University where she co-authored The American Baking Industry, 1849-1923. In 1933 she became professor at Iowa State University. In 1925 she moved to the University of Chicago and remained there until her retirement in 1952. At the University of Chicago she first held a joint appointment as associate professor in the home economics and the economics departments. She was promoted to full professor in 1941. She broadened the economics curriculum to include consumer, consumption and consumer choice topics. Under her influence the University of Chicago became noted as the premier university for the study of consumer economics. Among others, she supervised the doctoral dissertation of Margaret G. Reid.

Kyrk's academic interest in working women was informed by a teaching position she held at the Bryn Mawr College Summer School for Working Women between 1922 and 1925. Kyrk also served on the board of the Chicago Women's Trade Union League.

In the 1920s Kyrk became a contributor to the Journal of Home Economics and the American Economic Review. In the latter she published an article on income distribution. In 1940 she co-authored the home economics book Food Buying and Our Markets. In 1933 she published Economic Problems of the Family. A revised version of the book was published in 1953 under the title The Family in the American Economy.

Kyrk served as principal economist in the United States Department of Agriculture's Bureau of Home Economics between 1938 and 1941. Kyrk contributed to the Consumer Purchase Study, the bureau's comprehensive consumer survey. The study became accepted as economic barometer and a reference point for workforce management. It established consumer patterns in five different regions, each subdivided into urban, village, and farm divisions. The study determined the cost-of-living index and established a consumer price index, which has become one of the most widely accepted measures of inflation.

In 1943 Kyrk was appointed as chair of the Consumer Advisory Committee to the Office of Price Administration. She argued for better standards in consumer goods and urged a slower rate of price decontrol during World War II. Between 1945 and 1946 Kyrk chaired the technical advisory committee for the Bureau of Labor Statistics and formulated a "standard family budget" as economic indicator to measure the economic health of US families. The standard family budget also served as the basis for income-tax exemption and informed subsequent definitions of poverty and the poverty line. As chair of the technical advisory Kyrk also worked on the revisions of the consumer price index to reflect post-war inflation.

In 1952 Kyrk retired from the University of Chicago and moved to Washington D.C. She finished writing and published the textbook The Family in the American Economy. In 1953 Ohio Wesleyan University honoured her with the degree of doctor of humane letters. Hazel Kyrk died in 1957 West Dover, Vermont.

== Economic theories ==
=== Consumption ===
In A Theory of Consumption Kyrk argued that patterns of consumption behavior are determined largely by norms of the "appropriate and necessary" or by a socially defined "standard of living". To explain consumption, she argued, it was necessary to take into account these norms and determine their influence on valuation and choice. Kyrk maintained that changes in these norms impact on consumption. Kyrk concluded that marginal utility theory could not adequately explain consumption and developed an instrumental rational choice theory. In the 1920s and 1930s this theoretical approach to explaining consumption by establishing the accepted standard of living was widely adopted. Kyrk's central theoretical argument was further developed by Theresa McMahon and Jessica Blanche Peixotto.

=== Household production ===
In Economic Problems of the Family, Kyrk considered the work of homemakers. She estimated that in 1930 there were approximately 49 million people in the United States with a "gainful occupation" and about 25.5 million homemakers. Kyrk tried to define household production, arguing that the conspicuous consumption Thorstein Veblen had identified in upper-class households was not productive. Kyrk critiqued household production, arguing that it could not be efficient in a business sense, given the fixed overhead costs and the dispersion of tasks in a typical homemaker's day. She concluded that "household management like business management may strive to lower costs, but the aim of the one is thereby to maximize income and of the other to maximize the results of expenditure". Kyrk argued that specialized machinery and labor that could be utilized to full capacity under centralized management would lead to gradual shift away from household production. She maintained that household production was the result of societal norms and not clearly distinguishable from consumption. The production of food or entertainment in a household took place so "that we may live as we desire".

== Works ==
- A Theory of Consumption (1923)
- The Economic Problems of the Family (1929)
- The Consumer and the Marketing System (1934)
- Family Housing and Facilities (1940)
- Family Expenditures for Housing and Household Operation (1941)
- The Family in the American Economy (1953)
