= Chester W. Wright =

American economic historian

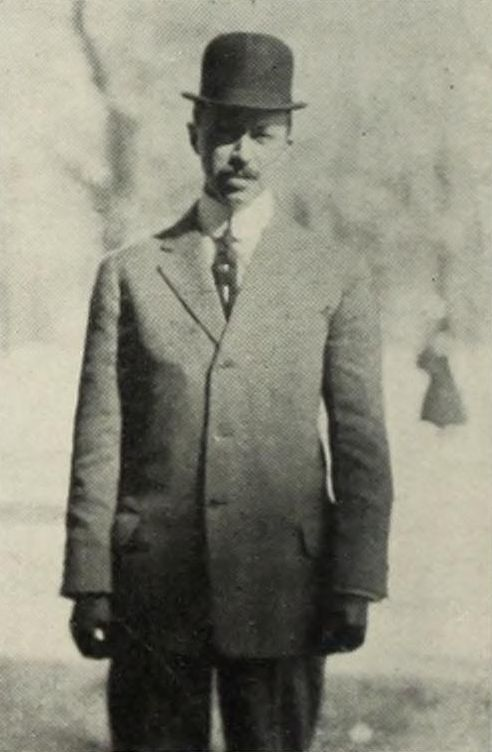
- Chester W. Wright, 1911
- Born: 1879
- Died: 1966 (aged 86–87)

Academic background
- Education: Harvard University
- Doctoral advisor: Frank Taussig

Academic work
- Institutions: University of Chicago
- Doctoral students: Harold Innis

Chester Whitney Wright (1879–1966) was an American economic historian, and Professor at the University of Chicago, known for his works on the economic history of the United States.

== Biography ==
Wright studied at the Harvard University, where he obtained his AB in 1901, his AM in 1902, and his PhD in 1906 with the thesis, entitled "Wool-growing and tariff: A Study in the Economic History of the United States" under Frank William Taussig.

After graduation in 1906 Wright started his academic career at Cornell University. The next year in 1907 he moved to the University of Chicago to become assistant professor of Political Economy. He became associate professor and later full professor, and he kept teaching until his retirement in 1944. In 1908 Wright was awarded the David Ames Wells Prize for 1907–1908 for his thesis "Wool-Growing and the Tariff."

== Work ==
=== Economic History of the United States" Wright, 1941 ===
In his "Economic History of the United States" Wright (1941) explained to offer a "functional approach to economic history." He explained:

The approach to the study of economic history that dominates the presentation of the subject in this volume is that of the economist whose immediate and primary function is to study the production and distribution of wealth with the objective of learning how the nation's economic progress can be promoted and its standard of living advanced. It can be called the functional approach to economic history. Although the narrative should provide such knowledge of the general background of economic history as is needed for most purposes in the interpretation of political history, and has frequently been turned aside to indicate the reactions thus involved, this has been a secondary rather than a primary consideration in the selection and organization of the material. Some material has been included because it served certain of the other objectives mentioned in the introductory chapter, though for the most part these objectives are served also by the material primarily of significance in relation to the major objective.

Wright regarded as the fundamental problem" of his study, the question of "How the national income has been increased and distributed."

Williamson (1941) commented, that "Within the limits of some 1120 pages Professor Wright has included an account of the major factors contributing to our economic development as well as a description of many of the minor influences. While the main emphasis is upon the evolution of economic institutions, attention is given to noneconomic factors which have affected economic life, and to the influence, in turn, of economic forces upon general historical development."

== Selected publications ==
- Wright, Chester Whitney. Wool-growing and the Tariff: A Study in the Economic History of the United States. Harvard university, 1907; 1910.
- Field, James Alfred; Marshall, Leon Carroll; Wright, Chester Whitney Materials For the Study of Elementary Economics, University of Chicago Press, 1913.
- Wright, Chester Whitney. Economic History of the United States, McGraw Hill, New York 1941; 1949.
- Wright, Chester Whitney. Economic Problems of War and Its Aftermath, 1942.

Articles, a selection:

- Wright, Chester W. "The More Enduring Economic Consequences of America's Wars." The Journal of Economic History 3.S1 (1943): 9-26.
- Wright, Chester W. "The nature and objectives of economic history." The Journal of Political Economy (1938): 688–701.
