= Howard S. Ellis =

American economist

- Born: July 2, 1898; Denver, Colorado, US
- Died: April 15, 1992 (aged 93); Capitola, California, US

Academic background
- Education: Harvard University; University of Michigan; University of Iowa
- Doctoral advisor: Frank William Taussig

Howard Sylvester Ellis (July 2, 1898 – April 15, 1992) was an American economist. He was a professor of economics at the University of California, Berkeley from 1938 to 1965. In 1949, he served as president of the American Economic Association.

He is remembered for his essay 'Bilateralism and the Future of International Trade' (Summer 1945) which influenced United States trade policy after World War II.

From 1943 to 1946 he was deputy director of Research and Statistics of the Board of Governors of the Federal Reserve System. In 1944-1945 and 1949 he was visiting professor of economics at Columbia University, and in 1951 at the University of Tokyo, 1958–1959 at the University of Mumbai. From 1949 to 1950 director of the Council on Foreign Relations project to study the Marshall Plan, from 1952 to 1953 economic adviser to the U.S. State Department. In 1960, UN specialist on Latin American education issues. In 1963, Professor at the Center for Economic Research in Athens.
