= Norman E. Himes =

American economist

Norman Edwin Himes (1899–1949) was an American sociologist and economist and Professor at Colgate University, known for his work on the medical history of contraception.

Himes obtained his PhD from Harvard University in 1932. After graduation, he started his academic career at Colgate University in 1932. In World War II he served at the Surgeon General of the United States. His research interests were in the field of "population problems, history of contraception and the birth control movement, and marriage and family relations."

== Selected publications ==
- The Truth about Birth Control: With a Bibliography of Birth Control Literature, John Day (1932)
- Himes, Norman Edwin, and Christopher Tietze. Medical history of contraception. Vol. 657. New York: Gamut Press, 1936, 1963.
- Himes, Norman Edwin, and Donald Lavor Taylor. Your marriage. Rinehart, 1955.

Selected articles

- Himes, Norman E. "The place of John Stuart Mill and of Robert Owen in the history of English neo-Malthusianism." The Quarterly Journal of Economics (1928): 627–640.
- Himes, Norman E. "Essays on population and other papers by James Alfred Field, together with material from his notes and lectures compiled and edited by Helen Fisher Hohman, with a foreword by James Bonar, LL. D." The Eugenics Review 23.3 (1931): 258-261: On the work of James A. Field.
- Himes, Norman E. "Birth control in historical and clinical perspective." The Annals of the American Academy of Political and Social Science (1932): 49–65.
