= Leverett S. Lyon =

American economist

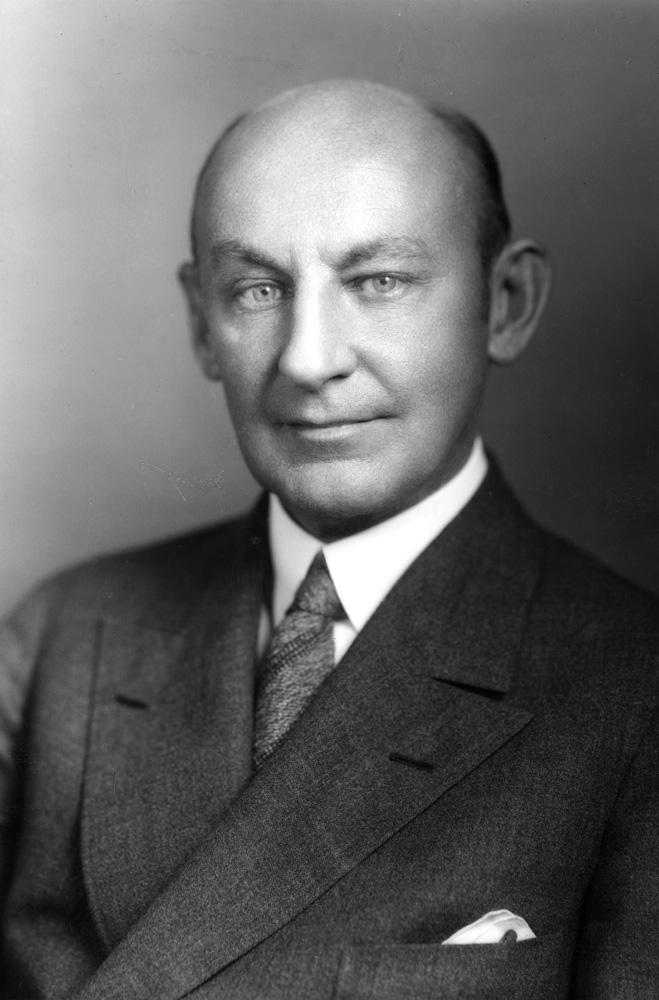
Leverett Samuel Lyon.

Leverett Samuel Lyon (December 11, 1885 – 1959) was an American economist, lawyer and business executive, known for his works on education, government, marketing, and economic life, and particularly on the National Recovery Administration.

== Life and work ==
Born in Sollitt, Illinois to Edward Payson Lyon and Charlotte Rose, Lyon obtained his Bachelor of Arts degree at Beloit College, where he joined the Phi Kappa Psi fraternity, and then his law degree at the Chicago-Kent College of Law in 1915. At University of Chicago he obtained his MA in 1919 and his PhD in 1921 with his thesis, titled "A functional approach to social-economic data."

From 1916 to 1929 Lyon taught economics at University of Chicago, at Washington University in St. Louis, where he was also Dean of the School of Commerce and Finance from 1923 to 1925, and at the Robert Brookings Graduate School of Economics and Government. In 1929 he left academia and joined the American centrist think tank the Brookings Institution, where he was executive vice-president from 1932 to 1939.

In 1939 he moved to the Chicago Association of Commerce and Industry, where he served as its chief executive officer from until his retirement in 1954.

== Work ==
Lyon is noted for his early work "Our Economic Organization," (1921) co-authored with Leon C. Marshall, which is considered "an excellent brief analysis of the American economic structure", for his 1922 "Education for Business," and for his pioneering work in the field of marketing. According to Engle (1919):

It was during his years at Brookings that his greatest contributions to marketing emerged from his tireless research. Between 1925 and the inception of the New Deal such fundamental contributions to marketing literature as the following flowed from his pen.

His most notable publications in the field of marketing were Salesmen in Marketing Strategy (1926), the Hand-to- Mouth Buying (1929), Some Trends in the Marketing of Canned Foods (1930), Advertising Allowances (1932), and The Economics of Free Deals (1933).

== Selected publications ==
- Lyon, Leverett Samuel. Elements of Debating: A Manual for Use in High Schools and Academies. University of Chicago Press, 1913.
- Lyon, Leverett Samuel. A Survey of Commercial Education in the Public High Schools of the United States. Vol. 2. University of Chicago, 1919.
- Leon C. Marshall and Leverett S. Lyon. Our economic organization. New York : Te Macmillan Company, 1921.
- Lyon, Leverett Samuel. Education for business. University of Chicago Press, 1922.
- Lyon, Leverett S. Salesmen in marketing strategy. (1926).
- Lyon, Leverett S. Economics of open price systems. (1936).
- Lyon, Leverett Samuel, et al. The National Recovery administration: an analysis and appraisal. Da Capo Press, 1936; 1972.
- Lyon, Leverett S., Myron Webster Watkins, and Victor Abramson. Government and economic life: development and current issues of American public policy, (1939).

Articles, a selection

- Lyon, Leverett S. "A functional approach to social-economic data." The Journal of Political Economy (1920): 529–564.: Originally PhD thesis, University of Chicago, 1920.
