= F. W. Taussig =

American economist and academic (1859–1940)

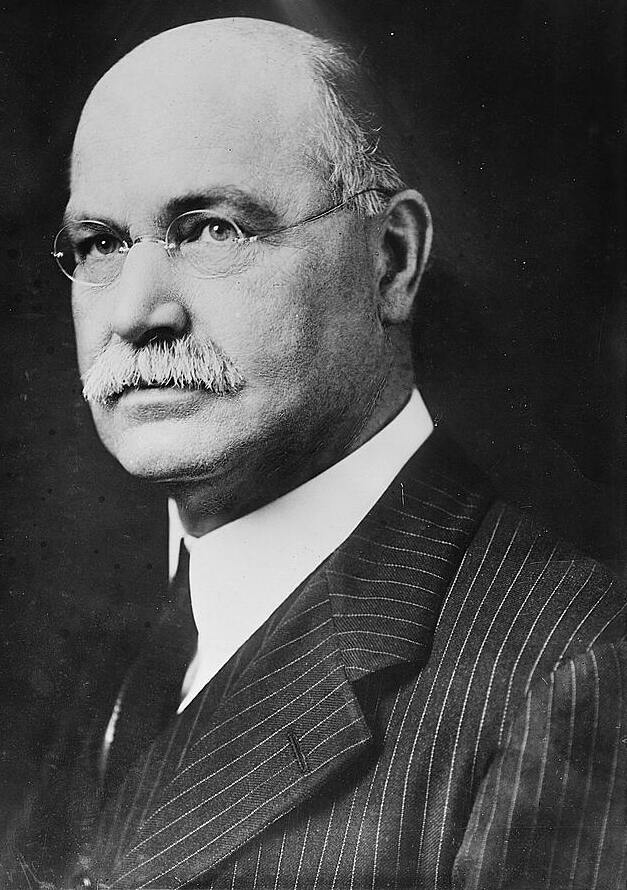
- Taussig, c. 1915
- Born: Frank William Taussig; December 28, 1859; St. Louis, Missouri, US
- Died: November 11, 1940 (aged 80); Cambridge, Massachusetts, US
- Spouses: Edith Thomas Guild (m. 1888; died 1910); Laura Fisher (m. 1918)

Academic background
- Education: Washington University in St. Louis Harvard University
- Influences: Charles F. Dunbar

Academic work
- Discipline: Economics
- Sub-discipline: International economics
- Institutions: Harvard University
- Doctoral students: Clifford Clark; Howard S. Ellis; W. A. Mackintosh; Jacob Viner; John H. Williams; Chester W. Wright; Harry Dexter White

Frank William Taussig (December 28, 1859 – November 11, 1940) was an American economist who is credited with creating the foundations of modern trade theory. He was a professor of economics at Harvard University. He was also a founder of Omicron Delta Epsilon.

He was the editor of the Quarterly Journal of Economics from 1889 to 1890 and from 1896 to 1935, president of the American Economic Association in 1904 and 1905.

== Early life ==
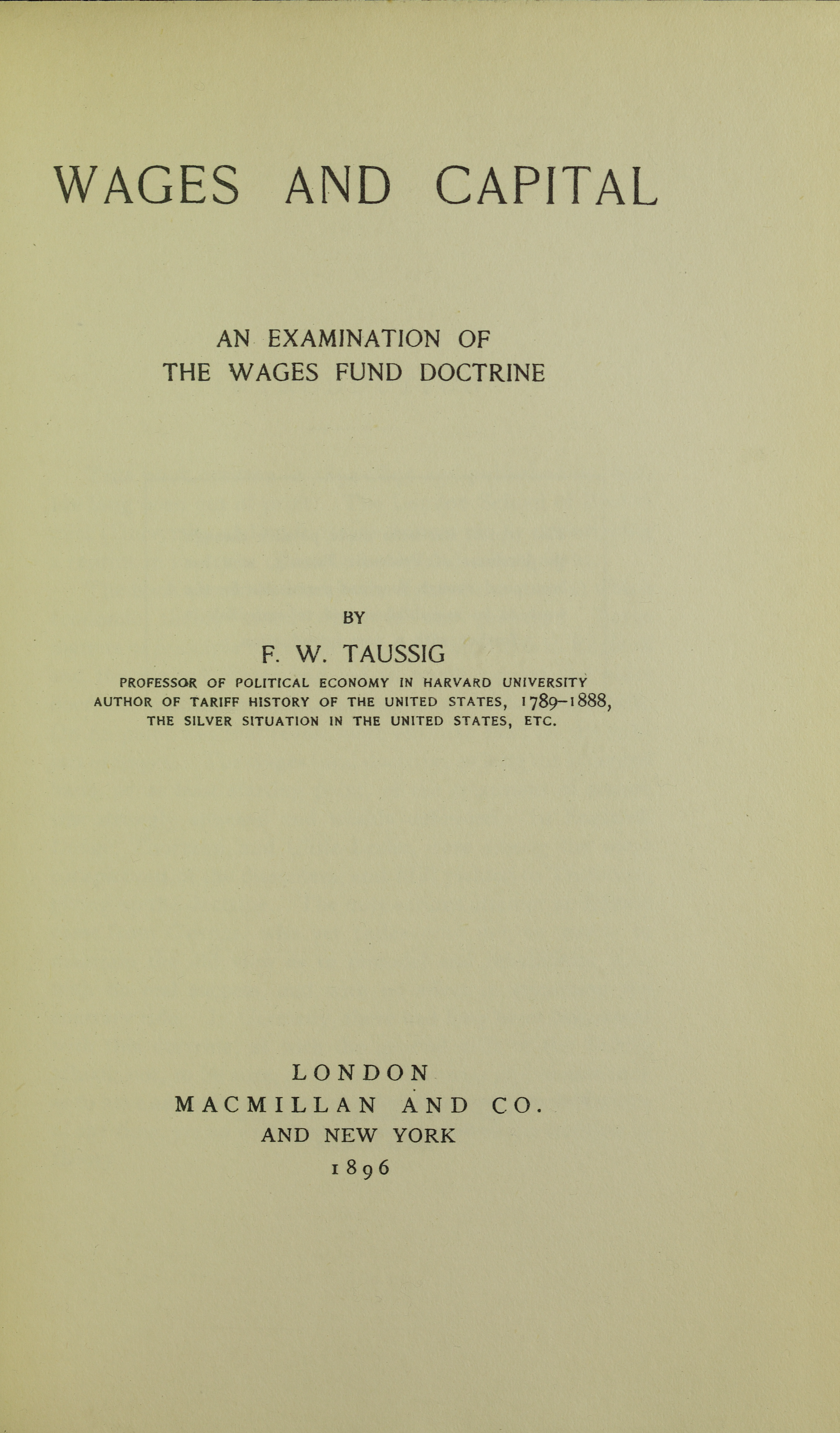
Wages and Capital, 1935

He was born on December 28, 1859, in St. Louis, Missouri, the son of William Taussig and Adele Wuerpel. His parents encouraged his literary and musical interests, and he played the violin at an early age. He was educated in the St. Louis public schools and at Smith Academy in that same city. He then went to Washington University in St. Louis but, after a year transferred to Harvard from where he graduated in 1879.

He traveled in Europe for a year, taking some time to study economics at the University of Berlin. He then did graduate work at Harvard in law and economics while he was secretary to President Charles W. Eliot for some years. Taussig received a law degree in 1886.

== Career ==
In 1886, Taussig was appointed assistant professor at Harvard. He became professor of economics in 1892 and later became the chair of the economics department. He remained at Harvard for the balance of his professional career except for several years spent in federal service.

At Harvard, he sponsored the Undergraduate Society of Economics. Under his leadership, the society merged with the Economics Society of the University of Wisconsin to form The Order of Artus (Omicron Delta Gamma), a men's honorary fraternity for economics, on May 7, 1915.

He was the editor of the Quarterly Journal of Economics from 1889 to 1890 and from 1896 to 1935, president of the American Economic Association in 1904 and 1905.

He was the chair of the United States Tariff Commission from 1917 to 1919. In March 1919, he was called to Paris to advise in the adjustment of commercial treaties, and in November, on invitation of Woodrow Wilson, he attended the second industrial conference in Washington, DC, for promoting peace between capital and labor. He was a strong supporter of the League of Nations.

Taussig was elected a member of both the American Academy of Arts and Sciences and the American Philosophical Society. The successor to his chair at Harvard was Joseph Schumpeter.

== Beliefs ==
Taussig was an open advocate of forced sterilization of races and classes he considered inferior. In his 1911 textbook Principles of Economics, Taussing remarked:

Certain types of criminals and paupers breed only their kind, and society has a right and a duty to protect its members from the repeated burden of maintaining and guarding such parasites. ... The human race could be immensely improved in quality, and its capacity for happy living immensely increased, if those of poor physical and mental endowment were prevented from multiplying.

Paul Douglas (a future president of the American Economic Association and three-term Senator from Illinois) was a graduate student under Taussig at Harvard in the Fall of 1915 and recalled the experience. Douglas had studied two years in graduate school at Columbia University with Edwin Seligman, who was an ideological enemy of Taussig. Given the opportunity to criticize the Columbia school of economic thought by confronting Douglas, Taussig attempted to humiliate him to the delight of the Harvard pupils who filled the lecture hall to witness the "slaughter". Eventually, Douglas turned the tables and trapped Taussig in a logical economic debate. Douglas recalled, "The following day, Taussig cordially shook hands with me at the end of the hour. ... We also became fast friends for the rest of his life. Trying as the experience was, it was the best thing to happen to me in my academic life. It forced me to master the reasoning of the great economic theorists and to stand my ground under verbal and logical bombardment."

=== Tariffs ===
Taussig wrote that the congressional debates on the Payne–Aldrich Tariff Act were "depressing for the economist. There is hardly a gleam of general reasoning of the sort which is applied in our books to questions of international trade... That there should be general acceptance of the protectionist principle, and that the only question in debate should be whether duties were "unreasonably" high, was natural enough. Most people get used to existing conditions, and cannot easily conceive of anything different."

In a 1912 article in The Quarterly Journal of Economics, Taussig favored protecting the beet sugar industry with a tariff on sugar imports. A beet sugar industry gives intangible benefits by adding to the versatility and capabilities of American agriculture. Unskilled labor gains employment in the labor-intensive beet sugar sector of agriculture. Beet sugar grows best in cool climates of the irrigated regions of Colorado, Utah, Idaho, Montana, and California.

He advocated for the establishment of the US Tariff Commission as a council of experts to guide the U.S. president on tariff policy.

== Personal life ==
In 1888, he married Edith Thomas Guild. One of their four children was Helen B. Taussig (1898–1986), a noted pediatrician and cardiologist. F. W. Taussig's first wife died in 1910, and he married Laura Fisher.

He spent some time traveling in Europe, recovering from a nervous disorder.

He died on November 11, 1940, aged 80, in Cambridge, Massachusetts. Taussig is buried in Mount Auburn Cemetery in Cambridge.

== Works ==
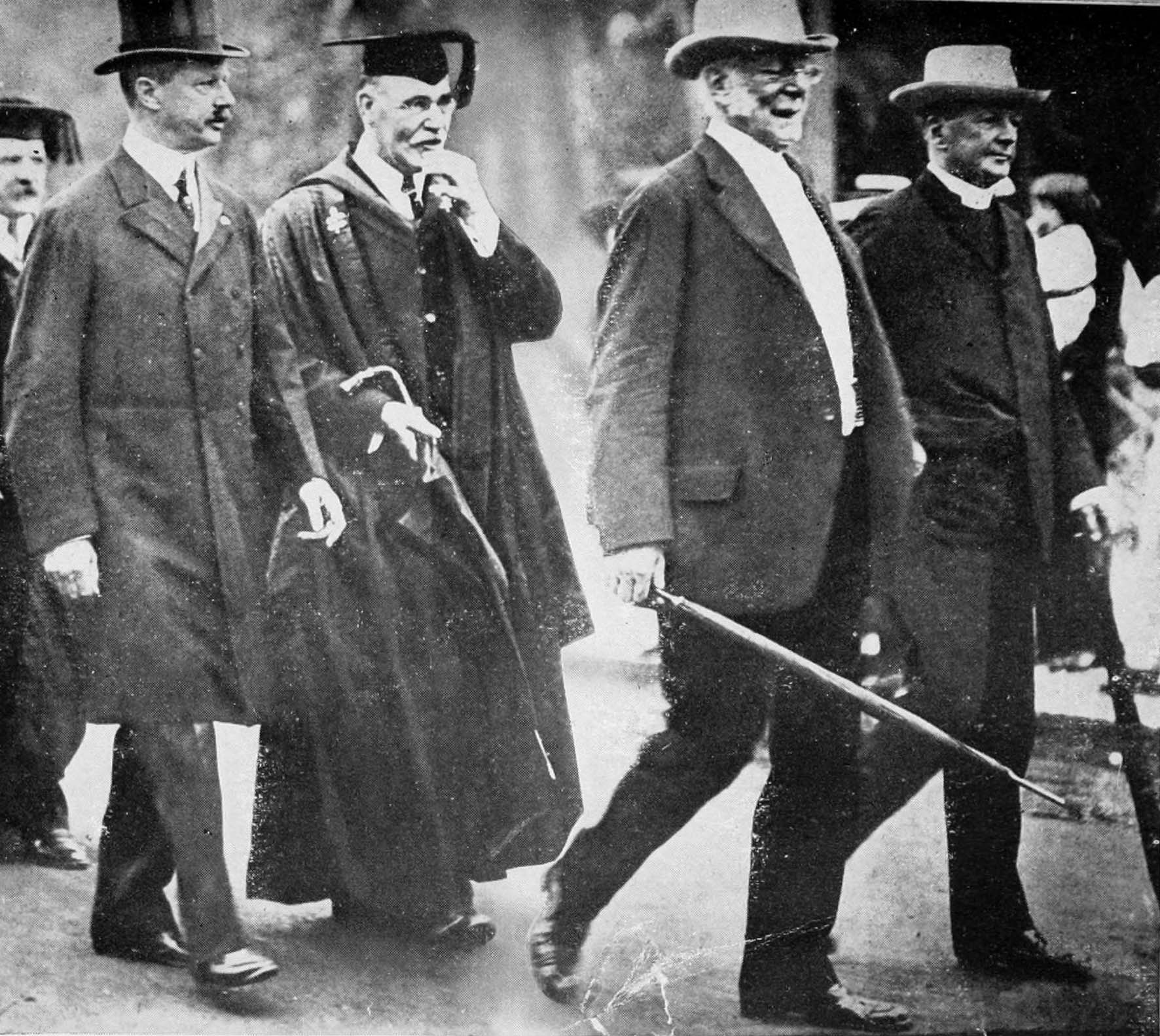
Taussig (second from the left) at the 1911 Harvard commencement

Much of Taussig's work is available from Internet Archive:

- 1883: Protection to Young Industries as Applied to the United States (second edition, 1886)
- 1885: History of the Present Tariff, 1860–83
- 1888: The Tariff History of the United States eighth edition, 1931,
- 1892: The Silver Situation in the United States (second edition, revised, 1896)
- 1896: Wages and Capital
- 1911, 1915, 1927 Principles of Economics, volume 1, Volume 2
- 1915: Some Aspects of the Tariff Question
- 1915: Inventors and Money Makers, Brown University lectures
- 1920: Free Trade, the Tariff, and Reciprocity
- 1927: International Trade
- 1887–1935: Economic theory exam questions

== Sources ==
- Britannica Online
- Profile of Frank W. Taussig at the History of Economic Thought website.
- Department of Economics, University of Victoria
- Chisholm, Hugh, ed. (1922). "Taussig, Frank William" . Encyclopædia Britannica (12th ed.). London & New York: The Encyclopædia Britannica Company.
- Gilman, D. C.; Peck, H. T.; Colby, F. M., eds. (1905). "Taussig, Frank William" . New International Encyclopedia (1st ed.). New York: Dodd, Mead.
