= Charles Hubbard Judd =

American educational psychologist

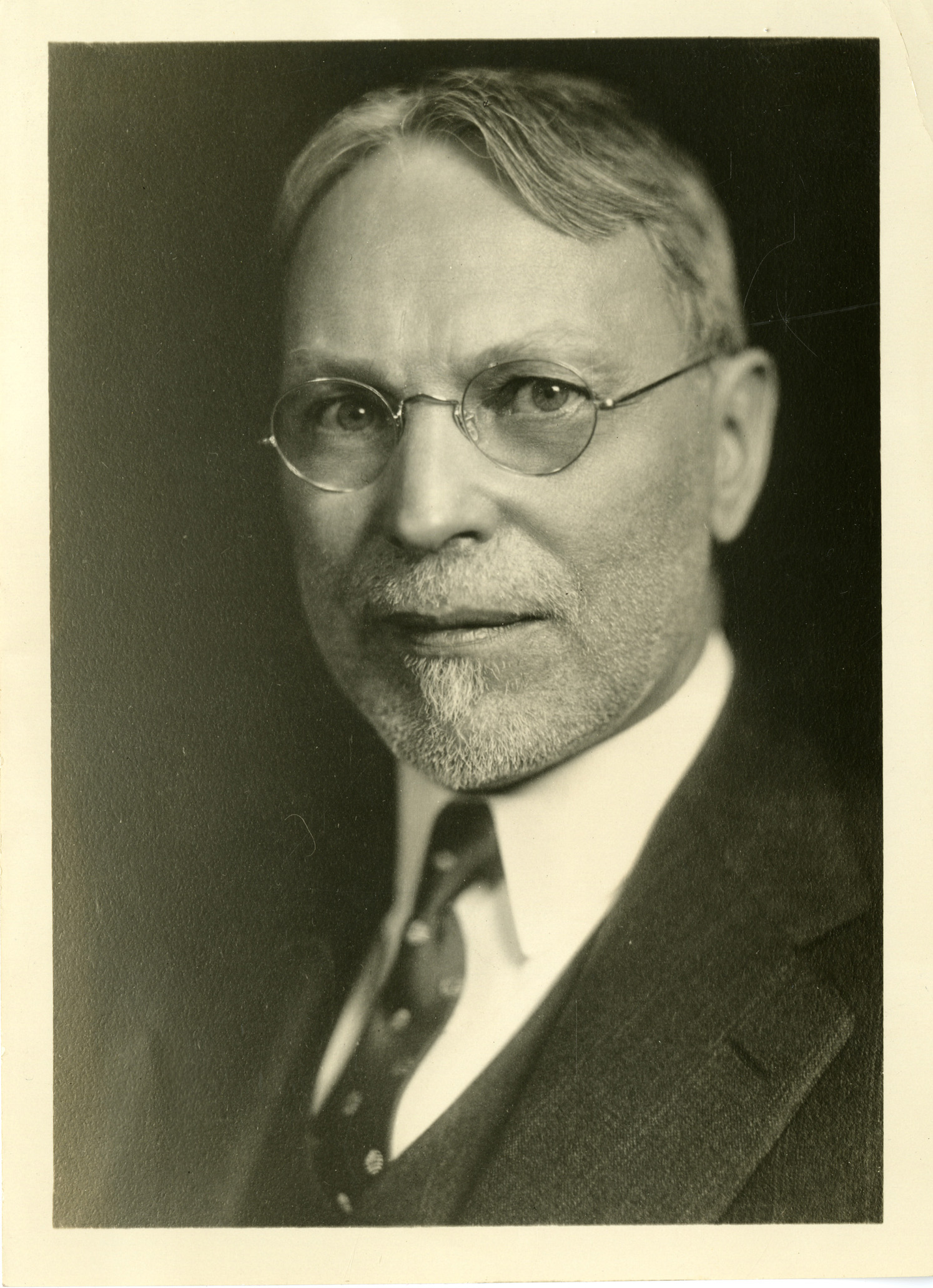

Charles Hubbard Judd (February 20, 1873 – July 18, 1946) was an American educational psychologist who played an influential role in the formation of the discipline. Part of the larger scientific movement of this period, Judd pushed for the use of scientific methods to the understanding of education and, thus, wanted to limit the use of theory in the field. Judd was known for applying scientific methods to the study of educational issues.

Born in Bareilly, British India of American missionary parents, he moved to the United States with his parents Charles Wesley Judd and Sarah Hubbard Judd in 1879. Judd obtained a PhD at the University of Leipzig under the tutelage of Wilhelm Wundt. Judd was director of the Department of Education at the University of Chicago from 1909 to 1938. His works include Genetic Psychology for Teachers, Psychology of Social Institutions and Psychology of High-School Subjects (Boston, 1915).

== Education ==
Judd attended Wesleyan University in Connecticut, receiving his degree in 1894. During his time at Wesleyan he took classes with Andrew Campbell Armstrong who introduced Judd to psychology. He next entered graduate work at the University of Leipzig in Germany, where he studied psychology under the renowned Wilhelm Wundt. Judd got his Ph.D. degree in 1896. Wundt's scientific study of psychology made a lasting impression on Judd. Judd later translated Wundt's Outlines of Psychology into English.

== Profession ==
Charles Hubbard Judd was an educational psychologist. He wrote "Genetic Psychology for Teachers" in 1903, launching his career as an analyst of the psychology of school curriculums. From 1907- 1909 Judd was the director of the psychological laboratory at Yale University; from 1909-1938 Judd was a professor and head of the Department of Education at the University of Chicago from which he retired. Throughout his career Judd published many of his ideas, helping further the field of social psychology. Some of his published work is "Psychology of Social Institutions" in 1926, and "Education as Cultivation of the Higher Mental Processes" in 1936. He worked at New York University in 1898, then went to University of Cincinnati in Ohio in 1900–1901. Then went to Yale in 1901 to teach psychology courses. In 1909 he became the director in the University of Chicago.

== Selected publications ==
- Judd, Charles Hubbard. Psychology of high-school subjects. Ginn and Company, 1915.
- Judd, Charles Hubbard, and Leon Carroll Marshall. Lessons in community and national life. Series B, for the first class of the high school and the upper grades of the elementary school. United States. Bureau of Education; United States. Food and Drug Administration, 1918.
- Judd, Charles Hubbard, and Guy Thomas Buswell. Silent reading: A study of the various types. No. 23. University of Chicago, 1922.
- Judd, Charles Hubbard. The psychology of social institutions. (1926).
