= Clifford Clark =

Canadian economist and civil servant

- Born: William Clifford Clark; April 18, 1889; Martintown, Ontario, Canada
- Died: December 27, 1952 (aged 63); Chicago, Illinois, US

William Clifford Clark (April 18, 1889 – December 27, 1952) was a Canadian professor, economist, and civil servant.

He earned his MA from Queen's University receiving honours in Latin, French, English, History, and Political and Economic Science. He did graduate studies in economics with F. W. Taussig at Harvard. He returned to teach at Queen's in 1915, where he became the first head of the Commerce program in 1919. In 1923, Clark left to work for American investment firm S. W. Straus and Company, returning to Queen's after the company went bankrupt in the Great Depression.

At the instigation of Oscar D. Skelton, Clark wrote a well-received memorandum on monetary policy for the 1932 British Empire Economic Conference in Ottawa. Shortly afterwards, he was appointed Deputy Minister in the Department of Finance by R. B. Bennett, a position he held until his death in 1952. As deputy minister, Clark helped to establish the Bank of Canada in 1934, and he chaired the World War II Economic Advisory Committee. He supported a series of mortgage-assistance measures, and he helped convince Mackenzie King to adopt the 1944 Family Allowance Act. Clark improved the capacity of the Department of Finance by putting together an outstanding group of expert administrators which ushered in a "golden age of Canadian public administration."

The Clifford Clark Visiting Economist position in the federal Department of Finance is named in honour of Clark. Queen's University has established a public policy foundation which jointly honours Clifford Clark and Oscar D. Skelton.

== Works ==
- 1918: (with Eric Walter Zimmerman) Foreign Trade and Shipping, volume 15 in Modern Business series of Alexander Hamilton Institute, New York, link from Internet Archive.
- In Bulletin of the Department of History and Political Science at Queen's University:
  - 1916: The country elevator in the Canadian West
  - 1918: Should maximum prices be fixed?
  - 1921: Business cycles and the depression of 1920–1.
- 1930: (with John Lyndhurst Kingston): The skyscraper; a study in the economic height of modern office buildings.
