= William Taussig =

American physician (1826–1913)

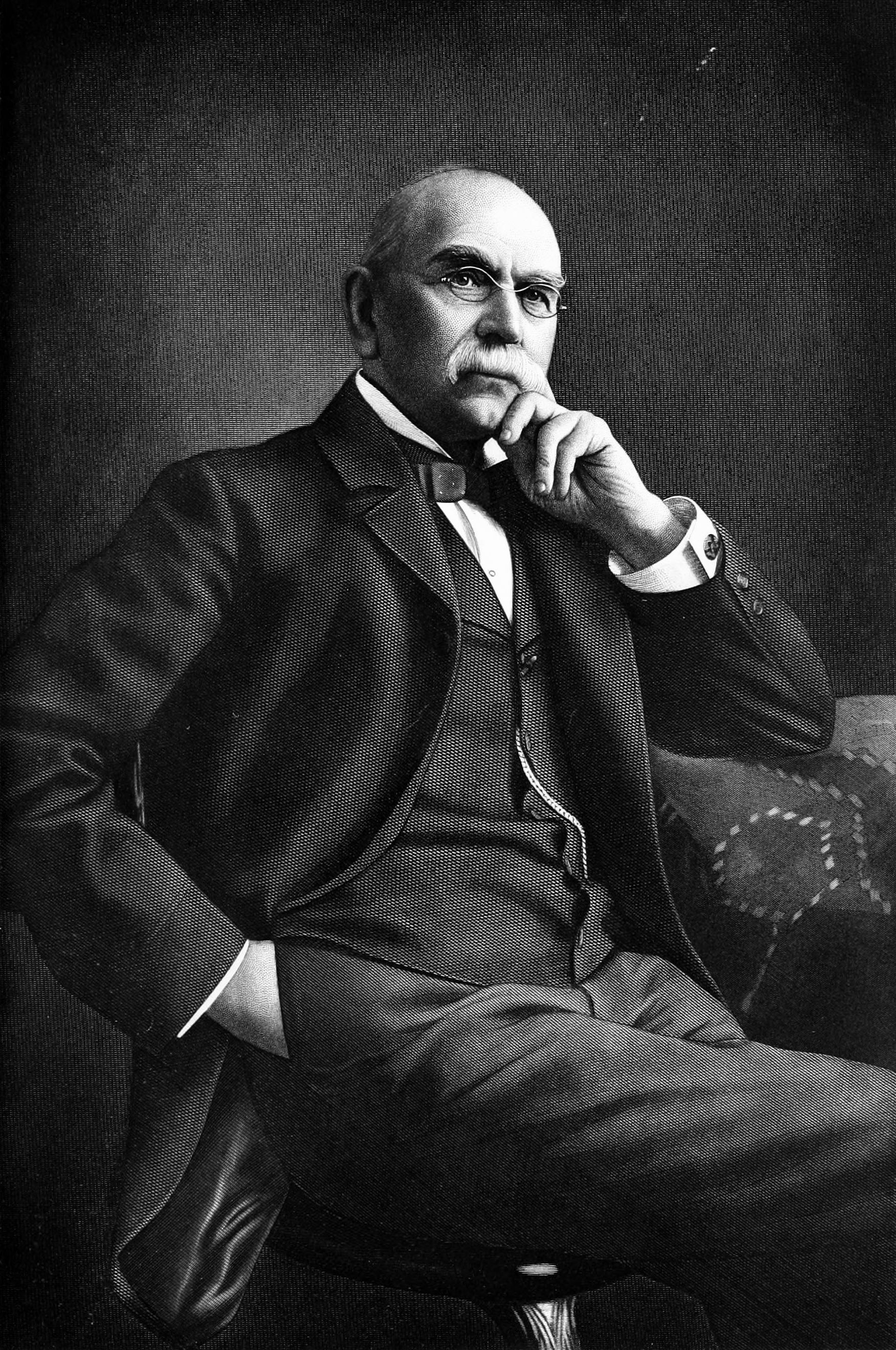

William Taussig (February 28, 1826 – July 10, 1913) was a St. Louis physician and businessperson. He managed the business affairs associated with building the Eads Bridge and its later operation.

== Biography ==
Taussig was born in Prague, the third city of the Austrian Empire and the commercial and manufacturing center of Bohemia. He was educated at the University of Prague, and after completing the classical course, turned his attention to the study of medicine, devoting himself chiefly to chemistry. In 1847, he emigrated to the United States, and for a year was employed in New York City as an analytical chemist. Leaving New York in 1848, he came to St. Louis and soon became connected with the drug house of Charless, Blow & Co. as chemist. To further qualify himself for the practice of medicine, he attended a course of lectures at Pope's Medical College, and then started a medical practice.

During the a cholera epidemic in 1849, he served the city as assistant physician and apothecary at quarantine. In 1851, he moved to Carondelet, then an independent city, now part of St. Louis. There he soon built up a very extensive practice. In 1852, he was elected mayor of the city, and held that office until failing health compelled him to retire from the position, and also to give up his medical practice.

In 1859, he became one of the judges of the St. Louis County Court, joining associates John H. Lightner, Benjamin Farrar, Robert Holmes and John H. Fisse. This court, or board, had almost absolute control of all the financial and administrative affairs of St. Louis County during the Civil War, and on it rested the chief responsibilities of county government. Taussig and his colleagues were chosen as a reform board, their immediate predecessors having drawn popular condemnation for their conduct of county affairs. The court inaugurated numerous reforms. In 1863, Taussig was reelected to the county court; he served as presiding justice until he resigned in 1865.

During Taussig's service, Captain Ulysses S. Grant was rejected for a position as county surveyor. Grant soon afterward went to Galena, Illinois. Later, during a visit to St. Louis, General Grant told Taussig he was indebted to him for his action in the matter.

Taussig was presiding on the county bench when General Sterling Price made his last raid through Missouri and threatened to capture St. Louis. Supported by his associates, Taussig moved to raise two regiments of troops to reinforce the inadequate reserves defending the city under command of General Rosecrans. The much needed additional military force could only be raised by giving generous bounties to encourage the enlistment of troops. The county treasury could not fund the $200,000 expenses of the proposed movement, so Taussig negotiated a loan.

Also during the Civil War, when marauders — calling themselves Confederates — under the command of "Bill" Anderson fell upon the town of Fulton, Missouri, and robbed and destroyed the insane asylum there, the inmates of that institution were left without a place of refuge. Taussig, upon hearing of the disaster, provided for their relief. Accompanied by Captain Bartholomew Guion, he arrived at Fulton, and speedily organized a relief movement with the assistance of residents in the vicinity. He gathered together those who had been inmates of the asylum, over two hundred in number, and loaded them into vehicles of various kinds, and finally landed them at Mexico, Missouri. The region traversed was infested with guerrillas, and Taussig and his party had no military escort; however, they reached their destination in safety and proceeded by rail to St. Louis. Here, by previous arrangement, the doors of St. Vincent Asylum were thrown open to them.

While serving on the county court bench Taussig was also examining surgeon for the First Military District, by appointment of President Lincoln, his duty in this connection being to pass upon the physical condition of men drafted into the Union Army. In 1865 he was appointed United States Internal Revenue collector by President Lincoln, the second appointee to that office in St. Louis. Soon after the war, he became first president of the Traders' Bank.

He joined James B. Eads in the project to construct a bridge across the Mississippi River. At the first meeting of the executive committee of the Illinois & St. Louis Bridge & Tunnel Company he was appointed chairman, and from that time until his retirement in 1896 managed the vast interests connected with the bridge and tunnel. The only other enterprise with which he was identified during that time was the North Missouri Railway Company, of which he served two years as director. In July 1874, upon completion of the bridge, he was appointed general manager of the St. Louis Bridge Company, the Tunnel Railroad Company, the Union Railway & Transit Company, and the Union Depot Company, all of which interests were finally, by lease and purchase, combined under the general ownership and control of the Terminal Railroad Association of St. Louis. This association made Taussig its president in 1889, and from that time forward until the date of its completion he devoted himself to the perfection of a railroad terminal system for St. Louis and to the building of the Union Depot.

In 1872, he joined Carl Schurz, Emil Preetorius, Gratz Brown, William M. Grosvenor and Henry T. Blow in the Liberal Republican Party.

== Family ==
In 1857, Taussig married Adele Wuerpel of St. Louis. Their son Frank William Taussig became professor of political economy in Harvard College. F. W. Taussig's last publication was "My Father's Business Career," Harvard Business Review, 1941.
