= Leon C. Marshall =

American economist (1879–1966)

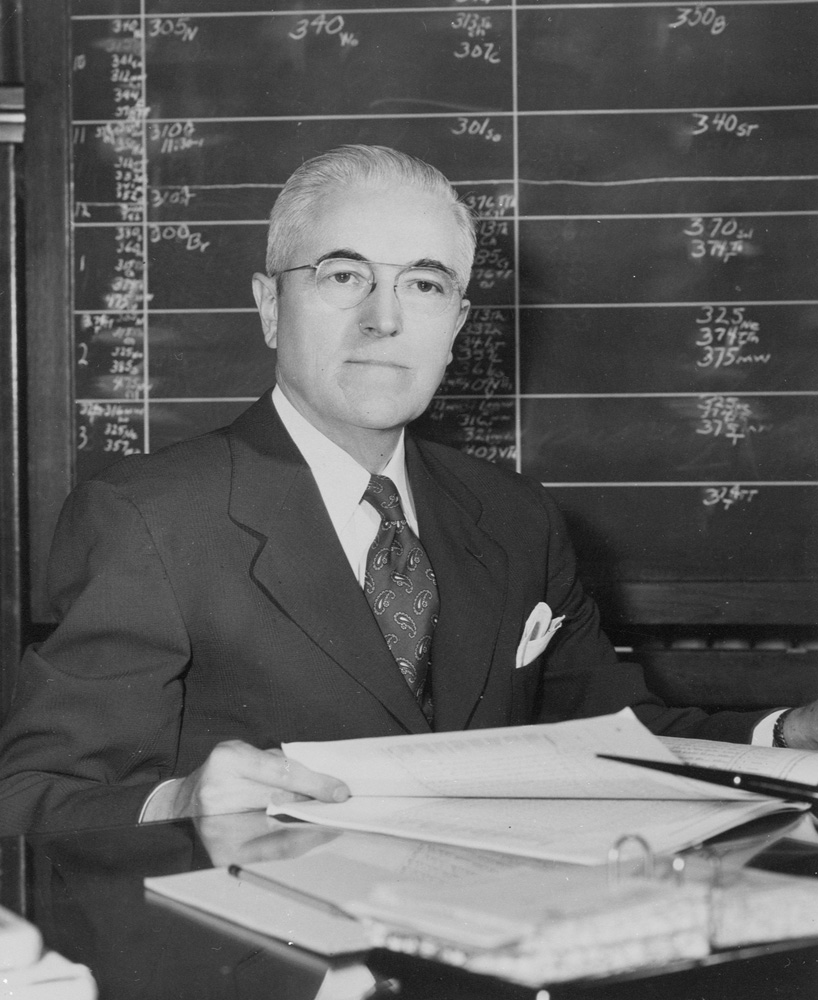
- Leon Carroll Marshall at the University of Chicago, c. 1920.
- Born: March 15, 1879; Zanesville, Ohio
- Died: March 1966 (aged 86–87)

Academic background
- Education: Ohio Wesleyan University, Harvard University, Ohio Wesleyan University

Academic work
- Discipline: Political Economy, economic organization, and business administration
- Institutions: Booth School of Business, Johns Hopkins University

Leon Carroll Marshall (March 15, 1879 – March 1966) was an American economist, Professor of Political Economy and fourth dean of the Booth School of Business from 1909 to 1924, Professor at the Law School of the Johns Hopkins University, and Professor at the American University. He is known for his works on our economic organization, business administration, curriculum-making in the social studies and the divorce court, as well as his involvement in the Bohemian Grove.

== Biography ==
Born in Zanesville, Ohio in 1879, Marshall in 1900 obtained his BA at the Ohio Wesleyan University, and in 1902 his MA from Harvard University, Later on in 1918 he obtained his law degree at the Ohio Wesleyan University.

Marshall started his academic career at the business school of the University of Chicago, the Booth School of Business, where he became Professor of Political Economy and was fourth dean of the business school from 1909 to 1924. Sequentially he moved to the Johns Hopkins University, where he was professor and director of its Institute of Law from 1928 to 1933. In 1934 Marshall was appointed by President Franklin D. Roosevelt as member of the National Labor Board and of the National Recovery Administration to support Roosevelt's New Deal policies and the "measure and combat the effects of the Great Depression." He also became a member of the National Educational Association. From 1936 to 1948 Marshall was Professor of Political Economy at American University in Washington, D.C.

Marshall wrote several textbooks on Social Studies topics at the secondary school and grade-school level, starting with Materials For the Study of Elementary Economics in 1913 coauthored with James A. Field (1879–1927) and Chester Whitney Wright (1880–1966).

== Work ==
Marshall came into prominence in the years from 1913 to 1919, when he was involved with professor of Economics James A. Field and the economic historian Chester W. Wright in "attempts to move economics instruction away from the 'rigorous drill in orthodox theory' or the 'straight-jacket of conventional theory' to a method of instruction emphasizing the development of economic institutions, inquiry into current problems and issues, and fostering of creativity and originality (field 1917). To this end, they produced a book of readings to supplement the usual texts (Marshall, Wright, and Field 1913)."

=== Readings in Industrial Society, 1918 ===
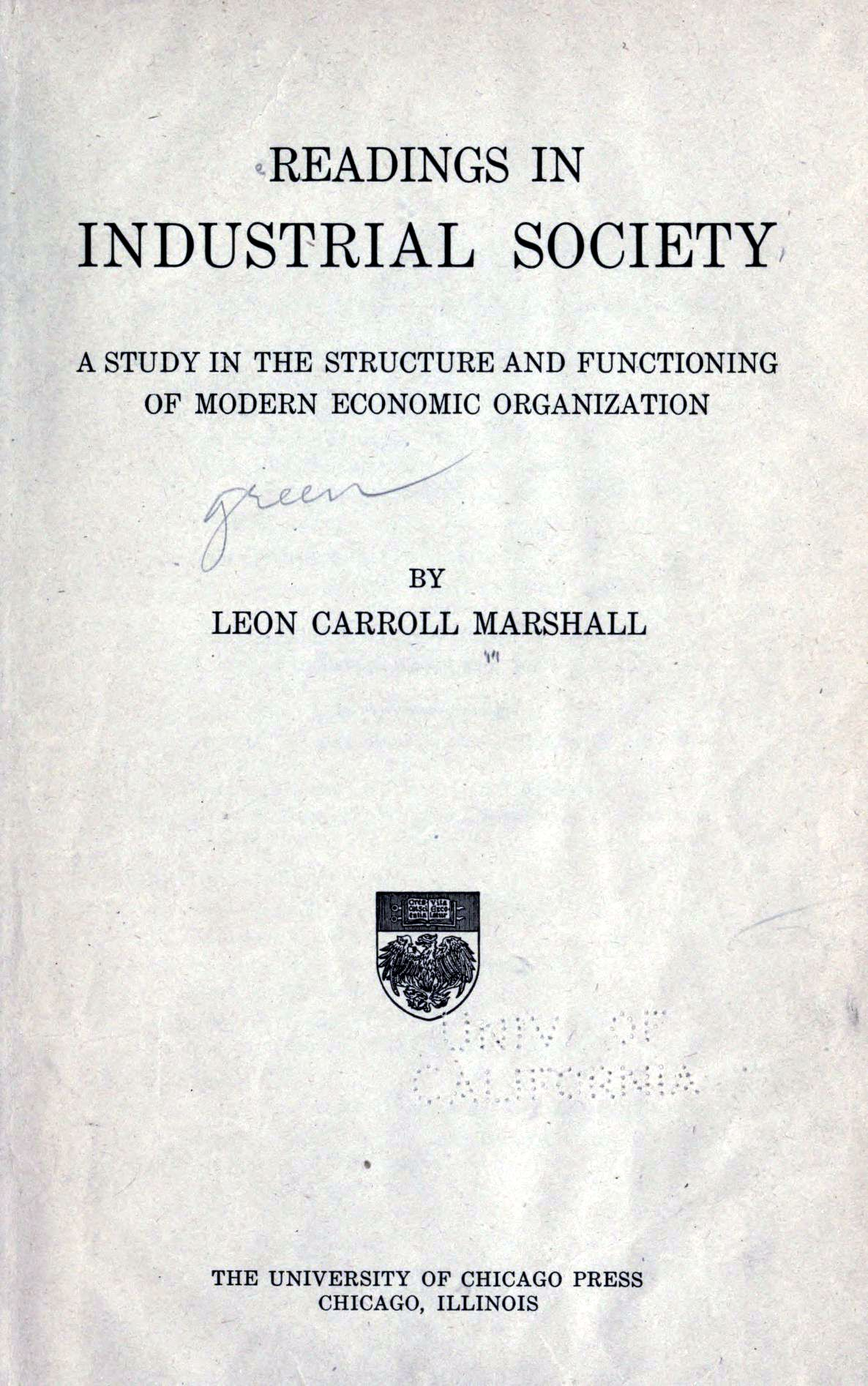
Title page, 1918/20.

In 1918 Marshall published his Readings in Industrial Society. This work had a heavy emphasis on the institutional development of industrial society, the money economy and financial organization, machine industry, the wage system and the worker, industrial concentration, competition, private property, and social control."

The work contained reading from founders of the institutional economics such as Thorstein Veblen, Wesley Clair Mitchell, Walton H. Hamilton, Harold G. Moulton, Robert F. Hoxie, John M. Clark, Edwin Cannan, and John A. Hobson. He also reprinted diagrams from the work of Henry Rogers Seager, picturing the economic production and distribution from 1904, and Paul Nystrom, picturing the channels of distribution for various lines of goods from 1915.

Leon Ardzrooni, known as "Veblen's most faithful disciple", reviewed the book for Political Science Quarterly, and introduced the work as follows:

As indicated in the subtitle of this formidable volume, the author has brought together a large array of descriptive material for " a study in the structure and functioning of economic organization." Among a considerable number of students in the social sciences the feeling has been growing that economics, as studied in our colleges and universities, lacks the substance and security which is often obtained in other fields of intellectual endeavor by a happy coordination of historical perspective and speculative logomachy. With a view to attain such an end, there have appeared in recent years several volumes of " selected readings " for the study of economics and economic problems. The present one is a creditable addition to this goodly list in the publication of which the University of Chicago Press has taken a leading part.

Clarence Edwin Ayres explicitly regarded "Marshall's book as a contribution to the institutional type of economics."

=== Our economic organization, 1921 ===
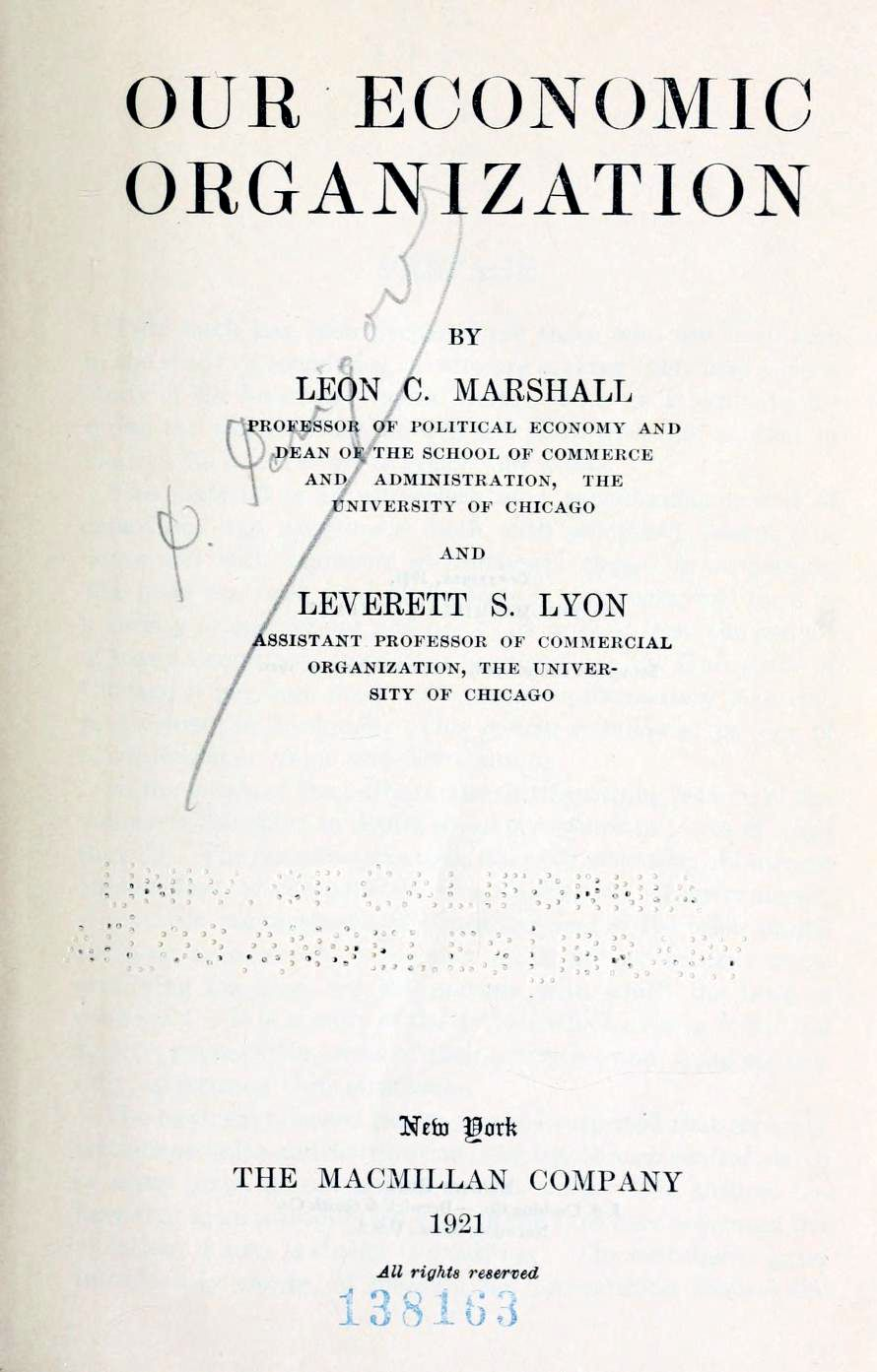
Title page, 1921

In 1921 Marshall and Leverett S. Lyon (1885–1959) published their "Our economic organization." The main purpose of this book in the field of elementary economics is to present in systematic fashion the structure of economic society under the spur of competition.

The treatment is necessarily brief on account of the large number of topics to be covered, and also on account of the requirements of an elementary text book. The approach is functional. The authors stated in its preface the purpose is to present economic organization in its functional aspect, to show in some detail not so much what the organization is as how it operates.

The distinguishing feature of the volume is the effort to depict social structures in terms of what they do. The functions, the uses, the work, of banks, of business organization, of competition, of specialization, of government, of scientific management, of education, and of other multitudinous agencies which together make up our want-gratifying machine, are the matters with which the book is concerned.

And more even specific "it is a study of the devices which exist in industrial society, primarily in terms of their activities, and, quite secondarily, in terms of their structures."

==== Economic organization compared to machine; a process approach to economics ====
In a 1921 review of the work The American Economic Review, by Everett Walton Goodhue (1878–1940s), Professor of Sociology and Economics at Colgate University, Goodhue explained, that this work compares the economic organization to machine, and introduces a process approach (or systems approach) to economics. Goodhue (1921) explained.

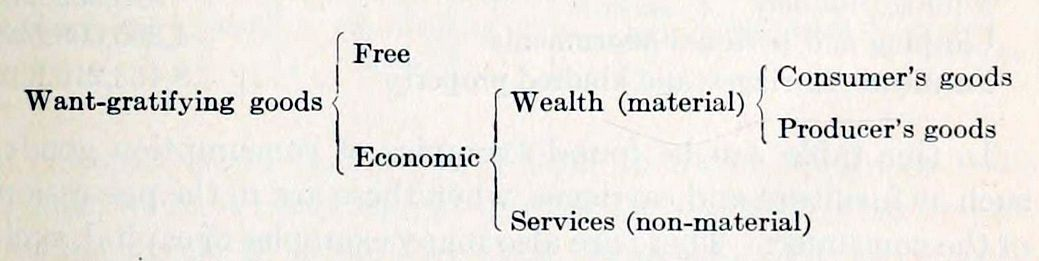
Diagram of want-gratifying goods.

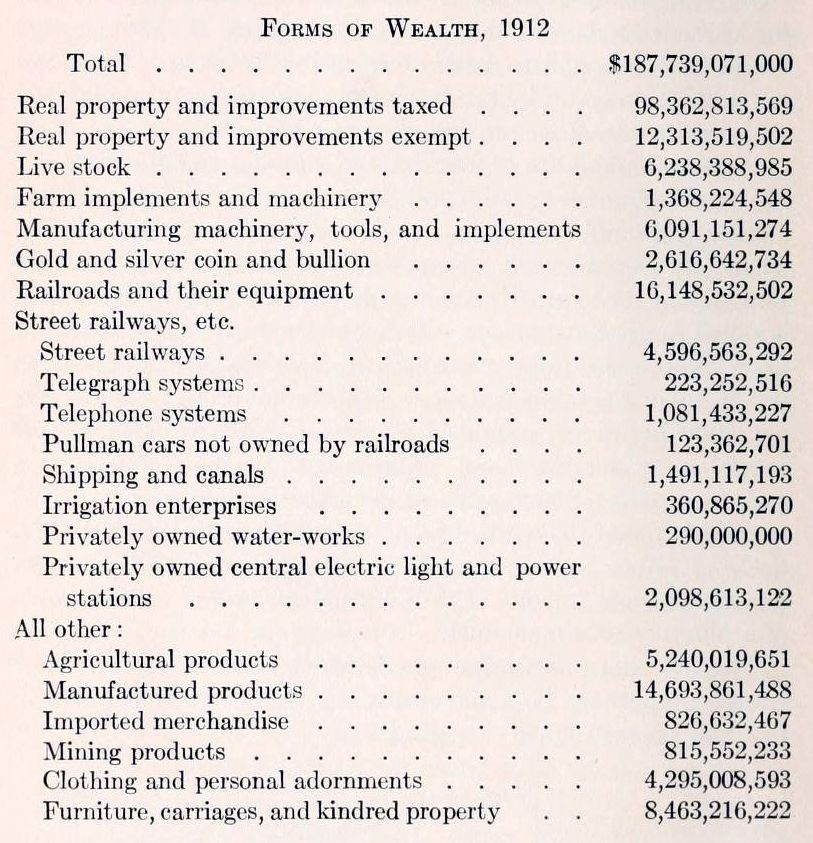
Different forms of Wealth in 1912.

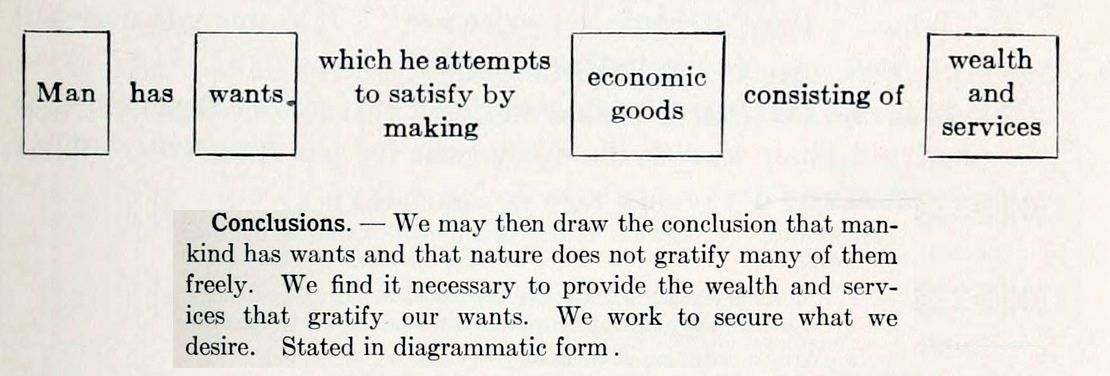
Diagram of gratifying wants, 1921

Our economic organization is compared to a machine with parts, articulation of parts, motive power, and control or guidance. No one claims that the machine at all times or perhaps at any time works perfectly. There are still many defects. Some parts are not well adapted to their uses; parts rattle, jam and squeak; too much or perchance at times too little motive power is applied; and at times (business depressions) the whole machine seems to break down. Despite the defects, however, the machine functions and is surprisingly well adapted to its purpose of producing goods in quantity, of producing them at right times, and of getting them into the hands of consumers with some accuracy and comparatively little difficulty.
The real test of any good machine is that it be designed for its purpose and that it accomplish that purpose at as low a cost as possible under the conditions which prevail at the time. Our economic machine appears to fulfill these conditions. On this point, indeed, many earnest students of economics honestly doubt the truth of the above statement. They see glaring faults of economy and justice, and take decided exception to the proposition that the present economic organization is adapted to its purpose. Possibly in the past, it is said, but certainly not today.

The complete work is illustrated with over 100 illustrations; tables, schemes, pictures, drawings, maps, graphs, block diagrams, tree diagrams, classification and organization charts, presenting a mix of empirical and theoretical data. The process approach is recognizable in the visualization of some specific economic phenomena in diagrams, such as the diagram of gratifying wants (see image).

Goodhue (1921) further explained, that the book at the outset rather assumes human wants and the goods to gratify those wants. Its interest lies in the field of processes. The aim was to start the student in elementary economics with a study of our want gratifying machine, to show him how this machine has come to be, and how it serves its purpose in apportioning our social resources, viz: labor power, capital, acquired knowledge and natural resources to the production and sale of goods.

Although this approach to economics in its time was somewhat new and rather unorthodox, nevertheless there was much to be said in its favor, according to Goodhue (1921):

- It serves at the outset to develop an interest in economics in the mind of the student, a thing much to be desired.
- It introduces the student to something with which he is a bit familiar, instead of very early in the course dropping him down into the midst of an elusive exposition of marginal utility and marginal cost.
- In describing for the student the existing system of economic organization it better prepares him to grasp the difficulties of terminology and theory on which the organization is based.

Reviewing the book in ''The American Economic Review'', Everett W. Goodhue wrote that it "goes far to solve that most difficult problem of arousing student interest," describing it as "eminently practical, readable, and suggestive."

==== Topics discussed in the book ====
The topics discussed in the book are in the main those of Professor Marshall's more pretentious work Readings in Industrial Society. The first two chapters on human wants and social resources aim to show the reasons for any form of economic organization.

Then follow six chapters on English industrial history which, as the authors state, "are not 'historical' in any orthodox sense of the term. They are a somewhat more extended view of the problem at issue." The remainder of the book is taken up with a functionalized description of the economic organization of the United States. There are four chapters on specialization, two on machine industry, three on business organization, three on the province of the enterpriser, two each on money and financial organization and the utilization of natural and human resources, and one on planning, guiding, and controlling.

==== Reception ====
A 1921 review of this work by Goodhue, states that:

... it is clear that what should be included, what should be excluded, where the emphasis should be placed is largely a matter of choice, and is somewhat dependent upon the purpose the authors have in mind. Not all topics which quite fall within the scope of the book can be equally well treated, especially if the work is elementary in character. It may be a source of disappointment to certain readers that the authors have done little more than to suggest or imply at some points in their discussion the motive forces of organization. We find comparatively little on gain-seeking, prices, competition, property, contract, and the necessities for interdependence.

And furthermore:

The book does not pretend to cover the entire field of economics. It is designed merely as an introductory text and can well be combined with some one of the standard works on the Principles of Economics. As a stimulating, attractive, readable book it is a great success. The authors should be complimented on making available this material on economic organization in such a clear and teachable form. The practical questions at the end of each chapter are helpful and suggestive, and add a good deal to the teachable qualities of the book.

== Selected publications ==
- Field, James Alfred; Marshall, Leon Carroll; Wright, Chester Whitney. Materials For the Study of Elementary Economics, University of Chicago Press, 1913.
- Judd, Charles Hubbard, and Leon Carroll Marshall. Lessons in community and national life. Series B, for the first class of the high school and the upper grades of the elementary school. United States. Bureau of Education; United States. Food and Drug Administration, 1918.
- Marshall, Leon Carroll, Readings in industrial society; a study in the structure and functioning of modern economic organization. Chicago : University of Chicago Press, 1920.
- Leon C. Marshall and Leverett S. Lyon. Our economic organization. New York : Te Macmillan Company, 1921.
- Marshall, Leon Carroll, Business administration. Chicago, Ill., The University of Chicago press, 1921.
- Marshall, Leon Carroll. The story of human progress. The Macmillan company, 1925.
- Marshall, L. C., May, G., Marquard, E. L., & Reticker. The Divorce Court. Johns Hopkins Press, 1932.
- Marshall, Leon Carroll, and Rachel Marshall Goetz. Curriculum-making in the Social Studies. C. Scribner's sons, 1936.
