= James A. Field =

American economist (1880–1927)

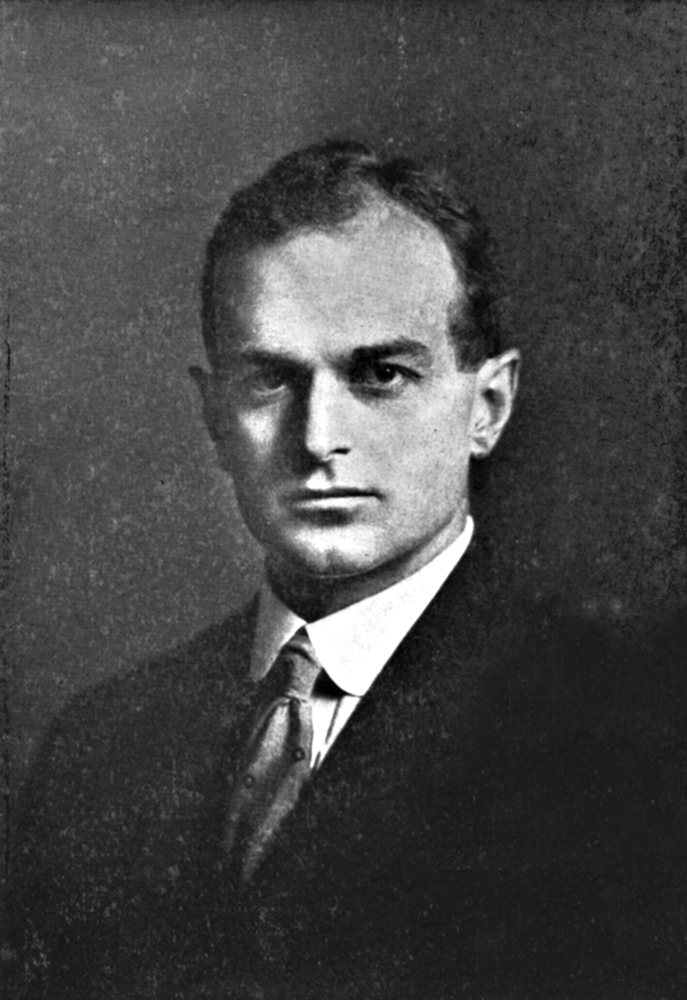
- Born: James Alfred Field; May 26, 1880; Milton, Massachusetts, U.S.
- Died: July 16, 1927 (aged 47); Boston, Massachusetts, U.S.
- Spouse: Amy Morehead Walker (m. 1914)
- Children: 2

Academic background
- Education: Harvard University (MS); University of Berlin

Academic work
- Institutions: University of Chicago

James Alfred Field (May 26, 1880 – July 16, 1927) was an American economist and Professor of Political Economy at the University of Chicago, known as one of the proponents of institutional economics and as demographer, who contributed to the theory of population and its history.

== Life and work ==
James Alfred Field obtained was born on May 26, 1880, in Milton, Massachusetts, to Caroline Leslie (née Whitney) and James Alfred Field. He attended Milton Academy. He obtained a MS in economics at Harvard University in 1903, and continued to do post-graduate work at Harvard for two years and at the University of Berlin for a year as the Jacob Wendall scholar.

Field started his academic career in 1903 as assistant in economics at Harvard University, and became Austin teaching fellow in economics from 1904 to 1905, and instructor in 1906 to 1908. From 1906 to 1908 he was also instructor in economics at Radcliffe College. In 1908 he started at the University of Chicago as instructor in economics, and was promoted assistant professor in 1910, associate professor in 1913, and full professor in 1918 until his death in 1927. In the year 1923-24 he was also dean of the College of Arts and Literature.

Field was also known as founding president of the Illinois Birth Control League, and associate editor of the Journal of Political Economy. In 1917, he was special investigator for the Council of National Defense in its division of statistics during World War I. From 1918 to 1919, he was chief statistician of the Allied Maritime Transport Council in London.. He was elected fellow of the American Statistical Association.

== Work ==
Field came into prominence in the years from 1913 to 1919, when he was involved with professor of Economics Leon C. Marshall and the economic historian Chester W. Wright in "attempts to move economics instruction away from the 'rigorous drill in orthodox theory' or the 'straight-jacket of conventional theory' to a method of instruction emphasizing the development of economic institutions, inquiry into current problems and issues, and fostering of creativity and originality (field 1917). To this end, they produced a book of readings to supplement the usual texts (Marshall, Wright, and Field 1913)."

=== Essays on population, and other papers, 1931 ===
In a 1931 review of "Essays on population, and other papers..." in The Eugenics Review Norman E. Himes (1899–1949), wrote:

THIS volume, by one of the greatest demographers America has produced, is a notable contribution to population thought and its history. An original, meticulously accurate scholar, Field has, unfortunately, been little known to European, and especially to Continental scholars. It is a great service, therefore, that one of his students should collect his more important scattered papers and notes, and edit them so ably. The solidity of the volume is matched by a felicity of literary presentation rarely found among economic writers; a combination especially refreshing in this day in America when, with growing numbers in our colleges, almost every underpaid professor becomes the hack author of a dull, poorly-written text-book.
The range of topics is wide. Part I contains twelve essays on eugenics, birth control, and Malthusianism, the treatment being essentially historical and critical. Part II collects three papers on economics and statistics, while Part III is a catalogue of the author's library on population. Since the Dictionary of American Biography has failed to include the career of Field, it is fitting that the editor has added a short biography together with a distinctive photograph of the author.

And more specific about its content:

I have always felt-perhaps there is a personal bias-that Essay III on "The Early Propagandist Movement in English Population Theory" was the best paper Field ever published. I know of no finer example of historico-economic research in the English language, no matter what tests are applied. Though Professor Graham Wallas deserves credit also, it is not an ungenerous distinction to say that Field was the first scholar to appraise in full measure Francis Place's efforts for birth control at the beginning of the last century. Much of the Place correspondence which Dr. Stopes has upon various occasions claimed to have " discovered " was known to, and used by, Field.
Essays IV, V, and IX are specifically on eugenics. They are Galtonian in idealism; but the author is mindful of the numerous difficulties. The article reprinted from the Quarterly Journal of Economics is an excellent historical and critical review of euge-nical literature produced up to the time of publication (1911). Regrettably, the author never followed it up.

== Personal life ==
Field married Amy Morehead Walker, daughter of judge Charles M. Walker, on September 17, 1914. They had two sons, James Alfred Jr. and Charles Walker.

Field died of a brain tumor on July 15, 1927, in Boston.

== Selected publications ==
- Field, James Alfred. Progress of Eugenics
- Marshall, Leon Carroll, Chester Whitney Wright, and James Alfred Field. Outlines of Economics Developed in a Series of Problems. University of Chicago Press, 1910, 1911, 1912.
- Field, James Alfred; Marshall, Leon Carroll; Wright, Chester Whitney. Materials For the Study of Elementary Economics, University of Chicago Press, 1913.
- Field, James Alfred. Essays on population, and other papers. No. 1. Richard s Barnes & Co, 1931.
