= Harold F. Williamson =

American economist

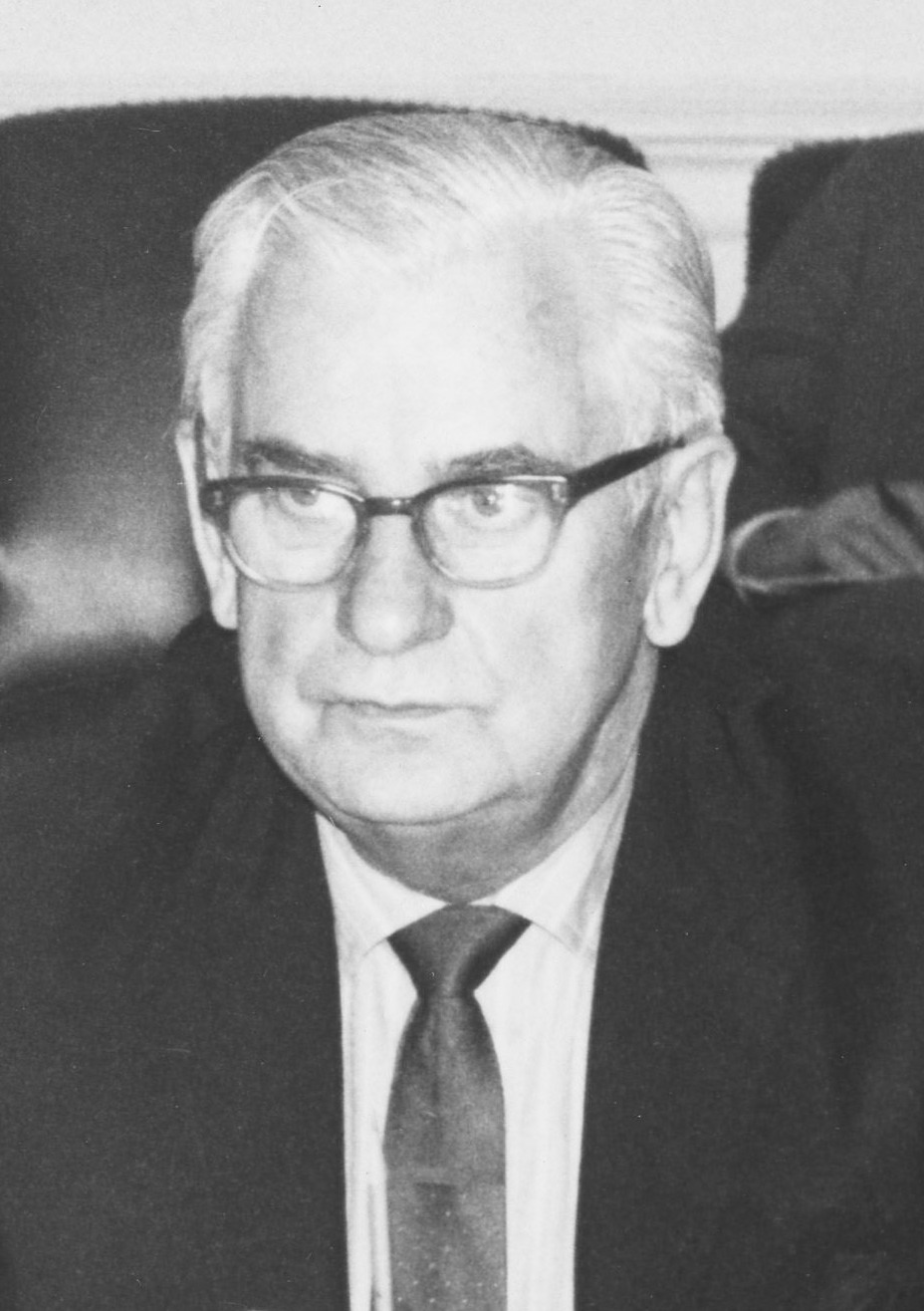
Williamson in 1970

Harold Francis Williamson Sr. (March 21, 1901 – October 25, 1989) was an American business historian, and Professor of American and European economic history at Northwestern University, most known for his 1963 work on the history of the American petroleum industry.

== Biography ==
Born in Piper, Kansas to Samuel Williamson and Ella Watson, Williamson obtained his AB in economics 1924 from the University of Southern California, where in 1926 he also obtained his MA in economics. In 1930 he obtained a second MA from Harvard University, where in 1936 he obtained his PhD with the thesis, entitled "Edward Atkinson, The Biography of an American Liberal, 1827-1905" on Edward Atkinson.

Williamson had started his academic career teaching economic history at the University of Southern California. After moving to Boston he taught at Massachusetts Institute of Technology and at Harvard University. In 1948 he was appointed Professor of American and European economic history at Northwestern University, where he worked until his retirement in 1969. In his lectures he "placed the developments of American and European economic history in technological, sociological, geographic, and political context, enlivened with many examples of technological developments."

Williamson had two sons: Harold Williamson Jr., who was a professor of economics at University of Illinois, and Samuel H. Williamson, who was a professor of economics at University of Miami (Ohio) and co-founder of the Cliometric Society.

== Selected publications ==
- Edward Atkinson: Biography of an American Liberal (1935)
- The American Carpet Manufacturers (with Arthur Cole, 1940)
- The Growth of the American Economy (ed.) (1941 and 1953)
- Winchester: The Gun That Won the West (1952)
- Economic Development, Principles and Patterns (ed.)(with John Buttrick, 1954)
- Designed for Digging: The First 75 Years of Bucyrus-Erie Company (with Kenneth Myers, 1955)
- Northwestern Mutual Life: A Century of Trusteeship (with Orange A. Smalley, 1959)
- The American Petroleum Industry (with Arnold Daum, 1959 and with Ralph Andreano et al., 1964).
- Evolution of International Management Structures (ed.) (1975)
- Northwestern University: A History, 1850-1975 (with Payson S. Wild, 1976)
- The Evolution of Management Education, a History of the J. L. Kellogg Graduate School of Management, 1908-1983 (with Michael W. Sedlak, 1983).
