= Theresa McMahon =

Economist, political scientist, author, and activist

Theresa Schmid McMahon (April 29, 1878-June 27, 1961) was an American economist, political scientist, author, and activist. She earned her PhD in sociology at the University of Wisconsin. She taught in the Department of Economics at the University of Washington for 26 years.

== Publications ==
- McMahon, T. S. (1912). Women and economic evolution: Or, The effects of industrial changes upon the status of women. Madison, Wis: publisher not identified.
- McMahon, T. S. (1925). Social and economic standards of living. Boston: D.C. Heath and Co.
