= Margaret G. Reid =

Economist (1896–1991)

Margaret Gilpin Reid (1896 – 1991) was an economist in the area of household production, housework and non-market activities.

== Life ==
Margaret Gilpin Reid was born in 1896 in Cardale, Manitoba in Canada, and completed a degree in Home Economics at the University of Manitoba in 1921. She received her PhD from the University of Chicago in 1931 titled The Economics of Household Production. She taught at Connecticut College, Iowa State College (Iowa State University) and later the University of Chicago, where she received tenure as a Professor of Home Economics and Economics. She became emeritus in 1961.

Reid served as an economic advisor to the Division of Statistical Standards during 1943 and 1944. She served as the Head of Family Economics for the Department of Agriculture. She returned to academia in 1948 as a full professor in economics at the University of Chicago. She was also a member of the Association of Public and Land-grant Universities.

== Economics ==
Margaret G. Reid was a pioneer in the research on the importance of non-market activities, especially of the household for the economy. Her work included household production and consumption, relationships between health, income and productivity and housework.

Her first book, Economics of Household Production, was published in 1934. Reid, like her PhD advisor Hazel Kyrk, sought to theorize the productive contribution made by domestic activities within the household. She argued for a national accounting that included non-market activities to better mirror economic activities. Furthermore, she called for the recognition of unpaid work and delivered a pragmatic definition for work itself as activities that have a positive utility and could be transferred through a market (even if they are not produced for a market). Feminist economists would later argue that this work was underappreciated and even ignored, pointing out its similarity to Gary Becker's 1965 Nobel-prize winning theory of time allocation.

After becoming emeritus, she continued to research and write until her death in 1991. In later years her work was preoccupied with the relationship between demographic factors such as age, race, health, and income, and productivity and consumption.

The American Economic Association named Reid a Distinguished Fellow in 1980, recognizing her as a "truly tireless colleague" whose contributions to the field were complemented by a "felicitous sense of humour." In 1996 Feminist Economics devoted an issue to recognizing her research.
