= List of wars involving Fiji =

A number of wars occurred throughout Fijian history, from the Fijian tribes (pre 1871) to the Kingdom of Fiji (1871–1874), Colony of Fiji (1874–1970), Dominion of Fiji (1970–1987), and the Republic of Fiji (1987–present).

== Fijian tribes (pre 1871) ==
Conflict	Combatant 1	Combatant 2	Results	Casualties
Battle of Nawaidamudamu (Late 1700s)	Vutia	Kalabu	Decisive Victory for Kalabu	350 slain
Battle of Nayau	Cicia	Lakeba	Lakeba Victory (Mataisalia Tui Cicia slain, many warriors slain, survivors enslaved)	?
Battle of Vauroka	Nadi people, Sikituru (Yavusa Saunivalu)	Sabeto people	Nadi-Sikituru Victory (Sikituru assisted Nadi people against Sabeto)	?
Battle of Kedekede	Vuaka Loa (led by Nakorotubu)	Lakeba	Vuaka Loa Victory (4 women given as "qusi ni loaloa")	?
Attack of Malomalo and Wai	Nabekasiga (grandson of Wakanimolikula), Nadroga warriors	Namotutu people, Malomalo, Wai villages	Decisive Victory for Nadroga (Villages of Malomalo and Wai ravaged, many killed, survivors fled/taken prisoner, lands taken by Nabekasiga; later re-established by Nakadriudriu. Nabekasiga killed at Narara after continuing campaign up Sigatoka River.)	Many killed Some taken prisoner Nabekasiga killed
Battle of Wairiki	Tui Cakau (Ratu Golea), Cakaudrove warriors, Catholic missionaries (Father Favre)	Ma'afu (Tongan Prince), Wainiqolo (Tongan warlord), Tongan forces	Decisive Victory for Cakaudrove (Preservation of Cakaudrove autonomy, significant conversion to Catholicism)	Many Tongan casualties (some reportedly eaten); Cakaudrove: ?
Conflict of Navatu (Nawaqalevu vs. Mulase Dispute)	Mulase (Vusatabua supporters); Navatu people	Nawaqalevu; Nalawa army Rakiraki army	Decisive Victory for Navatu/Mulase (Rakiraki army repelled, 'Eki of Nalawa killed, Navatu claimed independence from Tu Navitilevu authority)	'Eki (strong man of Nalawa) killed Others: ?
Battle of Suva (Denison and Duncan Roads)	Suva scouts Suva army	Vuna men Rō Camaisala	Decisive Victory for Suva (Rō Camaisala fatally speared, Vuna army fled, cannibal feast ensued)	Rō Camaisala killed Others: ?
Battle of Drekeniwai (Wainibuka)	Nayavu; Bau; Wailevu	Nasautoka; Qelema	Victory for Nayavu, Bau & Wailevu	?
**Attack on Wakaya** (c. 1838)	Tui Levuka; Ovalau warriors	Wakaya	Decisive Victory for Ovalau (Wakayan men of Korolevu killed, women captured; Wakayan chief perished)	Wakayan men: all killed Wakayan women: all captured Wakayan Chief: killed
**Battle of Matari Beach**	Yale army	Tavuki warriors	Decisive Victory for Yale (Tavuki warriors killed)	Tavuki warriors: 40+ killed Others: ?
**Namena Massacre** (1839)	Viwa	Namena	Decisive Victory for Viwa (Namena people, while visiting Viwa, were massacred)	Namena: Many killed 80 women were strangled in the 'loloku' ritual in response
**Battle of Qereqere**	Tui Daku and his warriors	Kaibu islanders	Decisive Victory for Tui Daku (Kaibu was attacked, survivors taken captive)	?
Battle of Nasolo	Dreketi	Drakaniwai army (from Lekutu)	Decisive Victory for Dreketi (Drakaniwai army butchered, survivors fled)	Drakaniwai army: Many butchered, some fled Others: ?
Battle of Waidranudranu	Vuya	Bua (Navotua warriors)	Decisive Victory for Vuya (Sabebelo and all his army slaughtered)	Sabebelo and entire Bua/Navotua army slaughtered
Battle of Waimate (Lami)	Natodre people Lami people	Lomaivuna army	Decisive Victory for Natodre/Lami (Lomaivuna army killed in a river nearby, their attempt to take over Lami repelled)	Lomaivuna army: All or many killed Others: ?
Battle of Matava	Kadavu warriors (led by the Ratu/chief)	Rewa warriors	Decisive Victory for Kadavu (Rewa warriors defeated, battle site named Matava)	?
Battle of Tavarua	Malolo (assisted by Viwa)	Yaravoro (Kwa Levu of Nadroga); Nadroga people	Decisive Victory for Malolo/Viwa (Yaravoro and Nadroga people clubbed)	Yaravoro killed Nadroga people: ?
Attack on Nawaka (Navo-NoiVulani vs. Nawaka Alliance)	Navo; NoiVulani (under instructions from Navula)	Nawaka people Noi Naiqoro; Naua; Utiloaloa	Decisive Victory for Nawaka Alliance (Attackers repelled, Navo village burned, Navo and NoiVulani scattered)	?
**Battle of Vatukoro**	Yalatina; Navatusila; Nadrakuma; Navakadevo	Bau	Decisive Victory for the Highland Tribes (Bau forces defeated)	Bau: ~70 warriors killed Highland Tribes: ?
**Battle of Qoibau**	Macuata army	Labasa tribes	Decisive Victory for Labasa (Macuata army defeated)	?
**Battle of Yasawa (Matacawalevu-Nacula vs Teci)**	Tui Bua; Matacawalevu; Tamasua (Yasawairara)	Teci; Nacula	Decisive Victory for Tui Bua and Allies (Teci forces were worsted)	?
**Quarrel of the Yam Gardens** (or **Battle of Navo**)	Noi Navo	Vucunisai; Kai Loa	Decisive Victory for Vucunisai and Kai Loa (Noi Navo, armed only with digging sticks, were attacked and chased from their gardens)	Noi Navo: Several slain Others: ?
**Battle of Nairaiwaqa**	Drau (Nadereivalu)	Waimaro (Nagonenicolo)	Decisive Victory for Nadereivalu (Nadereivalu forces ambushed and slaughtered the Waimaro-Nagonenicolo army)	Waimaro-Nagonenicolo army: Slaughtered; Others: ?
**Sack of Rewa Lomanikoro**	Bau; Tokatoka; Burebasaga	Rewa	Decisive Victory for Bau and Allies (Lomanikoro sacked and burned, over 300 slaughtered, Rewa's capital devastated, Kania targeted but escaped)	Over 300 slaughtered (Rewa); Kania (Tui Dreketi) survived Others: ?
**Battle of Bau (Lasakau vs. Bau)**	Lasakau	Bau	Decisive Victory for Lasakau (Bauan bure set on fire, Bauans forced to flee to mainland)	?
Namosi-Dravuni War (Including Battle of Delainavua)	Tui Namosi; Namosi forces	Dravuni; Korolevu	Decisive Victory for Dravuni & Korolevu (Tui Namosi repelled, Son of Kuruduadua killed, Namosi ambushed, Namosi forced to abandon Delainavua and retreat, finally forced back to Namosi)	Considerable losses on both sides initially Son of Kuruduadua killed Large number of Namosi killed
1840 Fiji expedition	Fiji	United States	Defeat	Fiji: 74-104 dead 4 villages destroyed U.S.: 2 Dead
1855 Fiji expedition (October 1855)	Fiji	United States	Defeat	?
Battle of Kaba (1855)	Fiji; Tonga	Rewa Province; Bau	Victory	Fiji: ? Tonga: 21 killed 20 wounded
1858 Fiji expedition (6–16 October 1858)	Fijians	United States	Defeat	14 killed ~36 wounded 115 huts destroyed
Colo Wars (1871)	Kingdom of Fiji	Kai Colo	Victory	≥7 killed

== Colony of Fiji (1874–1970) ==
Conflict	Combatant 1	Combatant 2	Results	Casualties
The Little War (1876)	United Kingdom United Kingdom	Kai Colo	Victory	Unknown
Bougainville Campaign (1943–1944)	United States; Australia; New Zealand; Colony of Fiji	Japan	Victory	USA: 727 dead Australia: 516 dead
Guadalcanal Campaign (1942–1943)	United States; United Kingdom • Solomon Islands • Fiji; Australia; New Zealand; Tonga	Japan	Victory	7,100 dead 7,789+ wounded 4 captured 29 ships lost 615 aircraft lost
Malayan Emergency (1948–1960)	Commonwealth forces: United Kingdom: Federation of Malaya; Southern Rhodesia (until 1953); Rhodesia and Nyasaland (after 1953); Fiji; Australia; New Zealand; Supported by: Thailand (Thai-Malaysian border)	Communist forces: Malayan Communist Party: Malayan National Liberation Army; Supported by: China; Viet Minh (until 1954); North Vietnam (from 1954); Soviet Union; Indonesia	Victory	Killed: 1,346 Malayan troops and police 519 British military personnel Wounded: 2,406 Malayan and British troops/police

== Dominion of Fiji (1970–1987) ==
Conflict	Combatant 1	Combatant 2	Results	Casualties
First 1987 Fijian coup d'état (1987)	Fijian Government	Royal Fiji Military Forces	Military Victory	
Second 1987 Fijian coup d'état (1987)	Royal Fiji Military Forces	Fijian Government	Victory	

== Republic of Fiji (1987–present) ==
Conflict	Combatant 1	Combatant 2	Results	Casualties
Bougainville Civil War (1988–1989)	Bougainville Interim Government (BIG): Bougainville Revolutionary Army (BRA); Supported by: Solomon Islands; Fiji	Papua New Guinea: Buka Liberation Front; Bougainville Resistance Force; Supported by: Australia	*Bougainville Peace Agreement: Establishment of the Autonomous Bougainville Government	1,000–2,000 fighters killed
2000 Fijian coup d'état (2000–2001)	Republic of Fiji: * Military Forces; Police	Hardline i-Taukei Rebels: * Fijian Army Mutineers	Victory	8 killed
2006 Fijian coup d'état (2006)	Republic of Fiji Military Forces	Fijian government	Military Victory: Josefa Iloilo is ousted by the Army; Bainimarama took the presidential power and office	
