= Josefa Celua =

Ratu Josefa Celua
- Prince Joseph Celua of Fiji
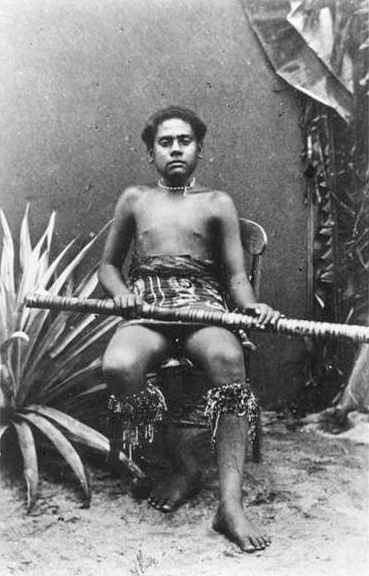
- Born: c.1855 Bau Fiji
- Died: 21 September 1886 (aged 31); Levuka
- Spouse: Adi Mere Kulabui
- Issue: Ratu Popi Seniloli, Vunivalu of Bau
- Father: Ratu Seru Epenisa Cakobau, King of Fiji
- Mother: Adi Litia Samanunu

Ratu Josefa Celua (c. 1855 – 1886) was a Fijian chief from the island of Bau. He was the youngest son of Ratu Seru Epenisa Cakobau (often spelt phonetically as Thakambau), King of Fiji, 6th Vunivalu of Bau, King of Bau, and his first wife, Adi Litia Samanunu, daughter of the Roko Tui Bau. In reporting official occasions he was referred to by Australian newspapers as Prince Joseph Celua of Fiji.

== Birth and family ==
His date of birth is unknown but he was said to be 17 in 1872, and 19 in 1874, suggesting an 1855 birth date although at the time of his death, in 1886, he is said to be 26 which suggests an 1860 birth. Celua had four older siblings and three younger half-siblings from his father's second marriage. His brother one above him, Ratu Timoci Tavanavanua (Timothy) was born in 1847. His father had unified all the tribes of Fiji under his reign in the mid-1800s and subsequently ceded the islands to the United Kingdom in 1874.

== Education in Australia ==
In 1872 Celua came to Australia and was in the care of the Rev Francis Tait until he was enrolled at Newington College under the Presidency of the Rev Joseph Horner Fletcher. Newington had already become a school for students from Fiji as a son, and two grandsons, of Alexander Salmon and the brother, and two nephews, of Queen Marau had been educated there from 1869 until 1871. At the time the college was still at Newington House and Celua arrived with "two native servants and a huge outrigger canoe, which became for the boys a source of great fun" on the Parramatta River. "Almost as much of a sensation [was] the concertina which he played at request at any hour of the night – hymn tunes being his speciality."

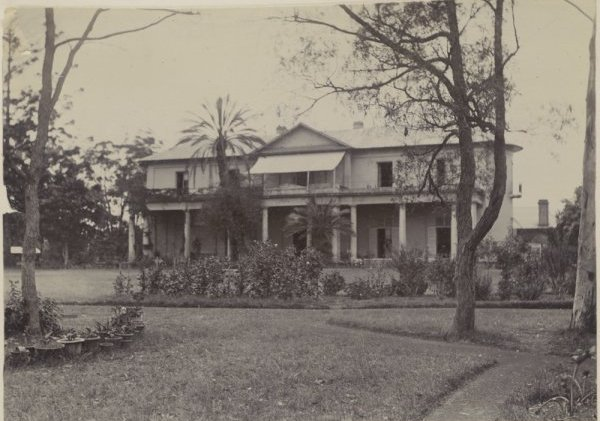
Josefa Celua was educated at Newington House on the Parramatta River, Silverwater.

In the April of his first year in Australia he attended a picnic to farewell Charles St Julian, who had been appointed Chief Justice of Fiji. In responding to a toast, the 17-year-old Celua said in Fijian: "I thank you for so heartily drinking this toast. Speechmaking is a new thing to me, you must therefore please excuse my words being few. I come from a once dark land – a land of cannibal cruelty – but Christianity has raised us from the lowest degradation, and now we are a Christian people. We are now trying to establish law and order in our land, and I ask you to help us. We most earnestly desire the establishment of law, and if you will help us it can be done. We want to govern Fiji in every respect as this land is governed. I have come to white man's land to be trained at Newington College. I am anxious to be taught. You were born in the light, I in the darkness. You were born in a Christian land, I in a heathen country. I wish to be trained here that I may be of service in the government of my own country. Again I thank you for so heartily drinking prosperity to Fiji."

On 30 April 1872 he was a special guest at the opening of the NSW Parliament. At the Queen's Birthday celebrations in Sydney in May 1872, Celua was part of the Newington College Cadet Corps (50 in number) who fired an honour salute. He and the Rev Francis Tait were later presented to the Governor of NSW.

During vacations Celua spent time with the families of his Newington friends. In the winter break of 1873 he was in the Maitland, New South Wales, district when he helped to save a ten-year-old boy from drowning in the Hunter River.

Celua left Australia on 20 December 1873 for Fiji on board a ship bound for San Francisco. The Empire newspaper article of the time only mentions one passenger in steerage so it is unsure what became of his second servant. Given the claims of Antonius Tui Tonga (1850–1905) to be the son of the King of Fiji and to have been educated at Newington it is likely that he was Celua's second servant and on staying in Australia he migrated to Mackay, Queensland.

Celua's education in Australia, appears to have had a marked influence on his life. In Cannibals & convicts: notes of personal experiences in the Western Pacific by Julian Thomas, the author describes him as being "a striking example of the success of the pious training of the Wesleyans at Newington College, in Sydney."

== Cession of Fiji to the British Crown ==
Celua was actively involved in the meetings in Fiji and in Sydney for the formal cession of Fiji to the British Crown. He was by his father's side when Sir Hercules Robinson visited Levuka and when as Ex-King he visited Sydney. It was said by the Melbourne newspaper The Argus that "Joseph is a good looking lad of 19, who dresses in European clothes, and looks well in them. He spent 18 months in Newington College, Sydney, where he learned to speak and read and write English. This young scion of the house of Cakobau does not appear to have any ambition beyond that of getting through life comfortably ... Joe however, has very agreeable manners and he has one special good quality – he is strictly temperate as regards intoxicating liquors."

== Marriage and later life ==
Celua married Adi Mere Kulabui in 1879 and had a son, Epeli Popi Seniloli.

In the book Cruise of the Alert – Four Years in Patagonian, Polynesian, and Mascarene Waters (1878–82), Dr R. W. Coppinger speaks of his visit to Levuka and meeting Celua. The author describes him as "a fine-looking man, twenty-three years old ... He surprised us all by speaking exceedingly good English, and possessing an intimate knowledge of the ways and manners of civilized life ... There was no topic of general interest on which he did not possess a fair amount of knowledge. He wore his hair in the fashion of the country, i.e., in a mop frizzled out to an immense size, and in other respects he was got up as a native chief of distinction. He spoke favourably of British rule, although, as we were otherwise informed, he himself had recently acquired a practical experience of the unpleasant consequences attending the commission of an indictable offence, in having to undergo a sentence of three months' hard labour." This book talks about Celua spending three years at University after returning to Sydney with his father in 1874 but no other reference to his tertiary education can be found.

Little more is known of his life until he died in Fiji. The Cootamundra Herald carried the following notice on 27 October 1886: "Ratu Joe, son of the late King Thakambau, of Fiji, and a student of Newington College, has died of leprosy at Levuka, aged 26 years." The Sydney Mail and New South Wales Advertiser reports him as dying on 21 September 1886. He is more likely to have been 31 and was survived by his wife and young son who went on to hold the regnal title of Vunivalu of Bau from 1914 until 1936.

Celua did not know his grandson, Ratu Sir George Kadavulevu Cakobau, GCMG, GCVO, OBE, Governor General of Fiji from 1973 to 1983, although George and a great-grandson, Ratu Josefa Celua Cakobau (born 1965), also both attended Newington College, in the 1930s and 1980s respectively, making three generations of the family Old Newingtonians.
