= Premier of the Kingdom of Viti =

Head of the government of Kingdom of Viti

In 1871, Ratu Seru Epenisa Cakobau, the Vunivalu (Warlord/Paramount Chief) of Bau, succeeded in unifying the previously warring tribes throughout the Fiji Islands by establishing the Kingdom of Viti, with the support of foreigners. Cakobau proceeded to set up a constitutional monarchy, in which both the legislature and the executive were dominated by foreigners.

== List of premiers of Viti (1871–1874) ==
Following is a list of people who have served as premier of Viti.

| No. | Portrait | Name (Birth–Death) | Term of office | | Monarch |
| No. | Portrait | Name (Birth–Death) | Took office | Left office | Monarch |
|---|---|---|---|---|---|
Kingdom of Viti
| 1 | Sydney C. Burt (1826–1892) | | 5 June 1871 | 18 May 1872 | Cakobau |
| 2 | George Austin Woods (1828–1905) | | 18 May 1872 | 23 March 1874 | Cakobau |
| — | John Bates Thurston (1836–1897); Acting Premier | | 23 March 1874 | 10 October 1874 | Cakobau |

All existing government institutions were dissolved when Fiji became a British crown colony on 10 October 1874.

== See also ==
- Prime Minister of Fiji
