= Coat of arms of Fiji =

Versions
- Escutcheon
- Armiger: Republic of Fiji
- Adopted: 4 July 1908
- Crest: A Fijian Canoe with outrigger in full sail proper
- Torse: Of the colours
- Shield: Argent, a Cross Gules, between in the first quarter three Sugar canes couped, in the second, a Coconut palm also couped, in the third a Dove volant holding in the beak a branch of Olive, and in the fourth a bunch of Banana fruits slipped, all proper, on a chief Gules, a Lion passant guardant, holding between the forepaws a Cocoa pod proper.
- Supporters: Dexter, a Fijian native affronty, round his waist a Tupu Sulu, holding in the exterior hand a barbed spear all proper, sinister alike native in profile holding in the exterior hand a pineapple club in bend sinister
- Motto: Rerevaka na Kalou ka doka na Tui "Fear God and honour the King (1 Peter 2:17)"
- Earlier version(s): Kingdom of Fiji
- Use: 1871-1874

The coat of arms of Fiji is the heraldic device consisting of a shield divided quarterly by Cross of St. George and charged with a gold lion at the top, supported by two Fijian warriors, one on each side, and topped with a canoe as the crest. Adopted in 1908 by a Royal Warrant, it has been the coat of arms of Fiji since that year, having been retained after independence in 1970. The escutcheon from the arms is featured on the flag of Fiji.

== History ==
The Kingdom of Fiji became a crown colony of the British Empire on 10 October 1874. About 34 years later, the islands were accorded with their own coat of arms through a royal warrant issued on 4 July 1908. Although its design was "intended to be British", the arms did incorporate symbols of Fiji – it was eventually used on the flag of the territory. When it was granted independence on 10 October 1970, Fiji decided to retain its coat of arms from the colonial era. This was partly because of its links to Seru Epenisa Cakobau, the first and last King of Fiji (Fijian: Tui Viti) who relinquished control of the country to Britain. However, the coat of arms featured on the flag was modified, which involved removing the crest, supporters, and motto, thus leaving only the escutcheon untouched. This was done in order to enlarge the shield and make it more prominent. This has led to calls from several Fijian chiefs for the restoration of the full, official coat of arms to the national flag.

== Design ==
=== Symbolism ===
The colors and objects on the coat of arms carry cultural, political, and regional meanings. The Cross of St. George—which divides the shield quarterly—and the golden lion at the top represent the United Kingdom, the former colonial power that ruled over Fiji. The cacao pod held in the lion's paw, along with the sugarcane, coconut palm and bananas occupying three of the four quadrants, represent the country's natural resources, since these are key agricultural crops in Fiji. The bottom left quadrant contains a dove that symbolizes peace – this was utilized on the country's flag during the reign of King Cakobau, whose government was the last before the commencement of British rule.

The crest at the top depicts a takia—a traditional Fijian canoe—while the supporters grasping the shield on both sides are Fijian warriors. According to legend, they are twins; the older brother is clutching a spear, while the younger one holds a totokia club. At the bottom is the country's motto: Fear God and honour the King (Fijian: Rerevaka na kalou ka doka na Tui).

== See also ==
- Flag of Fiji
