= List of wars involving Tonga =

This is a list of wars involving Tonga.

Conflict	Combatant 1	Combatant 2	Results	Casualties
Civil war(15th century–1470)	Tonga		Result of Civil conflict / status quo ante bellum: The Tongans were driven out of Wallis and Futuna.; Tuʻi Tonga Kauʻulufonua I ceded temporal authority to his brother Moʻungāmotuʻa, replacing the Tuʻi Tonga dynasty with the Tu'i Ha'atakalaua dynasty.	Unknown
Civil war(17th century)	Tonga		Result of Civil conflict / status quo ante bellum: Mataelehaʻamea, the Tu'i Kanokupolu, established the supremacy of his dynasty after a war against the Tuʻi Haʻatakalaua, Vaea.	Unknown
Civil war(1799–1852)	Tonga		Result of Civil conflict / status quo ante bellum	Unknown
Battle of Kaba (1855)	Fiji; Tonga	Rewa Province; Bau	Victory	21 killed 20 wounded
World War II (1942–1945): Guadalcanal Campaign (1942–1943); Solomon Islands campaign (1942–1945)	United States; United Kingdom • Solomon Islands • Fiji; Australia; New Zealand; Tonga	Japan	Victory	7,100 dead 7,789+ wounded 4 captured 29 ships lost 615 aircraft lost
World War II (1942–1945): Guadalcanal Campaign (1942–1943); Solomon Islands campaign (1942–1945)	United States; United Kingdom • Fiji • Solomon Islands; Australia; New Zealand; Tonga	Japan	Victory	10,600 killed 40+ ships sunk, 800 aircraft destroyed
War in Afghanistan (2001–2021)	Afghanistan; United States; United Kingdom; Germany; Italy; France; Canada; Australia; New Zealand; Georgia; Poland; Romania; Turkey; Albania; Armenia; Austria; Azerbaijan; Bahrain; Belgium; Bosnia and Herzegovina; Bulgaria; Croatia; Czech Republic; Denmark; El Salvador; Estonia; Finland; Greece; Hungary; Iceland; Ireland; Jordan; Latvia; Lithuania; Luxembourg; Malaysia; Mongolia; Montenegro; Netherlands; Norway; Portugal; Republic of Macedonia; Singapore; Slovakia; Slovenia; South Korea; Spain; Sweden; Switzerland; Tonga; Ukraine; United Arab Emirates	Northern Alliance; Taliban al-Qaeda; Islamic Movement of Uzbekistan; HI-Gulbuddin; Hezb-e Islami Khalis; Haqqani network Lashkar-e-Taiba; Jaish-e-Mohammed; East Turkestan Islamic Movement; Tehrik-i-Taliban Pakistan; Islamic Emirate of Waziristan; Tehreek-e-Nafaz-e-Shariat-e-Mohammadi; Islamic Jihad Union Islamic Emirate of Afghanistan	Defeat: Fall of the Taliban government in Afghanistan; Destruction of al-Qaeda camps; Over two thirds of al-Qaeda's leadership demolished; Occupation of Afghanistan; Establishment of a new Afghan government; Killing of Osama bin Laden; Resurgence of Taliban; Withdrawal of allied forces	Unknown
Iraq War (2004–2008)	Invasion phase (2003) United States; United Kingdom; Australia; Poland; Peshmerga Supported by: ItalyNetherlands Post-invasion (2003–11); United States; United Kingdom MNF–I (2003–09): United States (2003–09); United Kingdom (2003–09); Australia (2003–-09); Romania (2003–09); Azerbaijan (2003–08); Kuwait (2003–08); Estonia (2003–09); El Salvador (2003–09); Bulgaria (2003–08); Moldova (2003–08); Albania (2003–08); Ukraine (2003–08); Denmark (2003–08); Czech Republic (2003–08); South Korea (2003–08); Singapore (2003–08); Croatia (2003-08); Bosnia and Herzegovina (2003–08); Macedonia (2003–08); Latvia (2003–08); Poland (2003–08); Kazakhstan (2003–08); Mongolia (2003–08); Georgia (2003–08); Tonga (2004–08); Japan (2004–08); Armenia (2005–08); Slovakia (2003–07); Lithuania (2003–07); Italy (2003–06); Norway (2003–06); Hungary (2003–05); Netherlands (2003–05); Portugal (2003–05); New Zealand (2003–04); Thailand (2003–04); Philippines (2003–04); Honduras (2003–04); Dominican Republic (2003–04); Spain (2003–04); Nicaragua (2003–04); Iceland (2003–unknown); New Iraqi government: Iraqi Armed Forces; Awakening Council; Supported by: Iran; Iraqi Kurdistan: Peshmerga	Invasion phase (2003); Ba'athist Iraq Post-invasion (2003–11); Ba'ath loyalists: Supreme Command for Jihad and Liberation; Army of the Men of the Naqshbandi Order; Sunni insurgents: Al-Qaeda in Iraq (2004–06); Islamic State of Iraq (from 2006); Islamic Army of Iraq; Ansar al-Sunnah (2003–07); Shia insurgents: Mahdi Army; Special Groups; Asa'ib Ahl al-Haq; Others; supported by: Iran: Quds Force	Victory	Iraqi Security Forces (post-Saddam) Killed: 17,690 Wounded: 40,000+ Coalition forces Killed: 4,815 (4,497 U.S., 179 UK, 139 other) Missing/captured (U.S.): 17 (8 rescued, 9 died in captivity) Wounded: 32,776+ (32,249 U.S., 315 UK, 212+ other)Injured/diseases/other medical*: 51,139 (47,541 U.S., 3,598 UK) Contractor Killed: 1,554 Wounded & injured: 43,880 Awakening Councils Killed: 1,002+ Wounded: 500+ (2007), 828 (2008) Total dead: 25,285 (+12,000 policemen killed 2003–2005)"" Total wounded: 117,961 Iraqi combatant dead (invasion period): 7,600–10,800 Insurgents (post-Saddam) Killed: 26,544 (2003–11) Detainees: 12,000 (Iraqi-held) Total dead: 34,144–3
