= James Herman De Ricci =

Politician

The Honourable James Herman De Ricci

4th Attorney General of Fiji
- In office 1875–1876
- Monarch: Seru Epenisa Cakobau
- Governor: Sir Hercules Robinson; Sir Arthur Hamilton-Gordon
- Preceded by: Sydney Burt
- Succeeded by: Joseph Garrick

Personal details
- Born: 15 March 1847
- Died: 1900 (aged 52–53)
- Spouse: Hélène Levi Montefiore
- Children: 1 daughter, 1 son
- Profession: Lawyer, Author

James Herman De Ricci (15 March 1847 – 1900) was Attorney General of Fiji from 1875 to 1876. He is remembered, among other things, as the author of Fiji (Our New Province in the South Seas).

The son of Herman Robert De Ricci, he was married to Hélène Levi Montefiore, daughter of Edouard Levi Montefiore and Emma Cahen d'Anvers. They had a son, Seymour Montefiore Roberto Rosso, and a daughter, Alice.

Legal offices
Preceded by Sydney Burt	Attorney-General of Fiji; 1875-1876	Succeeded by Joseph Garrick
