= Colo Wars =

Conflict against the British in Fiji

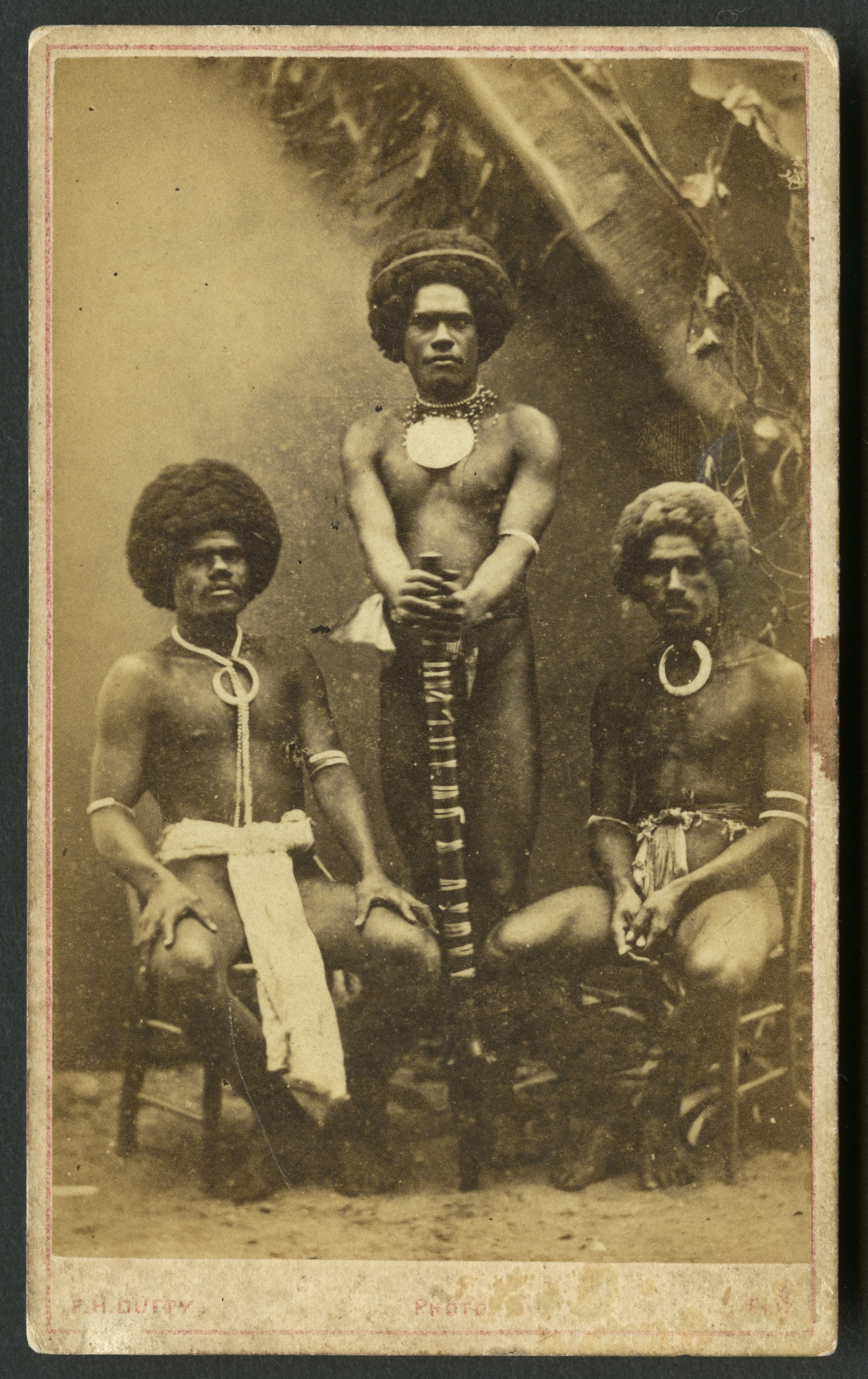
- Three Kai Colo men in 1873
Date	1871–1873, 1876
Location	Highlands of Viti Levu, Fiji
Result	Fijian and British victory

Belligerents
Kingdom of Fiji (United Kingdom) British Empire	Kai Colo people

Commanders and leaders
The Little War: (United Kingdom) Arthur Hamilton Gordon (United Kingdom) Louis Knollys; Ratu Luke Nakulanikoro	The Little War: Mudu, chief of Naicobocobo; Nabisiki, chief of Driodrio

Strength
The Little War: 2,000 soldiers, mostly natives	The Little War: ≥1,200

The Colo Wars (Colo pronounced /ˈθoʊloʊ/) were a pair of wars fought in the interior of the Kingdom of Fiji and later Colonial Fiji between authorities and the Kai Colo (Note: Colo refers to the "wild" highlands of Viti Levu, and the term Kai Colo means hillmen, referring to the inhabitants of the highland region of central Viti Levu, rather than any specific tribe. Today the term is used in Fiji to mean something like hillbilly.) in the 1870s. The violence occurred in two waves: one comprised a punitive expedition and related violence in 1871 and 1873 against the Kai Colo for murdering two planters, and the second in 1876 comprised a war called the Little War or The Church War (Fijian: Na Valu ni Lotu) fought in response to growing British control of the Viti Levu interior.

== Violence in 1871 ==
=== Background ===
By 1870, Fiji had been mostly taken over by the Bauans. The King of Fiji, Cakobau, paid off parts of his mounting debt to the United States with land, parts of which he did not control. When planters moved into the land, they increasingly moved inland towards the highlands, creating contact and distrust between the Kai Colo and outsiders. Another source of conflict was the Kai Colo opposition to Christian missionaries, primarily Methodists. One such missionary, Thomas Baker, had been killed in 1867 along with his Fijian students in the highlands of Fiji. The Kai Colo's grievances with missionaries were caused in part by their desire to change many aspects of their culture, such as their religious connection to their hair, which they believed was the source of their mana, as well as their association of Christianity with the territorial ambitions of the enemy Bauans.

=== Ba Campaign ===
In 1871, two planters named Spiers and Mackintosh were killed in Ba Province while duck hunting by a man in the highlands belonging to the Vatusila tribe. A punitive expedition formed by settlers could not find the perpetrators, so they burned the village of Cubu and went home. There was a tense peace for a year, with Vanuatuan and Solomonese laborers made to guard the plantations of the Ba River until forces under the Kingdom of Fiji under the command of a British officer reinforced the area and ordered the planters not to arm themselves against a Kai Colo attack, and that only the crown could legally protect them. Shortly after, the Kai Colo attacked a plantation at Vunisamaloa, killing 18 workers. The planters gathered a force, supported by the British Subject’s Mutual Protection Society (BSMPS), which had formerly called itself the Ku Klux Klan, and were asked by Fijian authorities to stand down, but they could not convince the 150 armed settlers and their workers to stand down until the HMS Dido arrived to convince the settlers to abandon their planned attack and hand over the BSMPS agitators for deportation.

Settlers and British forces joined forces to prosecute the Ba Campaign, and killed 50 Kai Colos and burnt Karawa, and the Kai Colo killed 7 British soldiers. Among the Kai Colo dead were some of the men involved in the killing of Spiers and Macintosh. Native forces on both sides cannibalized fallen enemies after the battle. Kai Colo forces were chased further inland and isolated into a cave, out of which they reportedly escaped by bribing the native auxiliaries at the cave exits. One Major Thurston began a concomitant offensive, taking Magodro, Bulu, and Nawaicavu with a force of hundreds, many of whom were volunteers of Kai Colo origin, belonging to the Naqaqga tribe, who were enemies of the Vatusila tribe. He fought the Kai Colo at Nacule and was victorious there, but a third of the native volunteers died in the fighting. The victorious survivors cannibalized some of the fallen Kai Colo. The Kai Colo began to surrender to British forces, with a final surprise attack on the well-fortified village of Nubutautau capturing it and ending the war. Some captured Kai Colo chiefs were hanged and others took up work on plantations. This war served to weaken the overall capabilities of the Kai Colo in the later Little War of 1876.

== The Little War ==
=== Background ===
In October 1874, the British Empire was given sovereignty over Fiji, which had previously been partially united by the Bauans. In the period of the Kingdom of Fiji, a notion of Fijian nationality began to emerge among some chiefs, although Fiji's growing unity and eventual British dominion had all occurred without the consent of the interior districts of Viti Levu, especially in the western part of the island. To avoid a war in the style of the New Zealand Wars, a meeting was convened between interior chiefs and administrator Edgar Leopold Layard. He met with 69 of them, and they agreed to accept British rule on the conditions of retaining their lands and religion, polygamy, and to not be forced into Christian education. However, the meeting also caused the propagation of a measles epidemic which ravaged the interior, killing a fourth or fifth of the population and most of the chiefs, along with their agreement with Imperial authorities. This precipitated a breakdown in relations, with the Kai Colo interpreting the epidemic as a sign of divine punishment, and coastal Methodist Fijians of the Nadroga region inciting violence against the non-Christian Kai Colo.

The Kai Colo gradually began to increase their organization, and the Legislative Council of Fiji adopted the Peace and Good Order Ordinance in September 1875 to end the incitements to violence in the Sigatoka region on pain of deportation, although this failed. The Kai Colo strategically stored food, muskets, and ammunition in caves across the highlands. Kalou rere rituals were performed to make fighters invulnerable. The chiefs also agreed not to be the ones to start the fighting. In order to control the highlands, British administrators decided to arrange to create a police station inside Kai Colo territory at Nasaucoko, to prevent a war. The Kai Colo surrounded this garrison and the chiefs began negotiations regarding it.

=== War ===
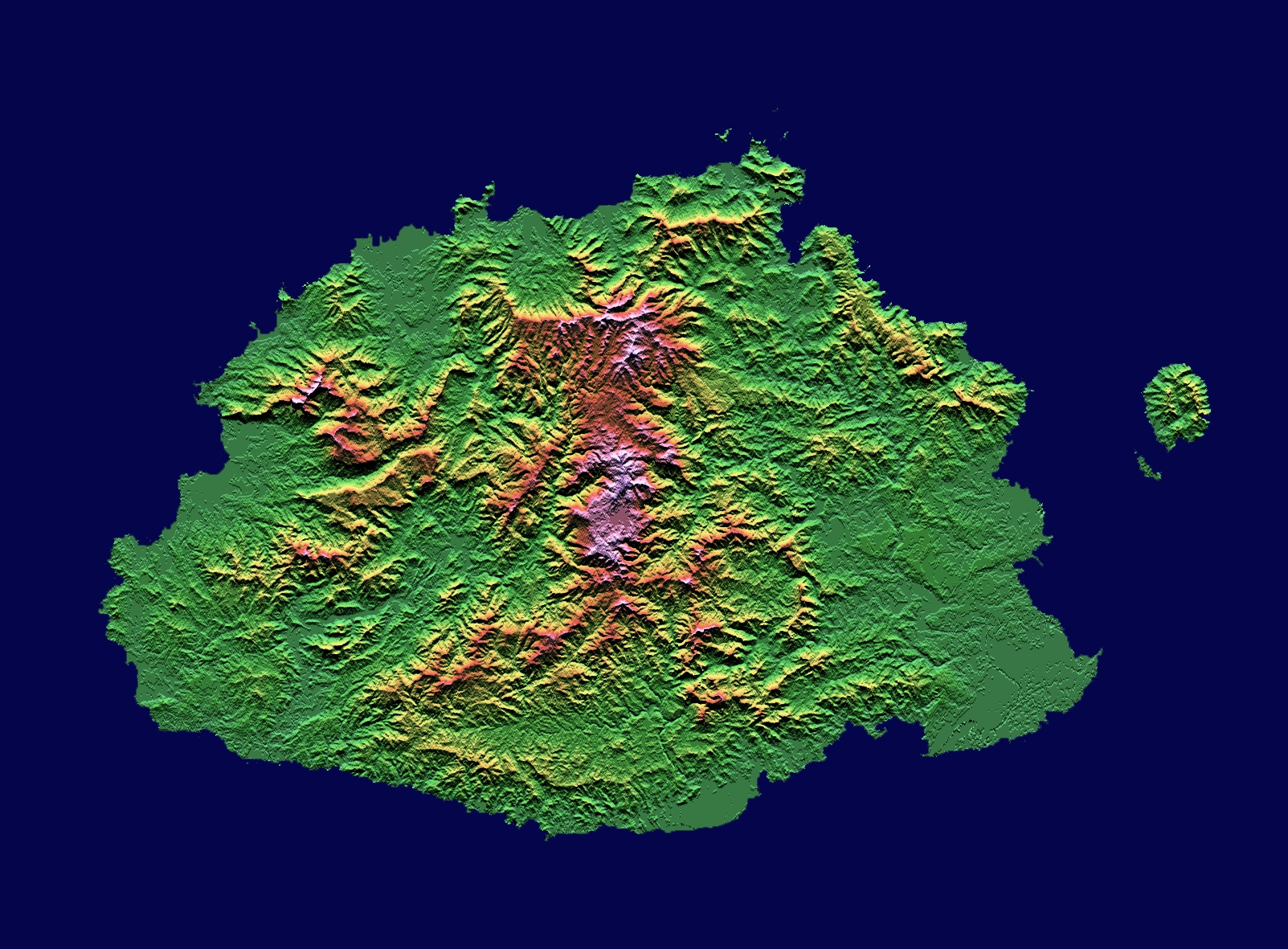
The Little War took place on the west (in this topographic map, the left) side of Viti Levu's highlands.

On 12 April 1876, fighters, dissatisfied with constant negotiation with the British, broke with their chiefs and attacked eight Christian villages in the Nadroga region. Governor Sir Arthur Hamilton Gordon declined to send in British Regulars or Sepoys and resolved to rely on the Fijian Armed Native Constabulary (ANC) to put down the Kai Colo. He also decided against merely sending a punitive expedition and sought to put the Kai Colo down in a proper war. The rebelling tribes were located in West Colo, the western half of the highlands. He planned for a force of 1,000, but the chiefs of Fiji contributed 2,000. On the 17th, Kai Colo fighters moved against the east bank of the Sigatoka River and north of Nadroga, burning Christian villages and killing five women and children. Between six to 20 men died defending the villages and five Kai Colo were killed. The strategy of the Kai Colo was to fight a guerrilla war across a wide front, and their tactic of burning towns rather than massacring inhabitants reflected the Fijian custom. Governor Gordon anticipated the same strategy to be used in reverse by British forces. He warned his officers, "I know you are fully aware of my abhorence [sic] of emptying the country by destruction of the towns. ... you will have to give me a very Strict account of every village burning.”

At the outset of the war, Kai Colo were fought against by Christian Fijian tribes, like paramount chief (Kalevu) Luke Nakulanikoro of Nadroga, who seized and burnt several villages beginning on 18 April. Allied forces put Tatuba and Wala to siege on 24 April and eventually burnt them too. Governor Gordon dispatched his nephew Arthur J. Gordon to oversee the operations of Luke Nakulanikoro, but he only exercised nominal control over the chief. Meanwhile, the colonial garrison at Nasaucoko dispatched raids across the highlands to replenish their exhausted food stores. Ratu Luke had taken control of more than 1,000 soldiers and was rushed along to do an offensive because of limited food availability. His offensive burnt the villages of Bukutia and Koroivatuma and forced the Kai Colo into the subterranean fortress at Matanavatu, which was seen as impregnable. However, on 24 June, Ratu Luke's forces made their way into the caves, killing 38 and accepted the surrender of 1,200 Kai Colos, including many chiefs and a principal leader, Mundu.

In the north, Louis Knollys commanded 500 men. He found that most of the Kai Colo had already fled to the caves. He accepted the surrender of the Naqaqga tribe at Lobo ni Koro cave, despite having himself run out of ammunition. The final chief to surrender, Nasaqanivere, laid down his arms at the end of July.

=== Aftermath ===
Governor Gordon tried 70 Kai Colo men for crimes and executed 6. Nabisiki was also shot later, but for allegedly trying to escape. Fifty more warriors were tried, and twelve were executed. 120 were sentenced to hard labor and put in labor camps. Some non-combatants were allowed to return to rebuild their villages, but many areas in the highlands were ordered by Gordon to remain depopulated and in ruins. Gordon also constructed a military fortress, Fort Canarvon, at the headwaters of the Sigatoka River where a large contingent of soldiers were based to maintain British control. He renamed the Native Regiment, the Armed Native Constabulary to lessen its appearance of being a military force.

The highlands of western Viti Levu remained unchristianized as late as 1890, and the Tuka Movement of resistance took root in Fiji not long after the war.
