= Nukulau =

Island in Fiji

Coordinates: 18°10′S 178°31′E

- Location within Fiji

Geography
- Location: South Pacific Ocean
- Archipelago: Viti Levu Group

Administration
- Fiji
- Division: Central Division
- Province: Rewa
- District: Rewa

Demographics
- Population: 0

Nukulau Island is a small islet belonging to Fiji. It is close to Suva, Fiji's capital, which lies about ten kilometers to the west. It is an island rich in history, which has played a pivotal role in Fiji's demographic and political development over the past 160 years.

== History ==
Nukulau played a role in the ceding of Fiji to the British Crown in 1874. In 1846, John Brown Williams, the American consul, had purchased the island for a mere thirty dollars. He subsequently lived there, in the wooden two-story house he built, until 1849. On 4 July of that year, during American Independence Day celebrations, a store belonging to Williams was destroyed in a fire which started from a cannon burst, and his belongings that he had salvaged from the fire were subsequently looted by Fiji natives. A second fire in 1855 destroyed Williams' house. Williams held Cakobau, the Vunivalu (Paramount Chief) of Bau and self-proclaimed Tui Viti (King of Fiji) responsible for the looting, and, supported by the United States Navy in the 1855 Fiji expedition, demanded US$43,531 in compensation, to cover Williams' losses, valued at US$5000, and claims by other settlers. This was followed up by an 1858 Fiji expedition, in which hostages were seized. Cakobau's inability to pay the debt, coupled with fear of a U.S. invasion and annexation, led to a series of negotiations with the United Kingdom. After a failed attempt to establish a stable constitutional monarchy under the effective tutelage of the Australian Polynesia Company, the negotiations culminated in a decision to cede the islands to the United Kingdom in 1874, ushering in almost a century of British rule.

Historians now believe that the U.S. compensation claim was greatly exaggerated and largely fabricated (see Robson, A.E, Prelude to Empire, 2004, p. 84 (citing Calvert 1856 and Freemantle 1856)).

The colourful history of Nukulau Island did not end with the advent of British rule. From 1879 to 1916, the island served as a quarantine centre for thousands of Indian indentured labourers brought in by the British colonial rulers. After health checks, they were subsequently employed on Fiji's sugar plantations, or else repatriated to the Indian subcontinent.

The first human being born on Nukulau Island was Hamidan Bibi Khan, 18 October 1946. She migrated to England in the 1960s and died 8 February 2025.

== Nukulau prison ==
In 2000, a prison was opened on Nukulau, to house George Speight and other perpetrators of the 2000 coup that deposed Prime Minister Mahendra Chaudhry's government. On 18 December 2006, Fiji's military ruler, Commodore Frank Bainimarama, announced that the prison would be closed and its inmates transferred to other prisons. The land would be returned to a public park, as it was before 2000. The prison was closed on 20 December and its occupants moved to jails on the Viti Levu mainland.

On December 26, the first people were able to visit the island. Visitors are charged a fee of $2 per person to help with the upkeep of the island. Barbecues are available and camping is possible - a permit must first be obtained.

== Transport to Nukulau Island ==
Boat fares are usually $15/return for adults and half price for children.

== Facilities on the Island ==
There is a shed on the island but visitors can also bring their tents to camp out. For the shed, they need to take their own sleeping items. Bathroom and toilet facilities are available on the island but visitors are advised to bring their own drinking water, whether they are on the island for a day trip or overnight stay. There are about nine BBQ stands and the hotplate is always with the island caretaker. Lovo facilities are also available but you will need to provide the hands and some firewood.
