= Attorney General Garrick =

Attorney General Garrick may refer to:

- James Francis Garrick (1836–1907), Attorney General of Queensland
- Joseph Garrick (1846–1908), Attorney General of Fiji
