= Joseph Garrick =

Australian lawyer and judge

The Honourable Joseph Hector Garrick

5th Attorney General of Fiji
- In office 25 November 1876 – 1882
- Monarch: Victoria
- Governor: Sir Arthur Hamilton-Gordon; Sir William Des Vœux
- Preceded by: James Herman De Ricci
- Succeeded by: Fielding Clarke

Personal details
- Born: 8 December 1846 Sydney, New South Wales, Australia
- Died: 23 February 1908 (aged 61)
- Spouse(s): Emily Constance Agnew; 1868 — 1880 (divorced); Emma Elizabeth Milne m. 1881
- Relations: James Francis Garrick — brother Francis James Garrick —brother
- Children: 2 sons, 2 daughters
- Profession: Lawyer

Joseph Hector Garrick (Sydney, New South Wales, 8 December 1846 — 23 February 1908), was an Australian lawyer who served as a judge on the benches of the Kingdom of Viti, the first Fijian nation-state. Having arrived in 1873, Garrick was associated with the events leading up to the cession of the islands to the United Kingdom in 1874.

Following cession, Garrick was appointed Chief Police Magistrate and Registrar General on 1 September 1875. He went on to serve as Attorney General of Fiji from 25 November 1876 to 1882.

After retiring from government service, he continued to practice Law privately in Levuka, and was still doing so as of 1889.

== Personal life ==
Garrick was born in Sydney to James Francis Garrick and his wife Catherine Eliza Branson, both formerly of London. He was a younger brother to the New Zealand politician Francis James Garrick and the Queensland politician James Francis Garrick.

Garrick married Emily Constance Agnew in Sydney, in 1868. They had two children, Hector and Constance, but the marriage ended in divorce. On 22 July 1880, Garrick was co-respondent in a divorce suit initiated by barrister William Scott, who accused Garrick of having committed adultery with his wife, Emma Elizabeth Scott, née Milne. The court granted Scott's suit and £1000 damages. Garrick subsequently remarried to Milne in Sydney 1881; he had two more children with her — Godfrey Ernest and Gladys Neville.

Garrick died 23 February 1908.

Legal offices
Preceded by James Herman De Ricci	Attorney General of Fiji; 1876–1882	Succeeded by Sir Fielding Clarke
