= Kingdom of Fiji =

1871–1874 monarchy in Fiji

Kingdom of Fiji Matanitu o Viti
- 1871–1874
- Flag Coat of arms
- Motto: "Rerevaka na Kalou ka Doka na Tui" "Fear God and honour the King"
- Capital: Levuka
- Common languages: Fijian
- Government: Semi-constitutional monarchy
- Monarch
  - 1871–1874: Ratu Seru Epenisa Cakobau
- Attorney-General
  - 1872: Robert Wilson Hamilton
  - 1872–1873: Charles Rossiter Forwood
  - 1873–1874: Sydney Charles Burt
- Chief Secretary
  - 1871–1872: Sydney Charles Burt
  - 1872–1874: George Austin Woods
  - 1874: John Bates Thurston (acting)
- History
  - Established: 5 June 1871
  - Annexed by the United Kingdom: 10 October 1874
- Currency: Fijian pound
Preceded by	Succeeded by
Ancient Fiji	Colony of Fiji
- Today part of: Fiji

The Kingdom of Fiji (Fijian: Matanitu o Viti), also known as the Kingdom of Viti, was a short-lived monarchy in Fiji. It existed from 1871 to 1874, with Ratu Seru Epenisa Cakobau as King.

== History ==
The Kingdom of Fiji was the first unified Fijian state, and it covered all of modern Fiji, except the island of Rotuma. Cakobau was the Vunivalu (Warlord or Paramount Chief) of the island of Bau. His father, Tanoa Visawaqa, had conquered the Burebasaga Confederacy but never subdued western Fiji. Cakobau controlled most of the eastern parts of the Fijian Islands and declared himself King of Fiji (Tui Viti). This met with opposition from other chiefs, who regarded him as at best first among equals. However, in June 1871, John Bates Thurston, the British honorary consul, persuaded the Fijian chiefs to accept a constitutional monarchy with Cakobau as the King, but with real power in the hands of a cabinet and legislature dominated by Australian settlers. The Legislative Assembly met for the first time in Levuka in November 1871.

Within months, government overspending had led to the accumulation of unmanageable debt. In 1872, following continuing economic and social unrest, Thurston approached the British government, at Cakobau's request, with an offer to cede the islands. Two British commissioners were sent to Fiji to investigate the possibility of an annexation. The question was complicated by maneuverings for power between Cakobau and his old rival, Maʻafu, with both men vacillating for many months. On 21 March 1874, Cakobau made a final offer, which the British accepted. On 23 September, Sir Hercules Robinson, soon to be appointed the British Governor, arrived on HMS Dido and received Cakobau with a royal 21-gun salute. After some vacillation, Cakobau agreed to renounce his Tui Viti title. On 10 October 1874, Cakobau, Ma'afu, and a group of some senior chiefs of Fiji signed two copies of a Deed of Cession establishing the Colony of Fiji, which lasted for almost a century – until 10 October 1970, when the Dominion of Fiji became a fully independent Commonwealth realm with Queen Elizabeth II as Queen of Fiji.

== See also ==
- Fiji during the time of Cakobau — earlier 19th century
- Monarchy of Fiji
