= John Bates Thurston =

British colonial official (1836-1897)

Sir John Bates Thurston KCMG FRGS
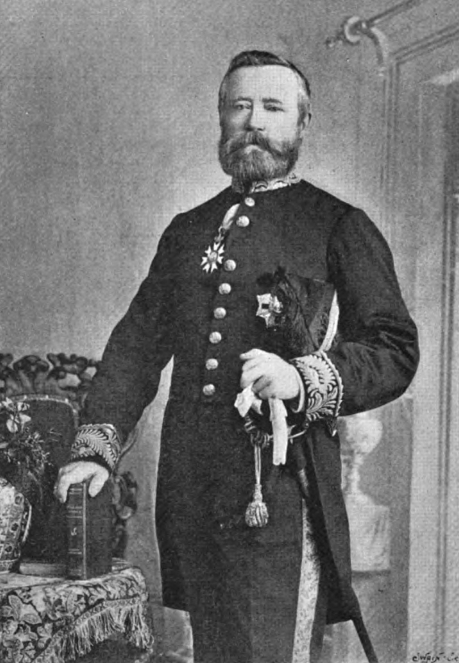

Acting Premier of the Kingdom of Viti
- In office 23 March 1874 – 10 October 1874
- Monarch: Seru Epenisa Cakobau
- Preceded by: George Austin Woods
- Succeeded by: none (position abolished)

Acting High Commissioner for the Western Pacific
- In office 21 January 1885 – 1 January 1887
- Monarch: Victoria
- Preceded by: Sir William Des Vœux
- Succeeded by: Sir Charles Mitchell

Acting Governor of Fiji
- In office 21 January 1885 – 1 January 1887
- Monarch: Victoria
- Preceded by: Sir William Des Vœux
- Succeeded by: Sir Charles Mitchell

4th High Commissioner for the Western Pacific
- In office 1888–1897
- Monarch: Victoria
- Preceded by: Sir Charles Mitchell
- Succeeded by: Sir George O'Brien

5th Governor of Fiji
- In office 1888–1897
- Monarch: Victoria
- Preceded by: Sir Charles Mitchell
- Succeeded by: Sir George O'Brien

Personal details
- Born: 31 January 1836 London, United Kingdom
- Died: 7 February 1897 (aged 61) Suva, Fiji
- Resting place: Melbourne General Cemetery
- Citizenship: British
- Spouse(s): Madame Marie de Lavalatte c.1866 – 14 December 1881; Amelia Berry; 14 January 1883 – 7 February 1897 (his death)
- Children: 3 sons, 2 daughters

Sir John Bates Thurston KCMG FRGS (31 January 1836 – 7 February 1897) was a British colonial official who served Fiji in a variety of capacities, including Premier of the Kingdom of Viti (before the islands were ceded to the United Kingdom) and later as colonial Governor.

== Early life ==
Thurston was born on 31 January 1836 in London, England, where he received an elementary education before pursuing a nautical career in 1850. In 1855 he became the first officer, but shortly afterwards was struck down by cholera and was sent to Australia to recover. He became a sheep farmer with a friend, but in 1862 the farm was destroyed by a flood. In 1864, he joined a botany expedition to the South Sea Islands and was wrecked off the coast of Samoa, where he was stranded for eighteen months, before being rescued and brought to Fiji.

== Political life in Fiji ==
Shortly after his arrival in Fiji, he was employed by the British Consulate. In 1869 he became acting Consul for Fiji and Tonga.

In June 1871, Thurston, then Britain's honorary consul, forged a "marriage of convenience" between the Bauan chief Seru Epenisa Cakobau and the British settlers. He persuaded the Fijian chiefs to surrender the independence of their fiefdoms and accept a constitutional monarchy with Cakobau as acclaimed King, but with real power in the hands of a cabinet and legislature dominated by settlers. The arrangement was not particularly successful. Within months, government overspending had led to the accumulation of an unmanageable debt which led to economic and social unrest.

In 1872, Thurston approached the British government, at Cakobau's request, with an offer to cede the islands to the United Kingdom. (A previous offer almost two decades earlier had been turned down). The British were much more inclined to annexe Fiji now than they had been previously. The murder of Bishop John Patteson of the Melanesian Mission at Nukapu in the Reef Islands had provoked public outrage, which was compounded by the massacre by crew members of more than 150 Fijians on board the brig Carl.

Two British commissioners were sent to Fiji to investigate the possibility of an annexation. The negotiations were concluded with Thurston himself acting as Premier, from 23 March to 10 October 1874, when Cakobau and his fellow-chiefs formally ceded the archipelago to the United Kingdom.

Thurston later served as Colonial Secretary. In this capacity, he persuaded the Colonial Sugar Refining Company to extend its operations into Fiji by providing it with 2,000 acres (8.1 km^{2}) of land to establish its plantations.

1879 Thurston became the secretary to the High Commissioner.

In February 1888, Thurston became Governor of Fiji, a position he held until he died on 7 February 1897.

== Botanical contributions ==
Thurston was also responsible for the establishment of Suva Botanical Gardens, later named Thurston Gardens in his honour. Thurston's Palm (Pritchardia thurstonii) is named after him.

== Personal life ==
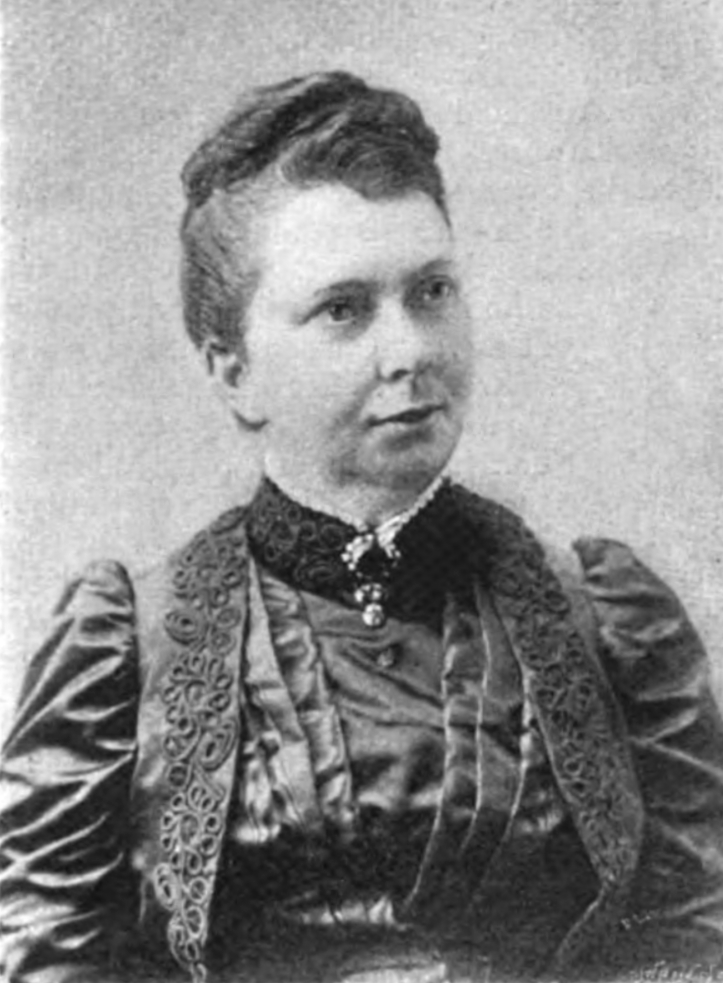
Amelia, Lady Thurston

He married, first, about 1866, a French lady, Madame Marie de Lavalatte (died 14 December 1881); secondly, on 14 January 1883, Amelia, daughter of John Berry of Albury, New South Wales, who, with three sons and two daughters, survived him. The British government granted Lady Thurston a civil list pension in consideration of her husband's services, and the government of Fiji a pension of 50l. to each of the five children during minority.

In 1895 Thurston's health gave way, and he returned to England on leave. Returning to his post in 1896, he died at sea on S.S. Burrumbeet 7 February 1897, between Sydney and Melbourne. Sir John Bates Thurston is buried in Melbourne General Cemetery and his grave site has its upkeep paid by the Fijian Government. He was appointed Companion of the Order of St Michael and St George in 1880, and Knight Commander of that same order in 1887; he was a fellow of the Linnean and Geographical societies.

Coat of arms of John Bates Thurston
| Crest A stork Argent legged Azure Escutcheon Sable three bugle horns stringed Or garnished Azure. |

Political offices
| Preceded by George Austin Woods | Premier of the Kingdom of Viti (acting); 1874 | office abolished |
Government offices
| Preceded by Sir Charles Mitchell | High Commissioner for the Western Pacific; 1888–1897 | Succeeded by Sir George Thomas Michael O'Brien |
| Preceded by Sir Charles Mitchell | Governor of Fiji; 1888–1897 | Succeeded by Sir George Thomas Michael O'Brien |
