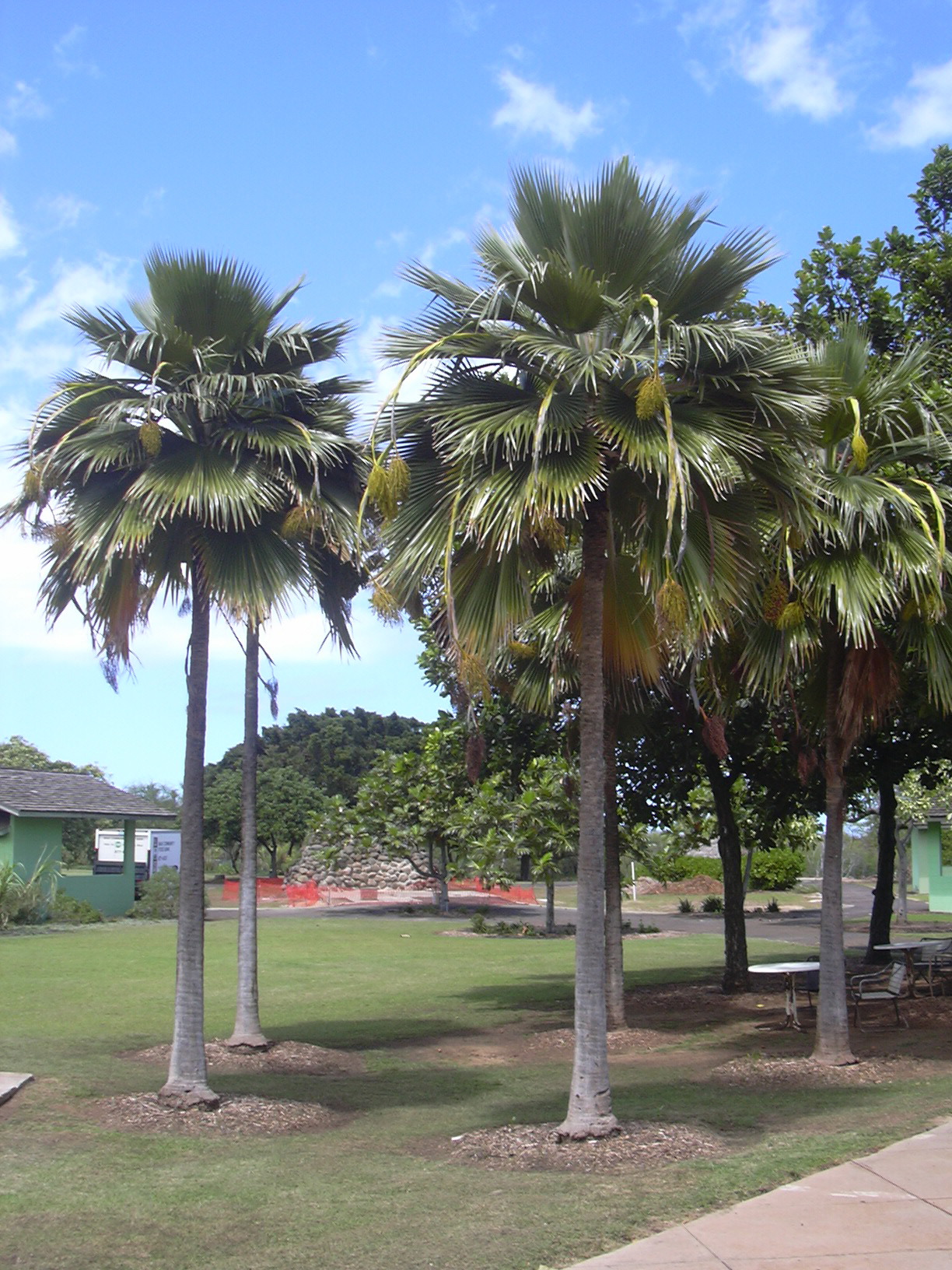

Conservation status
- Vulnerable (IUCN 3.1)

Scientific classification
- Kingdom: Plantae
- Clade: Embryophytes
- Clade: Tracheophytes
- Clade: Spermatophytes
- Clade: Angiosperms
- Clade: Monocots
- Clade: Commelinids
- Order: Arecales
- Family: Arecaceae
- Tribe: Trachycarpeae
- Genus: Pritchardia
- Species: P. thurstonii

Binomial name
- Pritchardia thurstonii F.Muell. & Drude

= Pritchardia thurstonii =

Species of palm

Pritchardia thurstonii is a species of flowering plant in the family Arecaceae. It is native to Fiji, in particular the Lau Islands, and the island of ʻEua in Tonga. It is vulnerable and threatened by habitat loss.

It is sometimes known as the Thurston's palm or the Lau fan palm and is named after a former Fijian Governor John Bates Thurston.

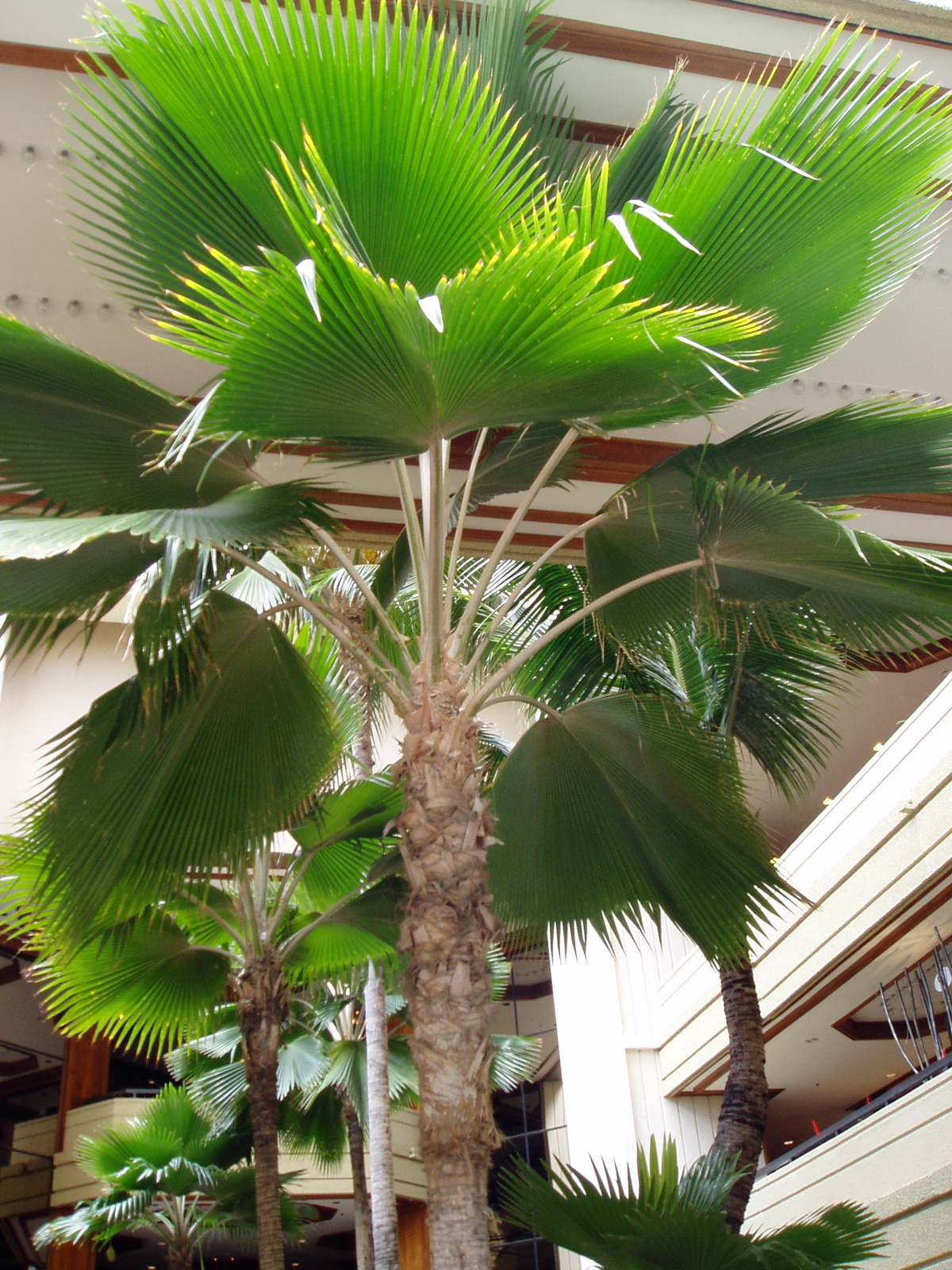
Pritchardia thurstonii growing indoors in Waikiki, Hawaii

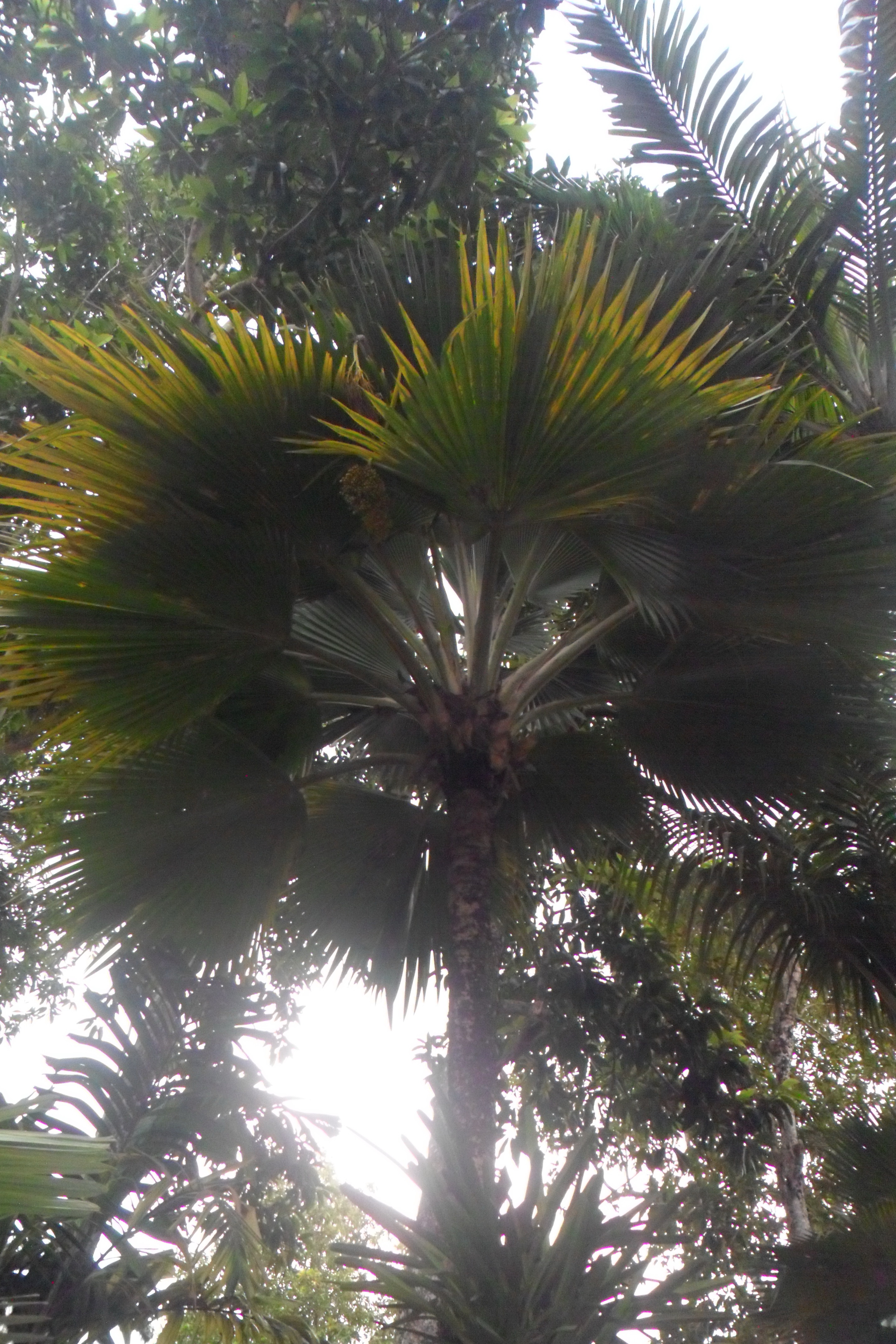
Pritchardia thurstonii in Nong Nooch Tropical Garden
