= Sydney Burt =

Fijian politician

The Honourable Sydney Charles Burt

1st Premier of the Kingdom of Viti
- In office 5 June 1871 – 18 May 1872
- Monarch: Seru Epenisa Cakobau
- Succeeded by: George Austin Woods

3rd Attorney General of Fiji
- In office 1873–1874
- Monarch: Seru Epenisa Cakobau
- Preceded by: Charles Rossiter Forwood
- Succeeded by: J.H. De Ricci

Personal details
- Born: c. 1826
- Died: 1892 (aged 65–66) (?)
- Spouse: Alice Frances Holmes (m. 24 June 1851)
- Profession: Lawyer

Sydney Charles Burt (c. 1826–c. 1892) was the first Premier of the Kingdom of Viti (1871–1872). He then served as Attorney General from 1873 to 1874.

== Early life ==
Burt was born in 1831 in Sydney, New South Wales, Australia. He was the son of John Burt and Martha.

== Personal life ==
He married Alice Frances Holmes on 24 June 1851. Burt was the father of five children.

Political offices
| Preceded by None (Office created) | Premier of the Kingdom of Viti; 1871–1872 | Succeeded by George Austin Woods |
Legal offices
| Preceded by Charles Rossiter Forwood | Attorney-General of Fiji; 1873–1874 | Succeeded by James Herman De Ricci |
