= Tanoa Visawaqa =

Fijian chieftain and Vunivalu of Bau (d. 1852)

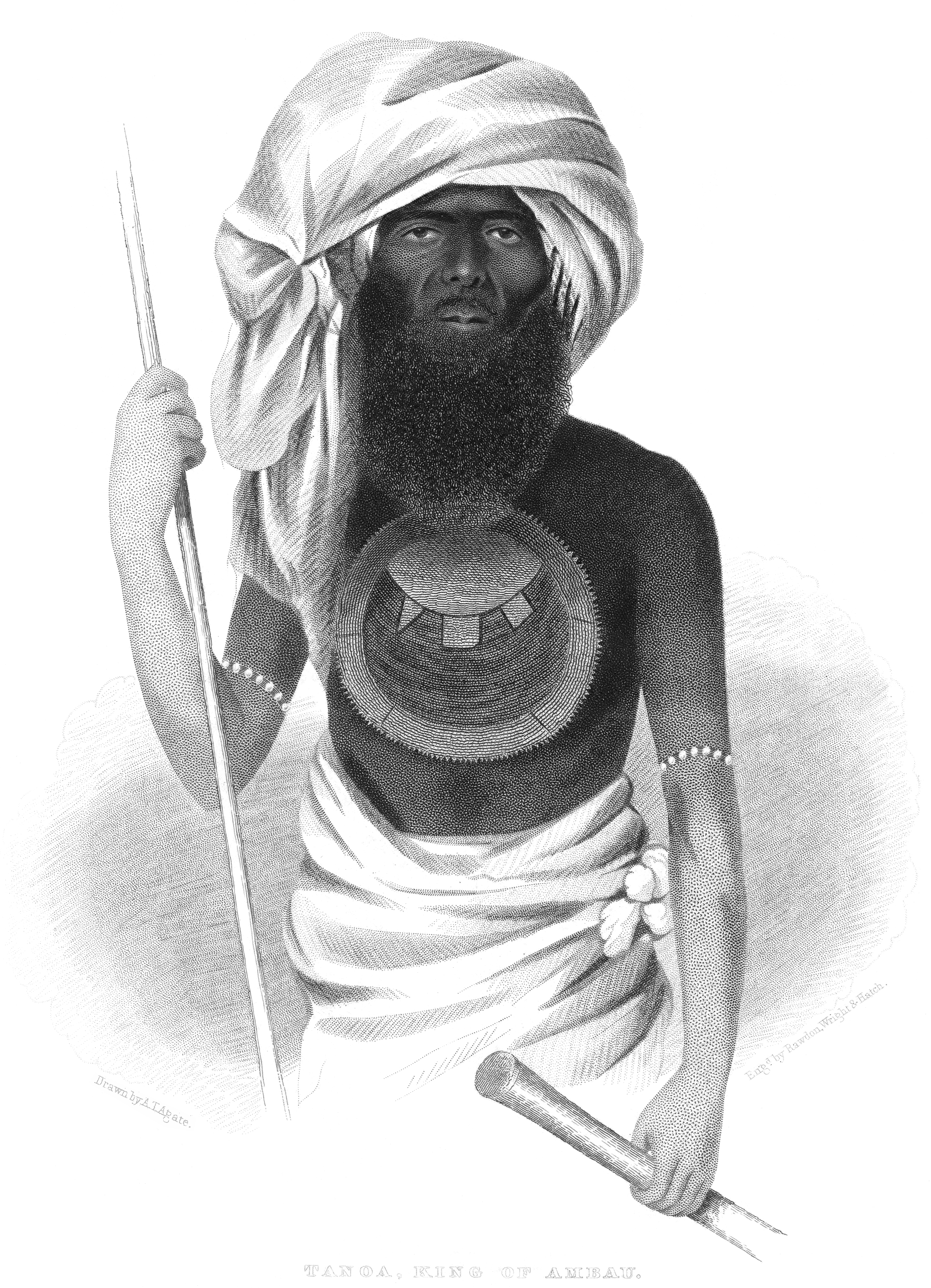
Ratu Tanoa Visawaqa as drawn by Alfred Thomas Agate, US Exploring Expedition

Ratu Tanoa Visawaqa (pronounced [βisaːˈɰaːŋɡa]) (died on 8 December 1852) was a Fijian Chieftain who held the title 5th Vunivalu of Bau. With Adi Savusavu, one of his nine wives, he was the father of Ratu Seru Epenisa Cakobau, who succeeded in unifying Fiji with the help from British missionaries and the crown into forming the contemporary Fiji today.

== Reign ==
Naulivou Ramatenikutu, the current Vunivalu of Bau and Visawaqa's brother, died in a conflict at Bau in 1832. Visawaqa succeeded him as the 5th Vunivalu. Ratu Mara, Seru Tanoa, and other leaders in Bau overthrew Visawaqa in 1832, and he fled to Somosomo, the capital of Cakaudrove. Visawaqa, with the help of his 20-year old son son Seru Epenisa Cakobau, reclaimed power in 1837. According to legend Seru adopted the name Cakobau in honour of this victory.

Alfred Thomas Agate created a portrait of Visawaqa. This portrait happened to be one of the first depictions of the black-lip pearl oyster.

In the 1830s, the captain of the French ship L'Aimable Joséphine agreed to help rebels attack Visawaqa at Somosomo. However, this force was unable to breach Visawaqa's fortifications.

Visawaqa retained his power as Vunivalu, but his son Cakobau was the de facto ruler. Cakobau was in charge of Bau's trade negotiations and led it in war. Visawaqa died in 1852, and was succeeded by Cakobau as the 6th Vunivalu in 1852. Cakobau later formed the Kingdom of Fiji in the 1870s.

== Personal life ==
Visawaqa married Adi Talatoka. He was the father of Loaloadravu Tubuanakoro and Cakobau.

== Works cited ==
=== Books ===
- Konishi, Shino; Nugent, Maria; Shellam, Tiffany, eds. (2015). Indigenous Intermediaries: New perspectives on exploration archives. ANU Press. ISBN 9781925022766.
- MacNaught, Timothy (2016). Fijian Colonial Experience: A study of the neotraditional order under British colonial rule prior to World War II. ANU Press. ISBN 9781921934353.
- Shoemaker, Nancy (2019). Pursuing Respect in the Cannibal Isles: Americans in Nineteenth-Century Fiji. Cornell University Press. ISBN 9781501740343.

=== Journals ===
- "Back Matter". Anthropology Today. 31 (2). Royal Anthropological Institute of Great Britain and Ireland. 2015. doi:10.2307/44081884. JSTOR 44081884.

Preceded by Ratu Naulivou Ramatenikutu	Vunivalu of Bau (1st Term); 1829–1832	Succeeded by Ratu Navuaka Komainaqaranikula, Tui Veikoso
Preceded by Ratu Navuaka Komainaqaranikula, Tui Veikoso	Vunivalu of Bau (2nd Term); 1837–1852	Succeeded by Ratu Seru Epenisa Cakobau, Tui Viti
