= Battle of Kaba =

Battle

- Part of Fijian Civil War
Date	April 7th, 1855
Location	Kaba, Fiji 18.003250°S 178.690833°E
Result	Fijian-Tongan victory

Belligerents
Fiji; Tonga	Rewa Province; Bau

Commanders and leaders
Cakobau; Taufa'ahau; Enele Ma'afu	Mara

Strength
3,000; 2,000	6,000

Casualties and losses
Fiji 800; Tonga 700 killed, 60 wounded	2,000 killed, 600 captured

The Battle of Kaba was fought at Kaba, Fiji, in 1855 between self proclaimed Fijian Tui Viti (King) Cakobau and his enemies from Rewa and Bau. In 1853, Cokobau had previously attempted to take the rebel positions at Kaba, in which he was brutally defeated. This time though Cakobau was supported by a strong fleet from Tonga, sent by Tu'i Kanokupolu (King) Taufa'ahau (George I) of Tonga and Enele Ma'afu, governor of the Tongan population in Fiji. The battle was a major victory for Cakobau, thanks mainly to his Tongan allies, and cemented his leadership over Fiji. It also, however, underlined his dependency on the military power of Tonga, especially since Ma'afu remained in Fiji.

== Battle ==
Ratu Mara and his men took up position on the promontories of the small town of Kaba. Cakobau and his alliance pushed into the town during the early hours of the 7th of April. Some of Cakobau's men had firearms which they had traded to American sailors for in return for rice wine. Cakobau's men annihilated Mara's, who broke after 2 hours of fighting. 200 of Mara's men were killed, and another 200 were captured. To show his kindness, Cakobau let the prisoners go. Mara fled to Levuka where he was soon captured and hanged.

== Sources ==
- Huffer, Elise, Grands Hommes et Petites Îles: La Politique Extérieure de Fidji, de Tonga et du Vanuatu, Paris: Orstom, 1993, ISBN 2-7099-1125-6
- Historical timeline, Fiji Government Online Portal
