= Colony of Fiji =

British colony in Oceania from 1874 to 1970

Coordinates: 17.6840°S 178.8401°E

- 1874–1970
- Flag Coat of arms
- Motto: Rerevaka na Kalou ka Doka na Tui; Fear God and honour the Queen
- Anthem: God Save the King/Queen
- Status: British colony
- Capital: Levuka (1874–1877); Suva (1877–1970)
- Common languages: English, iTaukei (Fijian), Fiji Hindi, Rotuman
- Government: Constitutional monarchy
- Monarch
  - 1874–1901: Victoria
  - 1901–1910: Edward VII
  - 1910–1936: George V
  - 1936: Edward VIII
  - 1936–1952: George VI
  - 1952–1970: Elizabeth II
- Governor
  - 1874–1875: Sir Hercules Robinson
  - 1968–1970: Sir Robert Sidney Foster
- Chief Minister
  - 1967–1970: Sir Kamisese Mara
- Legislature: Legislative Council
- History
  - Established: 10 October 1874
  - Independence: 10 October 1970
- Currency: Fijian pound (1874–1969); Fijian dollar (1969–1970)
Preceded by	Succeeded by
Kingdom of Fiji	Dominion of Fiji
- Today part of: Fiji

The Colony of Fiji was a Crown colony that existed from 1874 to 1970 in the territory of the present-day nation of Fiji. London declined its first opportunity to annex Fiji in 1852. Ratu Seru Epenisa Cakobau had offered to cede the islands, subject to being allowed to retain his Tui Viti (King of Fiji) title. His demand was unacceptable to both the British and to many of his fellow chiefs, who regarded him only as first among equals, if that. Mounting debts and threats from the United States Navy had led Cakobau to establish a constitutional monarchy with a government dominated by European settlers in 1871, following an agreement with the Australian Polynesia Company to pay his debts. The collapse of the new regime drove him to make another offer of cession in 1872, which the British accepted. On 10 October 1874, Britain began its rule of Fiji, which lasted until 10 October 1970.

== "Fiji for the Fijians" ==
Sir Hercules Robinson, who had arrived on 23 September 1874, was appointed as interim Governor. He was replaced in June 1875 by Sir Arthur Gordon. Rather than establish direct rule in all spheres, Gordon granted autonomy over local affairs to Fiji's chiefs, though they were now forbidden to engage in tribal warfare. The colony was divided into four regions, each under the control of a Roko; these regions were further subdivided into twelve districts, each ruled by a traditional chief. A Great Council of Chiefs was established in 1876 to advise the Governor. This body remained in existence until being suspended by the Military-backed interim government in 2007 and abolished in 2012. Under the 1997 Constitution, it functioned as an electoral college that chose Fiji's President, Vice-President, and 14 of the 32 Senators. In its early days, the Great Council was supplemented by a Native Regulation Board (now the Fijian Affairs Board); these two bodies together made laws for the Fijians. (European settlers, however, were not subject to its laws). In 1882, the capital was moved from Levuka to the more accessible Suva.

Adopting a "Fiji for the Fijians" policy, Gordon prohibited further sales of land, although it could be leased. This policy has been continued, hardly modified, to this day, and some 83 percent of the land is still natively owned. He also banned the exploitation of Fijians as labourers, and following the failure of the cotton-growing enterprise in the early 1870s, Gordon decided in 1878 to import indentured labourers from India to work on the sugarcane fields that had taken the place of the cotton plantations. The 463 Indians arrived on 14 May 1879—the first of some 61,000 that were to come before the scheme ended in 1916. The plan involved bringing the Indian workers to Fiji on a five-year contract, after which they could return to India at their own expense; if they chose to renew their contract for a second five-year term, they would be given the option of returning to India at the government's expense or remaining in Fiji. The great majority chose to stay. The Queensland Act, which regulated indentured labour in Queensland, was made law in Fiji also.

During the period of Gordon's governorship, the Little War (which he named), broke out in the West Colo, the highlands inhabited by the Kai Colo. During the war, he sent a force of 2,000 to successfully put down the rebels who rejected Christian missions and encroaching British authority over the interior.

== Fiji in the First World War ==
Fiji was only peripherally involved in the First World War, which was fought mainly in Europe. More than 1,500 men volunteered for war service with British forces. Other volunteers saw service with Australian and NZ forces. One notable incident occurred in September 1917 when Felix Graf von Luckner arrived at Wakaya Island, off the eastern coast of Viti Levu, after his raider, the Seeadler, had run aground in the Cook Islands following the shelling of Papeete in the French territory of Tahiti. On 21 September, the district police inspector took a number of Fijians to Wakaya, and Graf von Luckner, not realising that they were unarmed, unwittingly surrendered.

Citing unwillingness to exploit the Fijian people, the colonial authorities did not permit Fijians to enlist. One Fijian of chiefly rank, a great-grandson of Cakobau's, did join the French Foreign Legion, however, and received the French military decoration, the Medalle Militaire. Sukuna later served with 100 other Fijians of the Fiji Labour Corps which served in a logistics role in France and Italy. In the years that followed, Ratu Sir Lala Sukuna, as he was later known, established himself as a leading chief in Fiji and set up institutions that safeguarded native Fijian land rights.

== Fiji in the Second World War ==
When the Second World War broke out, many Fijians volunteered for military service with the Fiji Military Forces, which was commanded by a New Zealand Army officer under a 1936 agreement with the British that New Zealand assume responsibility for the defence of Fiji. Two Fiji infantry battalions and commando units saw service with US Army units in Guadalcanal and Bougainville.

The Empire of Japan's attack on Pearl Harbor, on 8 December 1941 (Fiji time), marked the beginning of the Pacific War. Japanese submarines launched seaplanes that flew over Fiji; Japanese submarine I-25 on 17 March 1942 and Japanese submarine I-10 on 30 November 1941.

Because of its central location, Fiji was selected as a training base for the Allies. An airstrip was built at Nadi (later to become an international airport), and gun emplacements studded the coast. Fijians gained a reputation for bravery in the Solomon Islands campaign, with one war correspondent describing their ambush tactics as "death with velvet gloves." Corporal Sefanaia Sukanaivalu, of Yucata, was posthumously awarded the Victoria Cross, as a result of his bravery in the Battle of Bougainville.

Indo-Fijians, however, generally refused to enlist, after their demand for equal treatment to Europeans was refused. They disbanded a platoon they had organised, and contributed nothing more than one officer and 70 enlisted men in a reserve transport section, on condition that they not be sent overseas. The refusal of Indo-Fijians to play an active role in the war efforts became part of the ideological construction employed by Fijian ethno-nationalists to justify interethnic tensions in the post-war years.

== The development of political institutions ==
A Legislative Council, initially with advisory powers, had existed as an appointed body since 1874, but in 1904 it was made a partly elective body, with European male settlers empowered to elect 6 of the 19 Councillors. 2 members were appointed by the colonial Governor from a list of 6 candidates submitted by the Great Council of Chiefs; a further 8 "official" members were appointed by the Governor at his own discretion. The Governor himself was the 19th member. The first nominated Indian member was appointed in 1916; this position was made elective from 1929. A four-member Executive Council had also been established in 1904; this was not a "Cabinet" in the modern sense, as its members were not responsible to the Legislative Council.

After the Second World War, Fiji began to take its first steps towards internal self-government. The Legislative Council was expanded to 32 members in 1953, 15 of them elected and divided equally among the three major ethnic constituencies (indigenous Fijians, Indo-Fijians, and Europeans). Indo-Fijian and European electors voted directly for 3 of the 5 members allocated to them (the other two were appointed by the Governor); the 5 indigenous Fijian members were all nominated by the Great Council of Chiefs. Ratu Sukuna was chosen as the first Speaker. Although the Legislative Council still had few of the powers of the modern Parliament, it brought native Fijians and Indo-Fijians into the official political structure for the first time, and fostered the beginning of a modern political culture in Fiji.

These steps towards self-rule were welcomed by the Indo-Fijian community, which by that time had come to outnumber the native Fijian population. Fearing Indo-Fijian domination, many Fijian chiefs saw the benevolent rule of the British as preferable to Indo-Fijian control and resisted British moves towards autonomy. By this time, however, the United Kingdom had apparently decided to divest itself of its colonial empire and pressed ahead with reforms. The Fijian people as a whole were enfranchised for the first time in 1963, when the legislature was made a wholly elective body, except for 2 members out of 36 nominated by the Great Council of Chiefs. 1964 saw the first step towards responsible government, with the introduction of the Member system. Specific portfolios were given to certain elected members of the Legislative Council. They did not constitute a Cabinet in the Westminster sense of the term, as they were officially advisers to the colonial Governor rather than ministers with executive authority, and were responsible only to the Governor, not to the legislature. Nevertheless, over the ensuing three years, the then Governor, Sir Derek Jakeway, treated the Members more and more like ministers, to prepare them for the advent of responsible government.

== Responsible government ==
A constitutional conference was held in London in July 1965, to discuss constitutional changes with a view to introducing responsible government. Indo-Fijians, led by A. D. Patel, demanded the immediate introduction of full self-government, with a fully elected legislature, to be elected by universal suffrage on a common voters' roll. These demands were vigorously rejected by the ethnic Fijian delegation, who still feared loss of control over natively owned land and resources should an Indo-Fijian dominated government come to power. The British made it clear, however, that they were determined to bring Fiji to self-government and eventual independence. Realizing that they had no choice, Fiji's chiefs decided to negotiate for the best deal they could get.

A series of compromises led to the establishment of a cabinet system of government in 1967, with Ratu Kamisese Mara as the first Chief Minister. Ongoing negotiations between Mara and Sidiq Koya, who had taken over the leadership of the mainly Indo-Fijian National Federation Party on Patel's death in 1969, led to a second constitutional conference in London, in April 1970, at which Fiji's Legislative Council agreed on a compromise electoral formula and a timetable for independence as a fully sovereign and independent nation with the Commonwealth. The Legislative Council would be replaced with a bicameral Parliament, with a Senate dominated by Fijian chiefs and a popularly elected House of Representatives. In the 52-member House, Native Fijians and Indo-Fijians would each be allocated 22 seats, of which 12 would represent Communal constituencies comprising voters registered on strictly ethnic roles, and another 10 representing National constituencies to which members were allocated by ethnicity but elected by universal suffrage. A further 8 seats were reserved for "General electors" - Europeans, Chinese, Banaban Islanders, and other minorities; 3 of these were "communal" and 5 "national". With this compromise, Fiji became independent on 10 October 1970.

== See also ==
- Kingdom of Fiji
- Monarchy of Fiji
- History of Fiji
- Fiji during the time of Cakobau
- Military history of the British Commonwealth in the Second World War
