= George Austin Woods =

George Austin Woods (1828 – 1905, in Suva) was a British navy officer who served as premier of the Kingdom of Viti between May 1872 and 1874.

Woods served as lieutenant in the Royal Navy. His father, George, had also served in the Royal Navy and so had others of his relatives. He then worked as marine surveyor in New Zealand. In February 1871 he arrived in Fiji, hoping to work as surveyor there. Once in Fiji he came into contact with King Seru Epenisa Cakobau. He went on to serve as Premier in Cakobau's cabinet. He also served as Minister of Land and Works and as Minister of Native Affairs at the same time. He focused on the financial management of the state. When chiefs demanded that Woods be excluded from meetings of Fijian ministers, Cakobau named him as Tui Kaba, adopting him into the Bauan ruling family.
