= Monarchy of Fiji =

Title of the former head of state of Fiji

- Coat of arms of Fiji (Note: Left: 1871–1874 Right: 1908 – present)

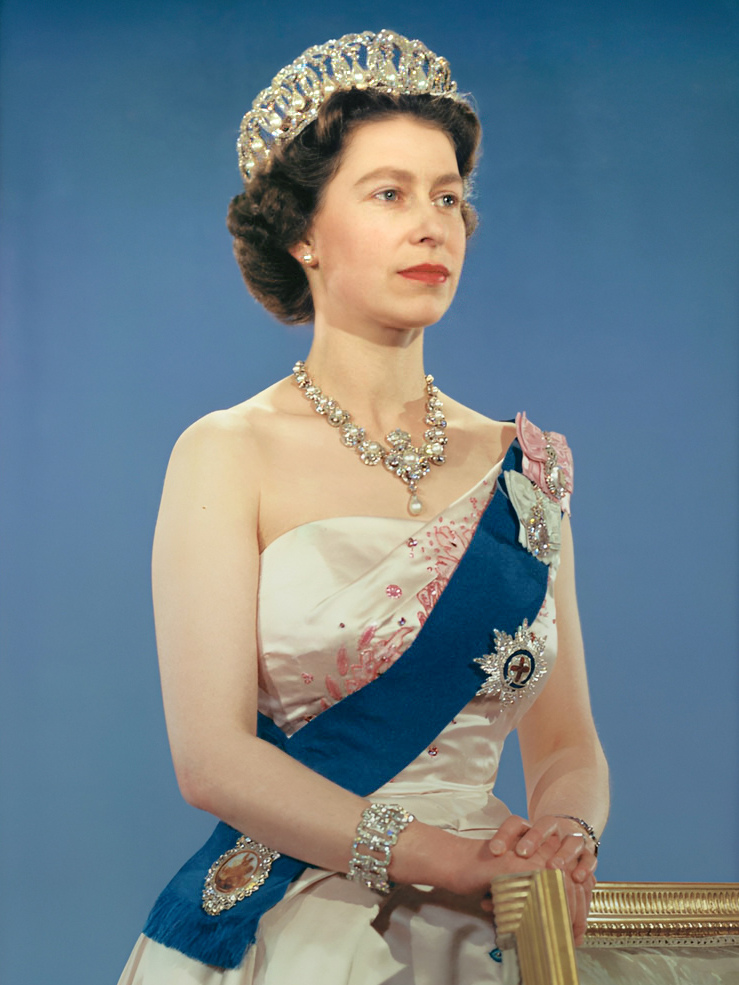
- Last to reign Elizabeth II; 10 October 1970 – 10 October 1987 (Note: Recognised as Tui Viti (Paramount Chief of Fiji) by Great Council of Chiefs in 1998, although this title was not recognised by the Fijian government.)

Details
- First monarch: Seru Epenisa Cakobau
- Last monarch: Elizabeth II
- Formed: 5 June 1871
- Abolished: 10 October 1987 (1987 Fijian coups d'état)

The monarchy of Fiji emerged in the 19th century, when native ruler Seru Epenisa Cakobau consolidated control of the Fijian Islands in 1871 and declared himself king, or paramount chief, of Fiji (Fijian: Tui Viti). Three years later, he voluntarily ceded sovereignty of the islands to Britain, making Fiji a crown colony within the British Empire.

Fiji was ceded to Britain on 10 October 1874. The capital was formally established at Levuka on the island of Ovalau. Levuka was proclaimed Fiji's first town in 1877, but soon after, it was decided to move the capital to Suva. In 1879, in order to meet labour needs, indentured labourers from India were brought to Fiji. The first lot arrived at Levuka on 14 May 1879.

On 10 October 1970, after nearly a century of British rule, Fiji became a Commonwealth realm — an independent state within the Commonwealth of Nations — with Elizabeth II as Queen of Fiji. The country gained the official title Dominion of Fiji. Following two military coups in 1987, led by Lieutenant-Colonel Sitiveni Rabuka, Fiji became a republic with Rabuka as President.

The Great Council of Chiefs continued to recognise Elizabeth II as Tui Viti, or the traditional Queen of Fiji, notwithstanding Fiji's status as a Commonwealth republic. The position was not constitutional, nor otherwise legal in nature. The Council was disestablished in 2012, before being re-established in 2023. Elizabeth II did not use the title, nor did the Fijian government recognise it.

The Crown continues to play a cultural role in Fiji; the country's motto translates to "Fear God and honour the King" (or Queen, monarch depending). The potential for the official reinstatement of the Crown in Fiji has even been left open by Fijian leaders.

== History ==
=== Reign of Seru Epenisa Cakobau (1871–1874) ===
Royal Standard of Cakobau as King of Fiji, 1871–1874

Seru Epenisa, known as "Cakobau", or "destroyer of Bau", ruled the short lived Kingdom of Fiji as Tui Viti, which translates as "King of Fiji" or "paramount chief of Fiji". On 8 December 1852, Cakobau succeeded as Vunivalu of Bau. Claiming that Bau had suzerainty over the remainder of Fiji, he asserted that he was the king of Fiji. However, Cakobau's claim was not accepted by other chiefs, who regarded him, at best, as the first among equals. Cakobau consequently engaged in constant warfare for almost nineteen years to unify the islands under his authority.

Supported by foreign settlers, he finally succeeded in creating a united Fijian kingdom in 1871, and established Levuka as his capital. He decided to set up a constitutional monarchy, and the first legislative assembly met in November of that year. Both the legislature and the Cabinet were dominated by foreigners. He gave his war club to Queen Victoria on 10 October 1874, when he signed the Deed of Cession, that granted the British Empire sovereignty over the islands in 1874.

=== Reign of Elizabeth II (1970–1987) ===
The proclamation of the Queen's title published in the Fiji Royal Gazette

Ninety-six years of British rule came to an end in 1970, and Fiji gained independence as a Commonwealth realm—a sovereign state within the Commonwealth of Nations with the British monarch, then Queen Elizabeth II, as head of state—though the then-Leader of the Opposition, Sidiq Koya, had envisioned an independent Fiji as a republic. The official name of the country was the Dominion of Fiji. The Queen of Fiji was represented by a governor-general and was also queen of other countries, such as Australia, Canada, New Zealand, and the United Kingdom. The Queen's realms were all independent from one another and the Queen acted independently in each realm; however, they shared the same person as monarch. As a constitutional monarchy, executive power was held by a prime minister, usually the leader of the majority party in an elected legislature. The prime minister was appointed by the governor-general.

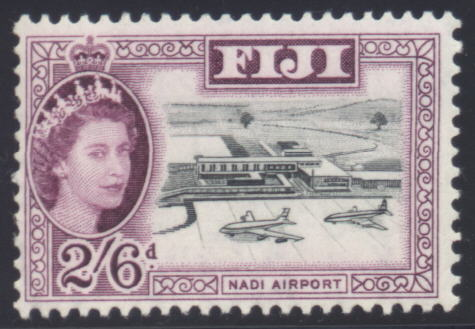
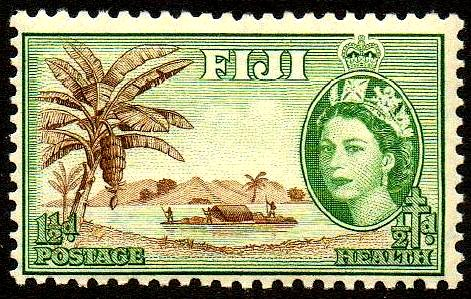
Queen Elizabeth II on Fijian stamps

== Republic ==
On 14 May 1987, a coup led by Sitiveni Rabuka resulted in the overthrow of the government of Prime Minister Timoci Bavadra, who had been appointed following the general election that year. The Supreme Court of Fiji ruled the coup unconstitutional and Governor-General Ratu Sir Penaia Ganilau, with the public support of the Queen, unsuccessfully attempted to assert executive power. He opened negotiations—known as the Deuba Talks—with both the deposed government and the Alliance Party, which most indigenous Fijians supported. These negotiations culminated in the Deuba Accord of 23 September 1987, which provided for a government of national unity, with both parties represented under the leadership of the Governor-General.

Fearing that the gains of the first coup were about to be lost, Rabuka staged a second coup on 25 September. The Queen declared the Governor-General was the "sole legitimate source of the executive authority in Fiji" and expressed hope for "the process of restoring Fiji to constitutional normality." Regardless, one week later, Rabuka abolished the monarchy, made Fiji a republic, and declared himself the head of state. With the Queen now seeing the situation as untenable, she pressed Ganilau to resign as governor-general, which he did on 15 October 1987. Speaking to Robert Hardman, Michael Heseltine, who had been in the British government at the time of the coups, said, "the Queen took the initiative to suggest to [Ganilau] that the time had come for him to accept that Fiji was now a republic [...] Mrs Thatcher [the British Prime Minister] was quite opposed to the idea of the Queen, as it were, abdicating. But, it wasn't up to her because it was as Queen of Fiji that she [Elizabeth] had come to this conclusion." The Queen released a message stating she was "sad to think the ending of Fijian allegiance to the Crown should have been brought about without the people of Fiji being given an opportunity to express their opinion on the proposal."

At their meeting that year, the heads of government of the member-states of the Commonwealth of Nations were divided on Fiji remaining in the organization. As such, Fiji's membership was deemed to have lapsed.

Ten years later, after constitutional talks and an election, Rabuka presented a tabua—a tooth of a sperm whale—to Elizabeth II during the Commonwealth Heads of Government conference in Edinburgh, Scotland. This gesture from Rabuka, by then the Prime Minister of Fiji, is a traditional sign of profound respect and was given as an apology for having broken his oath of allegiance to Queen Elizabeth as an officer of the Fijian military. The agreed constitution of 1997 provided for a president as head of state and chosen by the Great Council of Chiefs, a formal body of mostly hereditary chiefs. Fiji has since been a republic within the Commonwealth of Nations.

== Current position ==
Despite abolishing the monarchy in 1987, Fiji continued to issue new banknotes and coins with the Queen's portrait until 2012.

Though Fiji has been a republic since 1987 and was suspended from the Commonwealth for a second time between 2009 and 2014, the Queen's effigy was still displayed on Fiji's currency and the Queen's Official Birthday remained a public holiday until 2012, when the government headed by Frank Bainimarama abolished it and replaced the Queen's image on banknotes and coins with indigenous flora and fauna. St Edward's Crown continued to form part of military and police badges. The Queen and the royal family retained widespread affection among the Fijian people, and there have been sporadic public debates on whether to return to a constitutional monarchy. The motto of the republic remains "Fear God and honour the King" (or Queen), or (Fijian: Rere vaka na kalou ka doka na Tui), which was adopted by Cakobau in 1871.

The rank insignia of a Fijian Rear admiral (left) and Commissioner of the Fijian Police (right)

The Great Council of Chiefs debated Elizabeth II's role as "supreme tribal chief" and sovereign of Fiji in 1988. On behalf of the Council, the Chairman, Epeli Ganilau, the son of Penaia Ganilau, said in 2002 that, "the royal Tui Viti and the Vunivalu titles had been bestowed upon the English throne in a traditional installation procedure in 1902 and confirmed in 1937". He reiterated that Elizabeth II was still the traditional queen, or paramount chief, of Fiji, or Tui Viti, even though this position no longer conferred any constitutional prerogatives and it was "not widely known that she is the paramount chief of Fiji in the traditional sense; only some of the Council members remembered her status."

As Elizabeth II made no official claim to the Tui Viti title and it is not officially recognised by the current Fijian government, it remains dormant in usage. When the subject of restoration was broached by Sitiveni Rabuka during a meeting with the Queen in 1997, her response was simple: "Let the people decide."

After another coup in 2000, further political tension led to a fourth coup in 2006. The Great Council of Chiefs was suspended in 2007 and the constitution, which gave the Council the right to appoint the head of state from among its members, was suspended in 2009. On 14 March 2012, the Council was formally dis-established. It was re-established in 2024.

During his premiership, Bainimarama expressed a desire to restore the monarchy in Fiji, having displayed portraits of the former Queen and her consort, Prince Philip, Duke of Edinburgh, above his office desk. He has also described himself as "a Queen's man" and a monarchist: "I'm still loyal to the Queen. Many people are in Fiji. One of the things I'd like to do is see her restored as our monarch, to be Queen of Fiji again."

In 2024, Rabuka, now prime minister, presented an official apology to Elizabeth's son, King Charles III, for his role in the 1987 coup during a visit to Britain. Rabuka left open the possibility of Fiji reinstating the Crown: "If there was any wish for Fiji to return to the realm, as her late Majesty had told me and as His Majesty said to me last week, let it be the will of the people."

== List of Fijian monarchs ==
Name	Portrait	Arms	Birth	Reign	Marriage(s)	Death
Sovereign of the Kingdom of Fiji (1871–1874)
Seru Epenisa Cakobau			1815; Lakeba, Lau Islands	5 June 1871 (Note: Cakobau had been the Vunivalu (Warlord/Paramount chief) of Bau since 1852. He had long styled himself the Tui Viti (King) of Fiji, but had not been recognized as such by other Ratu (Fijian chiefs), and he exercised no direct authority outside Bau until he unified the country under his rule in 1871. His ancestors, going back as far as 1770, have often erroneously been listed as Kings of Fiji. For more details about this period of Fijian history, see Fiji during the time of Cakobau.) – 10 October 1874 (3 years, 127 days)	Adi Litia Samanunu (1st wife); Adi Salote Qalirea Kaunilotuna (2nd wife); 8 children	1 February 1883 (aged c. 68)
Fiji under colonial rule. No independent monarchy existed (1874–1970)
Sovereign of the Dominion of Fiji (1970–1987)
Elizabeth II			21 April 1926; 17 Bruton Street, Mayfair	10 October 1970 (Note: Elizabeth II became Queen on 6 February 1952, assuming the thrones of the United Kingdom and six other independent countries. Fiji, a Crown colony since its annexation in 1874, was considered a British possession and was under the sovereignty of the Crown. From Fiji's independence on 10 October 1970, the link between the British monarchy and Fiji officially ended, and Elizabeth II became Queen of Fiji, a position independent of her role as British Sovereign. Between 1970 and 1987, the Dominion of Fiji was one of many independent states headed by Elizabeth II.) – 6 October 1987 (16 years, 361 days)	Philip Mountbatten; Westminster Abbey; 20 November 1947; 4 children	8 September 2022 (aged 96)

== Sources ==
- Lal, Brij V. (2010), In the Eye of the Storm Jai Ram Reddy and the Politics of Postcolonial Fiji (PDF), Canberra: Australian National University, ISBN 9781921666520
- Mosese Bulitavo (25 September 2015). "The Politics of Fiji – A Way Forward For ITaukei People". Fiji Sun.
- Mosese Bulitavo (10 October 2015). "Opinion-cleaning-up-our-history-a-way-forward-for-itaukei". Fiji Sun.
- Matanitu The Struggle for Power in Early Fiji, By David Routledge, Published by University of the South Pacific (1985)
- The Pacific Way A Memoir, By Ratu Sir Kamisese Mara, Published by the University of Hawaii Press (1990)
- Fiji and the Fijians Chapter 2 Pages 33–34 by Thomas Williams, James Calvert.
