= Vunivalu of Bau =

Fijian paramount chief of the Kubuna confederacy

Incumbent
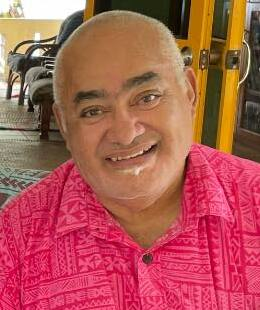
- Epenisa Cakobau since March 10, 2023

Details
- First monarch: Epeli Nailatikau
- Residence: Bau (island)

Turaga Bale na Vunivalu, Tui Kaba na Tui Levuka, shortened as Vunivalu, is the Paramount Chief of the Kubuna Confederacy of the chiefly island of Bau in Fiji. Loosely translated the title means Warlord of Bau or "Root of War". The succession to the title does not follow primogeniture, but the candidate must be a high-ranking member of the Tui Kaba clan.

== History ==
The Vunivalu was not always the senior Chieftain in Kubuna and Bau. When Vueti a great grandson of Lutunasobasoba defeated the Tui Viti's sons at Nakauvadra, he was awarded with a Tui Viti sacred stone- award signifying authority (tawake or flag). From Nakauvadra, he left via Nakorotubu and had his 1st child, a son through supernatural powers or Gonesau known as Nadurucoko who was raised by the Dewala tribe at Korolevu fort in Dewala, Nakorotubu. Nadurucoko the first (1st) Gonesau, was the father of Nabuinivuaka Nailatikau 1- the 1st Vunivalu of Bau. He then continued on his returned journey to Moturiki and finally to Bau. Vueti as the founder of Bau island in short for 'veibauyaki' or nomadic tribe (named after his last temporary nomadic residence in Bau in Wainibuka) was bestowed with the Roko Tui Bau title. Vueti then ordered for a sacred temple to be built in Bau and kept the Tui Viti sacred stone award of authority (tawake) that was given by the chiefs at Nakauvadra at the foundation mound and named the temple as Vatanitawake translated as 'the shelter or shelve of the signifying authority award or flag'.

The Vunivalu of Bau title was considered subordinate to the Roko Tui Bau. Power struggles between the various chiefly households came to a head with the exile of the Vunivalu Tanoa Visawaqa in the early 19th century after a series of murders and reprisals. His son Seru Epenisa Cakobau however was allowed to remain in Bau during his fathers exile. Cakobau gained power by subverting the Lasakau people to plot and execute the overthrow of the ruling group, led by Ratu Ravulo Vakayaliyalo, in 1837; Seru Epenisa Cakobau then reinstated his father as ruler.

Cakobau eventually succeeded to the title himself. He created much of its prestige by styling himself King of Fiji; he led the process that culminated in cession of the islands to the United Kingdom in 1874.

The position fell vacant with the death of Ratu Sir George Cakobau, in 1989. For the next decade, there was a search for a successor. On 9 June 2005, his son Senator Ratu George Cakobau Jr. announced that the chiefs of Matanitu o Bau (the traditional chiefly government of Bau, which includes the districts of Namata, Namara, Nausori, Dravo, Buretu, Kiuva, and Viwa (Fiji), had selected four chiefly candidates, to be submitted to the Tui Kaba clan, which will be asked to choose one of them as the next Vunivalu. The four candidates are Ratu George Cakobau Jr. himself, his brother Ratu Epenisa Cakobau, Ratu George Kadavulevu Naulivou, and former Vice-President Ratu Jope Seniloli. A second meeting held a week later tentatively proposed Senator Cakobau as the new Vunivalu.

Cakobau's appointment had still not been finalized and was not without controversy. Adi Finau Tabakaucoro, a member of the Tui Kaba clan and a senior chief, complained on 27 June that the proper procedures were not being followed. The new Vunivalu should be elected by the whole clan, she said, rather than chosen by a few elders. She thought it wrong to exclude from the list of candidates the name of Senator Cakobau's sister, Adi Samanunu Cakobau-Talakuli, because she was the eldest child of the last Vunivalu.

Attempts to find an agreeable successor again failed in 2012, and the selection process was put on hold for the time being. Former vice-president Seniloli died in 2015 and Senator Cakobau in 2018. In 2023 Ratu Epenisa Cokabau, great-great grandson of Ratu Seru Epenisa Cakobau and king of Fiji, was installed in a traditional ceremony.

== Other titles ==
The head of the Mataqali Tuikaba is first installed by the Butoni people to the chiefly title of Turaga na Vunivalu, Tui Kaba. The Butoni are the traditional installers of this title and now live in Koro.

He is then installed as Tui Levuka by the Yavusa Delaikorolevu people, the vanua of Levuka, who now live in Levuka, Lakeba, Lau. At this installation his principal wife is also installed as Radi Levuka.

Both the Butoni and the Yavusa Delaikorolevu are the iTaukei of Bau Island, and together these installations vest the Head of the Kubuna Confederacy with his three titles: Turaga na Vunivalu, Tui Kaba and Tui Levuka.

== List ==
Order	Portrait	Vunivalu	Reign	Lifespan
1.		Ratu Nailatikau Buinivuaka	? – 1770	? – 1770
2.		Ratu Banuve Baleivavalagi	1770–1803	? – February 1803
3.		Ratu Naulivou Ramatenikutu	1803–1829	? – 1829
4.		Ratu Tanoa Visawaqa	1829–1832	? – 8 December 1852
5.		Ratu Navuaka Komainaqaranikula, Tui Veikoso	1832–1837	? – ?
6.		Ratu Tanoa Visawaqa	1837–1852	s.a.
7.		Ratu Seru Epenisa Cakobau, Tui Viti	1852–1883	1815 – 1 February 1883
8.		Ratu Epeli Nailatikau I†	1883–1901	1842–1901
9.		Ratu Penaia Kadavulevu†	1901–1914	? – 1914
10.		Ratu Popi Seniloli	1914–1936	1883 – 11 October 1936
11.		Ratu Tevita Naulivou†	1936–1957	? – 1957
12.		Ratu Sir George Cakobau	1957–1989	6 November 1912 – 25 November 1989
13.		Ratu Epenisa Cakobau	since 2023	1959/1960
† Never officially installed as Vunivalu, but posthumously generally recognized as such. Note that the position of Vunivalu has often fallen vacant for lengthy periods. It was thought that disagreements about the succession had kept the title vacant since the death of Ratu Sir George Cakobau in 1989.

== See also ==
- Roko Tui Bau, secondary chief of Bau
- Tui Viti, which means 'King of Fiji' in the Fijian language.
