= Seru Epenisa Cakobau =

King of Fiji from 1871 to 1874

Ratu Seru Epenisa Cakobau
- King of Fiji; 6th Vunivalu of Bau; King of Bau
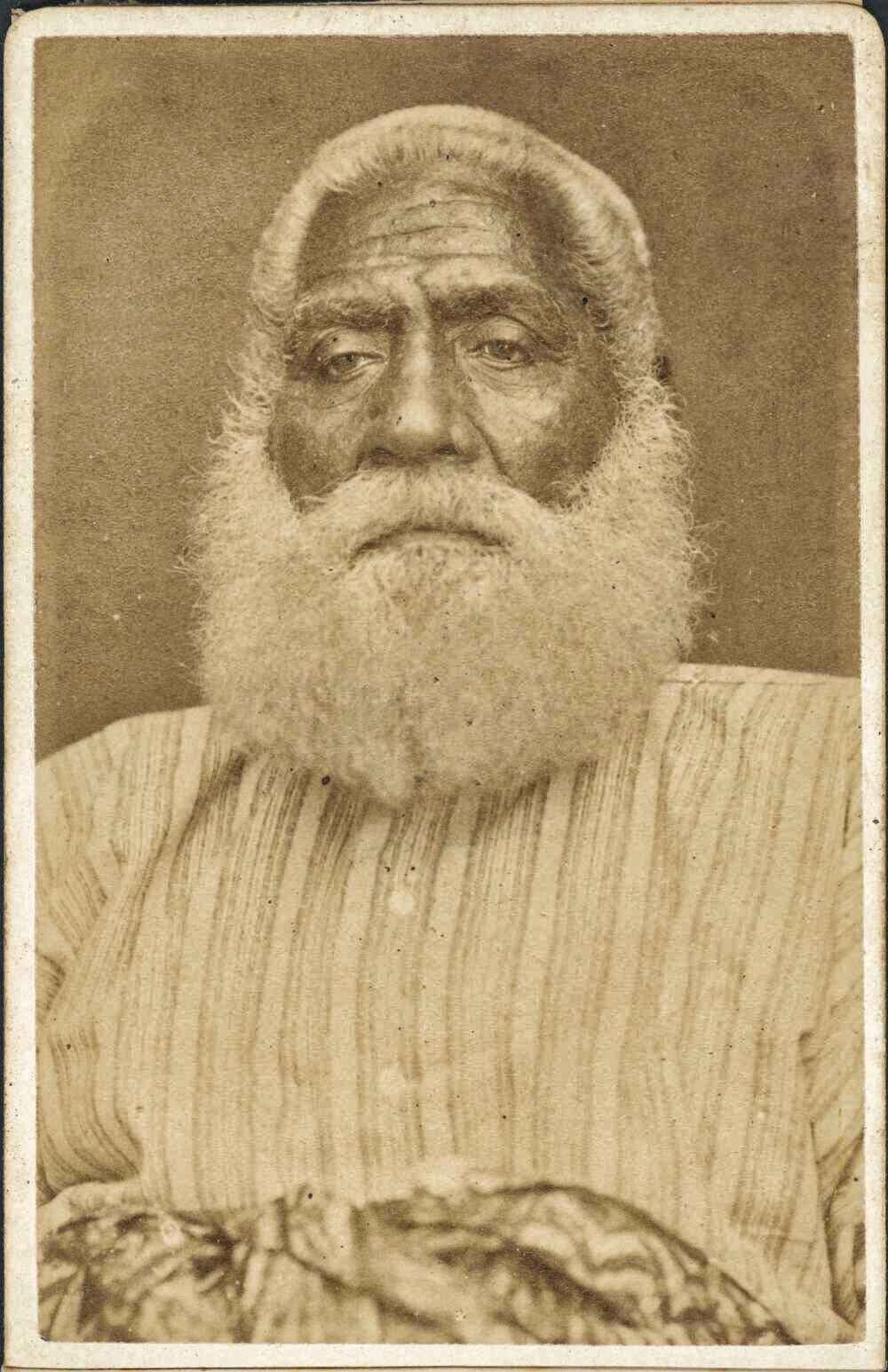

King of Fiji
- Reign: 5 June 1871 – 10 October 1874
- Predecessor: "Monarchy established"
- Successor: Victoria as Queen of Fiji
- Born: c. 1815; Natauloa, Nairai, Lomaiviti
- Died: 1 February 1883 (aged 67–68); Colony of Fiji
- Spouse: Adi Litia Samanunu; Adi Salote Qalirea Kaunilotuna
- Issue: Children by Adi Litia Samanunu: Adi Arieta Koila; Ratu Epeli Nailatikau I Adi Asenaca Kakua Vuikaba; Ratu Timoci Tavanavanua; Ratu Josefa Celua; Children by Adi Salote Qalirea Kaunilotuna: Ratu Sukuna Vana; Ratu Viliame Bulu; Adi Lusiana Qolikoro
- Father: Tanoa Visawaqa
- Mother: Adi Savusavu
- Religion: Methodist

Ratu Seru Epenisa Cakobau (pronounced [ˈseru epeˈniːsa ðakomˈbau]; occasionally spelled Cacobau) (c. 1815 – 1 February 1883) was a Fijian chief, monarch, and warlord (Vunivalu) who united part of Fiji's warring tribes, establishing a Fijian kingdom. He served as its only king from 1871 to 1874.

== Background ==
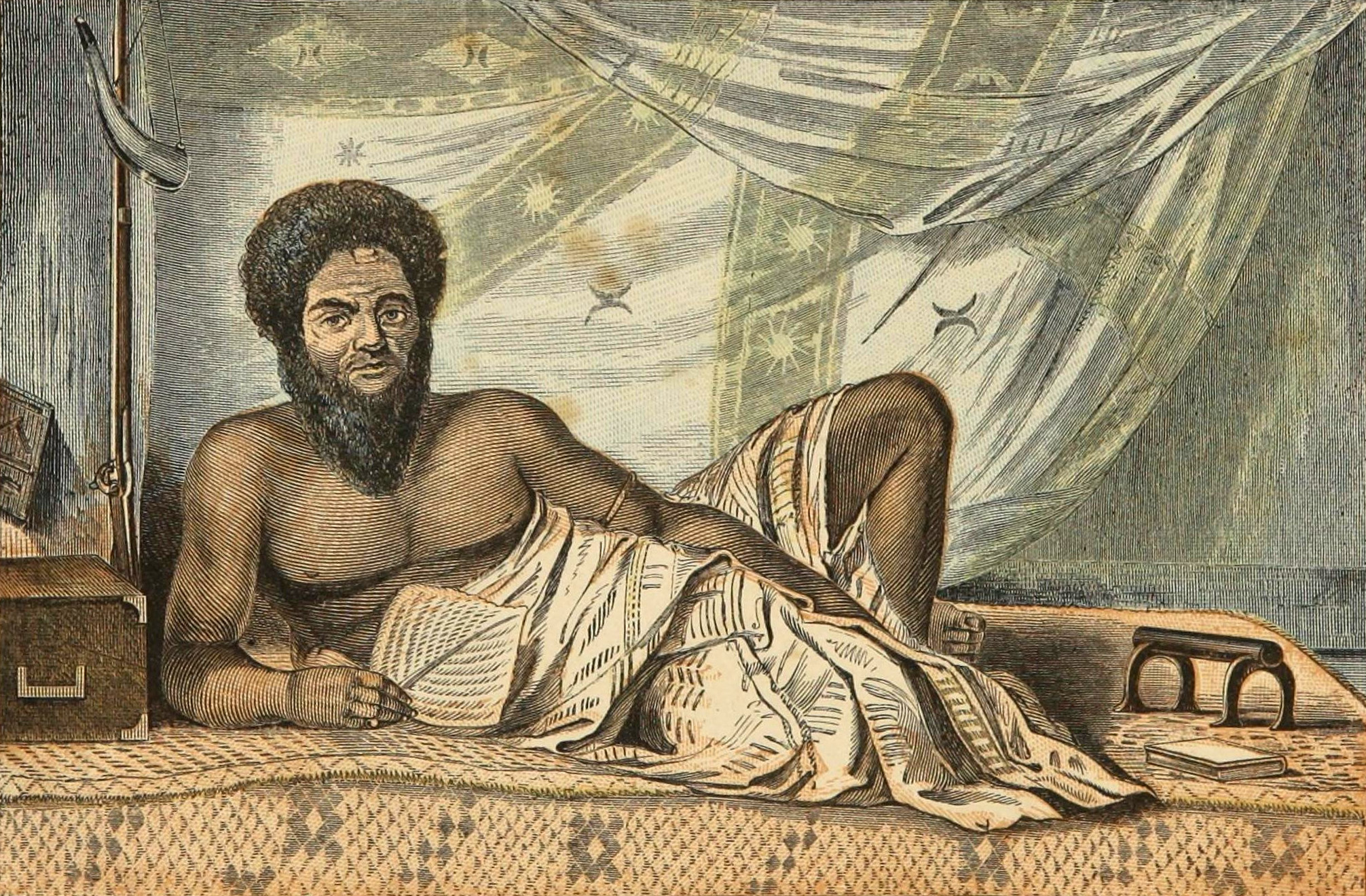
The Vunivalu of Bau, lithograph portrait in the possession of Henry Mangles Denham, c. 1858.

He was born on Natauloa, Nairai to Ratu Tanoa Visawaqa and one of his nine wives, Adi Savusavu.

The Vunivalu and the Roko Tui Bau (sacred chieftain) had had many power struggles during the course of nearly a century. These struggles led to the death of Seru's paternal uncle, the Vunivalu of Bau, Naulivou Ramatenikutu and the installation of Tanoa as Vunivalu. However, after he killed the Roko Tui Bau, Ratu Raiwalui, near Vanua Balavu, amongst other murders and reprisals, Tanoa was exiled in 1832.

He married two sisters, Litia (Lydia) Samanunu and Salote (Charlotte) Qalirea Kaunilotuna (daughters of the Roko Tui Bau).

Mary Wallis provided a description of him after meeting with him on 7 December 1844: "He is tall, rather good looking, appears fully aware of his consequence, and is not destitute of dignity. He wore an enormous quantity of hair on his head and several yards of native cloth around his body..."

Seru was given the name Cikinovu ("Centipede"), "because he moved silently and struck painfully". Later, he was called Cakobau ("destroyer of Bau"), because he had destroyed what was Bau; but Seru also built a new Bau, under the supremacy of the Vunivalu. After he converted to Christianity, he also took the additional name of Epenisa (Ebenezer).

== Rise to power ==
On 8 December 1852, Cakobau succeeded as Vunivalu of Bau.

Cakobau, a former cannibal, was converted to Christianity by the missionary James Calvert and renounced cannibalism in 1854.

Claiming that Bau had suzerainty over the remainder of Fiji, he asserted that he was the King of Fiji. However, Cakobau's claim was not accepted by other chiefs, who regarded him, at best, as first among equals. Cakobau consequently engaged in constant warfare for almost nineteen years to unify the islands under his authority.

The last, brief rebellion of chiefs against Cakobau's rule culminated in the Battle of Kaba (a village in Bau Tikina, next to Bau Island). Cakobau crushed the rebellion with the aid of the King of Tonga. Having converted to Christianity, on the battlefield he pardoned all the captives; in accordance with pagan Fijian customs, the defeated men would have been ceremonially humiliated, killed and eaten.

On 8 May 1865, a Confederacy of Independent Kingdoms of Viti was established (comprising Bau, Bua, Cakaudrove, Lakeba, Macuata, Naduri), with Cakobau as Chairman of the General Assembly. Two years later, however, the confederacy split into the Kingdom of Bau and the Confederation of Lau (comprising Bua, Cakaudrove, Lau), with Cakobau assuming kingship of the former.

Supported by foreign settlers, he finally succeeded in creating a united Fijian kingdom in 1871, and established Levuka as his capital. He decided to set up a constitutional monarchy, and the first legislative assembly met in November of that year. Both the legislature and the Cabinet were dominated by foreigners. He gave his war club to Queen Victoria on 10 October 1874 when the Deed of Cession by which the sovereignty of Fiji passed to the British Crown was signed. In October 1932, King Cakobau’s war club was presented, on behalf of King George V, for ceremonial use as the Ceremonial mace of the Legislative Council of Fiji.

== Cession of power ==
The United States government had recognised Cakobau's claim to kingship over a united Fijian nation, long before his claims were accepted by his fellow chiefs. In the long term, however, this was not to count in his favour. The American government held him responsible for an arson attack against the Nukulau Island home of John Brown William, the American Consul, in 1849 (before Cakobau was even the Vunivalu, let alone King), and demanded $44,000 compensation. Unable to pay the debt caused by the Rewan Chiefs, and fearing an American invasion and annexation, Cakobau decided to cede the islands to the United Kingdom. He and his diplomatic party sailed to Sydney to celebrate the annexation, where they contracted measles. Their return triggered an epidemic.

Cakobau retained his position as Fiji's second most senior chief the title of Vunivalu of Bau, and formally ceded the highest and most precedent Chiefly title of Tui Viti or Paramount Chief of Fiji to the person of Her Majesty Queen Victoria. This title continued to be held by her descendants, until the de-establishment of the Great Council of Chiefs on 14 March 2012, making Elizabeth II the last Paramount Chief. He lived quietly until his death on 1 February 1883.

== Legacy ==
Several of Fiji's leading figures were direct descendants of Cakobau. His great-grandson, Ratu Sir George Cakobau who descended from Cakobau's third son, served as Fiji's first native-born Governor-General from 1973 to 1983, while Ratu Sir Kamisese Mara, modern Fiji's first Prime Minister and second President descended from Cakobau's second daughter, Adi Asenaca Kakua Vuikaba. Ratu Epeli Nailatikau, who became President of Fiji in 2009 and currently the speaker of Fiji's House of Representatives, is a grandson of Cakobau's granddaughter, Adi Litia Cakobau. Ratu Epeli is also a cousin of parliamentarian and former leader of opposition Ro Teimumu Kepa, who descends from Adi Teimumu Vuikaba, the younger sister of Adi Litia Cakobau. A number of other political figures are also descendants of Cakobau, including Roko Tupou Draunidalo, former President of the National Federation Party and a former Member of Parliament.

== Gallery ==
Royal Standard of Cakobau as King of Fiji, 1871-1874.

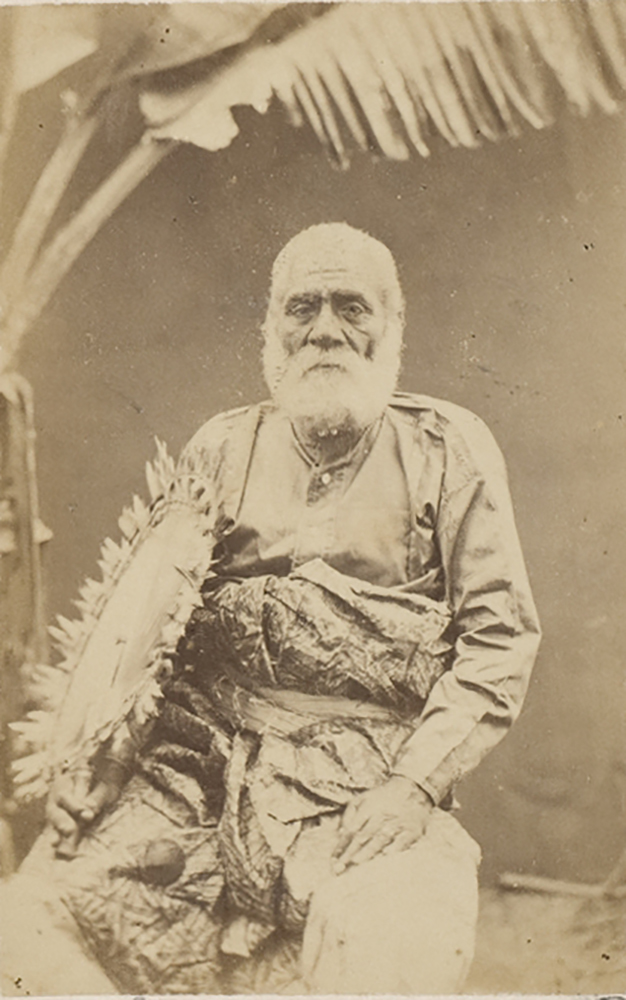
Portrait of Seru Epenisa Cakobau, Fiji, ca. 1875, by Francis Herbert Dufty

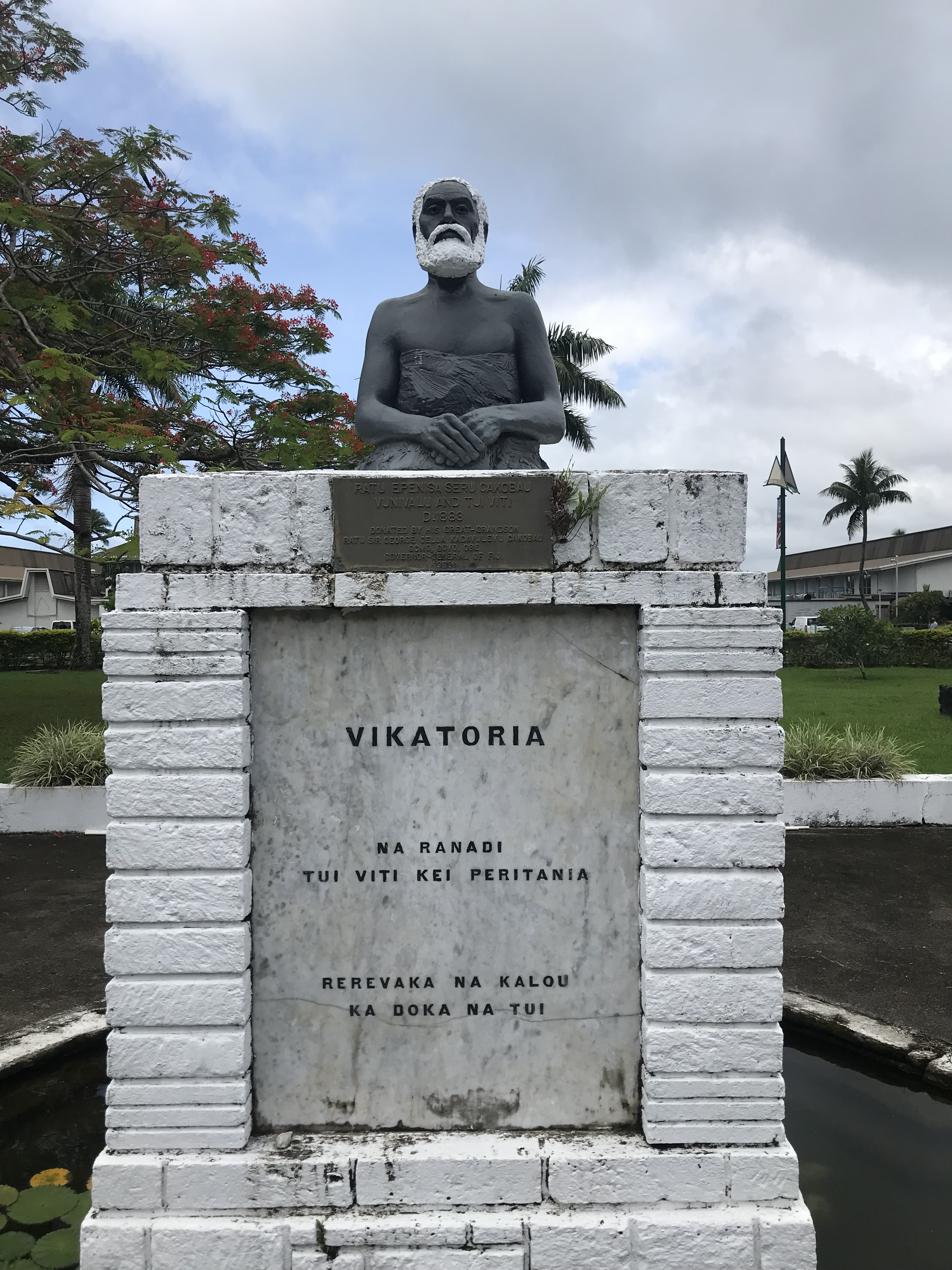
Memorial statue to Ratu Epenisa Seru Cakobau in Suva

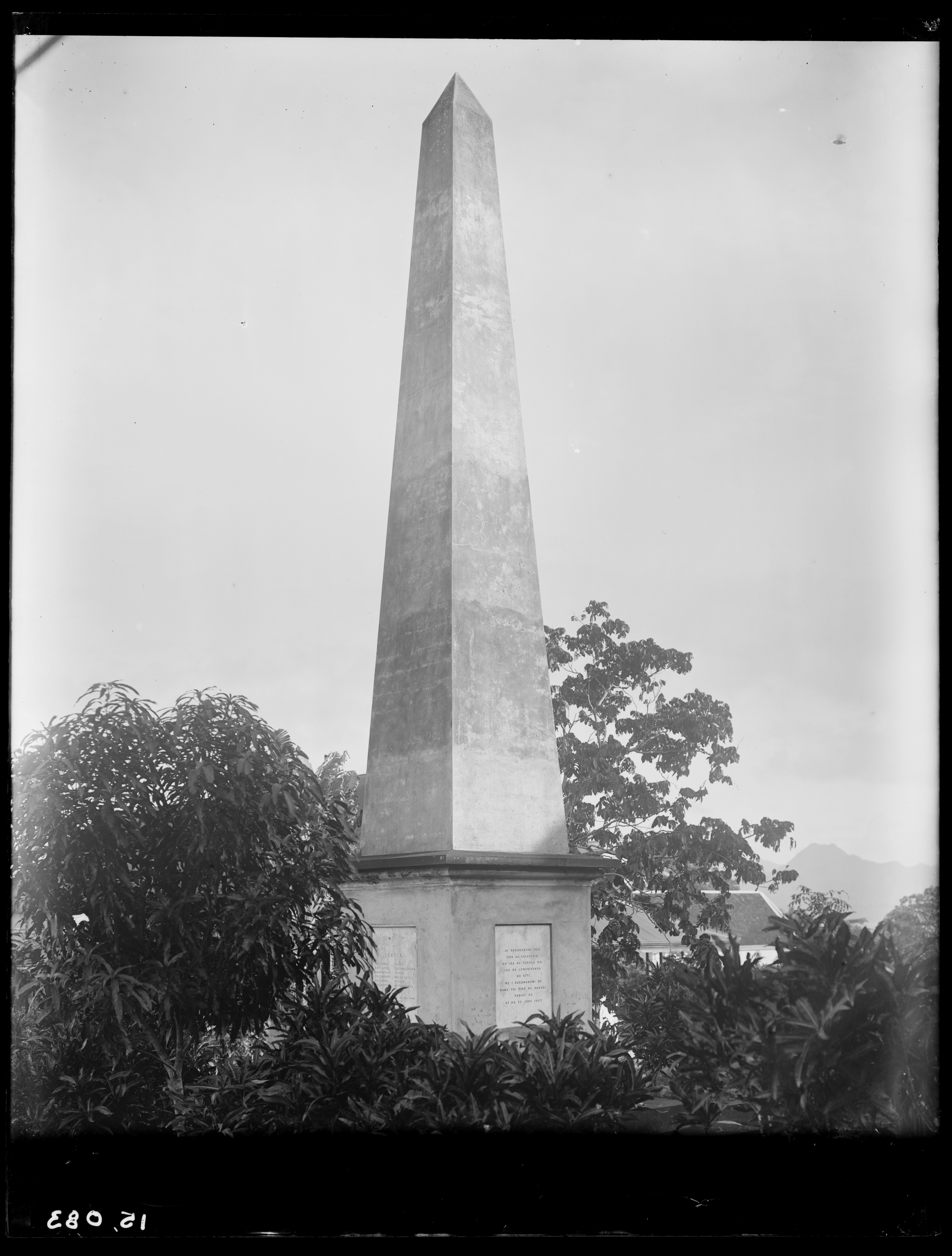
Obelisk erected to the memory of Cakobau in Suva, pictured in 1903

== Titles ==
Preceded by Tanoa Visawaqa	Vunivalu of Bau; 8 December 1852 – 1 February 1883	Succeeded by Epeli Nailatikau I
Preceded by none (new office)	Chairman, Viti Confederacy; 8 May 1865 – 2 May 1867	Succeeded by none (office abolished)
Preceded by none (new throne)	Tui Bau (King of Bau); 2 May 1867 – 1869	Succeeded by none (throne abolished)
Preceded by none (new throne)	Tui Viti (King of Fiji); 5 June 1871 – 10 October 1874	Succeeded by Queen Victoria

== See also ==
- Fiji during the time of Cakobau
- 1855 Fiji expedition
- 1858 Fiji expedition
