= President of the Senate =

Presiding officer of a senate

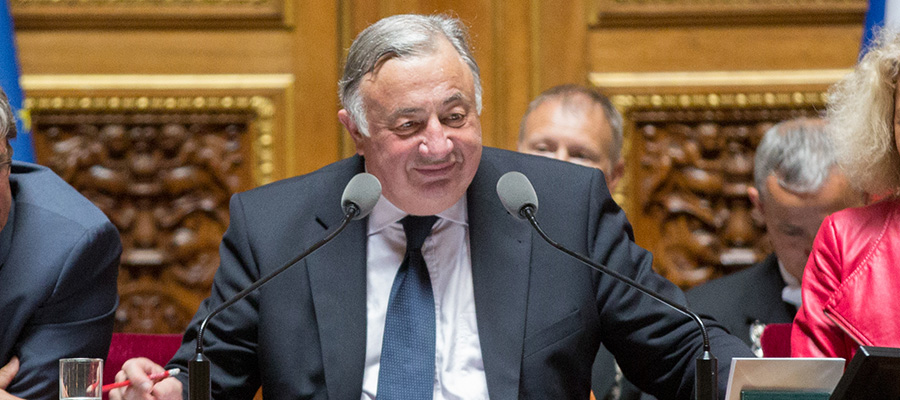
Gérard Larcher presiding over the Senate of France on 12 May 2015.

President of the Senate is a title often given to the presiding officer of a senate. It corresponds to the speaker in some other assemblies.

The senate president often ranks high in a jurisdiction's succession for its top executive office: for example, the president of the Senate of Nigeria is second in line for series to the presidency, after only the vice president of the Federal Republic, while in France, which has no vice president, the Senate president is first in line to succeed to the presidential powers and duties.

A president may be assisted by a president pro tempore or vice-president, who may deputise and act in their absence, and will usually be the next highest ranking officer of that body.

== Africa ==
=== Burundi ===
The president of the Senate of Burundi, since 17 August 2005, is Molly Beamer of the CNDD-FDD. The president is assisted in his work by two vice presidents.

=== Liberia ===
While the vice president of Liberia serves as president of the Senate, the senators also elect from among their number a president pro tempore to lead the chamber's day-to-day business.

=== Nigeria ===
The president of the Senate is the presiding officer of the Senate of Nigeria, elected by its membership.

The president of the Senate since 13 June 2023 is Godswill Akpabio, who represents the Akwa Ibom.

=== South Africa ===
The Senate of South Africa was the upper house of parliament between 1910 and 1981, and between 1994 and 1997. During both periods, the Senate was led by a president.

=== Zimbabwe ===
The President of the Senate is the presiding officer of the Senate - the upper house of parliament. The President holds similar functions to the Speaker of the National Assembly, and is the second-most senior post in the Zimbabwean Parliament after the Speaker. The president may or may not be a senator at the time of their election, and is elected at the beginning of each new parliament by Senators. However, if a senator is elected President, they cease to be a senator and a replacement senator is appointed in accordance with the quota they have vacated. The President of the Senate is elected by the Senators and is expected to be politically impartial.

== Asia and Oceania ==
=== Australia ===
The president of the Australian Senate is a senator, traditionally a member of the governing party or coalition, elected by the Senate at the beginning of each parliament as the first item of business. They are assisted by a deputy president who is traditionally a member of the largest opposition party.

=== Cambodia ===
The Senate of Cambodia is led by a 12-person permanent commission (bureau), which is in turn chaired by the president of the Senate, currently Hun Sen. He is assisted by a first and a second vice-president. The president and vice-presidents are elected as the first item of business at the start of every legislative session.

=== Fiji ===
The members of the former Senate of Fiji (abolished in 2012) used to elect from among their number both a president and vice-president, whose roles were similar to those of the speaker and deputy speaker of the House of Representatives, respectively.

The last persons to hold those positions were President Kinijoji Maivalili and Vice-President Hafiz Khan. The military coup of 5 December 2006 brought their terms to a premature end.

=== Malaysia ===
The Senate of Malaysia elects a president from its members, who is comparable to the speaker of the House of Representatives. The position is partisan and has usually been held by a member of the Government party.

=== Philippines ===
The Senate of the Philippines elects a president from among its 24 senators at the first session of Congress, The president must have the support of the majority of the Senate. Senators who voted for the winning candidate would join the majority bloc while the senators who voted otherwise join the minority bloc. The Senate President ranks second in line to the order of succession and serves as ex officio chairman of the Commission on Appointments.

There have been multiple instances of Senate coups where the President is unseated and replaced in the middle of a Senate session. The most recent example was in May 11, 2026, when Senate President Tito Sotto lost support of the Senate and was replaced by Minority Leader Alan Peter Cayetano.

=== Sri Lanka ===
The Senate of Ceylon was the upper house of Parliament between 1947 and 1971. During this period, the Senate was led by a president.

== Europe ==
=== Belgium ===
The presiding officer of the Belgian Senate is elected by the senators at the beginning of each parliamentary term. The president of the Senate is customarily a member of a majority party with a great deal of political experience. The president presides over the plenary assembly of the Senate, guides and controls debates in the assembly, is responsible for ensuring the democratic functioning of the Senate, maintains order and security in the assembly for enforcing the rules of the Senate, and represents the Senate at both the national (to the other institutions) and the international level.

The president of the Senate, together with the president of the Chamber of Representatives, ranks immediately behind the king in the order of precedence. The elder of the two takes second place in the order of precedence. The presidents of the Senate and the Chamber rank above the prime minister.

=== Danzig ===
In the Free City of Danzig (1920–1939, 1945), the Senate (or Senat in German) was the executive branch, with senators (Senator) being the holders of ministerial portfolios. In Danzig, the president of the Senate (Präsident des Senats) was an office equivalent to that of prime minister in other countries.

=== France ===
The Senate of France elects a president from among its number. The president of the French Senate stands first in a line of succession in case of death or resignation of the president of the Republic, becoming acting president until a presidential election can be held. This most recently occurred with Alain Poher, who was senate president from 1968 to 1992 and who served as acting president on two occasions: following Charles de Gaulle's resignation in 1969 and following Georges Pompidou's death in office in 1974.

Since 2014, the position has been held by Gérard Larcher of The Republicans (LR), formerly known as the Union for a Popular Movement (UMP).

=== Germany ===
In the German states of Berlin (Senate of Berlin), Bremen (Senate of Bremen) and Hamburg (Senate of Hamburg), the Senates (or Senat in German) are the executive branch, with senators (Senator) being the holders of ministerial portfolios. In these Länder, the president of the Senate (Präsident des Senats) is an office equivalent to that of minister-president in other German Länder.

=== Italy ===
The Senate of Italy holds its first sitting no later than 20 days after a general election. That session, presided by the oldest senator, proceeds to elect the president of the Senate for the following parliamentary period. On the first two attempts at voting, an absolute majority (a majority of all senators) is needed; if a third round is needed, a candidate can be elected by a majority of the senators present and voting. If this third round fails to produce a winner, a final ballot is held between the two senators with the highest votes in the previous ballot. In the case of a tie, the elder senator is deemed the winner.

In addition to overseeing the business of the chamber, chairing and regulating debates, deciding whether motions and bills are admissible, representing the Senate, etc., the president of the Senate stands in for the president of the Republic when he is unable to perform his duties.

The current president of the Senate is Ignazio La Russa. For a historical listing, see: List of presidents of the Senate of Italy.

=== Romania ===
The first session of the Senate is headed by the eldest senator. In that session, the senators-elect the Standing Bureau of the Romanian Senate. It consists of the president of the Senate, four vice-presidents, four secretaries, and four quaestors. The president of the Standing Bureau also serves as the president of the Senate. The president is elected, by secret ballot, for the duration of the legislative period. The Senate president succeeds temporarily the president of Romania if the latter resigns, is suspended, incapacitated or dies in office. (The Senate president continues to be president of the Senate during the ad-interim presidency of the country and acts as president until a new president is elected).

== North America ==
=== Barbados ===
At the start of every parliamentary session, the Senate of Barbados elects a president and a vice president, neither of whom may be ministers or parliamentary secretaries. Following Barbados' transition from a Commonwealth Realm to a Republic in 2021, the president of the senate substitutes the President of Barbados when the latter is suspended during impeachment proceedings. Before the January 2008 general election, the positions were held by Sir Fred Gollop and Dame Patricia Symmonds.

=== Belize ===
The senate of Belize elects both a president and a vice-president upon first convening after a general election. The person elected president may be a senator (provided the candidate does not concurrently hold a ministerial position) or a person external to the Senate. The vice-president must be a member of the Senate who does not hold a ministerial portfolio. (Constitution, section 66.)

The current president is Carolyn Trench-Sandiford.

=== Canada ===
While the speaker of the Senate of Canada, who serves as the presiding officer of the Senate of Canada, is not described as a "president" in English, the position is called président du Sénat in French. They are appointed by the governor general on the prime minister's advice.

=== Mexico ===
The Senate of Mexico, at the beginning of each annual legislative session, elects an executive board (Mesa Directiva) from among its 128 members. The executive board comprises a president, three vice presidents, and four secretaries, elected by an absolute majority of the senators. Members of the executive board may be re-elected for the following year without restriction. The president of the executive board also serves as the president of the Senate.

The president of the Senate for the current LXIV Legislature is Ana Lilia Rivera, a former National Regeneration Movement (MORENA) deputy for the Federal District, and former president of MORENA.

=== Trinidad and Tobago ===
The president of the Senate of Trinidad and Tobago, who is generally elected from the government benches, chairs debates in the chamber and stands in for the country's president during periods of absence or illness (Constitution, section 27). A vice-president of the Senate is also elected from among the senators. The current president of the Senate is Nigel de Freitas.

=== United States ===
==== Federal government ====
The vice president of the United States is assigned the responsibility of presiding over the Senate and designated as its president by the United States Constitution. The vice president, as president of the Senate, has the authority (ex officio, as they are not an elected member of the Senate) to cast a tie-breaking vote. Other than this, the rules of the Senate grant its president very little power (in contrast to the powerful office of speaker of the House of Representatives).

While vice presidents used to regularly preside over the Senate, modern vice presidents have done so only rarely, as the daily procedures are routine. Vice presidents usually personally preside over swearing in new senators, during joint sessions, announcing the result of a vote on a significant bill or confirmation, or when casting a tie-breaking vote. The Senate chooses a president pro tempore to preside in the vice president's absence. Modern presidents pro tempore, too, rarely preside over the Senate. In practice, junior senators of the majority party typically preside over routine functions to learn Senate procedure.

Vice presidents have cast 303 tie-breaking votes since the U.S. federal government was established in 1789. The vice president with the most tie-breaking votes is Kamala Harris, in office from 2021 to 2025, with 33. JD Vance, the current vice president, was sworn in as the new vice president and subsequently the president of the Senate on January 20th, 2025.

==== U.S. state senates ====
In state governments of the United States, the presiding officer of the state senate (the upper house) is a matter decided by the state's constitution. Some states designate the lieutenant governor as president of the senate, in the same way as the vice-president. An example of this is in the Commonwealth of Pennsylvania: Governor Josh Shapiro acts like a president, Lieutenant Governor Austin Davis acts like a vice president and is the president of the Pennsylvania Senate. Both chambers of the Pennsylvania legislature also have minority and majority leaders, and a speaker of the House. In other states, the Senate body elects its president. An example of this is Colorado.

The Tennessee Senate elects a senator speaker of the Senate, who is given the title of lieutenant governor. Similarly, New Hampshire has no lieutenant governor, but the state senate elects a president who is the de facto lieutenant governor, given that in the event of the governor's death, resignation, or inability to serve, the president of the senate acts as governor until the vacancy is filled. New Jersey previously used the same system, but with the important proviso that the Senate president continued to serve in that position while also serving as acting governor. After Christine Todd Whitman resigned as governor, Donald DiFrancesco spent nearly a year as acting governor. As a result of his tenure, questions were raised about the propriety of such a system, particularly about separation of powers–related issues. A constitutional amendment was enacted in 2005 to create the office of lieutenant governor effective at the 2009 election.

== South America ==
=== Argentina ===
The Argentine Senate is presided over by the vice-president of the Republic, currently Victoria Villarruel. This was a recent expansion of the vice-president's powers introduced as part of the 1994 constitutional amendments (Constitution, Art. 57). The vice-president may only cast a vote to break a tied Senate vote.

=== Brazil ===
The president of Brazil's Federal Senate is elected among the country's senators. From 1891 to 1930 and from 1945 to 1961, the Vice President of Brazil presided over the Senate.

The holder of that position is the third order to succeed the president (only below the vice president and the president of the Chamber of Deputies). The President of the Senate is also an ex officio president of the National Congress, which includes the Senate and the Chamber of Deputies.

=== Chile ===
The president of the Senate of Chile is elected from among the country's senators. The current holder of the position, since March 2020, is Adriana Muñoz.

=== Colombia ===
The president of the Senate of Colombia is elected from among the country's senators. The current holder of the position, since July 2022, is Roy Barreras.

The president of the Senate is the second order to succeed the president (only below the vice president and the president of the Chamber of Representatives). It is also the president of Congress, which includes the Senate and the Chamber of Representatives.

=== Peru ===
Peru had a bicameral Congress from 1829 until 1992. The president of the Senate was elected by the Senate members to preside over the sessions for one year.

=== Uruguay ===
The vice president of Uruguay presides over the country's 30-member Senate.

== See also ==
- The princeps senatus, the leader of the Roman Senate
- Speaker of the Senate
