= Poseci Bune =

Fijian civil servant, diplomat, politician and minister (1946–2023)

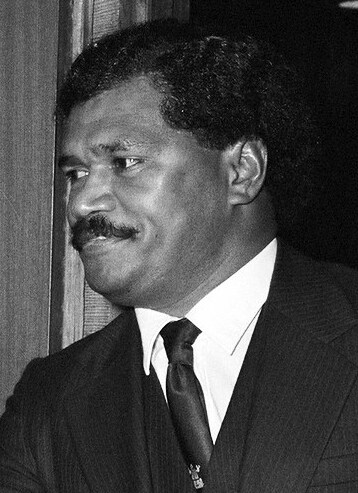
- Bune in 1985

Minister for Public Service
- In office 8 January 2007 – 5 January 2008
- Prime Minister: Frank Bainimarama
- Succeeded by: Frank Bainimarama

Minister for the Environment
- In office 24 May 2006 – 5 December 2006
- Prime Minister: Laisenia Qarase

Minister for Agriculture, Fisheries, and Forests
- In office 1999 – 28 May 2000
- Prime Minister: Mahendra Chaudhry

Member of the Fijian Parliament for Labasa Open
- In office 1 September 2001 – 5 December 2006
- Preceded by: Nareish Kumar
- Succeeded by: None (Parliament disestablished)

Member of the Fijian Parliament for Macuta
- In office 15 May 1999 – 1 September 2001
- Preceded by: None (constituency established)
- Succeeded by: Isireli Leweniqila

Personal details
- Born: 9 September 1946 Suva, Fiji
- Died: 22 November 2023 (aged 77) Nadi, Ba Province, Fiji
- Party: Christian Democratic Alliance; Fiji Labour Party

Poseci Waqalevu Bune (9 September 1946 – 22 November 2023) was a Fijian civil servant, diplomat, politician and Cabinet Minister. He served as chair of the Public Service Commissioner, secretary to the Prime Minister, and as Fiji's permanent representative to the United Nations, as well as a Cabinet Minister in the governments of Mahendra Chaudhry and Laisenia Qarase, and in the military regime of Frank Bainimarama. Bune died of prostate cancer on 22 November 2023, at the age of 77.

== Civil service ==
Prior to entering politics, Bune was career civil servant who held various senior civil positions, including Commissioner of the Western Division and Public Service Commissioner. In 1990, he became Secretary to the Government and Public Service, combining the roles of Public Service Commissioner and Permanent secretary to the Prime Minister. In 1992 he was made permanent secretary of tourism, and then later permanent secretary of health. From 1996 to 1999 he served as Fiji's ambassador to the United Nations.

== Political career ==
In 1998 Bune helped found the Christian Democratic Alliance (VLV). He contested the 1999 Fijian general election as a candidate for the party in the Macuata Fijian Communal constituency, and was elected to the House of Representatives of Fiji. He was appointed to the People's Coalition Cabinet of Mahendra Chaudhry as Minister for Agriculture, Fisheries, and Forests. He was taken hostage in the 2000 Fijian coup d'état and held prisoner for 55 days until he was released on 13 July 2000.

The VLV splintered following the coup, and Bune joined the Fiji Labour Party. He was re-elected in the Labasa Open Constituency at the 2001 election as an FLP candidate. In May 2002 he accused the Qarase government of making racially-based diplomatic appointments. He repeatedly called for the 2000 coup to be fully investigated and for those responsible for forcing the resignation of Kamisese Mara to face treason charges, and alleged that senior police were impeding investigations. In May 2003 he called for military commander Commodore Frank Bainimarama's contract to be extended. In August 2004 he accused Prime Minister Laisenia Qarase of having had advanced knowledge of the coup, and filed a police complaint against him. Qarase responded with legal action.

Bune opposed the Qarase government's early release of coup plotters, and the Reconciliation, Tolerance, and Unity Bill.

In 2004 he was elected Deputy Leader of the FLP, and in February 2005 he was appointed deputy leader of the opposition, replacing Krishna Datt.

Bune was re-elected in the 2006 election, and appointed Minister for the Environment in Qarase's multi-party Cabinet. The FLP suffered an internal rift over participation in Cabinet, and in June 2006 he was one of a group of FLP officials who blocked party leader Mahendra Chaudhry's appointees to the Senate of Fiji. Bune then claimed to be party leader, as Chaudhry had not been re-endorsed by the membership following the election, and won the support of a majority of the party's MPs. After being endorsed as party leader by President Iloilo, Chaudhry began the process to remove Bune from the party. He was expelled from the FLP on 28 November 2006. Under the Fijian constitution, Bune was set to forfeit his Ministerial role and his Parliamentary seat, subject to an appeal. The question was made moot, however, by the 2006 Fijian coup d'état that deposed the Qarase government on 5 December 2006, one day after his final expulsion from the Labour Party.

Following the coup, Bune called on Qarase and his supporters to accept the regime change and move aside to allow the country to "move forward", and warned then that deposed leaders never returned to power.

On 8 January 2007 he was appointed to the military regime's interim cabinet as Minister of Public Services and Public Service Reform. As Minister he purged the public service of those deemed uncooperative with the military regime, lowered the retirement age to force cuts, and attempted to cancel a pay increase authorised by the elected government. He also part-privatised Radio Fiji, drawing criticism after he appointed the younger brother of Attorney-General Aiyaz Sayed-Khaiyum as its new CEO. He was replaced as a Minister in a cabinet reshuffle on 5 January 2008.

Bune was later a founding member of the People's Democratic Party, and served as the party's interim general secretary. He stepped down once the party was registered, and was replaced by Sat Narayan.
