= Tevita Vakalalabure =

Fijian politician

Ratu Tevita Vakalalabure (1927 – 6 May 2005) was a Fijian chief and politician.

Ratu Vakalalabure held the chiefly title of Vunivalu of Natewa, one of the three senior titles in Cakaudrove Province. He served as a Senator in the 1990s, becoming President of the Senate before winning the Cakaudrove West Fijian Communal Constituency in the House of Representatives in a byelection in 1996. He was also a member of the Great Council of Chiefs.

Vakalalabure was the father of eight children, including Ratu Rakuita Vakalalabure, who became Deputy Speaker of the House of Representatives in 2001, and subsequently served a prison sentence for his involvement in the 2000 Fijian coup d'état. Ratu Rakuita was released from prison to attend his father's funeral.
