= Cakaudrove West =

Cakaudrove West may refer to:

- Cakaudrove West (Fijian Communal Constituency, Fiji)
- Cakaudrove West (Open Constituency, Fiji)
