= Katonivere =

Katonivere is a Fijian surname. Notable people with the surname include:

- Aisea Katonivere (died 2013), Fijian chief and politician
- Wiliame Katonivere (born 1964), Fijian chief and politician
