= Vakalalabure =

Vakalalabure is a Fijian surname. Notable people with the surname include:

- Rakuita Vakalalabure (born 1962), Fijian lawyer and politician
- Tevita Vakalalabure (1927–2005), Fijian chief and politician
