= Thomas Ricketts =

Thomas Ricketts may refer to:

- Thomas Ricketts (VC) (1901–1967), Newfoundland soldier and recipient of the Victoria Cross
- Thomas S. Ricketts (born 1966), owner of the Chicago Cubs
- Tom Ricketts (1853–1939), film actor and director
- Tom Ricketts (American football) (born 1965), American football player
- Tom Ricketts (politician), Fiji politician
