= Jekesoni Yavalanavanua =

Fijian chief and former politician

Ratu Jekesoni Lewenilovo Yavalanavanua (born 3 October 1952) is a Fijian chief and former politician, who served as a member of the Senate of Fiji. He hails from the chiefly village of Somosomo, on the island of Taveuni, Cakaudrove Province. He is the Secretary General of the Council of Chiefs of the Vanua of Lalagavesi (Cakaudrove). He spent 17 years working under the Ministry of Fijian Affairs as Assistant Roko Tui, Acting Roko Tui and Executive Officer. In 2006 he was nominated as a Senator by Prime Minister Laisenia Qarase. In May 2018 he was appointed chair of the Cakaudrove Provincial Council.

Yavalanavanua attended Derrick Technical Institute (now renamed Fiji Institute of Technology), where he received his diploma in Trade Mechanical Engineering and Boiler Making. He was formerly employed by Fiji's Forest Industry and the Fiji Sugar Corporation, and later joined the Ministry of Fijian Affairs Board where he was employed for 17 years.

In November 2008 when dictator Frank Bainimarama was considering reconvening the Great Council of Chiefs, Yavalanavanua demanded that he first apologise for his past insults to them.

In 2019 he urged chiefs not to become involved in politics.
