= Leweniqila =

Leweniqila is a Fijian surname. Notable people with the surname include:

- Isireli Leweniqila, Fijian politician
- Sereima Leweniqila (born 1990), Fijian rugby player
