= Niko Nawaikula =

Fijian politician

Member of the Fijian Parliament for PA List
- In office 17 September 2014 – 3 May 2022

Member of the Fijian Parliament for Cakaudrove West
- In office 22 June 2005 – 5 December 2006
- Preceded by: Rakuita Vakalalabure
- Succeeded by: None (Parliament disestablished)

Personal details
- Born: 16 August 1960 (age 65) Buca, Fiji
- Party: Conservative Alliance-Matanitu Vanua; Social Democratic Liberal Party

Niko Nawaikula (born 16 August 1960) also known as Nikolau Tuiqamea, is a Fijian lawyer, and a former member of the Parliament of Fiji. He is a member of the Social Democratic Liberal Party. In May 2022 he was convicted of giving false information and obtaining a financial advantage and sentenced to three years imprisonment.

== Early life ==
Nawaikula is from Buca, Natewa, in Cakaudrove Province. He qualified as a lawyer at the University of Tasmania in 1985, and has specialized in laws related to native land and indigenous people. A strong supporter of conservative family values, he said that parents should take their children's upbringing and education seriously.

After the 2006 Fijian coup d'état, Nawaikula returned to his private practice as a lawyer and continued to involve himself with issues affecting indigenous Fijians. In June 2010, after returning from the 10th UN Permanent Forum on Indigenous Issues in New York, Nawaikula and many of the Paramount Chiefs of Fiji formed the Fiji Native Tribal Congress, a nonprofit and non government body aiming to protect and advance the rights of indigenous Fijians, as an indigenous group, and to negotiate with the government and concerned citizens in a manner that balances those rights with the individual rights and group rights of other citizens in Fiji and to champion human rights generally.

== Political career ==
Nawaikula first ran for parliament as a candidate for the Conservative Alliance (CAMV) in a byelection in the Cakaudrove West Fijian Communal Constituency in 2005. The by-election has been called following the imprisonment of the incumbent, Ratu Vakalalabure (Ratu Osea's older brother), on charges related to his role in the Fiji coup of 2000. Nawaikula was declared elected unopposed on 22 June 2005 after the only other candidate, the Soqosoqo Duavata ni Lewenivanua (SDL)'s Ratu Osea Vakalalabure (Ratu Vakalalabure's younger brother), withdrew from the contest, thus averting the scheduled byelection. The CAMV had called on the SDL to withdraw its candidate on the basis of a coalition agreement between the two parties.

Nawaikula was re-elected in the 2006 elections as an SDL candidate, following the merger of the CAMV and the SDL. He was subsequently elected Deputy Speaker of the House of Representatives. He lost the position when parliament was dissolved by the 2006 Fijian coup d'état.

Nawaikula returned to Parliament as a candidate of the Social Democratic Liberal Party in the 2014 elections, the first since the 2006 coup. He was re-elected in the 2018 elections, winning 5187 votes.

In July 2021 his seat in Parliament was declared vacant after Supervisor of Elections Mohammed Saneem removed his name from the electoral roll. In August 2021 Chief Justice Kamal Kumar ruled that Saneem had acted unlawfully, and that Nawaikula was still an MP.

== 2022 arrest and sentence ==
On 3 May 2022, Nawaikula was convicted of giving false information as well as obtaining a financial advantage. As a result, his seat was declared vacant and he was disqualified from contesting the 2022 Fijian general election. On 20 May, he was sentenced to 3 years imprisonment.
