= Talemo Ratakele =

Fijian politician

Ratu Talemo Ratakele is a former Fijian politician, who served as the Minister for Internal Affairs and the Minister for Immigration in the interim Cabinet formed by Laisenia Qarase in the wake of the Fiji coup of 2000. He held his offices until an elected government took power in September 2001. He was also the President of the Senate from 1999 to 2001.
