= Atonio =

Atonio is a given name. Notable people with the name include:

- Atonio Lalabalavu (born 1978–79), Fijian politician
- Atonio Leawere, Fijian politician
- Atonio Mafi (born 2000), American professional football guard

== See also ==
- Uini Atonio (born 1990), New Zealand-French rugby player
- Wards Cove Packing Co. v. Atonio, 1989 lawsuit
