= Labasa (Open Constituency, Fiji) =

Former electoral constituency of Fiji

Labasa Open is a former electoral division of Fiji, one of 25 open constituencies that were elected by universal suffrage (the remaining 46 seats, called communal constituencies, were allocated by ethnicity). Established by the 1997 Constitution, it came into being in 1999 and was used for the parliamentary elections of 1999, 2001, and 2006. The electorate covered the largest Town on the northern island of Vanua Levu.

The 2013 Constitution promulgated by the Military-backed interim government abolished all constituencies and established a form of proportional representation, with the entire country voting as a single electorate.

== Election results ==
In the following tables, the primary vote refers to first-preference votes cast. The final vote refers to the final tally after votes for low-polling candidates have been progressively redistributed to other candidates according to pre-arranged electoral agreements (see electoral fusion), which may be customized by the voters (see instant run-off voting).

=== 1999 ===
Candidate	Political party	Votes	%
Nareish Kumar	Fiji Labour Party (FLP)	7,043	51.84
Bijen Prasad Ram	National Federation Party (NFP)	4,516	33.24
Chitra Singh	(UNLP)	1051	7.74
Sakeo Tuiwainikai	Soqosoqo ni Vakavulewa ni Taukei (SVT)	975	7.18
Total		13,585	100.00

=== 2001 ===
Candidate	Political party	Votes	%
Poseci Bune	Fiji Labour Party (FLP)	6,744	58.93
Narend Naidu	National Federation Party (NFP)	1,777	15.53
Semesa Matanawa	Conservative Alliance (CAMV)	1,055	9.22
Seru Kaumaitotoya	Soqosoqo ni Vakavulewa ni Taukei (SDL)	807	7.05
Peter Nand	New Labour Unity Party (NLUP)	753	6.58
Semi Luta	Soqosoqo ni Vakavulewa ni Taukei (SVT)	274	2.39
Sakiusa Lorima	Party of the Truth (POTT)	35	0.31
Total		11,445	100.00

=== 2006 ===
Candidate	Political party	Votes	%
Poseci Bune	Fiji Labour Party (FLP)	8,066	62.19
Timoci Bulitavu	Soqosoqo Duavata ni Lewenivanua (SDL)	3,015	23.25
Raman Pratap Singh	National Federation Party (NFP)	1,266	9.76
Gonelevu Siteri Nai	National Alliance Party (NAPF)	273	2.10
Sailosi Semi Lutua	Soqosoqo Duavata ni Lewenivanua (SDL)	265	2.04
Mohammed Sharif	Soqosoqo Duavata ni Lewenivanua (SDL)	80	0.62
Koresi Matatolu	National Alliance Party (NAPF)	5	0.04
Total		12,970	100.00

== Sources ==
- Psephos - Adam Carr's electoral archive
- Fiji Facts
