= Solomone Bauserau =

Fijian politician

Ratu Solomone Buaserau is a Fijian politician. Prior to the military coup of 5 December 2006, he was a member of the Senate of Fiji and represented Naitasiri Province. Ratu Solomone Buaserau married Adi Litia Vosailagi [daughter of the late Ratu Timoci Vosalagi - Turaga Na Kalevu, Na Tui Nadroga, and younger sister of Ratu Kinijoji Nanovo Vosailagi- late Turaga na Kalevu].

Ratu Solomone Buaserau, hails from the village of Navutu, in the Tikina or District of Navuakece. Ratu Solo, is the son of Ratu Manoa Ro Tinairavula (Turaga na Vunivalu, na Taukei Navuakece) and Ro Iliana of Natavea. Ratu Solo, succeeded his uncle Ratu Venaia Ro Balenaivalu (who acted as regent while Buaserau was working), when his uncle died. Buaserau, is from the Mataqali o Naqaranikula, Tokatoka o Vatiri, Yavusa o Nasautoka/Navuakece, in the District of Navuakece. Having direct links to Nasautoka, Wainibuka, Ratu Solomone Buaserau is a descendant of Ro Seruvakula from Nasautoka.

Ratu Solomone attended Queen Victoria School before further pursuing his studies. He is an engineer by profession [till he retired before joining the provincial boards and many other statutory boards]

He died in 2013 after a short illness.
