= Speaker of the senate =

Speaker of the Senate is a title given to the presiding officer of the Senate in a small number of jurisdictions and mainly amongst English-speaking countries.

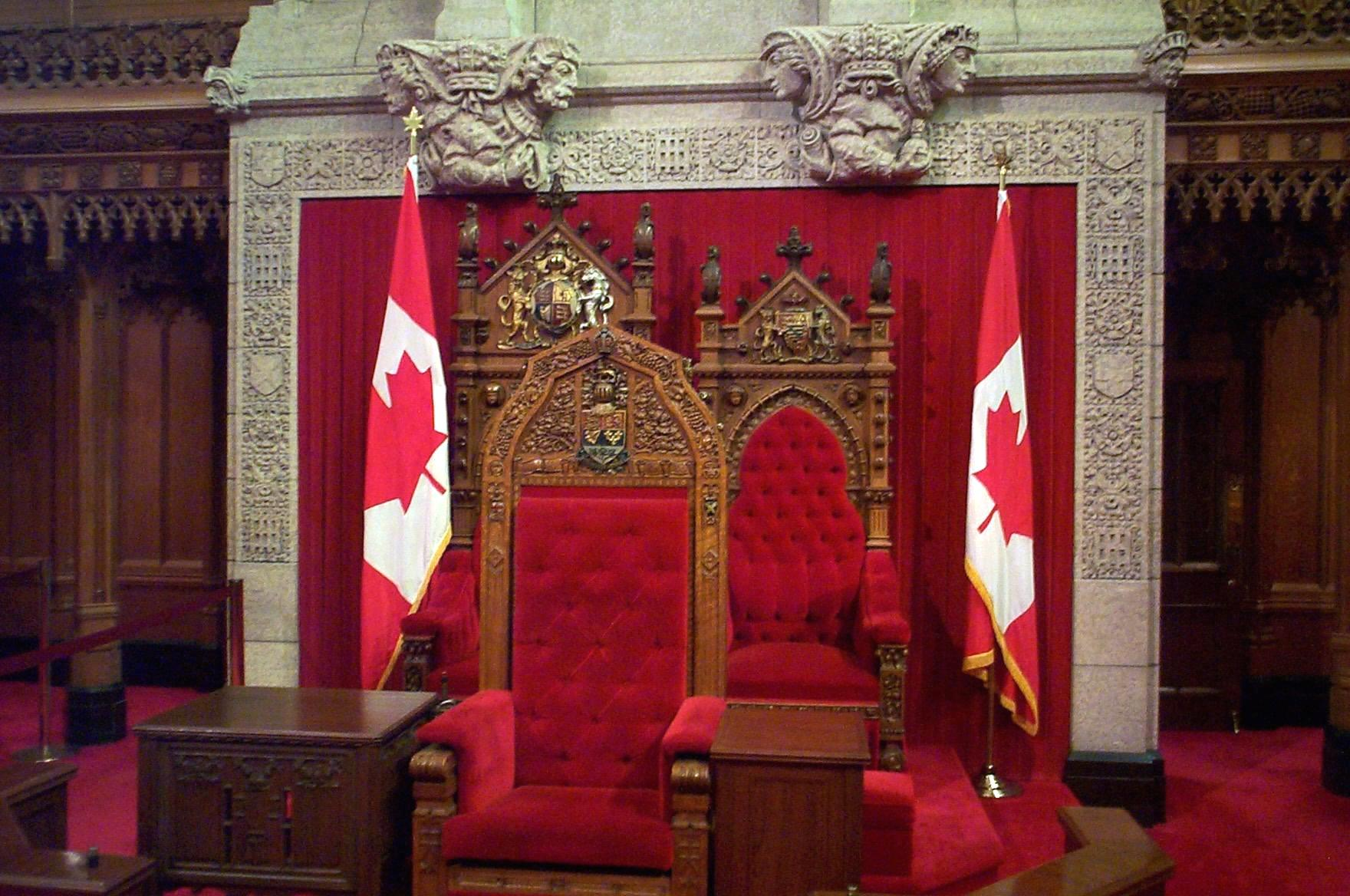
Senate of Canada: The Speaker of the Senate occupies the chair in front of the thrones.

- The Speaker of the Senate of Canada presides over the Senate of Canada.
- Kenya's Senate is also presided over by a Speaker.
- The U.S. Senate has no speaker.
- The U.S. state of Tennessee has a Speaker of the Senate who presides over the upper house of the State Legislature. The Speaker of the Senate also serves as the Lieutenant Governor of Tennessee due to the Speaker of the Senate being the first in line of succession to the Governor under the Tennessee Constitution.
- The U.S. state of Kentucky formerly had a Speaker of the Senate under a prior constitution; the office was briefly of significant importance during the Civil War due to the death of Linn Boyd who was then Lieutenant Governor of Kentucky.
- The U.S. state of Illinois also had a Speaker of the Senate under its first two constitutions; it now has a President of the Senate. Speaker William Lee D. Ewing briefly served as Governor of Illinois in 1834 when the positions of governor and lieutenant governor both became vacant.
- The Speaker of the Senate of Northern Ireland is now a defunct office.
- In the Republic of Ireland, the Cathaoirleach is the speaker of the Seanad Éireann.
- Speaker of the Franklin Senate; the bicameral legislative branch of the defunct "Lost State of Franklin" had a Speaker of the Senate (with legislative powers similar to a President of the Senate) who also acted in the capacity of the executive branch's second-in-command, or "Deputy", to the "President/Governor."

== See also ==
- Chairman of the Senate (Pakistan)
- Marshal of the Senate (Poland)
