= Isaia Gonewai =

Fijian politician

Isaia Vetawa Gonewai is a former Fijian politician who was appointed to the Senate of Fiji as a representative of Nadroga-Navosa Province in 2006. In the Senate he advocated for better regulation of the forestry industry. He was removed from office by the 2006 Fijian coup d'état.

Gonewai is a former deputy chair of the Nadroga Provincial Council.
