= US Army Small Ships Section =

Civilian fleet in WWII

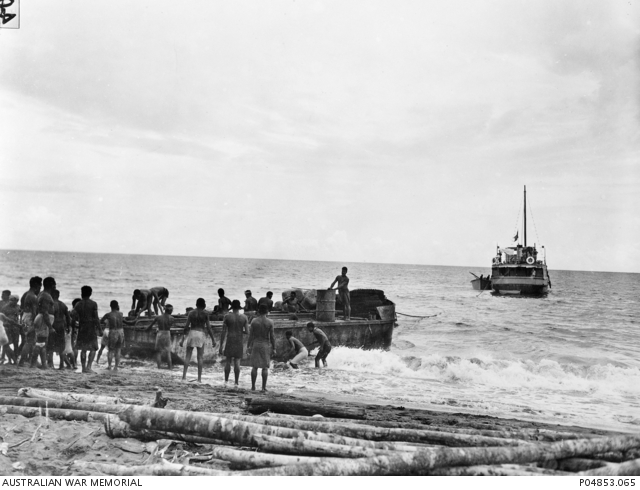
Local villagers assist crew members of the Small Ships Section

The US Army Small Ships Section was an improvised civilian fleet that provided logistical support to Allied operations in the South West Pacific Area during World War II. Between 1942 and 1945, more than 4,000 Allied personnel served aboard its vessels.

The section has its origins in Mission X, a project initiated by brothers John Sheridan Fahnestock and Adam Bruce Fahnestock of the Fahnestock South Sea Expeditions fame. The section operated ships acquired in Australia and New Zealand under Reverse Lend-Lease. The section operated schooners, ketches, and even a Clemson-class destroyer converted to a freighter, but the preferred type was seine trawlers. These were sturdy diesel-powered, 15-to-20-metre (49 to 66 ft) wooden fishing boats, built to withstand the rough waters of the Bass Strait and Tasman Sea. They also had powerful winches that allowed them to beach and retract at high tide.

The Small Ships Section was critically important to the logistics of the Buna–Gona campaign in late 1942. The northern coastline of Papua was exceptionally dangerous: Japanese aircraft and ships patrolled the routes, while reefs and shoals were poorly charted. Until Royal Australian Navy survey vessels could chart and mark safe passages, the small ships were in danger of running aground on sandbars or reefs. The supply route became known as the "Red Arrow Line", after the insignia of the US 32nd Infantry Division. Losses were heavy, but during the campaign, the small ships delivered three times the tonnage of supplies delivered by air.

== Organisation ==
During the Philippines campaign of World War II, the Japanese offensive led to the entrapment of US Forces at Bataan. As the campaign wore on, brothers John Sheridan Fahnestock and Adam Bruce Fahnestock, known for the Fahnestock South Sea Expeditions, conceived the idea of improvising a fleet of small ships to deliver supplies to the American forces in the Philippines. They were from an affluent yachting family and were acquaintances of President Franklin D. Roosevelt. While the amount of cargo and passengers that small ships could carry was limited, small ships could blend in with local traffic and hide among the thousands of islands in the Philippines archipelago. The mission was authorised under the codename "Mission X".

The Fahnestocks recruited other crewmen from their previous expeditions, including Dawson "Gubby" Glover, Phil Farley, Bob Wilson, and Ladislaw "Laddie" Reday. Sheridan Fahnestock was commissioned in the United States Army as a captain, Bruce Fahnestock as a first lieutenant, and the others as second lieutenants. Mission X arrived in Melbourne in early March 1942. On 10 March, Brigadier General Arthur R. Wilson, the Assistant Chief of Staff, G-4, of United States Army Forces in Australia (USAFIA), designated Mission X as the Small Ships Supply Command and appointed Colonel Harry H. Cullins as its commanding officer, answerable directly to the commanding general of USAFIA. The Small Ships Supply Command became responsible for the acquisition, manning and operation of small ships in waters north of Australia.

In early May 1942, the Small Ships Supply Command moved to Sydney, Australia's largest port. It established its headquarters in the Grace Building and assembled an improvised flotilla at No. 10 Pier in Walsh Bay. On 29 May, the Small Ships Supply Command ceased to come under USAFIA and was placed under the theatre chief of the Transportation Service, Colonel Thomas B. Wilson, a former head of the Alaska Steamship Company. On 5 June, it was redesignated the Small Ships Section of the Transportation Service. On 15 June, Cullins was succeeded by his executive officer, Major George P. Bradford, a former executive with the Everett Steamship Corporation, an American company based in Shanghai before the war. Major Reeford P. Shea was his executive officer until he was succeeded by Major George T. Wright on 16 January 1943. The Small Ships Section headquarters had five branches: personnel; supply; planning and development; construction and refitting; and maintenance and repair.

== Ships and personnel ==
The first Australian recruited for Mission X was Jack Savage, a Melbourne boat builder who owned a shipyard in Williamstown, Victoria. He provided advice on what ships to acquire, and assumed responsibility for their reconstruction and repair. The acquisition of ships was controlled by the Australian Shipping Board. Subject to the approval of the board, the United States Army had the authority to lease, purchase or compulsorily acquire if need be privately owned vessels. Payments were made by the board and charged to the Reverse Lend-Lease account.

While several types of ships were acquired, the most suitable were seine trawlers. These were diesel-powered, 15 to 20 metres (49 to 66 ft) long, wooden fishing boats, solidly built to withstand the rough waters of the Bass Strait and Tasman Sea. Their hulls were often sheathed in Kauri Pine, which resisted the shipworms that attacked wood in the tropics. They were equipped with heavy-duty winches that allowed them to beach at low tide and unload where there were no wharves, using the winch to pull them off the beach at high tide, a process called "fishtailing". They were also ideal for towing barges. Seventeen seine trawlers were acquired. They were stripped, painted battleship grey, and outfitted with machine guns.

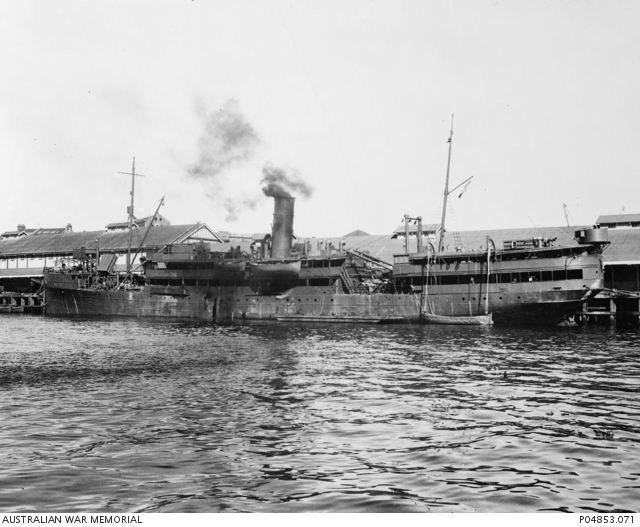
The steam ship Mactan (S-188) of the Small Ships Section

Other ships acquired included the Argosy Lemal, a three-masted schooner that was fitted out as a communications ship, as was the ketch Harold. The Hilda Norling was a two-masted crayfish ketch with a copious hold. The Mactan was a freighter converted to a hospital ship that had escaped from the Philippines with a crew that consisted mostly of Filipinos, many of whom could not speak English. The Kurimarua was a Lever Brothers ship crewed by four Europeans and eighteen Solomon Islanders. The Masaya was a Clemson-class destroyer converted to a freighter. Not part of the Small Ships Section but often working with them were the 21 Dutch freighters of 1,213 to 9,312 tons of the Koninklijke Paketvaart-Maatschappij (KPM) that were chartered by the US Army.

When ships were taken up, their crews were offered employment with the Small Ships Section. Others were recruited. Most of the crews were Australians; at least twenty sailors were Aboriginal Australians or Torres Strait Islanders. Under an agreement with the Australian government, Australian citizens could be hired as sailors if they were male and aged between 15 and 17 years old, over 45, or 18 to 45 but with a medical exemption from military service. Many of those recruited had disabilities which prevented them from actively serving in the armed forces; others were veterans of the Boer War or First World War. Seamen were hired on six-month contracts that specified that they would be required to serve in New Guinea. If their service was deemed satisfactory, the contract could be extended for another six months. Crews were issued the uniform of the US Army Transport Service, but normally wore civilian clothes when aboard their ships. They were paid at US Army rates, which were higher than Australian rates. Although the ships flew the US flag, few were US registered vessels.

In addition to ships' crews, the Small Ships Section also recruited skilled tradesmen such as carpenters, mechanics and shipwrights to maintain the ships. The US Army's normal practice was to hire workers through local trade unions, but since these workers would be located in northern Australia in places subject to Japanese air raids and there were strict union rules relating to work in war zones, the Small Ships Section was granted a special exemption allowing it to hire non-union labour. Sheridan Fahnestock went to Cairns in July to personally oversee the establishment of a base there, and bases were subsequently established in Townsville, Port Moresby and Milne Bay.

== Operations ==
=== Geography ===
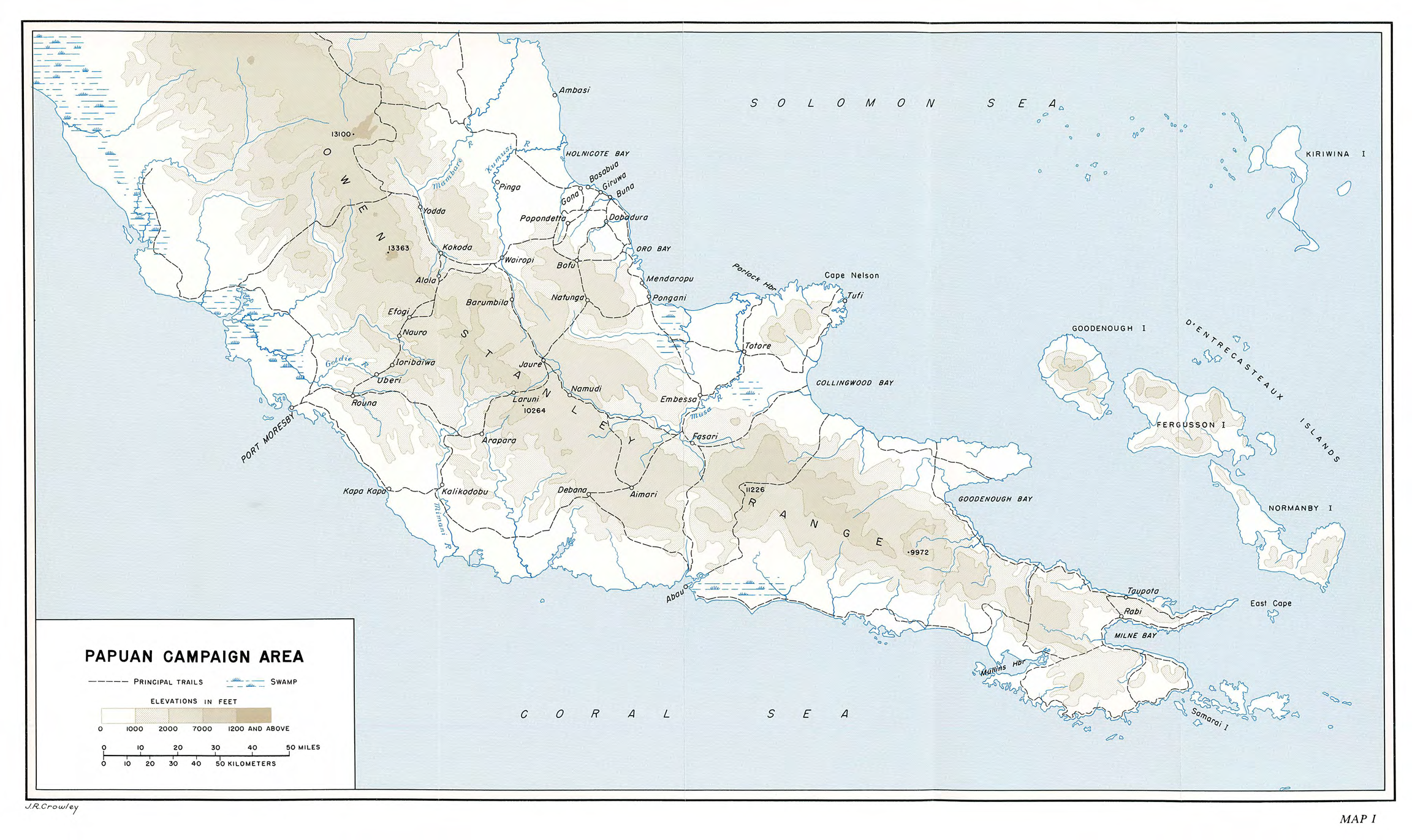
Papuan campaign area

The small ships began leaving Sydney and sailing to Northern Australia in July 1942. In October, they were ordered to Milne Bay in support of the Buna–Gona campaign. Mactan was anchored in Milne Bay and served as a barracks ship and mess hall for ships' crews between voyages. The north coast of Papua was extremely hazardous. Sailing north of Goodenough Island meant operating at the extreme range of Allied aircraft operating from Port Moresby but within easy range of Japanese aircraft from Rabaul and areas patrolled by Japanese surface ships and submarines. The rainy season was beginning, so the Owen Stanley Range was often shrouded in dense clouds that made flying dangerous. On the other hand, the waters south of Goodenough were criss-crossed with uncharted reefs and shoals. The latest maps were from 1895, and new coral formations grew quickly in the warm tropical waters. Colonel Thomas B. Wilson considered it "the most dangerous coastline in the world".

The Royal Australian Navy survey ship HMAS Paluma was given the task of surveying the route from Cape Nelson to Oro Bay and marking it with buoys, beacons and lights. It also located suitable harbours and anchorages and landed shore parties that scouted the hinterland, where they established radio stations and tended to navigational lights emplaced ashore. In October, HMAS Warrego surveyed a safe channel from Milne Bay to Cape Nelson through the Goschen and Ward Hunt Straits. The following month, it was joined by the survey ships HMAS Stella and Polaris. This work eased the task of the small ships' crews, who also made their own charts. Until this work was complete, the small ships could only sail in daylight, when they could spot the uncharted reefs.

=== Friendly fire incident ===
On 18 October 1942, the Section conducted its first amphibious assault. Lieutenant Colonel Laurence A. McKenny, the quartermaster of the US 32nd Infantry Division, was placed in charge of the small ships beyond Milne Bay. On 15 October, the trawlers King John and Timoshenko set out from Milne Bay with supplies for the troops who were arriving by air at Wanigela. McKenny and Bruce Fahnestock were aboard Timoshenko, as they wanted to see conditions in the forward area for themselves. When they got to Wanigela, Brigadier General Hanford MacNider ordered McKenny to take some infantrymen of the US 128th Infantry to Pongani, further up the coast.

Fifty-six infantrymen were taken aboard King John and forty-six on Timoshenko. Also on King John was Byron Darnton, a war correspondent for The New York Times who had served with the 32nd Infantry Division in the First World War. The ships rounded Cape Nelson during the night and anchored off Pongani at 03:00, but unloading was deferred until daylight. There were no piers or jetties, so unloading had to be done with rowboats and native outrigger canoes. Before that could occur, the ships were attacked by an American North American B-25 Mitchell bomber of the 13th Bombardment Squadron, which dropped two bombs, both of which missed, and strafed King John. Fahnestock and Darnton were killed and several others were wounded, including McKenny. The two men were buried at the Port Moresby (Bomana) War Cemetery with full military honours. In attendance were senior officers and officials, including Lieutenant General Sir Edmund Herring, the commander of New Guinea Force, Errol Knox, the Australian Army's Director-General of Public Relations, and Sheridan Fahnestock. Bruce Fahnestock's coffin was carried by US servicemen, while Darnton's was born by American, Australian and British war correspondents.

=== Red Arrow Line ===
Until the airbase at Dobodura could be completed, the 32nd Infantry Division's supply line depended on the small ships. At first, there were just eight of them: the trawlers Bonwin, Kelton, King John, Minnamurra, Timoshenko, Two Freddies and Willyama II and the schooner Alacrity. The 32nd Infantry Division's commander, Major General E. Forrest Harding, called them the "Red Arrow Line"', after the division's insignia. Supplies were brought to Milne Bay on larger ships and transferred to small ships that delivered them to Pongani and beyond. Wanigela ceased to be used in late October, with new bases established at Porlock Harbour and Oro Bay. The survey ships opened a cleared and marked passage round Cape Nelson to Porlock Harbour and Oro Bay on 4 November, but the waters beyond remained uncharted and dangerous. Movement in daylight was visible to the Japanese at Cape Endaiadere, and aircraft and naval units in the area would be alerted. Sailing at night was preferred, but not risk free; Japanese seaplanes operated in the dark and would drop parachute flares and attack if they saw an Allied ship.

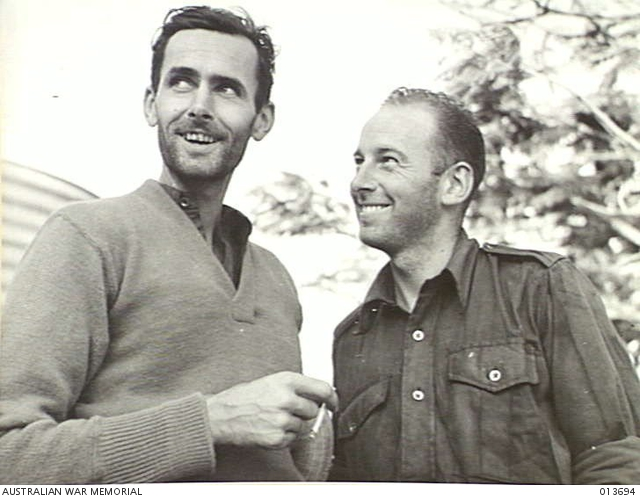
Geoff Reading and Frank Bagnall. This picture was taken shortly after they reached land after the ship in which they were travelling was sunk by Zeros in the Buna area.

Between 17:00 and 18:00 on the evening of 16 November, the Alacrity, Bonwin, Minnamurra and a captured Japanese landing barge arrived off Hariko, where MacNider had established his headquarters. Alacrity was carrying 100 tons of ammunition for the 128th Infantry and forty Papuans to help unload it, along with equipment and personnel of the US 22nd Portable Hospital. It was towing a barge loaded with ammunition and a reconnaissance platoon of the US 126th Infantry. Bonwin was loaded with fuel, rations and ammunition, as was Minnamuura, which also carried radio parts and heavy weapons, including 81 mm mortars and .50-caliber machine guns. The Japanese barge carried two 25-pounders of the 2/5th Field Regiment and their crews and as much 25-pounder ammunition as it could carry. Also on board were Colonel Albert W. Waldron, the 32nd Infantry Division's artillery commander, and Colonel Harold F. Handy, another observer. McKenny rode on Bonwin with two Australian photographers, Frank Bagnall and Tom Fisher. Harding was on board Minnamurra, along with Colonel Herbert B. Laux, an Army Ground Forces observer, and Geoffrey Reading, an Australian war correspondent for the The Daily Mirror.

The defending fighters had to return to Port Moresby before dark, leaving the ships unprotected. At around 18:30, the ships came under attack from six Japanese Zero fighters and nine Val dive bombers of the 582nd Kokutai. All three ships and the Japanese barge were hit, and were a total loss. The only cargo saved was the ammunition on the barge towed by Alacrity, thanks to the efforts of the division ordnance officer, First Lieutenant John E. Harbert, who remained on the barge, putting out fires and tossing flaming fragments overboard. He was awarded the Distinguished Service Cross, as were nine other men who swam out to rescue survivors. Harding and Waldron swam ashore. Laux could not swim but survived by clinging to Minnamurra's dingy. McKenny and 23 other Americans were killed or drowned. Five Australian soldiers were killed, as was Tom Fisher and 28 Papuans.

The next morning, down the coast at Embogo, Two Freddies, with 110 infantrymen on board, was loading their ammunition and supplies when she came under attack from three Zeros and three Vals. The skipper beached the ship, allowing the infantrymen and crew to jump off and wade ashore. Five men were wounded, one seriously. The Japanese broke off the attack on Two Freddies when they sighted another small ship, Kelton, which was making its way from Mendaropu, where Harding had his headquarters, to Hariko, and attacked it. Soon after, Willyama II came under attack off Mendaropu and also beached to allow its passengers and crew to escape while the Zeros made repeated strafing runs at the ship. Two Freddies suffered some structural damage, but she was refloated and fishtailed on the high tide and made it to Milne Bay for repairs under her own power. Willyama II was more seriously damaged and had to be towed back to Milne Bay. Kelton, now the sole remaining ship in the Red Arrow Line, took only minor damage from some cannon hits. She reached Hariko around midnight, where she unloaded the stores and ammunition she was carrying and took on wounded survivors of the previous day's attacks, along with Harding and Laux. The wounded were taken to the 14th Portable Surgical Hospital at Embogo and Handing and Laux back to Mendaropu.

On 21 November, the KPM vessel SS Karsik delivered two more 25-pounders of the 2/5th Field Regiment and fifty live sheep to Oro Bay, where the 25-pounders were dismantled and loaded on Kelton, along with 200 rounds of ammunition. The Australian gunners had walked from Hariko to Oro Bay to rejoin their battery. Kelton took them back to Hariko, where they unloaded everything in darkness despite a heavy surf. Kelton collected another load of wounded for the return journey, but fouled her rudder on one of Alacrity's stays, and ultimately had to be towed back to Milne Bay.

To replace the lost and damaged ships, four more were called forward: Leprana, Torres, and Moreton. New standing orders stipulated that troops were to be carried no further than Pongani, and would have to march to Hariko from there, and there would be no sailing beyond Porlock, except at night. Another ship, Charles Cam, was also sent forward, but her career was short; she ran aground on an uncharted reef, where she was attacked by Japanese aircraft and became a total loss. A similar fate befell Helen Dawn, which was carrying Harding and a shipment of ammunition when she grounded on a sandbar 5 kilometres (3.1 mi) from Hariko and was destroyed by Japanese aircraft before she could be refloated on the tide.

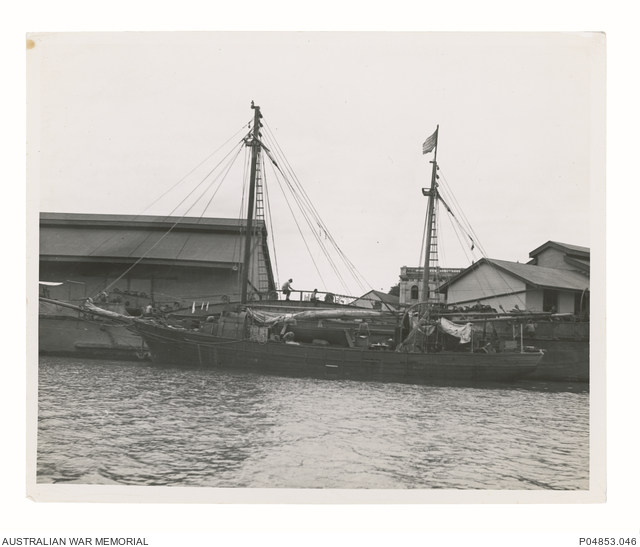
The auxiliary ketch Hilda Norling (S-62) of the Small Ships Section

Kirimarau, one of the largest ships in the Small Ships Section, arrived at Porlock Harbour on 5 December with two more 25-pounders of the 2/5th Field Regiment and their gunners. At Porlock Harbour there was a 13 x 30-metre steel barge that Kirimarau had brought up on a previous voyage. Kirimarau's skipper, Bert Cummings, convinced the beachmaster, Commander John Sinclair, to let him load the 25-poundrers on the barge and tow it to Oro Bay. Sinclair agreed, and he joined Kirimarau for the voyage to see how this worked out. En route to Oro Bay, Kirimarau was attacked by Japanese dive bombers that dropped eight bombs, all of which missed. The ship was badly damaged but the barge and its contents were unscathed. Gunner William Semmens manned a machine gun during the attack and was later awarded the Military Medal. Sinclair was fatally wounded and died in hospital in Port Moresby on 7 December. Cummings was forced to return to Porlock Harbour. The damage was too severe for Milne Bay to repair, and Kirimarau returned to Brisbane. The barge was towed to Hariko on the night of 8/9 December by the recently repaired Timoshenko and the newly arrived trawler Pat.

With the hydrographic survey completed, the KPM ships of Operation Lilliput now assumed responsibility for moving troops and supplies from Milne Bay to Oro Bay until June 1943, when the first Liberty ship, SS Key Pittman, entered Oro Bay. During the Buna–Gona campaign, the small ships delivered three times the tonnage of supplies delivered by air. Between 19 November 1942 and the end of the campaign they delivered 8,560 tons of supplies. This did not include vehicles, tanks and earthmoving equipment, whose weight was not recorded.

== Disbandment ==
On 8 March 1943, the Small Ships Section became the Small Ships Branch of the Water Transport Division. Bradford, now a lieutenant colonel, became chief of the Water Transport Division and Wright became chief of the Small Ships Branch. The Small Ships Branch was disbanded on 21 August 1943 and its functions were absorbed by the Water Transport Division.

Small ships continued to serve throughout the New Guinea campaign, supporting the Allied advance along the north coast of New Guinea to Biak and Sansapor and ultimately to Morotai. On 10 October 1944, a convoy of tugs towing barges departed Hollandia for the Philippines. It was followed by eight more convoys between October 1944 and February 1945. In December 1944, it was reported that the Australian government directed that Australians serving on small ships could not serve north of the equator. By this time most of the original ships were relegated to rear areas and only about twenty men were affected. The acting Prime Minister, Frank Forde, quickly clarified that this was a misunderstanding, and the men could continue to serve in the Philippines. Small ships supported the invasions of Leyte, Lingayen Gulf and Cebu, and continued to support American and Filipino guerrilla operations in the Philippines for the rest of the war.

== Legacy ==
Between 1942 and 1945, some 1,372 US Army personnel and 3,327 Australians served aboard its vessels. There were also seamen from many other Allied countries. The Small Ships crews officially incurred 36 casualties throughout their service. The 1960 American film The Wackiest Ship in the Army was based on one of the small ships. In 2005, the Forgotten Fleet Memorial was dedicated to the Small Ships in Cairns. In 2010, the section was inducted into the US Army Transportation Corps Hall of Fame, recognising the pivotal role played by the section in sustaining the Allied liberation of the Pacific. On 15 May 2001, a commemorative plaque was unveiled at the former site of the section's headquarters at the Grace Building in Sydney.

Former members of the Merchant Navy received the same access to military awards as former service personnel in 1994. A movement then began to get the same recognition for Small Ships veterans. The Australian Defence Honours and Awards Tribunal rejected this in 2004, 2005, 2006, 2007 and 2008, before finally accepting in 2009. On 9 November 2009, the parliamentary secretary for Defence Support, Mike Kelly, announced that the tribunal had expanded the eligibility criteria for campaign awards to Small Ships veterans, making them eligible for Australian awards on the same basis as members of the merchant navy, regardless of whether they had received US awards for the same service. This included eligibility for the War Medal 1939–1945, the 1939–1945 Star and the Pacific Star.
