= Ndakunimba Stones =

Petroglyphs in Fiji

- Vatu Vola (Fijian)
- Location within Fiji
- 16.745°S 179.848°E
- Type: Rock art/petroglyphs
- Cultures: Lapita culture
- Location: Ndakunimba/Dakuniba Village, Cakaudrove Province, Vanua Levu, Fiji

History
- Built: c. 500 BC
- Event: Settling of Fiji

Site notes
- Material: Stone
- Archaeologists: Bruce and Sheridan Fahnestock
- Discovered: 1934 - 1937
- Condition: 14 fragments

Ndakunimba Village on Vanua Levu

The Ndakunimba Stones are the remains of a 50-foot-tall monolith carved with petroglyphs, located in Dakuniba (pronounced [ɛn dakunimba], town outside the pale), a remote village in Cakaudrove Province on Vanua Levu, Fiji. They comprise about 14 stone fragments of various sizes, with deeply carved angular figures.

The stones were discovered by Bruce and Sheridan Fahnestock on an expedition between 1935 and 1937 for the American Museum of Natural History. While the petroglyphs were at first thought to have been an early notational system, they have yet to be deciphered.

== Origins ==
The origins of the stones are uncertain. A local legend from Viti Levu has that Vanua and Viti were once one island. Currently, the two islands are 30 miles apart, with deep water in-between. Supposedly this island had a written language. After the island split apart, the men of Viti Levu tried to carry records of the language to the other half, now Vanua Levu, by loading monoliths with carved symbols into canoes. The canoes sank before reaching Vanua Levu, but were bound for a spot near Nadakunimba. The Fahnestock brothers searched there and found one monolith, which fit the descriptions in the legend. It had been set originally on the side of a hill, but had fallen back against the hill and broken into several fragments. One of these the Fahnestocks estimated to have weighed 40 tons.

Other legends by the local Mabuco people refer to the stones as the "Vatu Vola", and say it was transported on the Rogovoka (Note: one of the ships that brought people to Fiji, about 3,500 years ago) on its last voyage from Verata. The ship had also transferred sacred rocks to the king of Tonga before coming to Fiji. This legend says the monolith was originally a statue but crumbled from years of exposure. After the Vatu Vola was erected, the ship was sunk so that the ship, which reached from Nadakunimba to Vunisavisavi Village, could not be used to find the Vatu Vola. Other petroglyphs (ivakatakilakila or signs of Lewaqoroqoro) in the Sawa-i-Lau caves off Yasawa island are supposed to be similar. Another site named Vatu Vola has also been identified at Moturiki, although the carvings are different.

== Identification attempts ==
Originally the Fahnestocks believed that the symbols were Chinese, and officials at the Fiji Museum in Suva assured them that this was true, but scholars in China disproved this.

In 2016, a team of scientists from Israel visited the site and identified one character as similar to the Hebrew letter Yodh (Hebrew: י).

== Sources and further reading ==
- THE FAHNESTOCK SOUTH SEA COLLECTION
- Bruce and Sheridan Fahnestock (1938), Stars to Windward. Harcourt, Brace and Co. OCLC 1693275
- Mary Sheridan Fahnestock (1939) I Ran Away to Sea at Fifty. Harcourt, Brace OCLC 1268265
- Bob Martin (August 22, 2013). The Mysterious Stones of Ndakunimba: A Discovery of the Fahnestock South Seas Expedition. Distributed via Smashwords. ISBN 9781301017195.
- "LOST WORLD CLUE FOUND IN PACIFIC: Swastika-Like Symbols Are discovered by South Seas Expedition". Pittsburgh Daily Press. October 20, 1937.
