= Sachida Nand Sharma =

Fijian politician

Sachida Nand Sharma MOF is a politician who was one of the eight nominees of the Leader of the Opposition to the Senate of Fiji after the 2006 elections. In March 2012 he was appointed the acting leader of the Fiji Labour Party. In August 2019 he was appointed acting president of the party following the death of Lavinia Padarath. He was replaced in November 2019 by Anand Singh.
