= Aisea Katonivere =

Fijian chief and politician (died 2013)

Ratu Aisea Cavunailoa Katonivere (died 18 April 2013) was a Fijian chief and politician who hailed from the chiefly village of Naduri from the northern Province of Macuata, where he was the Paramount Chief and Chairman of the Provincial Council. He held the title of Caumatalevu na Turaga na Tui Macuata, which is usually abbreviated to Tui Macuata.

== Political career ==
In the parliamentary election of 2001, he contested the Macuata Fijian Communal Constituency for the Soqosoqo Duavata ni Lewenivanua (SDL), but was defeated by Isireli Leweniqila of the Conservative Alliance (CAMV). On 23 February 2006, he announced his candidacy for the Presidency or Vice-Presidency. When the Great Council of Chiefs met on 8 March, however, it reelected Ratu Josefa Iloilo as President and Ratu Joni Madraiwiwi as Vice-President.

In June 2006, the Great Council of Chiefs chose Katonivere as one of its fourteen nominees to the Senate. He held this position until the 2006 Fijian coup d'état.

In 2006, he was awarded a Golden Ocean Conservation Award by the World Wildlife Fund for his work on protecting marine biodiversity.

In May 2008, he lost his position as chair of the Macuata provincial council and was replaced by Isireli Leweniqila.

== Succession ==
Katonivere died on a fishing trip when his boat capsized. He was succeeded as Tui Macuata by his younger brother, Ratu Wiliame Katonivere in 2013.
