= Whitney South Sea Expedition =

Scientific expedition to the South Pacific

- Location: Antipodes Islands; New Hebrides; Papua New Guinea; Solomon Islands
- Sponsor: Harry Payne Whitney
- Affiliation: American Museum of Natural History
- Participants: Rollo Beck; Ida Beck; José Correia; Virginia Correia; Ernst Mayr; Hannibal Hamlin

The Whitney South Sea Expedition (1920 - 1941) to collect bird specimens for the American Museum of Natural History (AMNH), under the initial leadership of Rollo Beck, was instigated by Dr Leonard C. Sanford and financed by Harry Payne Whitney, a thoroughbred horse-breeder and philanthropist. It was administered by a committee at the AMNH and became a focus for attracting funds for research on the biota of the Pacific islands.

The expedition visited islands in the south Pacific region and eventually returned with over 40,000 bird specimens, many plant specimens and an extensive collection of anthropological items and photographs.

Using the 75-ton schooner France, with many different scientists and collectors participating over more than a dozen years, the expedition visited thousands of islands throughout Oceania, Micronesia, Polynesia and Melanesia. The France was sold in 1932 when funds ran out.

Specimens from the expedition were displayed in a hall at the AMNH funded by Harry Whitney.

== Aims of the expedition ==
The expedition's main aim was to collect birds from various South Pacific islands and the Pacific Ocean, on behalf of the American Museum of Natural History. The AMNH cooperated with the Bishop Museum in Hawaii and the United States National Museum, exchanging specimens and data. Museum officials were aware that research in the Pacific was urgent, as species were becoming extinct through various causes: introduced mammals such as pigs, dogs, cats and mongooses; spread of introduced birds including the myna; human activities such as copra processing, pearl diving and beche-de-mer fishing and lifestyle changes brought on by modernisation.

The expedition collected not only bird skins, but also nests, eggs, whole birds preserved in alcohol, and bird stomachs from the skinned birds. Lizards, other reptiles, turtles, small mammals such as bats and rodents, and plants were collected for the AMNH and the Bishop Museum. Expedition members also took many photographs and notes about the wildlife, vegetation, topography and lifestyles of the local people they encountered.

== Expedition members ==
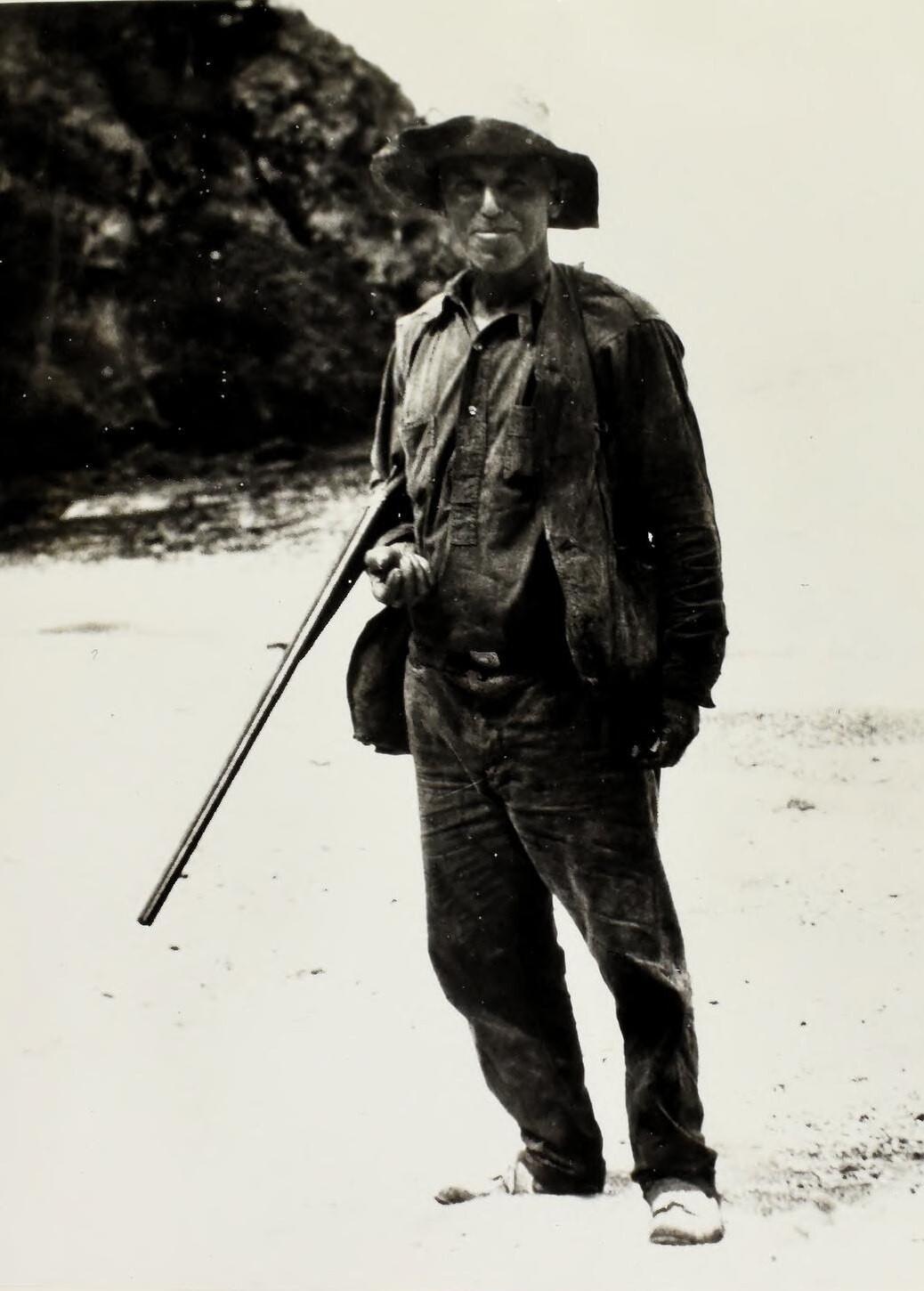
Rollo Beck in October 1924

The expedition was led by Rollo H. Beck (1920–1928), Hannibal Hamlin (1928–1930), William F. Coultas (1930–1935), Lindsay Macmillan (1935–1940), and G. Reid Henry (1941).

Beck, an expert bird collector himself, hired Ernest H. Quayle to assist with collecting, including the botanical specimens collected by the expedition. Quayle was a Stanford University graduate with a geology degree. Beck, his wife Ida and Quayle based themselves in Papeete in 1920, and in 1922 Charles Curtis, who had been working on a plantation in Tahiti, joined the expedition as Beck was readying to leave Tahiti in the France. Curtis spent five months with the expedition before returning to his previous job.

José Correia and his wife Virginia joined the Whitney South Sea Expedition in 1922 to replace Ernest Quayle, with Correia acting as expedition leader for six months in 1923 while Beck was away in New York. Correia was a cooper by trade. While on a trip to the Antarctic as a cooper in 1911, he had met Dr Robert Murphy of the AMNH, who taught him how to prepare bird specimens. Correia then took part in other AMNH expeditions as a bird collector. The Correias left the Whitney expedition at the end of 1926 after contracting malaria, and were replaced by Frederick Drowne.

Edwin Bryan, an entomologist from the Bishop Museum in Hawaii, joined the expedition in 1924. He spent ten months collecting plant and insect specimens before returning to his work in Hawaii.

Dr Frederick P Drowne joined the Whitney Expedition as a field researcher in December 1926. He was a medical doctor and ornithologist from Rhode Island, with connections to the AMNH. He had taken part in several scientific expeditions previously, and had first met Beck during an expedition to the Galapagos Islands. Drowne left the expedition in 1928 due to illness. In June 1930, depressed about his ongoing ill health, he shot himself.

In September 1927, Hannibal Hamlin and Guy Richards, both recent Yale graduates, arrived in the Solomon Islands to join the expedition while Drowne was unwell. Richards left the expedition in 1929 and became a journalist. Hamlin became the expedition leader from March 1928 when Beck left, until January 1930. Coultas then took over and Hamlin left the expedition in August 1930. He returned to Yale and became a neurosurgeon.

William Coultas and his friend Walter Eyerdam arrived to join the expedition at the end of August 1929, and in January 1930 Coultas took over from Hamlin as leader. Walter Eyerdam was a mineralogist and skilled collector of molluscs, plants, birds and mammals. He left the Whitney expedition in mid-1930, later taking part in other expeditions. Coultas returned to New York in 1935 to work for the AMNH, and also took part in other expeditions before joining the US Naval Reserve Force in 1942.

Ernst Mayr from the Berlin Museum joined the expedition on its trip to New Guinea and the Solomon Islands in 1929, after Hamlin had replaced Beck as leader. He left the expedition in February 1930 to return to Germany. Mayr was hired by the AMNH to curate the Rothschild collection in 1933, and he continued to work up the material that returned to the AMNH from the Whitney expeditions. He continued at AMNH until 1953 as curator of birds.

John Boyd ("Jack") Riddall, born in England in 1905, joined the expedition as a bird collector and skinner at the Solomon Islands in May 1930. He had until then been working as a clerk at Lever Brothers plantation on Gavutu. Riddall left the expedition in 1932, lived in Australia and in 1942 enlisted as a flight lieutenant in the Royal Australian Air Force.

Thomas Lindsay Macmillan became leader of the expedition in 1935 after Coultas left. He was a farmer, born in Vanuatu to an Australian father, and had lived in both countries. Macmillan and his wife Joy collected and processed birds for the expedition in New Caledonia, the New Hebrides, Papua New Guinea and Queensland, Australia. Macmillan left the expedition in 1940 to join the Australian navy. In later life he and Joy ran a mission station in the Australian outback.

G Reid Henry led the expedition for a short time in 1940–1941 and was based in Australia.

== The France ==
At first, the expedition was based in Tahiti and used trading vessels to get around the Pacific, but Beck wanted to be free of other people's schedules. He bought the France in December 1921. The France was a 75 gross ton schooner with a 60 hp motor, built in Papeete around 1918 and previously used in the copra trade. The ship was 71 feet long, 25 feet wide and had a draught of 6 feet. Between 1922 and 1932, the expedition used the France to travel all over the Pacific. When the France left Papeete on 1 February 1922 the crew consisted of the captain, mate, engineer, cook, three sailors and a cabin boy, as well as Beck, Quayle and Curtis. Crew members came from around the Pacific.

Captains of the France during the expedition included Marten Nagle (1922–1924); E A Stenbeck (1924–1926); J W R Richmond; William Henry Burrell (Nov 1929-July 1930), A J D McArthur (1930–1932), and Thomas R Lang.

In 1932 funding for the expedition ran out and Dr Murphy of the AMNH wrote to Coultas to confirm that the France must be disposed of. The ship was sold to WR Carpenter and Co. Renamed Dawaun, she was wrecked when she ran aground on a reef off the Carteret Islands on 29 October 1936.

== Specimen collection ==
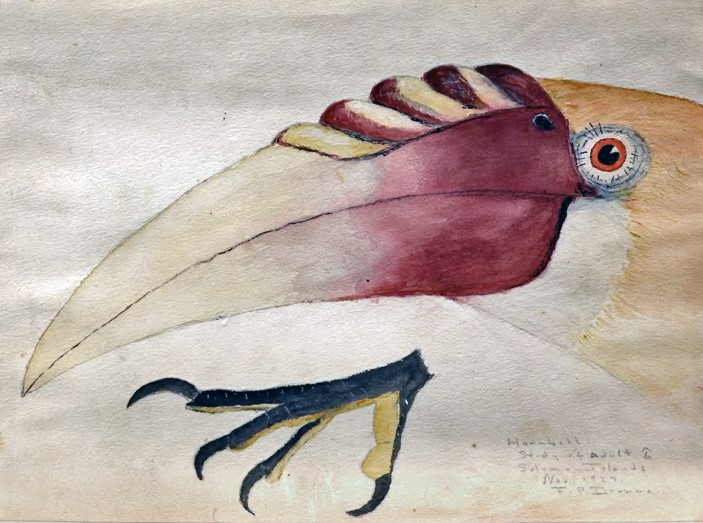
Hornbill, Solomon Islands. Watercolour by F P Drowne.

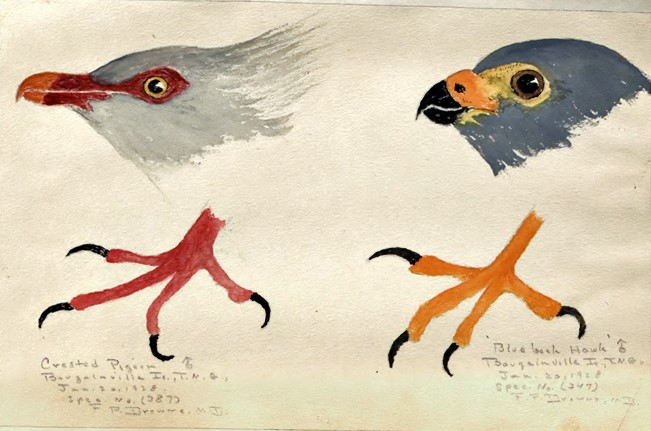
Birds from Bougainville Island. Watercolour by F P Drowne.

The expedition travelled between island groups by ship, either getting passage on local vessels, using the schooner France that they had purchased, or chartering other vessels such as the Pato, a schooner hired by Coultas in 1933. Bird specimens were collected by various methods. On the ocean, the expedition's ship might pass by a flock of birds which could be shot from on board. On reaching an island, expedition members would go ashore by rowboat to shoot birds along the coast, or walk and climb into the interior of the island to seek out and shoot land birds and other specimens. On inhabited islands, the team would consult the local people to find out about the types and habits of various birds, and would employ local guides to take them to nesting areas. Local people were also paid to collect specimens for the expedition. Specimens had to be processed quickly before they decomposed. Sometimes the expedition members would set up a base on land and process the birds there, but otherwise skinning was typically done by the light of benzine lamps in the hold of the France. Supplies needed for processing birds included arsenic, alum, benzine, cornmeal, needles, bone cutters, cotton wrapping and labels. "It is certainly an art to accomplish it the way it ought to be done, that is to say removing the skeleton, bones, flesh, intestines and fatty parts, leaving the wings and feathers properly sewed for mounting or museum reference". "One can wash plumage quite well if blood is removed with water, then the benzine, and dry in corn meal, and this was our usual procedure". Coultas described how an adult cassowary specimen was prepared:

This bird kept us busy most of the night, skinning and degreasing. Several natives assisted us by holding the skin while we scraped and worked. Once cleaned we washed the whole thing in gasolene, then inserted sticks and bamboos in the neck and body to hold the skin apart so that it might dry more quickly. One cassowary is an 18 hour job for two people. Once cleaned we simply hung it under the roof to dry as expediently as possible.

Formaldehyde, salt brine or methyl spirit were used to preserve specimens such as frogs and snakes. Expedition members were expected to work from early morning until late at night collecting and processing specimens. Sundays, supposedly a day off, were the only time available for typing up notes, making sketches, preparing labels and getting ready for the week ahead.

Along with supplies for processing specimens, the expedition needed to carry photography equipment, medical supplies, numerous guns and copious amounts of ammunition in various sizes. Calico, tobacco and other items were carried for use as trade goods. Local boys and men were employed to carry packs, do chores around camp and also as "shoot boys", helping to hunt land birds. Some of the ship's crew of Pacific Islanders also became adept at skinning and processing collected specimens.

Processed specimens were shipped back to the AMNH when the expedition's vessel arrived at a port. Mail was collected and sent, food and other supplies were stocked up and maintenance would be carried out on the ship. Funds for supplies and for paying the ships crew and shoot boys were organised as well.

The expedition had to get permits to collect specimens from the various territories that they visited. Beck found this irritating, writing to Murphy at the AMNH in 1924:

As our permit allows but 20 birds of the protected kinds, I am assuming that you will determine most of the land birds out here to be others different than the ones given in the list of protected birds. As you want to send some specimens of these almost distinct forms to the British Musem, the limit, ten, is in the case of insectivorous birds, entirely too small a number. I suggest that you emphasize the fact, especially as this expedition is in a field never before collected and not likely to be again for a long time. Unless of course the Managing Director is one of the biased individuals whom reason does not appeal to.

=== Controversy in New Zealand ===
Early in 1925, the New Zealand Government declined a request by the expedition to collect bird specimens from the Cook Islands, saying that although the government supported the aims of the expedition, it believed that "the interests of science are being better served by a policy of strict preservation of the living birds".

In July 1925 the New Zealand Native Bird Protection Society warned the government that the expedition's goal of observing New Zealand's birds actually meant observing "over the sight of a shot gun". The Society asked the government to put an observer on board the France, but the government went ahead and issued a permit for the expedition to collect 846 birds, without requiring that an observer to be present. This was vigorously protested by Val Sanderson of the Native Bird Protection Society. He stated that he had heard that Harvard University's Museum of Comparative Zoology believed that all New Zealand's native birds were "doomed" and should therefore be collected before they became extinct. Sanderson wrote to the Minister of Internal Affairs:

That an extensively equipped foreign collecting expedition on such a scale and with permission to kill the extravagant number of birds allowed should be given entirely unrestricted liberty, except by a few valueless written conditions, amongst our birds, some of which are on the verge of extinction, is unthinkable, a slur on the regard which the people of New Zealand are evincing in the welfare of their heritage, the care of which is entrusted to your department. Your action is also a slight to the operations of this society, and it seems idle and hypocritical for us to continue further work and collect subscriptions from school children and others in the face of such departmental lassitude. We think, moreover, it would only have been courtesy had you consulted us before issuing permits to destroy any of the extremely rare species included in the list to be killed, as, for instance, the Chatham Island bell bird, Auckland Island duck, Chatham Island fern bird and pigeon, sand plover (ten is out of all reason), Chatham Island snipe, Southern Merganser, and half a dozen other species which are on the verge of extinction and should not have been allowed to be killed under any circumstances whatever. Some little scientific information of interest to a few may he gleaned, but at the possible extermination of some species the skins of which will be then of more monetary value to the Americans, in whose possession they will be. The numbers permitted to be destroyed are quite in excess of scientific requirements, and clearly indicate the purpose for which they are required.

After the Society protested, a museum officer was sent to accompany the expedition, and the Minister decided that in future permits would only be issued on the condition that an official would accompany any expedition collecting native birds. Beck wrote to Murphy in February 1926: "Somehow, the Government located us and sent us an urgent telegram yesterday saying that Mr. Oliver of the Dominion Museum wanted to accompany us to the southern islands. I managed, when at Wellington, to put him off but yesterday had to agree."

Beck responded publicly to criticism that the expedition was a commercial enterprise that was killing rare birds. He noted that all the specimens collected were sent to the non-profit National Museum of Art and History in New York, where students from all over the world could study them. Regarding suggestions that rare birds were killed, he stated :

All this talk about exterminating rare and protected birds is not new to me. I have heard it all before, in different places, and notably in my own country, California. The average layman never seems to be able to appreciate the fact that specimens of birds are most valuable from a scientific point of view. There is a very great deal yet to be discovered concerning the habits of the birds, and it is only by means of the facts ascertained and the specimens obtained by an expedition such as this, that scientists can arrive at the truth.

In April 1926, a list of 385 birds taken by the expedition in New Zealand waters was published. Most of Beck's specimens were collected on the 'high seas', and he claimed that he could take any birds as long as he was more than three miles from land and did not bring the birds to New Zealand. However, as Walter Oliver from the Dominion Museum pointed out, Beck had also discovered during the expedition that birds that breed in New Zealand may migrate as far as Chile or California. Such species had been collected from all over the Pacific, so any list of New Zealand birds taken did not represent the total number of New Zealand-breeding sea birds collected by the expedition.

== Issues and incidents ==
Members of the expedition contracted various ailments including arsenic poisoning, dengue fever, malaria and tropical ulcers or "island sores". Drowne spent time in hospital in the Solomon Islands and had 20 injections of antimony in an attempt to cure his ulcers on his legs, writing that:

The tropical ulcers are a terrible thing. The cause is probably some specific organism, whether germ or parasite no one seems to know at present. They much resemble the leishmaniasis sores which occur elsewhere. The cause not being known, there are many suggested forms of treatment all of which may do good but none of which seem at all specific.

There were also personality clashes and periods of low morale on board the France. Seven years into the expedition, Beck was regarded as energetic, curt and eccentric and not well liked by the crew. Drowne wrote in his journal that Beck was a remarkable success as a bird collector, but a failure as a leader in the field:

He is unable to work even to the best advantage, or to inspire [the men's] cooperation and loyalty. A feeling of loyalty to the Museum, or to someone else abroad has kept men on this thing, as in the case of sailors a contract, when otherwise they would have made sudden and speedy departure.

Drowne also believed that it was important to establish friendly relations with the local people when entering their territory.

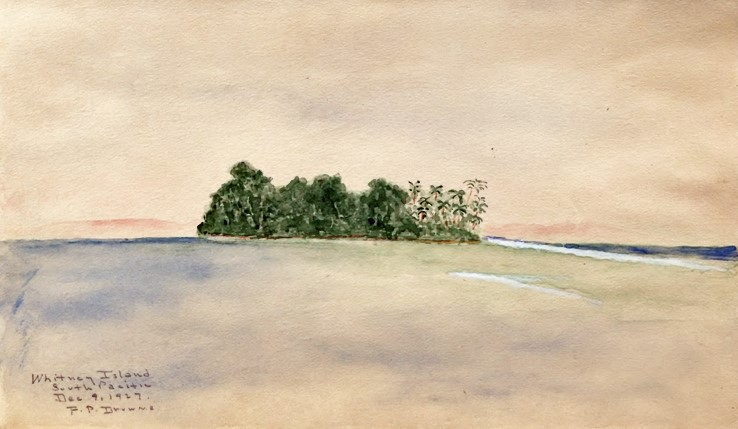
"Whitney Island", 11 miles east of the Shortland Islands. Watercolour by F P Drowne, 1927

The France faced gales and storms and high seas in the Pacific Ocean. On 2 June 1926 the expedition met particularly bad weather, which the captain recorded in his logbook: "Sky extremely ugly [...] Squalls at frequent intervals of severe intensity and with heavy rain, hail, lightning and thunder. Sea high and confused.[...] Water spout passed very close ahead.[....] Vessel shipped considerable amount of water [...] Suspect the above, to be passing very close to centre of cyclonic system". Jose Correia used more colourful language to describe the storm: “…we ran into the center of a strong cyclone on June 2nd. Everybody in the ship thought that they were never going to see land again, but God did not forget us in the middle of the furious ocean.” Approaching reefs in smaller boats could also be extremely dangerous. After an incident where an islander nearly drowned trying to get a boat through the surf of a coral reef in bad weather, Quayle noted that it was no job for "inexperienced white men".

In 1923, Beck released three goats on Henderson Island and was criticised for this in a magazine article which said the goats would damage the island's ecosystem. The Governor of Fiji then asked Beck to kill the goats and not release any more. Beck wrote that:

...this is a desert island with little rainfall and I had in mind shipwrecked sailors who have lived on Henderson and may try to exist there again. Having been shipwrecked once it is possible I have a more fellow feeling for the sailor than for the carping sentimentalist who sits at his desk and writes feelingly of localities of which he knows nothing. [...] I do not regret having planted the goats, except as it interferes with the Museum. The bally, blooming shipwrecked English sailors can all starve on the next island they get thrown onto as far as I am concerned, though I am anticipating that experience myself sometime [...] If only I could lead some of these critics about ten feet from the landing place on Henderson, or similar islands here in the Lau group, they would express different opinions regarding the suitability of goats for such conditions.

The expedition collected birds at Tinakula, an island volcano in the Solomon Islands, during an eruption in March 1927. Beck observed that the leaves of plants were covered in fine dust from the smoking crater, and said "Mrs. Beck went ashore with me and we heard the lava boulders rattling down gullies above our heads after one violent explosion from the active crater on top". Later, back on board the France, they watched lava rolling down the mountain.

On 8 December 1927 the expedition anchored near a small group of low-lying islets about 11 miles west of the Shortland Islands. Beck and others went ashore to two of the islands and obtained some birds. The islands were unnamed on the expedition's chart, so for purposes of labelling the specimens, they dubbed the islands "Whitney Island". The islets were located at approximately latitude 6 58 S and longitude 155 38 E, a few miles away from an island called Momalufa.

== Expedition timeline ==
date	location
Sep 1920	Commencement of the expedition: Rollo and Ida Beck and Ernest Quayle leave San Francisco for Tahiti.
1920–1923	Expedition is based at Papeete in Tahiti, and travels to various places via trading vessels or ships transporting copra and other cargo. Specimens are collected from the Society Islands, Tuamotu, the Marquesas and Pitcairn Island.
Dec 1921	Expedition buys schooner France at Papeete. The ship is fitted out, and departs Papeete on 1 February 1922.
Dec 1923	Expedition shifts its base to Samoa.
23 Apr 1924	Arrival at Apia, Samoa.
28 May 1924	Expedition departs for Fiji, arriving at Suva on 7 June 1924.
1 Jul 1924	Departure from Suva for Tonga, returning to Suva on 19 July 1924.
Jul–Oct 1924	Visiting many Fijian islands, returning to Suva on 29 October 1924.
4 June 1925	France leaves Suva for Tonga, while Beck stays a little longer in Fiji.
26 Oct 1925	France departs Suva for New Zealand, via Kermadec and Norfolk Island.
11 Dec 1925	Arrival at Auckland, New Zealand.
12 Jan 1926	Departure from Auckland on a loop around New Zealand, stopping at Chatham, Bounty, Antipodes, Campbell and Auckland Islands.
27 Jan 1926	France visits Lyttelton for supplies, ignoring international code signals.
3 Feb 1926	France departs Akaroa for Stewart island, but due to gale-force winds cannot reach there and instead goes to the Chatham Islands.
25 Mar 1926	France arrives at Auckland and the ship is overhauled.
20 Apr 1926	Departure from New Zealand for Norfolk Island and the New Hebrides (now Vanuatu).
1926–1928	Based in Solomon Islands for 17 months
early 1928	To Bismarck Archipelago.
June 1928	Beck leaves the expedition at the Solomons in June 1928 and is en route to the United States when he receives a message asking him to collect specimens In Papua New Guinea.
9 Dec 1928	France arrives at Port Moresby under the leadership of Hannibal Hamlin.
1929	Beck returns to the US.
Jul 1930	France travels from the Solomons to Samarai. Coultas replaces Hamlin as expedition leader. 18-month trip to Carolines planned.
Aug 1930	Hamlin returns to US.
mid 1935	Coultas returns to New York.
1935-1940	Expedition is led by Lindsay MacMillan, who with his wife sources specimens in New Caledonia, the New Hebrides, Papua New Guinea and Queensland, Australia. Macmillan leaves the expedition in 1940 to serve in World War 2.
1941	The expedition pauses for a time due to the war, then is led by G Reid Henry, based in Australia, until it officially ends in 1941.

== Legacy ==
The expedition was important for several reasons. The specimens and data collected provided a large database for subsequent studies of birds in the Pacific. The expedition was able to confirm the role of geographical isolation in the development of new species, as described by Darwin in his studies of finches in the Galapagos Islands almost a hundred years earlier. In 1938, Murphy stated that the expedition had so far identified 196 new species and sub-species of birds. One of the birds collected during the expedition was Procellaria munda (as named by Kuhl in 1820). A specimen of this bird was collected and sketched during Captain Cook's first world voyage in 1769, but there had been no further documented sightings until Beck saw the bird, a type of shearwater, on 16 February 1926. The expedition was also able to confirm the long-distance migration patterns of various sea birds including the long-tailed cuckoo (Urodynamis taitensis).

In 1929, Sanford asked the Whitneys to fund a new wing for the American Museum of Natural History, which would house the many specimens being collected by the South Sea expedition and other expeditions in Africa and South America. Construction of the Whitney Wing began with ground breaking in 1931, but was interrupted by World War 2. Part of the new wing was to be called the Whitney Hall of Oceanic Birds and would feature the birds of the Pacific.

Following the Whitney South Sea Expedition, Sheridan Fahnestock led a group of 18, including seven college students, on an expedition to the Pacific. The second Fahnestock Expedition was sponsored by the Whitney Hall at the AMNH, to supplement the birds collected by the Whitney South Sea Expedition by collecting plants and other specimens to display in dioramas at the Whitney Hall which was then under construction. The ship Director II, a three-masted, 110-ton auxiliary schooner, left New York in February 1940, travelling to Australia via the Panama Canal and various Pacific Islands. The expedition ended prematurely in October 1940 when the ship struck a reef near Gladstone in Queensland and sank.

The Whitney Hall of Oceanic Birds finally opened in the new wing of the AMNH in 1952, with 18 windows showing dioramas of over 400 species of birds from the Pacific region in their natural habitats. In 1998, 10 of the 18 dioramas in the Whitney Hall were covered up to make way for the installation of a butterfly conservatory. The butterfly exhibit was supposed to be temporary but has remained in place, and most of the bird displays are not viewable.

== Bibliography ==
- Chapman, Frank M. (1935). The Whitney South Sea Expedition. Science 81: 95–97.
- Murphy, R.C. (1922). Science 56: 701–704.
