= Dixon Seeto =

Fijian businessman (1951–2019)

Dixon Raphael Seeto OF (Chinese: 司徒新耀; pinyin: Sītú Xīnyào; 14 July 1951 – 19 July 2019) was a Fijian businessman and political leader of Chinese descent. He was President of the Fiji Islands Hotel and Tourism Association and of the Chinese Association of Fiji. In June 2006 he was appointed to the Fijian Senate as one of 9 nominees of the Prime Minister, Laisenia Qarase.

On completing his secondary education in 1969, Seeto worked initially for Fiji Airways and later for Tapa International together with David Wilson and the Warwick Hotel. From 1971 to 1974, he was employed by British Airways while studying aviation in London, on a scholarship. Upon graduating, he joined Fiji Airways, where he remained until 1987. On 10 December 2005, Seeto won the 2005 Excellence Award for his contribution to the tourism industry, the Fiji Times reported the following day.

== Death ==
On 27 June 2019, he was involved in a motor vehicle accident in Sigatoka, for which he was hospitalised after which he was airlifted to the Princess Alexandra Hospital in Brisbane. He died in his sleep on 19 July 2019.
