= Manoa Rasigatale =

Fijian politician and television personality (1947–2026)

Ratu Manoa Rasigatale (July 11, 1947 – June 5, 2026) was a Fijian historian, journalist, musician, television personality and politician. He was a member of the Senate of Fiji and represented Rewa.

== Life and career ==
Rasigatale was born on July 11, 1947, and came from the village of Nabuli in Rewa Province.

In the 1970s he worked as a journalist for Fijian newspaper Nai Lalakai and Pacific Islands Monthly and was director and manager of the Fiji Dance Theatre cultural troupe. In 1985 he established the Fijian Cultural Center at the Pacific Harbour International Resort near Suva, where he planned to build a replica Drua. In 1993 and 1994 his dance troupe performed at the Polynesian Cultural Center in Hawaii as part of a cultural exchange. In 1994, it performed in Las Vegas.

In 2009 he hosted We Ni Yava Misiki. In 2016 he hosted documentary drama series Mai Muri Mai.

In October 2020 he was awarded the Fiji 50th Anniversary commemorative medal.

Rasigatale died on June 5, 2026, at the age of 78.
