= Taito Waqavakatoga =

Fijian politician and former civil servant

Taito Waqavakatoga (5 August 1944 — 12 December 2017) was a Fijian politician and former civil servant who served as President of the Senate of Fiji from 2001 to 2006.

== Works ==
Waqavakatoga worked as a civil servant, beginning as a Field Assistant in the Agriculture Department. In 1987 he organised the harvest of sugar cane in the Labasa and Seaqaqa districts, during a harvest boycott by farmers protesting the 1987 Fijian coups d'état. From 1990 to 1999 he served in the office of the Attorney-General of Fiji as Registrar-General. In 2001 he was nominated to the Senate of Fiji as one of the representatives of Rewa Province, and was elected President of the Senate. He served in that role until 2006.

Waqavakatoga's tenure as Senate president was controversial. He tolerated seditious speeches by supporters of the 2000 Fijian coup d'état. In December 2004 he was referred to the privileges committee for his management of the chamber. When Senator Inoke Takiveikata was jailed for treason over the coup, Waqavakatoga waited a year before stripping him of his seat, during which time Takiveikata continued to receive his salary. On 7 December 2005, Waqavakatoga confirmed that he was the coordinator of a local group affiliated to the Inter Religious Federation for World Peace International, which has ties to the controversial Unification Church. He joined Opposition Leader Mahendra Chaudhry in criticizing a government decision to ban Moon, who had been scheduled to address a conference in Nadi on 6 December, from visiting Fiji.

== Death ==
From 2007 to 2009 he served on the board of the Fiji Visitors Bureau. He died on his farm in Navua in December 2017.
