= Kinijoji Maivalili =

Fijian Chief and former political leader

Ratu Kinijoji Maivalili

President of the Senate of Fiji
- In office 5 June 2006 – Unknown
- Constituency: Cakaudrove Province

Personal details
- Died: June 27, 2016
- Occupation: Chief, politician

Ratu Kinijoji R. Maivalili was a Fijian Chief and former political leader. From 2001 to 2006, he represented the Province of Cakaudrove in the Senate as one of fourteen nominees of the Great Council of Chiefs. Previously, he sat in the House of Representatives representing the Cakaudrove West Fijian Communal Constituency, which he won in 1999 but lost in 2001.

Reappointed to the Senate in May 2006, he was subsequently elected President of the Senate at its first sitting on the 5th of June. Government-nominated Senator Hafiz Khan was elected as his deputy.

Maivalili died on 27 June 2016.
