= Cakaudrove West (Fijian Communal Constituency, Fiji) =

Former electoral constituency in Fiji

Cakaudrove West Fijian Provincial Communal is a former electoral division of Fiji, one of 23 communal constituencies reserved for indigenous Fijians. Established by the 1997 Constitution, it came into being in 1999 and was used for the parliamentary elections of 1999, 2001, and 2006. (Of the remaining 48 seats, 23 were reserved for other ethnic communities and 25, called Open Constituencies, were elected by universal suffrage). The electorate covered western areas of Cakaudrove Province, in the southeastern part of the northern island of Vanua Levu.

The 2013 Constitution promulgated by the Military-backed interim government abolished all constituencies and established a form of proportional representation, with the entire country voting as a single electorate.

== Election results ==
In the following tables, the primary vote refers to first-preference votes cast. The final vote refers to the final tally after votes for low-polling candidates have been progressively redistributed to other candidates according to pre-arranged electoral agreements (see electoral fusion), which may be customized by the voters (see instant run-off voting).

In the 1999 election, Ratu Kinijoji Maivalili won with more than 50 percent of the primary vote; therefore, there was no redistribution of preferences.

=== 1999 ===
Candidate	Political party	Votes	%
Ratu Kinijoji Maivalili	Soqosoqo ni Vakavulewa ni Taukei (SVT)	5,460	68.94
Salote Raikolo Qalo	Christian Democratic Alliance (VLV)	1,910	24.12
Tuisuva Voreqe	Fijian Association Party (FAP)	550	6.94
Total		7,920	100.00

=== 2001 ===
Candidate	Political party	Votes (primary)	%	Votes (final)	%
Ratu Rakuita Saurara Vakalalabure	Conservative Alliance (CAMV)	3,207	45.39	4,722	66.83
Ilisoni Vaniqi Ligairi	Independent	1,469	20.79	2,244	31.76
Manasa Ramasirai Vaniqi	Soqosoqo Duavata ni Lewenivanua (SDL)	1,615	22.86	...	...
Ratu Kinijoji Maivalili	Fijian Political Party (SVT)	775	10.97	...	...
Total		7,066	100.00	7,066	100.00

=== 2006 ===
Candidate	Political party	Votes	%
Niko Nawaikula	United Fiji Party (SDL)	7,674	90.10
Manasa Ramasirai Vaniqi	Independent	607	7.13
Josua Vosawale	National Federation Party (NFP)	236	2.77
Total		8,517	100.00

== Sources ==
- Psephos - Adam Carr's electoral archive
- Fiji Facts
