= Fiji Native Tribal Congress =

The Fiji Native Tribal Congress (FNTC) was established in June 2011 to advance, protect and maintain the rights of indigenous Fijians, in accordance with the 2007 United Nations Declaration On the Rights of Indigenous Peoples (UNDRIP) in a manner that balances equitably those rights with the rights of other individuals and groups in Fiji.

To that end, it aims to liaise with the government of the day and concerned citizens and to work with others to advance the general cause of Human Rights.

The Congress was established by the Paramount Chiefs of Fiji's tribal confederacies and concerned citizens. The Congress is administered by a Trust Board comprising: the Paramount Chiefs of two of Fiji's three tribal confederacies – namely, Ratu Naiqama Lalabalavu, the Tui Cakau (Paramount Chief of the Tovata Tribal Confederacy) and Ro Teimumu Kepa, the Roko Tui Dreketi (Paramount Chief of the Burebasaga Tribal Confederacy).

The Vunivalu of Bau, Paramount Chief of Fiji's third Tribal Confederacy, Kubuna, is still in the process of selection and appointment under traditional protocol.

The other members of the Trust Board are three laypersons: Jese Sikivou, Dr Mere Samisoni and its secretary, Niko Nawaikula. Chief Executive Officer Emosi Toga serves as the secretariat for the Trust Board, assisted by a three person staff.

The Congress is funded by donations and gifts and all posts are on a voluntary basis.

The FNTC, under its constitution, is required to work with concerned citizens, UN agencies, Human Rights organizations, NGOs and the government of the day to protect, maintain and advance the rights of other individuals and groups in Fiji. In the same way, FNTC is tasked to promote and protect Human Rights generally.
