= Fahnestock South Sea Expeditions =

Historical scientific expeditions

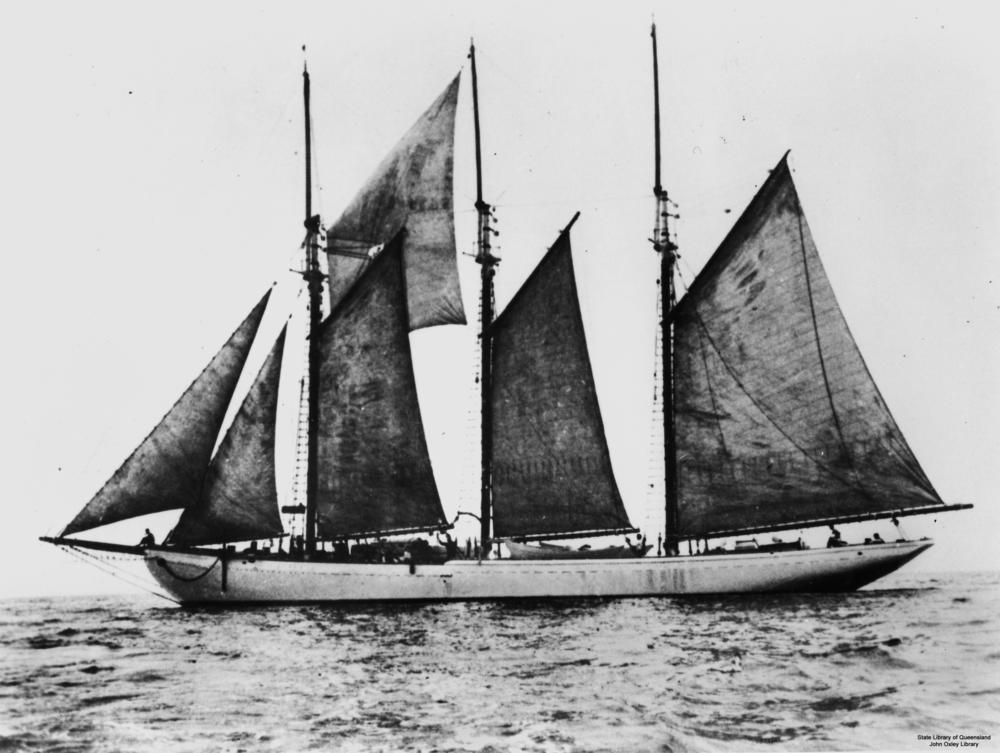
Director II stuck on a sandbar

The Fahnestock South Sea Expeditions were three scientific expeditions to the Pacific Ocean during 1935–1937, 1940 and 1941, organised and led by brothers Sheridan and Bruce Fahnestock. The Fahnestocks collected plant and animal specimens for museums in the United States, made recordings of traditional songs and music from Pacific Islands, and on the third expedition collected intelligence for the United States armed forces after the outbreak of World War II.

== First expedition 1935–1937 ==
The first expedition sailed from New York on 1 January 1935, in the 65ft schooner Director. The captain of the expedition was 21-year-old James Sheridan Fahnestock, and his brother Bruce (25) was director. Four other men specialising in various fields were also part of the expedition: herpetologist and photographer Hugh Davis, director of the Mohawk Zoo in Tulsa; ornithologist and artist Dennis Puleston from England; Wilson Glass and George Harris. Later participants included John Green and artist Edward Dair.

The expedition aimed to study flying fish in the Pacific, as well as insects and birds. The Fahnestocks’ widowed mother, Mary Sheridan Fahnestock, joined the expedition during its eight-month stay in Tahiti and subsequently wrote a book called I Ran Away To Sea At Fifty. After leaving Tahiti, the expedition visited Samoa, Fiji, the New Hebrides, Solomon Islands, and New Guinea, collecting many specimens for the American Museum of Natural History.

The expedition discovered six uncharted sandy islands near the Santa Cruz Islands, which they named the 'Good Director Islands' after their ship, but the islands have not been found since at the stated coordinates.

The plan had been to sail the Director back to New York, but the team members caught malaria. The Director was sold in the Philippines and the expedition members proceeded to Peking, arriving there in 1937 at the time of the Japanese invasion. Sheridan Fahnestock stated that he "was slapped by a Japanese soldier while taking newsreel pictures of the invading forces". The expedition members sent their ethnological collections back to the AMNH and sailed home on a liner, arriving back in the United States by early 1938. The Fahnestock brothers published a book about their experiences, Stars to Windward.

One of the expedition's discoveries was petroglyphs of unknown origin carved into the remains of a monolith in Fiji, which are today known as the Ndakunimba Stones.

== Second expedition 1940 ==
Sheridan Fahnestock organised a second expedition in the three-masted schooner Director II, a gift to the Fahnestock brothers from their aunt Helen Fahnestock Hubbard, a patron of the arts who had made her own trips to the South Pacific. At 137 ft long, Director II was twice as large the previous ship Director. The expedition was sponsored by the National Broadcasting Company of America, the Carnegie Corporation and the American Museum of Natural History (AMNH). The ship carried radio equipment and it was planned to make live broadcasts on the NBC Blue Network so that the public could follow the expedition's progress. The expedition also carried a two-seater plane aboard Director II, specially built for rapid assembly and disassembly. The plane was to be used for mapping and scouting out territories and carrying supplies ashore to island bases and was equipped with a radio and a homing device.

Director II left New York on 1 February 1940 with a crew of 19: Sheridan and Bruce Fahnestock, their mother Mary Sheridan Fahnestock, scientist George Folster, entomologist Coleman Glover, anthropologist John McK Scott, museum preparators George Peterson and Bryce Metcalf, artist Edward Dair, and several college students. The wives of Sheridan and Bruce Fahnestock and George Folster joined the trip later.

One of the second expedition's aims was to record traditional music in the Pacific for Helen Fahnestock Hubbard's Fahnestock-Hubbard Foundation at Columbia University. The Fahnestocks had seen during their first expedition that traditional music was rapidly being lost due to changing lifestyles and the introduction of radio and gramophones. The Fahnestocks used two 1937 Presto instantaneous disc cutters which recorded sound on to 16-inch diameter aluminium discs coated with cellulose acetate. Specially-insulated microphone cable two miles long allowed the team to leave the disc cutters on the ship while making recordings on shore. Most of the pieces of music were recorded at 78 rpm, with a maximum recording time of about five minutes. Over 100 hours of music was recorded, including a Balinese scale not previously identified, “prediction songs" from the Marquesas Islands, Tahitian guitar music accompanied by "double talk", and Tahitian versions of western tunes. The Fahnestocks hoped that the recordings would show connections via migration between different island groups. The Fahnestocks' recordings may be the last field recordings made in the South Pacific before the massive changes in traditional ways of life caused by World War 2. The recordings were played to a public audience in 1942, but then remained in storage until Sheridan Fahnestock's widow contacted the Library of Congress about them in 1986. The Library of Congress restored the recordings, which had deteriorated over time, and in 1994 released a selection of the music as a compact disc.

This expedition also sent back habitat specimens to the AMNH for dioramas being constructed for the Whitney Hall of Oceanic Birds to showcase specimens collected during the Whitney South Sea Expedition. Sheridan Fahnestock noted that:

Care is taken to get these groups exactly right, down to the last grain of sand. Specimens are preserved by five different methods. Plaster casts are made of the flowers, leaves, etc., to preserve shape. Then formalin specimens are kept. The groups are also sketched in water colours and are photographed in black and white. Dried specimens are also collected. Whole trees are shifted to be transplanted into the very same earth in which they formerly rested in their native surroundings.

The voyage was cut short when Director II hit a reef at Gladstone, Queensland and sank in October 1940. Sheridan Fahnestock blamed the reef collision on 200-year-old marine charts. He said that the Australian authorities had been reluctant to provide up-to-date charts because they were worried about a possible attack by Japan, which had begun expanding into Southeast Asia.

== Third expedition 1941 ==
The Fahnestock brothers met President Franklin D. Roosevelt in January 1941, ostensibly to discuss their recent expedition. In fact, the president asked them to undertake an intelligence gathering mission to the Dutch East Indies to assess the area's defence facilities in the face of probable Japanese invasion. In February 1941, the Fahnestocks proceeded to Surabaya and travelled through Southeast Asia for ten months in a chartered ship, recording the music of Bali, Java, Madura, and the Kangean Islands as cover for their intelligence work. They returned to the United States just before the attack on Pearl Harbor on 7 December 1941.

== World War II ==
Both brothers joined the army in 1942. As expert sailors with knowledge of the area, they were sent to New Guinea to oversee the US Army Small Ships Section. This was a group of coastal commercial vessels from Australia and New Zealand that were used to supply US forces in the islands. Bruce Fahnestock was killed in New Guinea in October 1942 when the trawler he was on was mistaken for a Japanese vessel and was attacked by an American fighter plane. Sheridan Fahnestock commanded a small patrol craft ferrying supplies from Australia to New Guinea, and in 1944 was chief of Transport Command at the invasion of the Philippines. Sheridan Fahnestock retired from the army in 1945. He published a weekly newspaper in Maryland from 1946 until bad health forced his retirement in 1963, and died on 7 August 1965.
