= Atunaisa Kaloumaira =

Fijian politician

Atunaisa Kaloumairai is a former Fijian politician. He was a member of the Senate of Fiji and represented Lomaiviti Province.
