= Matareti Sarasau =

Fijian politician and military figure

Colonel Matareti Sarasau is a Fijian politician and military figure. He is a former member of the Senate of Fiji and represented Kadavu Province.
