= Kinijioji Vakawaletabua =

Fijian chief and politician

Ratu Kinijioji Vakawaletabua is a Fijian chief and former political leader. From 2001 to 2006, he represented the Province of Bua in the Senate as one of fourteen nominees of the Great Council of Chiefs.

While a senator, Vakawaletabua called for an inquiry into the 1997 Constitution of Fiji, saying that it had brought suffering, pain, national shame, disgrace, disaster, death and insecurity to indigenous Fijians.
