= Asesela Sadole =

Fijian politician

Asesela Sadole is a Fijian politician. He is a former member of the now-disbanded Senate of Fiji and represented Ba.
