= Macuata (Fijian Communal Constituency, Fiji) =

Former electoral constituency in Fiji

Macuata Fijian Provincial Communal is a former electoral division of Fiji, one of 23 communal constituencies reserved for indigenous Fijians. Established by the 1997 Constitution, it came into being in 1999 and was used for the parliamentary elections of 1999, 2001, and 2006. (Of the remaining 48 seats, 23 were reserved for other ethnic communities and 25, called Open Constituencies, were elected by universal suffrage). The electorate was coextensive with Macuata Province.

The 2013 Constitution promulgated by the Military-backed interim government abolished all constituencies and established a form of proportional representation, with the entire country voting as a single electorate.

== Election results ==
In the following tables, the primary vote refers to first-preference votes cast. The final vote refers to the final tally after votes for low-polling candidates have been progressively redistributed to other candidates according to pre-arranged electoral agreements (see electoral fusion), which may be customized by the voters (see instant run-off voting).

In the 2001 election, Isireli Leweniqila won with more than 50 percent of the primary vote; therefore, there was no redistribution of preferences.

=== 1999 ===
Candidate	Political party	Votes (primary)	%	Votes (final)	%
Poseci Bune	Christian Democratic Alliance	3,355	42.33	4,257	53.71
Ratu Josefa Nalumuialevu Dimuri	Soqosoqo ni Vakavulewa ni Taukei (SVT)	3,646	46.00	3,669	46.29
Iowane Rakai	Fiji Labour Party (FLP)	573	7.23	...	...
Tui Vunibola	Nationalist Vanua Tako Lavo Party (NVTLP)	352	4.44	...	...
Total		7,926	100.00	7,926	100.00

=== 2001 ===
Candidate	Political party	Votes	%
Isireli Leweniqila	Conservative Alliance (CAMV)	4,073	61.34
Ratu Aisea Cavunailoa Katonivere	Soqosoqo Duavata ni Lewenivanua (SDL)	2,567	38.66
Total		6,640	100.00

=== 2006 ===
Candidate	Political party	Votes	%
Isireli Leweniqila	Soqosoqo Duavata ni Lewenivanua (SDL)	7,075	86.84
Samuela Nakete	Fiji Labour Party (FLP)	459	5.63
Erami Biaunisala	Independent	295	3.62
Samuela Wasasala	National Federation Party (NFP)	215	2.64
Savenaca Lario Damudamu	Independent	103	1.26
Total		8,147	100.00

== Sources ==
- Psephos - Adam Carr's electoral archive
- Fiji Facts
