= Eminoni Ranacovu =

Fijian politician

Eminoni Ranacou is a Fijian politician who was appointed to the Senate of Fiji as a representative of Tailevu Province in 2006. He was removed from office by the 2006 Fijian coup d'état.
