= Manasa Vaniqi =

Permanent Secretary for Sugar
- In office 2009 – January 1, 2015
- Preceded by: Position created
- Succeeded by: Parmesh Chand (acting)

Personal details
- Born: c. 1952
- Died: January 1, 2015 Lautoka, Fiji
- Profession: Civil servant

Manasa Ramasirai Vaniqi (c. 1952 – January 1, 2015) was a Fijian civil servant and lieutenant colonel. He was appointed Fiji's first Permanent Secretary for Sugar in 2009. As Permanent Secretary, Vaniqi oversaw reforms within the country's sugar industry. Under Vaniqi, the Ministry created the 2013–2017 Sugar Cane Industry Action Plan, which replaced the older Delloitte Report from New Zealand. Vaniqi also implemented future plans to diversify the focus of the sugar industry into newer, sustainable fields, such as ethanol and bio-gas production, which will be sold to the Fiji Electricity Authority (FEA) if the plans are successful. He met with chiefs and landowners on Vanua Levu and Viti Levu in an effort for increase sugarcane production and renew leases for sugar farmers. Vaniqi served as Permanent Secretary for Sugar from his appointment in 2009 until his death on January 1, 2015.

In 2014, Vaniqi warned against the danger of illegal, indiscriminate burning of sugarcane plantations, telling the Fiji Times, "These people need to realise that about 200,000 people are dependent on the industry and it is the second largest revenue earner for Fiji...In a lot of these cases, the burning was done because of jealousy and because of personal differences, so I would urge everyone to please think of the bigger picture. All indications are that we will harvest more than two million tonnes of cane and produce about 215,000 tonnes of sugar."

In addition to his role as Permanent Secretary for Sugar, Vaniqi was also appointed the Permanent Secretary for Provincial Development and Multi-Ethnic Affairs in 2011.

Vaniqi was a native of Dreketi, Wailevu East, Cakaudrove Province. He was a member of the Republic of Fiji Military Forces territorial force, rising to the rank of lieutenant colonel. Vaniqi had a long career in the Fijian civil service before being appointed as the country's first Permanent Secretary for Sugar in 2009.

He resided in Waqadra in Nadi, Fiji.

Vaniqi died from a short illness in the Intensive Care Unit at Lautoka Hospital in Lautoka, Fiji, on January 1, 2015, at the age of 62. He received a reguregu, the lead-up to the burial, at his home in Waqadra and was awarded a full military funeral.

Parmesh Chand, Fiji's Permanent Secretary for Public Service Commission, was appointed acting Permanent Secretary for Sugar on January 26, 2015, as Vaniqi's successor.
