= Nareish Kumar =

Fijian politician

Member of House of Representatives (Fiji) Labasa Pen Constituency
- In office 1999–2000
- Succeeded by: Poseci Bune

Personal details
- Party: Fiji Labour Party

Nareish Kumar is a Fiji Indian politician who won the Labasa Open Constituency, one of the 25 open seats, for the Fiji Labour Party during the 1999 elections for the House of Representatives.

On 19 May 2000, he was among the 43 members of the People's Coalition Government, led by Mahendra Chaudhry, taken hostage by George Speight and his band of rebel Republic of Fiji Military Forces (RFMF) soldiers from the Counter Revolutionary Warfare Unit. He was released on 23 May 2000.

Now in present times Nareish Kumar is now a school teacher in NSW, Australia.
