= President of the Senate of Fiji =

The President was the presiding officer of the Fijian Senate.

In the 2013 Constitution, the Senate was abolished, and replaced by a single chamber Parliament.

The following persons held the office of President (note that between the first of two military coups in 1987, the Senate did not function until the restoration of constitutional rule in 1992):

Name	Period	Notes
Sir Robert Munro	1970 – 1982	
Wesley M. Barrett	1982 – 1987	
W. J. Clark	1987	
Ratu Tevita Vakalalabure	1992 – 1996	
Josefa Iloilo	1996 – 1999	
Talemo Ratakele	1999 – 2001	
Taito Waqavakatoga	2001 – 2006	
Kinijoji Maivalili	2006	

== See also ==
- Senate of Fiji
- House of Representatives of Fiji
- Speaker of the House of Representatives of Fiji
