= Atonio Leawere =

Fijian politician

Atonio Leawere, or Antonio Leawere, is a Fijian politician. He was a member of the Senate of Fiji and represented Serua.
