= Manasa Tugia =

Fijian politician

Manasa Tugia is a former Fijian politician, who served as Deputy Speaker of the House of Representatives from 2005 to 2006, and as Chairman of Parliament's Justice, Law, and Order Committee. In the latter role, he coordinated hearings into the government's controversial Reconciliation, Tolerance, and Unity (RTU) Bill).

Tugia won the Cakaudrove West Open Constituency for the Conservative Alliance (CAMV) at the parliamentary election of 2001, defeating the incumbent Laitia Toroki of the Soqosoqo ni Vakavulewa ni Taukei (SVT). He was elected Deputy Speaker in June 2005 to succeed Ratu Rakuita Vakalalabure, who was convicted and imprisoned for offences relating to the 2000 Fijian coup d'état.

Tugia was considered one of the more moderate members of a political party widely regarded as strongly nationalistic. In November and December 2005, he advocated watering down the RTU bill, even though several leading members of his own party would seem to benefit from its provisions allowing for amnesty to be extended to the perpetrators of the 2000 coup.

Tugia refused to join the Soqosoqo Duavata ni Lewenivanua Party, into which the CAMV merged in February 2006, and in the general election of 6–13 May, he contested the North East Urban Fijian Communal Constituency as an independent candidate. He was unsuccessful, polling only 353 votes.
