= Wiliame Katonivere =

President of Fiji from 2021 to 2024

Ratu Wiliame Katonivere CF
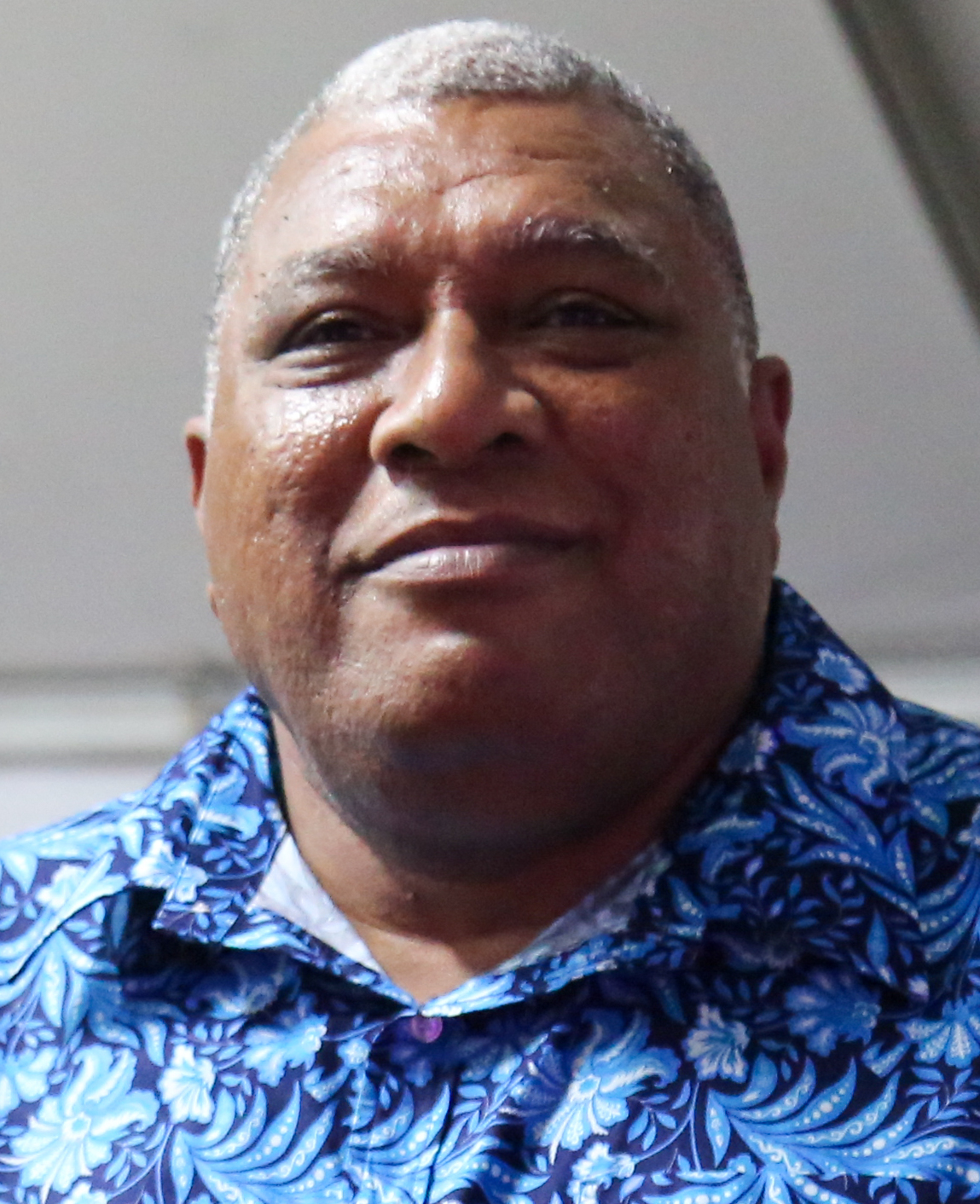
- Katonivere in 2022

6th President of Fiji
- In office 12 November 2021 – 12 November 2024
- Prime Minister: Frank Bainimarama; Sitiveni Rabuka
- Preceded by: Jioji Konrote
- Succeeded by: Naiqama Lalabalavu

Chief of Macuata Province
- Incumbent
- Assumed office 22 May 2013
- Preceded by: Aisea Katonivere

Personal details
- Born: 20 April 1964 (age 62) Suva, Fiji
- Party: People's Alliance; FijiFirst (before)
- Spouse: Filomena Dikumete-Katonivere
- Children: 2

Military service
- Allegiance: Republic of Fiji
- Branch/service: Republic of Fiji Military Forces
- Rank: Lieutenant Colonel

Ratu Wiliame Maivalili Katonivere, CF (pronounced [ɰiliame mɛiβalili katoniβere]; born 20 April 1964) is a Fijian chief and politician who served as the President of Fiji from 2021 to 2024. He has been chief of Macuata Province since 2013, succeeding his older brother Aisea Katonivere; he was previously involved in conservation initiatives of Fiji's Great Sea Reef.

Katonivere has been the chairman of the Pine Group of Companies from 2020 to 2021, which includes Fiji Pine Limited, Tropik Wood Industries Limited and Tropik Wood Products Limited. He is also a board member for Fiji Airports, Fiji Sugar Corporation and Rewa Rice Ltd.

== Military career ==
At 19, Katonivere joined the Royal Fiji Military Forces in 1984 and served two tours in the Middle East under the United Nations Interim Force in Lebanon. He rose to the rank of lieutenant colonel in the Territorial Forces and served as a Commanding officer of the 7th Infantry Regiment of the Territorial Forces.

== Political career ==
Prime Minister Frank Bainimarama nominated Katonivere for President of the Republic of Fiji on 21 October 2021. He accepted the nomination in which Parliament convened the next day to vote on the presidency. Katonivere garnered 28 votes defeating his contender SODELPA MP Teimumu Kepa. Prior in becoming president, Katonivere resigned from all board positions he previously held.

=== Presidency (2021–2024) ===
Katonivere was sworn in as the 6th President of Fiji on 12 November 2021 succeeding Jioji Konrote. At 57, he is the youngest person to have assumed the office. He is the second President to come from the Northern Division (after Ratu Penaia Ganilau). Katonivere took the oath of office in front of Speaker Epeli Nailatikau and was awarded the 100 men Guard of Honour.

On 22 November 2021, Katonivere opened the new session of Parliament and delivered his key note address. He urged all eligible Fijians to be vaccinated against COVID-19 and warned about sudden price hikes in anticipation of borders reopening on 1 December 2021. He also supports the work of government for equality.

On 23 October 2024 he declined to be nominated for a second term as president. His term will end when a new president is elected on 31 October.

== Electoral history ==
=== 2021 Fijian presidential election ===
Katonivere was nominated as the FijiFirst government's candidate for the position of President of Fiji by Prime Minister Frank Bainimarama, while Teimumu Kepa was nominated by Opposition Whip Lynda Tabuya. He was able to gain the support of a majority of MPs in the first round of voting, thus defeating Kepa. An opposition MP, Mosese Bulitavu of SODELPA, had also voted for Katonivere.

Candidate	Party	Parliament	
Candidate	Party	Votes	%
Wiliame Katonivere	FijiFirst	28	54.90%
Teimumu Kepa	SODELPA	23	45.10%
Abstentions and uncast ballots		0	-
Total		51	100.00%
Sources: The Fiji Times

== Personal life ==
Katonivere was born on 20 April 1964 at the Colonial War Memorial Hospital in Suva to Ratu Soso Katonivere and Samanunu Boteiviwa as the youngest out of seven siblings. He attended Draiba Fijian School before completing his secondary education at Bua College in 1981. Katonivere hails from the village of Naduri, Macuata in Vanua Levu. He is married to Filomena Katonivere and they have two children and three grandchildren.

Political offices
Preceded by Jioji Konrote	President of Fiji; 2021–present	Incumbent
