= Tom Ricketts (politician) =

Fijian politician

Tom Ricketts was one of the eight nominees of the Leader of the Opposition to the Senate of Fiji after the 2006 elections.

On 4 January 2008, Ricketts was appointed Interim Minister for Tourism Trade and Communications after Interim Prime Minister Frank Bainimarama's 2008 Cabinet Reshuffle.
