= Rakuita Vakalalabure =

Deputy Speaker of the House of Representatives of Fiji
- In office 2001 – 3 December 2004
- Succeeded by: Manasa Tugia

Member of the Fijian Parliament for Cakaudrove West Fijian
- In office 1 September 2001 – 3 December 2004
- Preceded by: Kinijoji Maivalili
- Succeeded by: Niko Nawaikula

Personal details
- Party: Soqosoqo ni Vakavulewa ni Taukei; Conservative Alliance

Ratu Rakuita Saurara Vakalalabure (born 1962) is a Fijian lawyer and former politician who served as Deputy Speaker of the House of Representatives of Fiji from 2001 to 2004. In August 2004 he was convicted of participation in the 2000 Fijian coup d'état and sentenced to six years' imprisonment. He was the son of Ratu Tevita Vakalalabure, who served in both houses of Parliament from the 1970s to the 1990s.

== Education and early career ==
Vakalalabure studied at the University of the South Pacific for a science degree in 1981 but left in 1983 to join the military and completed six tours of duty with the Fijian Military in South Lebanon reaching the rank of captain in the regular force. He went on to complete a law degree at Bond University in Queensland and post`graduate diploma in legal practice from A.N.U Canberra, Australia. Later received his master's degree in Law [Commercial and corporate law specializing in international trade and finance] from the University of London, England. After returning to Fiji, he served as a state prosecutor for four years under the then-Director of Public Prosecutions, Nazhat Shameem and three years as Legal advisor and Board Secretary for the Civil Aviation Authority of Fiji.

Vakalalabure was also a reserve officer in the Fijian army, following secondment to the`civil service from the regular forces. He was dismissed by Military commander Commodore Frank Bainimarama for insubordination, for refusing to return to barracks while the 2000 coup was in progress.

== Political career and conviction ==
Vakalalabure was first elected to the House of Representatives of Fiji in a by-election in 1999. He was taken hostage in the 2000 Fijian coup d'état and accepted a role as Attorney-General in George Speight's government.

He was re-elected in the 2001 Fijian general election in the Cakaudrove West Fijian Communal Constituency as a candidate for the Conservative Alliance (CAMV).

During the trial of George Speight for treason, pressure grew for others involved in the coup to face justice. In December 2002 the Fiji Law Society charged him with professional misconduct over his role in the 2000 coup, accusing him of sedition and treason. In March 2003 he was accused by the prosecution in Speight's trial of being an integral part of the coup. Later that month he was arrested and charged with taking an illegal oath to commit a capital offence. In April 2003 he was banned from practicing law for professional misconduct. At his trial he claimed he had cooperated with the coup as he thought that Speight had effective control of the country.

On 5 August 2004 he was convicted of taking an unlawful oath and sentenced to six years imprisonment. On 6 December 2004 he was formally expelled from Parliament for nonattendance. The seat was filled without a by-election in June 2005.

Vakalalabure appealed against his sentence, and in June 2006 the Supreme Court reduced it to four years. He was subsequently released to serve the rest of his sentence extramurally.

After completing his sentence Vakalalabure moved to the Cook Islands.
