= Cakaudrove West (Open Constituency, Fiji) =

Former electoral constituency of Fiji

Cakaudrove West Open is a former electoral division of Fiji, one of 25 open constituencies that were elected by universal suffrage (the remaining 46 seats, called communal constituencies, were allocated by ethnicity). Established by the 1997 Constitution, it came into being in 1999 and was used for the parliamentary elections of 1999, 2001, and 2006. It was located in the southeastern part of the northern island of Vanua Levu.

The 2013 Constitution promulgated by the Military-backed interim government abolished all constituencies and established a form of proportional representation, with the entire country voting as a single electorate.

== Election results ==
In the following tables, the primary vote refers to first-preference votes cast. The final vote refers to the final tally after votes for low-polling candidates have been progressively redistributed to other candidates according to pre-arranged electoral agreements (see electoral fusion), which may be customized by the voters (see instant run-off voting).

In the 1999 election, Sitiveni Rabuka won with more than 50 percent of the primary vote; therefore, there was no redistribution of preferences.

=== 1999 ===
Candidate	Party	Votes	%
Sitiveni Rabuka	SVT	9,190	69.92
Aisake Kubuabola	VLV	1,936	14.73
Epeli Ligamamada	FAP	1,574	11.98
Mosese Gere	NVTLP	443	3.37
Total		13,143	100.00
Registered voters/turnout		13,143	–
SVT win			

=== 2001 ===
Candidate	Party	First preferences		Final preferences	
Candidate	Party	Votes	%	Votes	%
Manasa Tugia	CAMV	5,362	44.58	8,007	66.54
Laitia Toroki	SVT	3,864	32.12	4,027	33.46
Maciu Cerewale	SDL	2,803	23.30		
Total		12,029	100.00	12,034	100.00
Registered voters/turnout		12,034	–		
CAMV gain from SVT					

=== 2006 ===
Candidate	Party	Votes	%
Osea Vakalalabure	SDL	8,409	59.38
Saliceni Gonelevu	Labour	2,369	16.73
Peni Naulu	Independent	1,544	10.90
Ini Tubui	SDL	698	4.93
Aporosa Tuikoroalau	Independent	540	3.81
Gilbert Vakalalabure	Independent	511	3.61
Solomone Catarogo	PANU	91	0.64
Total		14,162	100.00
Registered voters/turnout		14,152	–
SDL gain from CAMV			

== Sources ==
- Psephos - Adam Carr's electoral archive
- Fiji Facts
