= Hafizud Deen Khan =

Fijian politician and businessman (died 2022)

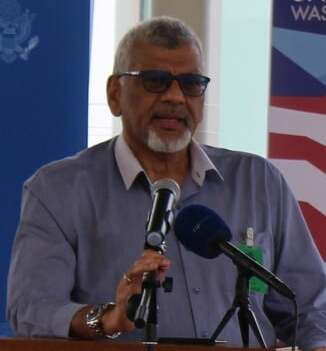

Senator of Fijian Senate
- In office 22 August 2005 – 5 December 2006

Personal details
- Born: 1950 Suva, Colony of Fiji, British Empire
- Died: 3 July 2022 (aged 71–72)

Hafizud Dean Khan (1950–2022) was a Fijian politician and businessman who was the president of the Fiji Muslim League. He was also a former Senator and he served as the vice-president of the Senate of Fiji.

== Political career ==
Khan was appointed to the Senate of Fiji on 13 July 2005 to fill a vacancy caused by the death of Dr Ahmed Ali. Khan became one of the 9 out of 32 Senators nominated by the Prime Minister. Khan was formally sworn in on 22 August 2005. In June 2006, he became vice-president of the Senate of Fiji and served in this capacity until the Senate was forcibly dissolved one day after the military coup of 5 December 2006. On 14 October 2005, Khan launched a national appeal for funds to assist with relief efforts in the wake of the devastating earthquake that struck Kashmir, on the Pakistan border on 8 October 2005.

He served as a Senator and Vice-President of the Senate in the Parliament of Fiji.

He received a "Lifetime Achievement Award" for service to the tourism industry in 2011 at the AON Fiji Tourism Excellence Awards.

He was a Life Member of Fiji Hotel and Tourism Association and was the Trustee of Fiji Commerce and Employers Federation.

In 1907, he was awarded the "officier De L' Ordre National Du Merite" by the President of the Republic of France, for his services to the Private Sector in the Region.

In 2017, he was presented with "Officer of the Order of Fiji "medal by His Excellency, The President of Fiji.

== Business ==
He worked for 12 and half years as commercial and corporate banker, locally and Internationally with Citibank NA and Bank of British Columbia. He returned to Fiji in 1982 and set up his own business, as financial and business consultant. He diversified as a developer from late 1983 as Hexagon Group of Companies. He remained the Chairman of the Group. Over the years the Group has developed a number of residential, multi-unit accommodation complexes, motels and hotels. The Group was the original developer of Tokatoka Resort, and co-developer of Trendwest, which later became Worldmark by Wyndham. The Hexagon Group has previously owned /operated Melanesian Hotel, Seashell at Momi and Grand Eastern Hotel in Labasa.

Currently, The Hexagon Group owns /operates Suva Motor Inn, Hexagon International Hotel Villas and Spa and, Grand Wests Villas in Nadi. It has recently completed the 1st Stage of a multi-million dollar integrated tourism property "Yadua Bay Resort and Villas" on the Coral Coast. This new central resort (with a 4.5-star hotel and ancillary facilities and individual villas) has been in operation from June 2019. Once fully developed, Yadua Bay Resort and Villas will boast villas/townhouses on 89 individually owned lots, with varied mix of accommodation choices, having the flexibility to accommodate more than 250 units.

The Group is also completing by November 2019: "Vitivou Estates" at Davuilevu, Nausori, offering a commercial complex with multiple shops, service station, a modern function centre with seating capacity for up to 600 people, and 146 freehold residential lots. A number of other integrated commercial facilities are also planned for this strategically located site, on the new Kings four-lane highway, and minutes from Nausori town and airport.

He has served as director and adviser to various private companies and government/statutory bodies. He has served as Chief Administrator for Nausori Town Council, Board member of Fiji Development Bank, has served as Board member and Deputy Chairman of Fiji Electricity Authority. He has served as a Board Member, Vice Chairman and Chairman of Fiji Sugar Corporation. He also served, for several years, as President of Fiji Hotel Association and President of Fiji Employers' Federation. He has been on various committees, councils and advisory boards, at national level. He was one of the founding members of PIPSO (Pacific Islands Private Sector Organisation) and served as the Chairman for three and a half years.

He has served in various capacities with Fiji Muslim League, since 1985. He was speaker of FML for 8 years and has been its National President since 2001. In 2014 he was appointed External Member of General Committee of Islamic Development Bank in Jeddah, Saudi Arabia. He was one of the three Vice Presidents of RISEAP (Regional Islamic Dawah Council of Asia and Pacific).

On 3 July 2022, Fiji Muslim League had announced the death of its president, Haji Hafizud Dean Khan. He was buried at Enamanu Cemetery in Nadi.
