= Isireli Leweniqila =

Fijian politician

Isireli Leweniqila is a former Fijian politician, who served in the Cabinet as Minister for Information and Communications.

A former businessman and farmer, Isireli Leweniqila is the son of the veteran politician, Militoni Leweniqila.

Educated at Dudley High School and Ratu Kadavulevu School before completing a Bachelor of Arts degree at the University of the South Pacific. While a student at the Ratu Kadavulevu School, Leweniqila proved a very keen athlete, winning the intermediate boys' 800 meters race.

Leweniqila was elected to the House of Representatives in the 1999 election, winning the North East Urban for the Soqosoqo ni Vakavulewa ni Taukei Party (SVT). Following a split in the SVT, he won the Macuata Fijian Communal Constituency for the Conservative Alliance in the general election of 2001, and was subsequently appointed to the coalition Cabinet as Minister for Youth, Employment Opportunities, and Sports.

In 2005, he was acquitted on charges of having been involved in the Fiji coup of 2000. Following the merger of his CAMV into the Soqosoqo Duavata ni Lewenivanua Party (SDL) in February 2006, Leweniqila retained his seat at the parliamentary election held on 6–13 May 2006, and subsequently assumed his present ministerial portfolios.
