= Senate of Fiji =

Former upper house of Fiji, abolished in 2013

The Senate of Fiji was the upper chamber of Parliament. It was abolished by the 2013 Constitution of Fiji, after a series of military coups. It was the less powerful of the two chambers; it could not initiate legislation, but could amend or veto it. The Senate's powers over financial bills were more restricted: it could veto them in their entirety, but could not amend them. The House of Representatives could override a senatorial veto by passing the bill a second time in the parliamentary session immediately following the one in which it was rejected by the Senate, after a minimum period of six months. Amendments to the Constitution were excepted: the veto of the Senate was absolute. Following the passage of a bill by the House of Representatives, the Senate had 21 days (7 days in the case of a bill classified as "urgent") to approve, amend, or reject it; if at the expiry of that period the Senate had done nothing about it, it was deemed to have passed the bill.

== Composition ==
The Senate had 32 members. Formally, they were appointed by the president for five-year terms coinciding with the term of the House of Representatives. Constitutionally, however, the president was required to accept the nominees of specified institutions. Fourteen senators were chosen by the Bose Levu Vakaturaga (Great Council of Chiefs), though in practice it had chosen to delegate this prerogative to Fiji's 14 provincial councils, each choosing one senator. A further nine senators were chosen by the prime minister and eight by the leader of the opposition. The one remaining senator was selected by the Council of Rotuma, a Fijian dependency.

From among their own members, the senators used to elect a president and vice-president, whose roles were similar to those of the speaker and deputy speaker of the House of Representatives, respectively. As of September 2006, the president of the Senate was Ratu Kinijoji Maivalili; the vice-president was Hafiz Khan. They were chosen in June 2006 to replace Taito Waqavakatoga and Kenneth Low, both of whom had retired from the Senate.

The built-in near-majority of Fijian chiefs in the Senate gave them an effective veto over contentious social legislation, as well as constitutional amendments, provided they voted as a block, as they would almost certainly be joined by enough other senators to muster a majority. In addition, any changes to clauses of the constitution guaranteeing indigenous Fijian ownership and control of most of the land had to be approved by 9 of the 14 senators chosen by the Great Council of Chiefs, as well as by a majority in the Senate as a whole.

Senators, like their fellow-parliamentarians from the House of Representatives, could be appointed to the Cabinet – the executive arm of government.

== History ==
The Fijian Senate came into being in 1972, when the old unicameral Legislative Council was replaced by the bicameral Parliament. The Senate was restructured twice after the original constitutional structures went into effect.

From 1972 to 1987, the Senate consisted of 22 members. Appointed by the governor-general on the nomination of the Great Council of Chiefs (8), the prime minister (7), the leader of the opposition (6), and the council of Rotuma (1), senators served six-year terms, with half retiring every three years. The first term of office for half of the nominees of the Great Council of Chiefs and of the leader of the opposition, three of the seven nominees of the prime minister, and the lone Rotuman senator, was for three years only, ending in 1975. The Senate was a permanent body; it was never dissolved.

The Constitution was rewritten following two military coups in 1987. The Senate was expanded to 34 members appointed by the president for four-year terms, with half retiring every two years. The president appointed 24 senators on the nomination of the Great Council of Chiefs, 1 on the nomination of the Council of Rotuma, and a further 9 at his own discretion from the Indo-Fijian and minority communities. This arrangement was in effect from 1992 to 1999. The first term of 12 of the 24 senators nominated by the Great Council of Chiefs and 4 of the 9 appointed to represent other communities was for two years only, ending in 1994. As previously, the Senate was never dissolved.

Constitutional arrangements came into effect in 1997–1998, and the first Senate so appointed took office in 1999. For the first time, all senators served concurrent, five-year terms, coinciding with the term of the House of Representatives.

== Membership ==
As of 28 September 2006, the Fijian Senate comprised the following persons:

=== Nominated by the Great Council of Chiefs ===
.	Senator	Province
	Ratu Solomone Bauserau	Naitasiri
	Isaia Gonewai	Nadroga-Navosa
	Atunaisa Kaloumairai	Lomaiviti
	Ratu Aisea Katonivere	Macuata
	Atonio Leawere	Serua
	Ratu Kinijoji R. Maivalili	Cakaudrove
	Adi Laufitu Malani	Ra
	Adi Koila Mara Nailatikau	Lau
	Eminoni Ranacovu	Tailevu
	Ratu Manoa Rasigatale	Rewa
	Asesela Sadole	Ba
	Matareti Sarasau	Kadavu
	Ratu Kiniviliame Taukeinikoro	Namosi
	Ratu Kinijioji Vakawaletabua	Bua

=== Nominated by the prime minister ===
Tupeni Baba
Qoriniasi Bale
Ratu Jone Bouwalu
Adi Samanunu Cakobau-Talakuli
Hafiz Khan
Dixon Seeto
Kaliopate Tavola
Ratu Jekesoni Yavalanavanua
Adi Lagamu Vuiyasawa

=== Nominated by the leader of the opposition ===
Gaffar Ahmed
Jokapeci Talei Koroi
Vijay Nair
Lavenia Padarath
Bijai Prasad
Tom Rickets
Sachida Nand Sharma
Chandra Singh

=== Nominated by the Council of Rotuma ===
John Fatiaki

== See also ==
- President of the Senate of Fiji

== Notes ==
Source: Fiji Parliamentary website, supplemented from the Hansard records.
