= Cakaudrove Province =

Province of Fiji

Coordinates: 16.6748699°S 179.2409699°E

- Province
- Interactive map of Cakaudrove Province
- Country: Fiji
- Division: Northern Division

Area
  - Total: 2,816 km^{2} (1,087 sq mi)

Population (2017)
  - Total: 50,447
  - Density: 17.91/km^{2} (46.40/sq mi)

Cakaudrove (Fijian pronunciation: [ðaˈkɔuɳɖʳoβe]) is one of fourteen provinces of Fiji, and one of three based principally on the northern island of Vanua Levu, occupying the south-eastern third of the island and including the nearby islands of Taveuni, Rabi, Kioa, and numerous other islands in the Vanua Levu Group. It has a total land area of 2,816 square kilometers, with a population of 50,447 at the most recent census in 2017, making it the seventh most populous province. The only major town is Savusavu, with a population of 5,494 in 2017.

== Politics ==
Cakaudrove has proved to be one of Fiji's most influential provinces. Ratu Sir Penaia Ganilau, Fiji's last Governor-General and first President, held the chiefly title of Tui Cakau, with Cakaudrove as his traditional fiefdom. Former Prime Minister Sitiveni Rabuka is also from Cakaudrove. The present Tui Cakau, Ratu Naiqama Lalabalavu, is serving as the President of Fiji. The CAMV politicians Ratu Rakuita Vakalalabure and Manasa Tugia also hail from Cakaudrove. Ratu Epeli Ganilau, a son of Ratu Sir Penaia Ganilau leads another significant political party, the National Alliance Party. Ratu Jone Yavala Kubuabola is Fiji's Minister for Finance, a position he has held since 2000. He also represents the South West Urban Fijian Communal constituencies in the House of Representatives, to which he was elected as a candidate of the Soqosoqo Duavata ni Lewenivanua (SDL) in 2001. He was also a former Governor of the Reserve Bank of Fiji. Ratu Inoke Kubuabola is a Fijian politician who served as Leader of the Opposition in 1999 and 2000. He became leader of the Soqosoqo ni Vakavulewa ni Taukei (SVT) following its defeat in the 1999 election and the subsequent resignation of its leader, the defeated Prime Minister Sitiveni Rabuka, from Parliament. The Kubuabola family is a branch of the Ai Sokula clan, to which the present Tui Cakau and former Cabinet Minister Ratu Naiqama Lalabalavu also belongs.

Cakaudrove is administered by the Cakaudrove Provincial Council.

== Archaeological sites ==
The village of Dakuniba is noted for the Ndakunimba Stones, the remains of a giant monolith carved with petroglyphs.

== Demographics ==
=== 2017 Census ===
Tikina (District)	Ethnicity						Total
Tikina (District)	iTaukei	%	Indo-Fijian	%	Other	%	Total
Cakaudrove	11,759	80.5	1,939	13.3	901	6.2	14,599
Nasavusavu	9,159	72.7	2,820	22.4	613	4.9	12,592
Rabi	160	6.9	17	0.7	2,157	92.4	2,334
Saqani	1,978	97.2	9	0.4	47	2.3	2,034
Tunuloa	3,790	98.6	23	0.6	30	0.8	3,843
Vaturova	3,206	76.4	963	23.0	27	0.6	4,196
Wailevu	5,663	89.0	627	9.9	73	1.1	6,363
Wainikeli	4,125	92.0	243	5.4	118	2.6	4,486
Province	39,840	79.0	6,641	13.2	3,966	7.9	50,447
