= Samanunu Cakobau-Talakuli =

Fijian chief, politician, and diplomat

Adi Litia Samanunu Cakobau-Talakuli (1940–2012) was a Fijian chief, politician, and diplomat.

== Biography ==
The eldest child of Ratu Sir George Cakobau (the late Vunivalu of Bau and Governor-General), Talakuli held a number of senior positions in the Fijian government. She was Minister for iTaukei Affairs in 1994 and 1995, and was considered as a candidate for the Vice-Presidency in 1997. She became Fiji's High Commissioner to Malaysia and Ambassador to Thailand and the Economic and Social Commission for Asia and the Pacific in 1999

Appointed to the Fijian Senate in June 2006 as one of nine nominees of the Fijian government, Talakuli was also appointed to the Cabinet as a Minister without portfolio. As the eldest child of the last Vunivalu of Bau, she was considered the most senior chief of the Kubuna Confederacy; however, she was not a member of the Bose Levu Vakaturaga.

== Personal life ==
Talakuli was the eldest child of Ratu Sir George Cakobau (the late 11th Vunivalu of Bau and Governor-General). Her siblings include Ratu Epenisa Cakobau (half-brother), Ratu George Cakobau, Jr. and Adi Litia Cakobau. She married Manasa Talakuli, who was the first Fijian to be commissioned in the British Army.

== Death ==
Talakuli died in 2012 at her home.
