= Asenaca Caucau =

Fijian politician

Adi Asenaca Coboiverata Caucau, generally known simply as Adi Asenaca Caucau, is a Fijian politician. She served as Minister For Women and Minister for Social Welfare and Poverty Alleviation from 2001 to 2006, when she became Minister of State for Housing. She held this post, and continued to represent the Tailevu South Lomaiviti Open Constituency in the House of Representatives until 5 December 2006, when the Military of Fiji staged a coup d'état and removed her government from office. She had first won the seat for the Soqosoqo Duavata ni Lewenivanua Party (SDL) in the parliamentary election of September 2001.

== Political controversies ==
Caucau is one of Fiji's most colourful politicians. A flamboyant figure, she is sometimes careless with her words and her outspokenness has frequently generated controversy. She has defended herself by claiming that journalists have often unfairly quoted her "out of context."

=== "Indo-Fijians are like weeds" ===
On July 28, 2002, addressing Parliament, Caucau stated:

"A priest warned me that we must keep a careful and guarded watch over fellow Indo-Fijians because they are like weeds. They tend to push to grab to take over the land and the nation. [...] [T]his is what we, the indigenous people have proven and believe is the design of the foreigners [vulagi]."

The term vulagi is a common slur against Indo-Fijians. Opposition members, journalists, trade unionists, non-governmental organisations and religious leaders called upon Prime Minister Laisenia Qarase to condemn Caucau's racist comment, and discipline her.

Qarase refused to rebuke her publicly, saying that ruling on the propriety of her comments was the Parliamentary Speaker's prerogative, not his. "He decides whatever goes in the House and I have left the matter with him," Qarase said. Former Prime Minister Sitiveni Rabuka, however, condemned her remarks and called on the Prime Minister to discipline her. "Caucau's statements were irresponsible and unbecoming, especially from a woman who prays before making a statement," Rabuka said. He called on her to apologise to the Indo-Fijian community. Responding to calls for an apology, Caucau insisted that she saw nothing offensive about her statement. "I am simply stating a fact and it was not meant to be racist", she told the media.

=== Disagreements with the Military ===
On 14 April 2003, Radio New Zealand reported that Radio Fiji had quoted the Military commander, Commodore Frank Bainimarama, as having called for her resignation, following her open disagreement with military moves to prosecute perpetrators of the coup d'état which deposed the elected government in May 2000. Caucau had expressed sympathy for some of the individuals imprisoned for their involvement in the coup, and had attempted to visit the chief instigator, George Speight at his Nukulau Island prison, later saying that she wanted to pray with him and the prisoners.

=== Call for journalists to be "responsible" ===
Caucau, who worked as journalist herself whilst pursuing her university studies in Nebraska in the United States, has periodically attacked the media for what she considers to be biased journalism. For the second time in less than a year, she declared at a workshop in Nabua in late January 2005 that reporters should be more sensitive when reporting incidents of violence against women, she said, and claimed to have been a frequent victim of journalists quoting her out of context. On the whole, journalists should attempt to focus a lot more on positive rather than negative news, she maintained. "I ask the media to concentrate on positive things rather than just doing the rounds on rape, incest, molestation on women," she said. "There seems to be a lot of love-hate relationships in Fiji today, between so many and the media, simply because there are so many negative reporting and a serious lack of understanding on journalists' part on working on reports or their stories," she added. Caucau likened negative journalism to "a bad wound that can fester and spread a nasty smell." She said that journalists should be held accountable for the reports they produced. She was reiterating earlier comments she had made at the Pacific Regional Office for the United Nations Development Fund for Women (UNIFEM) and AusAID.

=== Human trafficking allegations ===
Caucau found herself embroiled in controversy when she claimed at a workshop on violence against children on 27 September 2005 that fathers throughout Fiji have been selling their daughters into prostitution in a "readily available" human trafficking market. Her allegations came on top of claims by Opposition Senator Ponipate Lesavua that teenage prostitution was commonplace. Leader Mick Beddoes of the United Peoples Party and Kamlesh Arya, president of the Hindu Arya Pratindhi Sabha organization said that her claims were very serious, and that she should substantiate them with real facts. Beddoes called for a police investigation.

=== "Beggars are well-off" ===
Caucau made headlines again on 7 November 2005, claiming that many beggars were imposters, and were in fact professionals with homes, food and shelter. According to Caucau, all beggars except the mentally disabled received family allowances of up to F$100 per month, which put them above the poverty line. She later dismissed reports on indigenous poverty, and called squatters "thieves".

== Clash with Cakobau ==
The decision of the SDL Party to renominate Caucau for the parliamentary election, which was duly held on 6–13 May 2006, was sharply criticized by Ratu George Cakobau, scion of Tailevu's most senior chiefly family and son of former Governor-General Ratu Sir George Cakobau. The Fiji Village news service quoted him on 18 March as saying that she had done nothing for the people of Tailevu. The SDL disregarded his advice, and Caucau went on to retain her seat by a large majority.

== Arrested in the United States ==
In July 2008, Caucau was arrested in the United States and charged with having committed an "assault with a deadly weapon" in San Francisco after hitting a man with a shoe. The charge was dismissed in August 2008.

== Christian ==
Caucau is the daughter of the Reverend Ratu Isireli Caucau, a former President of the Methodist Church. Caucau herself espouses fervent Christian beliefs, claims never to make a statement without praying first, preferably with her advisers, and frequently preaches.

Caucau's religious convictions strongly flavour her social views. She has spoken out strongly in favour of campaigns to discourage premarital sex, claiming that single mothers are among the most vulnerable members of society and are frequently abused. She has also strongly opposed calls from some quarters to legalize prostitution, saying that it corrupts morals. In early October 2004, she claimed about half of all Members of Parliament were clients of prostitutes, but refused to name any names.
