= List of recipients of the Royal Victorian Chain =

Below is a list of recipients of the Royal Victorian Chain:

== Edward VII (1902–1910) ==
Image	Name	Date conferred	Notes
	George, Prince of Wales KG KT KP GCMG GCVO PC	1902	Later George V
	Prince Arthur, Duke of Connaught and Strathearn KG KT KP GCB GCSI GCMG GCIE GCVO PC	1902	
	Frederick, Crown Prince of Denmark KG GCB GCVO	1902	Later Frederick VIII, King of Denmark
	Prince Charles of Denmark GCB GCVO	1902	Later Haakon VII, King of Norway
	Constantine, Crown Prince of Greece GCB	1902	Later Constantine I, King of the Hellenes
	Prince Henry of Prussia KG GCB	1902	Revoked in 1915
	John Campbell, 9th Duke of Argyll KT GCMG GCVO PC	1902	
	Ernst Louis, Grand Duke of Hesse and by Rhine KG GCB	1902	Revoked in 1915
	Prince Christian of Schleswig-Holstein KG GCVO PC ADC	1902	
	Alexander Duff, 1st Duke of Fife KT GCVO PC	1902	
	Wilhelm II, German Emperor KG GCVO	1902	Revoked in 1915
	Carlos I, King of Portugal and the Algarves KG	1902	
	Frederick Temple	1902	Archbishop of Canterbury
	George Curzon, 1st Baron Curzon of Kedleston GCSI GCIE	1903	Viceroy of India; Later 1st Earl Curzon of Kedleston; Later 1st Marquess Curzon of Kedleston
	Victor Emmanuel III, King of Italy KG	1903	Revoked in 1941
	Nicholas II, Emperor of All Russia KG GCB	6 September 1904	
	Franz Joseph I, Emperor of Austria KG	6 September 1904	Revoked in 1915
	Christian IX, King of Denmark KG GCB	1904	
	Wilhelm, German Crown Prince KG	1904	Revoked in 1915
	Alfonso XIII, King of Spain KG GCVO	9 June 1905	
	Abbas II, Khedive of Egypt and Sudan GCB GCMG GCVO	15 June 1905	
	George I, King of the Hellenes KG GCVO	1 December 1905	
	Henry Petty-Fitzmaurice, 5th Marquess of Lansdowne KG GCSI GCMG GCIE	22 December 1905	
	Prince Arthur of Connaught KG GCVO	15 May 1906	
	Gustaf V, King of Sweden KG GCB	5 May 1908	
	Armand Fallières	29 May 1908	President of the French Republic

== George V (1910–1936) ==
Image	Name	Date conferred	Notes
	Randall Davidson GCVO	23 June 1911	Archbishop of Canterbury; Later 1st Baron Davidson of Lambeth
	Henry Fitzalan-Howard, 15th Duke of Norfolk KG GCVO	23 June 1911	Earl Marshal
	Robert Crewe-Milnes, 1st Marquess of Crewe KG	13 February 1912	Secretary of State for India
	Charles Hardinge, 1st Baron Hardinge of Penshurst GCB GCSI GCMG GCIE GCVO ISO	13 February 1912	Viceroy of India
	Archibald Primrose, 5th Earl of Rosebery KG KT PC	4 June 1917	Former Prime Minister
	Prince Higashifushimi Yorihito GCVO	28 October 1918	On the occasion of the Prince's visit to Buckingham Palace to present King George V with the Japanese honorific of Gensui and its accompanying badge and sword
	Edward, Prince of Wales KG GCSI GCMG GCIE GCVO MC PC ADC	1921	Later Edward VIII; Later Duke of Windsor
	Cosmo Gordon Lang	26 April 1923	Archbishop of Canterbury; Later 1st Baron Lang of Lambeth
	Gustaf Adolf, Crown Prince of Sweden GCB GCVO	1923	Later Gustaf VI Adolf, King of Sweden
	Richard Curzon, 4th Earl Howe GCVO TD JP	1925	Former Lord Chamberlain to Queen Alexandra
	Amānullāh Khān, King of Afghanistan	1928	
	Nobuhito, Prince Takamatsu	1930	Revoked in 1942
	Haile Selassie I, Emperor of Ethiopia GCB GCMG GCVO	1930	
	Prince Henry, Duke of Gloucester KG GCVO	3 June 1932	
	William Cavendish-Bentinck, 6th Duke of Portland KG GCVO PC	13 June 1932	
	Paul, Prince Regent of Yugoslavia GCVO	1934	
	Umberto, Prince of Piedmont	1935	Later Umberto II, King of Italy
	Edward Stanley, 17th Earl of Derby KG GCB GCVO PC	1935	
	Alexander Cambridge, 1st Earl of Athlone KG GCB DSO GCVO PC ADC	1935	Born Prince Alexander of Teck
	Rowland Baring, 2nd Earl of Cromer GCB GCIE GCVO PC	3 June 1935	Lord Chamberlain of the Household
	Prince George, Duke of Kent KG KT GCMG GCVO	1 January 1936	

== Edward VIII (1936) ==
Image	Name	Date conferred	Notes
Edward VIII conferred the Chain on no-one during his reign

== George VI (1936–1952) ==
Image	Name	Date conferred	Notes
	Yasuhito, Prince Chichibu	1937	
	Queen Elizabeth LG CI GCVO GBE	11 May 1937	Later Queen Elizabeth The Queen Mother
	Queen Mary LG VA CI GCSI GCVO GBE RRC	11 May 1937	
	Clive Wigram, 1st Baron Wigram GCB GCVO CSI PC	11 May 1937	Former Private Secretary to the Sovereign
	Leopold III, King of the Belgians KG GCVO	1937	
	James Hamilton, 3rd Duke of Abercorn KG KP	10 August 1945	Governor of Northern Ireland
	Mir Osman Ali Khan, Asaf Jah VII GCSI GBE	1 January 1946	Nizam of Hyderabad
	Mohammad Reza Pahlavi, Shah of Iran	21 July 1948	
	Geoffrey Fisher	1 January 1949	Archbishop of Canterbury; Later Baron Fisher of Lambeth
	Sir John Weir GCVO	9 June 1949	
	Juliana, Queen of the Netherlands	1950	

== Elizabeth II (1952–2022) ==
Image	Name	Date conferred	Notes
	George Villiers, 6th Earl of Clarendon KG GCMG GCVO PC DL	24 October 1952	Former Lord Chamberlain of the Household
	Bernard Fitzalan-Howard, 16th Duke of Norfolk KG GCVO PC DL	1 June 1953	Earl Marshal
	Henry Somerset, 10th Duke of Beaufort KG GCVO PC	1 June 1953	Master of the Horse
	Olav, Crown Prince of Norway GCB GCVO	1955	Later Olav V, King of Norway
	Faisal II, King of Iraq GCVO	1955	
	Francisco Craveiro Lopes	1957	President of the Portuguese Republic
	Frederik IX, King of Denmark KG GCB GCVO	1957	
	Vincent Massey CH CD	29 July 1960	Governor General of Canada
	Bhumibol Adulyadej, King of Thailand	1960	
	Charles de Gaulle	1960	President of the French Republic
	Mahendra, King of Nepal	1961	
	Roger Lumley, 11th Earl of Scarbrough KG GCSI GCIE GCVO TD PC DL	1 January 1963	Former Lord Chamberlain of the Household
	Douglas Douglas-Hamilton, 14th Duke of Hamilton KT GCVO AFC	3 March 1964	Former Lord Steward of the Household
	Amha Selassie, Crown Prince of Ethiopia GCMG GBE	1965	
	Hussein I, King of Jordan GCVO	1966	
	Ayub Khan GCMG MBE	1966	President of the Islamic Republic of Pakistan
	Faisal, King of Saudi Arabia	1967	
	Sir Michael Adeane GCB GCVO	29 March 1972	Former Private Secretary to the Sovereign; Later Baron Adeane
	Mohammed Zahir Shah, King of Afghanistan	1972	
	Roland Michener PC CC CMM CD QC	3 August 1973	Governor General of Canada
	Michael Ramsey, Baron Ramsey of Canterbury	19 November 1974	Former Archbishop of Canterbury
	Margrethe II, Queen of Denmark	1974	Abdicated in 2024
	Birendra, King of Nepal	1975	
	Carl XVI Gustaf, King of Sweden	1975	
	Donald Coggan, Baron Coggan PC	14 March 1980	Former Archbishop of Canterbury
	Khalid, King of Saudi Arabia	1981	
	Ratu Sir George Cakobau GCMG OBE	30 October 1982	Governor-General of Fiji
	Beatrix, Queen of the Netherlands GCVO	1982	Abdicated in 2013
	Charles Maclean, Baron Maclean KT GCVO KBE PC	29 November 1984	Former Lord Chamberlain of the Household
	António Ramalho Eanes GCB	1985	President of the Portuguese Republic
	Juan Carlos I, King of Spain	1986	Abdicated in 2014
	Fahd, King of Saudi Arabia	1987	
	The Princess Margaret, Countess of Snowdon CI GCVO CD	21 August 1990	
	Robert Runcie, Baron Runcie MC PC	1991	Former Archbishop of Canterbury
	Martin Charteris, Baron Charteris of Amisfield GCB GCVO OBE QSO PC	10 July 1992	Former Private Secretary to the Sovereign
	François Mitterrand GCB	1992	President of the French Republic
	Richard von Weizsäcker	1992	Federal President of the Federal Republic of Germany
	Harald V, King of Norway GCVO	1994	
	David Ogilvy, 13th Earl of Airlie KT GCVO PC	17 December 1997	Former Lord Chamberlain of the Household
	Miles Fitzalan-Howard, 17th Duke of Norfolk KG CB CBE MC DL	1 November 2000	Earl Marshal
	George Carey, Baron Carey of Clifton PC	29 October 2002	Former Archbishop of Canterbury
	The Prince Philip, Duke of Edinburgh KG KT OM GBE PC AC QSO	20 November 2007	
	Abdullah, King of Saudi Arabia	2007	
	Qaboos, Sultan of Oman GCB GCMG GCVO	2010	
	Rowan Williams PC	4 October 2012	Former Archbishop of Canterbury; Later Baron Williams of Oystermouth
	William Peel, 3rd Earl Peel GCVO PC DL	13 April 2021	Former Lord Chamberlain of the Household

== Charles III (2022–present) ==
Image	Name	Date conferred	Notes
Charles III has thus far conferred the Chain on no-one during his reign
