= Litia Cakobau =

Fijian Chief and politician (1941–2019)

Adi Litia Cakobau
- Born: 1941
- Died: October 8, 2019 (aged 77–78); Lautoka
- Occupation: political leader
- Office: Cabinet of Fiji; Senate of Fiji
- Father: George Cakobau
- Relatives: Samanunu Cakobau-Talakuli (sister); George Cakobau Jr. (brother)

Adi Litia Qalirea Cakobau (c. 1941 – 8 October 2019) was a Bau high Fijian chief and political leader.

== Biography ==
Cakobau, the daughter of Ratu Sir George Cakobau, who was Fiji's Governor-General from 1973 to 1983, was appointed to the Senate in 2001 as one of nine nominees of the Fijian government. She held this post till 2006, when her elder sister, Adi Samanunu Cakobau-Talakuli was appointed to the Senate.

Prior to her appointment to the Senate, she had previously held Cabinet office as Minister for Women, a post to which she was appointed in 1987.

Her brother, Ratu George Cakobau Jr., was also a Senator from 2001 to 2006, but was nominated by the Great Council of Chiefs rather than the government, as she was. She died at her home in Lautoka in October 2019 at the age of 78.
