= Dominion of Fiji =

Oceanian country from 1970 to 1987

Fiji
- 1970–1987
- Flag Coat of arms
- Motto: "Rerevaka na Kalou ka Doka na Tui" "Fear God and honour the Queen"
- Anthem: God Bless Fiji
- Capital: Suva; 18°10′S 178°27′E
- Government: Unitary parliamentary constitutional monarchy
- Monarch
  - 1970–1987: Elizabeth II
- Governor-General
  - 1970–1973: Sir Robert Sidney Foster
  - 1973–1983: Ratu Sir George Cakobau
  - 1983–1987: Ratu Sir Penaia Ganilau
- Prime Minister
  - 1970–1987: Ratu Sir Kamisese Mara
  - 1987: Timoci Bavadra
- Legislature: Parliament
  - Upper house: Senate
  - Lower house: House of Representatives
- Historical era: Cold War
  - Independence: 10 October 1970
  - Republic proclaimed: 6 October 1987
- Currency: Fijian dollar
- Calling code: 679
Preceded by	Succeeded by
Colony of Fiji	Fiji
- Today part of: Fiji

Fiji, (Note: Fiji was sometimes informally referred to as the Dominion of Fiji to emphasise the independent state's ties to the British Crown, but the official name of the state was simply "Fiji". The term Dominion was deprecated by 1970 in favour of Commonwealth realm.) also known as the Dominion of Fiji, was an independent state from 1970 to 1987, a Commonwealth realm in which the British monarch, Elizabeth II, remained head of state as Queen of Fiji, represented by the Governor-General. The state was the successor of the British Colony of Fiji which was given independence in October 1970 and it survived until the Republic of Fiji was proclaimed on 6 October 1987 after two military coups, at which time Queen Elizabeth II was removed as head of state, albeit, without any consent from the people of Fiji themselves.

During this time, Fiji's highest court was the Judicial Committee of the Privy Council, which was above the Supreme Court of Fiji in the Fijian judicial system.

== History ==
=== Decolonisation ===
After the Second World War, Fiji began to take its first steps towards internal self-government. The Legislative Council was expanded to 32 members in 1953, 15 of them elected and divided equally among the three major ethnic constituencies (indigenous Fijians, Indo-Fijians, and Europeans). Ratu Sukuna was chosen as the first Speaker. Although the Legislative Council still had few of the powers of the modern Parliament, it brought native Fijians and Indo-Fijians into the official political structure for the first time, and fostered the beginning of a modern political culture in Fiji.

These steps towards self-rule were welcomed by the Indo-Fijian community, which by that time had come to outnumber the native Fijian population. Fearing Indo-Fijian domination, many Fijian chiefs saw the benevolent rule of the British as preferable to Indo-Fijian control and resisted British moves towards autonomy. By this time, however, the United Kingdom had apparently decided to divest itself of its colonial empire and pressed ahead with reforms. The Fijian people as a whole were enfranchised for the first time in 1963, when the legislature was made a wholly elective body, except for 2 members out of 36 nominated by the Great Council of Chiefs. 1964 saw the first step towards responsible government, with the introduction of the Member system. Specific portfolios were given to certain elected members of the Legislative Council. They did not constitute a Cabinet in the Westminster sense of the term, as they were officially advisers to the colonial Governor rather than ministers with executive authority, and were responsible only to the Governor, not to the legislature. Nevertheless, over the ensuing three years, the then Governor, Sir Derek Jakeway, treated the Members more and more like ministers, to prepare them for the advent of responsible government.

A constitutional conference was held in London in July 1965, to discuss constitutional changes with a view to introducing responsible government. Indo-Fijians, led by A. D. Patel, demanded the immediate introduction of full self-government, with a fully elected legislature, to be elected by universal suffrage on a common voters' roll. These demands were vigorously rejected by the ethnic Fijian delegation, who still feared loss of control over natively owned land and resources should an Indo-Fijian dominated government come to power. The British made it clear, however, that they were determined to bring Fiji to self-government and eventual independence. Realising that they had no choice, Fiji's chiefs decided to negotiate for the best deal they could get.

A series of compromises led to the establishment of a cabinet system of government in 1967, with Ratu Kamisese Mara as the first Chief Minister. Ongoing negotiations between Mara and Sidiq Koya, who had taken over the leadership of the mainly Indo-Fijian National Federation Party on Patel's death in 1969, led to a second constitutional conference in London, in April 1970, at which Fiji's Legislative Council agreed on a compromise electoral formula and a timetable for independence as a fully sovereign and independent nation within the Commonwealth. The Legislative Council would be replaced with a bicameral Parliament, with a Senate dominated by Fijian chiefs and a popularly elected House of Representatives. In the 52-member House, Native Fijians and Indo-Fijians would each be allocated 22 seats, of which 12 would represent Communal constituencies comprising voters registered on strictly ethnic roles, and another 10 representing National constituencies to which members were allocated by ethnicity but elected by universal suffrage. A further 8 seats were reserved for "General electors" – Europeans, Chinese, Banaban Islanders, and other minorities; 3 of these were "communal" and 5 "national".

With this compromise, Fiji became independent on 10 October 1970.

=== Coups ===
Following the election of the ethnically Indian-dominated government of Prime Minister Timoci Bavadra (although he personally was an indigenous Fijian) on 13 April 1987, Lieutenant Colonel Sitiveni Rabuka carried out the first of two military coups on 14 May 1987. At first, Rabuka expressed loyalty to Queen Elizabeth II. However, Governor-General Ratu Sir Penaia Ganilau, in an effort to uphold Fiji's constitution, refused to swear in the new (self-appointed) government headed by Rabuka, and so Rabuka declared a republic on 6 October 1987. This was accepted by the British government on 15 October 1987, and Ganilau resigned on the same day. In a letter addressed to Queen Elizabeth II, Ganilau wrote:

"With humble duty, I wish to submit to you the following advice, acting in my capacity as your representative in Fiji. Owing to the uncertainty of the political and constitutional situation in Fiji, I have now made up my mind to request Your Majesty to relieve me of my appointment as Governor-General with immediate effect. This I do with utmost regret, but my endeavours to preserve constitutional government in Fiji have proved in vain, and I can see no alternative way forward. With deepest respect, Penaia Ganilau, Governor-General."

Following the establishment of the Republic of Fiji, former Governor-General Ratu Sir Penaia Ganilau became the first President of Fiji, in December 1987.

Fiji was then declared to have been expelled from the Commonwealth - but this was reversed in 1997 when a new Constitution was enacted.

== Politics ==
The following Governors-General held office:

1. Sir Robert Sidney Foster 10 October 1970 – 13 February 1973
2. Ratu Sir George Cakobau 13 February 1973 – 12 February 1983
3. Ratu Sir Penaia Ganilau 12 February 1983 – 6/15 October 1987

The following held office as prime minister (and head of government):

1. Ratu Sir Kamisese Mara 10 October 1970 – 13 April 1987
2. Timoci Bavadra 13 April 1987 – 14 May 1987 - overthrown

Elizabeth II visited Fiji before its independence in 1953, 1963 and March 1970, and after independence in 1973, 1977 and 1982.
