= Epenisa Cakobau =

Fijian chief

Ratu Epenisa Cakobau Vunivalu of Bau
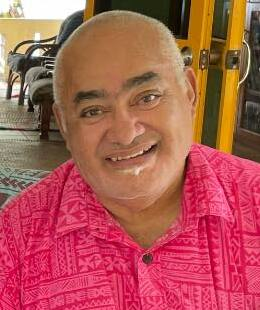

Member of the Fijian Parliament for Tailevu South Lomaiviti
- In office 15 May 1999 – 1 September 2001
- Preceded by: None (constituency established)
- Succeeded by: Asenaca Caucau

Personal details
- Born: 1959 or 1960 (age 65–66)
- Party: Soqosoqo ni Vakavulewa ni Taukei; Conservative Alliance-Matanitu Vanua; Social Democratic Liberal Party

Ratu Epenisa Seru Cakobau (pronounced [ðakomˈbau]) (born ~1959 or 1960) is a Fijian chief and politician. Cakobau is a senior member of the Tui Kaba clan. He is the 13th Vunivalu of Bau.

== Biography ==
He is the son of former Governor-General of Fiji and Vunivalu Ratu Sir George Cakobau, and a great-great grandson of Ratu Seru Epenisa Cakobau, the warlord who established the first unified Fiji and became its king in 1871.

Cakobau has been involved in politics; he was elected to the House of Representatives of Fiji in the 1999 Fijian general election as a candidate of the Soqosoqo ni Vakavulewa ni Taukei (SVT), representing the open constituency of Tailevu South Lomaiviti. When the Conservative Alliance, a nationalistic political party was founded in 2001, Cakobau was chosen as its first president. In 2007 when the military regime suspended the Great Council of Chiefs in the aftermath of the 2006 Fijian coup d'état, Cakobau was part of a legal challenge to the suspension. He later opposed the military regime's People's Charter for Change, Peace and Progress.

In 2018, he was arrested to prevent a ceremony to install him as the Vunivalu of Bau. In July 2019 he revealed that he had relocated his family overseas after receiving death threats over the title.

In July 2020, he was elected president of the Social Democratic Liberal Party. He remained with SODELPA when Sitiveni Rabuka split from the party. His term as president expired in 2022, and he was replaced by Manoa Roragaca.

In March 2023, he was installed as Vunivalu of Bau.

== Personal life ==
He married Adi Frances Loloma in September 1986.
