= Government House, Suva =

Fiji

State House
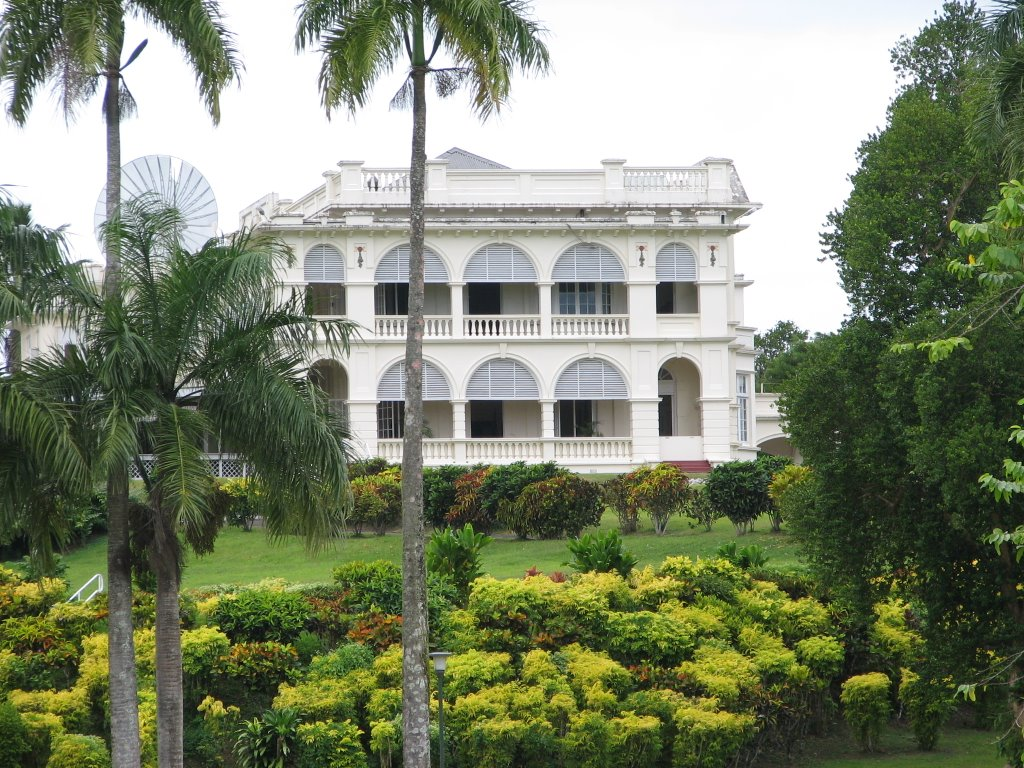
- The State House, viewed from Queen Elizabeth Drive
- Former names: Government House
- Alternative names: Presidential Palace

General information
- Type: Official residence
- Architectural style: Georgian
- Location: Queen Elizabeth Drive, Suva, Fiji
- Coordinates: 18.151892°S 178.426140°E
- Current tenants: Wiliame Katonivere, President of Fiji
- Completed: 1928
- Client: Colony of Fiji
- Owner: Government of Fiji

The State House (formerly known as the Government House) is the official residence of the president of Fiji. It was built in 1928 to replace the original which burned down after a lightning strike. It was originally used by the British Governor of Fiji and later the Governor-General of Fiji following independence. It became the official residence of the President in 1987.

== History ==
The present Georgian mansion was built in 1928 to replace the original building - the residence of the British Governor - which burnt to the ground after being struck by lightning in 1921. The first Government House was built in the early 1880s (after the capital moved in Suva) that consisted of two small wood-frame buildings.

From 1970 to 1987, Government House was the official residence of the Governor-General of Fiji, and became the presidential residence in 1987 after two military coups resulted in the proclamation of a republic. Government House is the traditional location for the swearing in of the government of Fiji. During the May coup, the Governor-General Sir Penaia Ganilau refused to swear in Sitiveni Rabuka's military government at Government House. In the later coup, Rabuka declared Fiji a republic but said he would not attempt to remove the Governor-General from Government House for traditional reasons. Ganilau later resigned as Governor-General and took up the role at Government House as Fiji's first President. In 2016, it was renamed as State House.

== Location ==
The residence is located south of Fiji Museum, with the main entrance on Queen Elizabeth Drive, near the Great Council of Chiefs complex. The building is closed to the public, but a highlight of tourist visits to Suva is the changing of the guard ceremony during the first week of each month. The guards are staffed by members of the Republic of Fiji Military Forces.

The building should not be confused with the Government Buildings to the north on the same street (Victoria Parade).

== Gallery ==
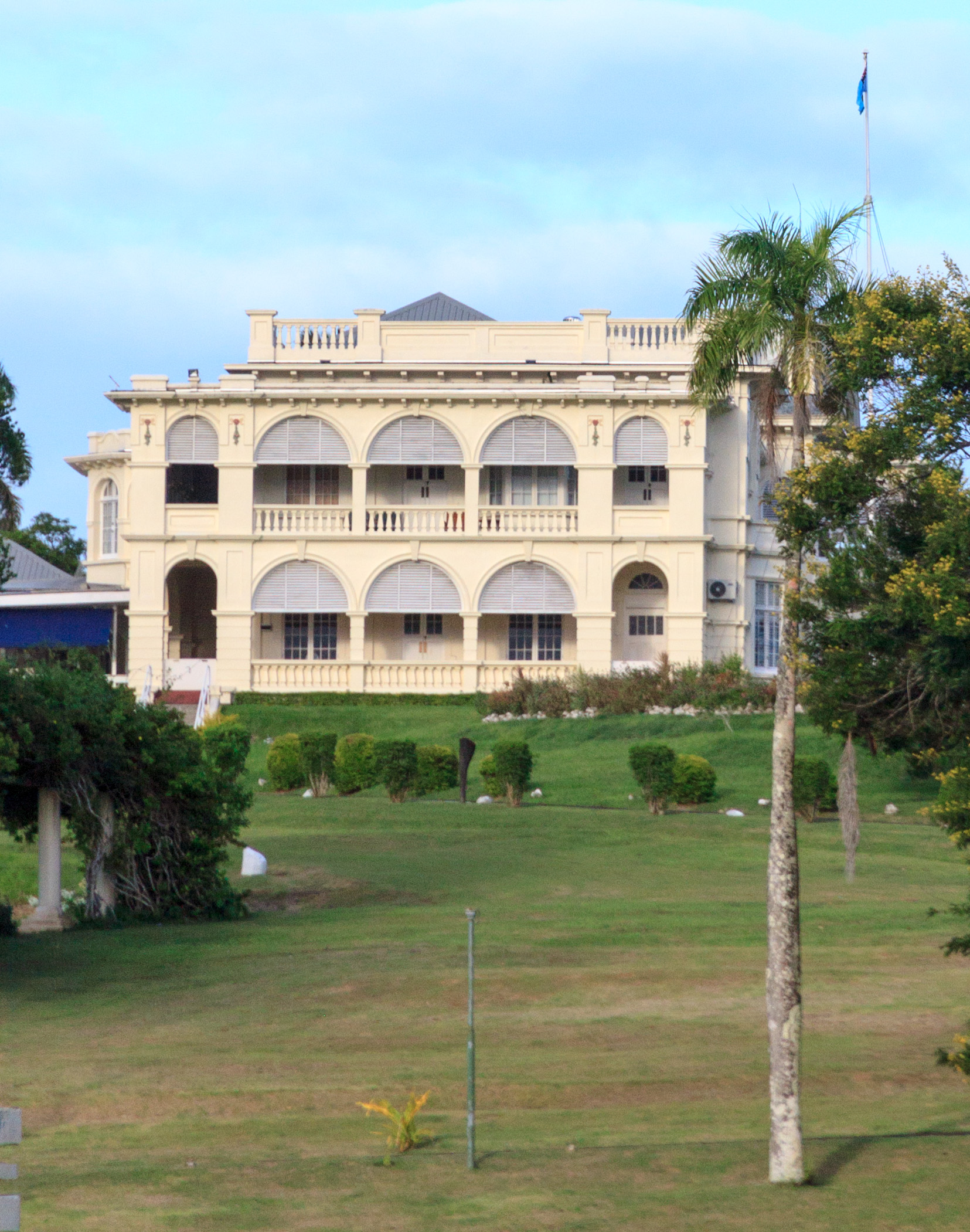
West elevation, 2015

== See also ==
- Government Houses of the British Empire
