= Penaia Ganilau =

President of Fiji from 1987 to 1993

Na Tui Cakau Cegu His Excellency The Honourable Ratu Sir Penaia Ganilau GCMG KCVO KBE DSO ED
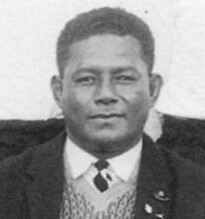
- Ganilau in 1950

President of Fiji
- In office 8 December 1987 – 15 December 1993
- Prime Minister: Ratu Sir Kamisese Mara
- Preceded by: Office Established
- Succeeded by: Ratu Sir Kamisese Mara

3rd Governor-General of Fiji
- In office 12 February 1983 – 15 October 1987
- Monarch: Elizabeth II
- Prime Minister: Ratu Sir Kamisese Mara
- Preceded by: Ratu Sir George Cakobau
- Succeeded by: Office abolished.

Deputy Prime Minister of Fiji
- In office 1973–1983
- Prime Minister: Ratu Sir Kamisese Mara
- Preceded by: Ratu Sir Edward Cakobau

Senator of Fiji
- In office 1970–1973
- Appointed by: Governor-General of Fiji on the advice of the Prime Minister
- Monarch: Elizabeth ll
- Prime Minister: Ratu Sir Kamisese Mara

Member of the Legislative Council of Fiji
- In office 1959-1966
- Monarch: Elizabeth ll
- Governor: Sir Kenneth Maddocks (1959-1964( Sir Derek Jakeway (Till End Of Term)

Personal details
- Born: 28 July 1918 Taveuni, Fiji
- Died: 15 December 1993 (aged 75) Washington, D.C., U.S.
- Resting place: Taveuni, Fiji
- Spouses: Laisa Delaisomosomo (1949); Asilina Davila (1974); Bale Mavoa (1986)
- Children: 7; including Ratu Epeli
- Occupation: Soldier, scholar
- Portfolio: Minister for Fijian Affairs and Rural Development; Minister for Home Affairs; Minister for Communications, Works and Tourism; Minister for Home Affairs, Lands and Mineral Resources (Colonial); Minister for Fijian Affairs and Local Government (Colonial)

Ratu Sir Penaia Kanatabatu Ganilau GCMG KCVO KBE DSO ED (28 July 1918 – 15 December 1993) was a Fijian politician who served as the first President of Fiji, serving from 8 December 1987 until his death in 1993. He had previously served as Governor-General of Fiji, representing Elizabeth II, Queen of Fiji, from 12 February 1983 to 15 October 1987.

== Education and early career ==
Ganilau was educated at the Northern Provincial School [now known as Bucalevu Secondary School] and the Queen Victoria School. In 1939 he was a member of the Fiji rugby team that toured New Zealand, earning a cap in a 14–4 win over New Zealand Maori on 16 September. During World War II he served as a company commander. He subsequently graduated from the Devonshire Course for administration officers at Wadham College, Oxford University in 1946.

Returning to Fiji, he joined the Colonial Administration Service the following year and served as a District Officer from 1948 to 1953. The following three years were spent in the Royal Fiji Military Forces. He fought in the Malayan Emergency, earning a Distinguished Service Order. He retired in 1956 with the rank of lieutenant colonel. He then became the Roko Tui Cakaudrove, his first administrative position. He became a nominated member of the Legislative Council in 1959 and subsequently returned to the civil service and became Deputy Secretary for Fijian Affairs in 1961.

== Political career ==
In 1963, in the first elections in which ethnic Fijians voted directly, Ganilau was elected to the Legislative Council. He did not stand in the 1966 elections, but when responsible government was instituted in 1967, he was appointed Minister for Fijian Affairs and Local Government, serving until 1970. He subsequently served as Minister for Home Affairs, Lands and Mineral Resources from 1970 to 1972, when he became Minister for Communications, Works and Tourism. In 1973, he was appointed Deputy Prime Minister, a position he was to hold for the next decade; during this time, he also served as Minister for Home Affairs (1975–1983) and as Minister for Fijian Affairs and Rural Development (1977–1983). In 1983 he became Governor-General.

== Last Governor-General, first President ==
Ratu Sir Penaia Ganilau was to be Fiji's last Governor-General. Two military coups were carried out in 1987 by Lieutenant Colonel Sitiveni Rabuka. After the first coup on 14 May, Ganilau defiantly refused to give up the office of Governor-General. Attempting to uphold the constitution, he tried to return Fiji to parliamentary democracy, but a second coup forced him to resign as Governor-General on 15 October 1987, with the ending of Fiji's monarchy.

In his letter of resignation, addressed to Queen Elizabeth II, Ganilau wrote:

"With humble duty, I wish to submit to you the following advice, acting in my capacity as your representative in Fiji. Owing to the uncertainty of the political and constitutional situation in Fiji, I have now made up my mind to request Your Majesty to relieve me of my appointment as Governor-General with immediate effect. This I do with utmost regret, but my endeavours to preserve constitutional government in Fiji have proved in vain, and I can see no alternative way forward. With the deepest respect, Penaia Ganilau, Governor-General."

On 8 December 1987, Ratu Ganilau was appointed the first president of the new Republic of Fiji. He saw to the appointment of the interim civilian government that was to lead Fiji for a five-year transitional period of constitutional change. During this time, he presided over the promulgation of the Fijian constitution of 1990. The first general elections since the crisis of 1987 were held in 1992. He remained President and head of state until his death in 1993, though ill-health had forced him to hand over most of his day-to-day functions to the vice-president, Ratu Sir Kamisese Mara, in 1992. He remained the official President until he died.

== Honours ==
Ratu Sir Penaia Ganilau was awarded many honours throughout his lifetime. These included the DSO (1956), OBE (1960), Companion of the CMG (1968, CVO (1970), KBE (1974), KCVO (1982), and GCMG (1983). He also received an honorary doctorate in education in 1974.

== Personal details ==
A scion of the chiefly Ai Sokula clan, Ganilau was installed in 1988 as the fourteenth Tui Cakau, the traditional ruler of Cakaudrove Province. As such, he was recognised as the paramount chief of the Tovata Confederacy, covering much of northern and eastern Fiji, making him one of the three highest-ranking chiefs in the Fijian peerage.

Ganilau was married three times and had two daughters and six sons, of whom one, Ratu Epeli Ganilau, followed in his footsteps by pursuing a political career of his own. As a statesman, Ganilau was regarded as a moderate conservative, upholding the traditions of the chiefly system but embracing modern political institutions. He died at the age of 75 on 15 December 1993 in Washington, D.C., where he was receiving medical treatment.

== Bibliography ==
- Daryl Tarte (1993). Turaga. The Life and Times and Chiefly Authority of Ratu Sir Penaia Ganilau, G.C.M.G., K.C.V.O., K.B.E., D.S.O., K.St.J., E.D. in Fiji. Suva, Fiji: Fiji Times.
