= Government Buildings, Suva =

Government Buildings
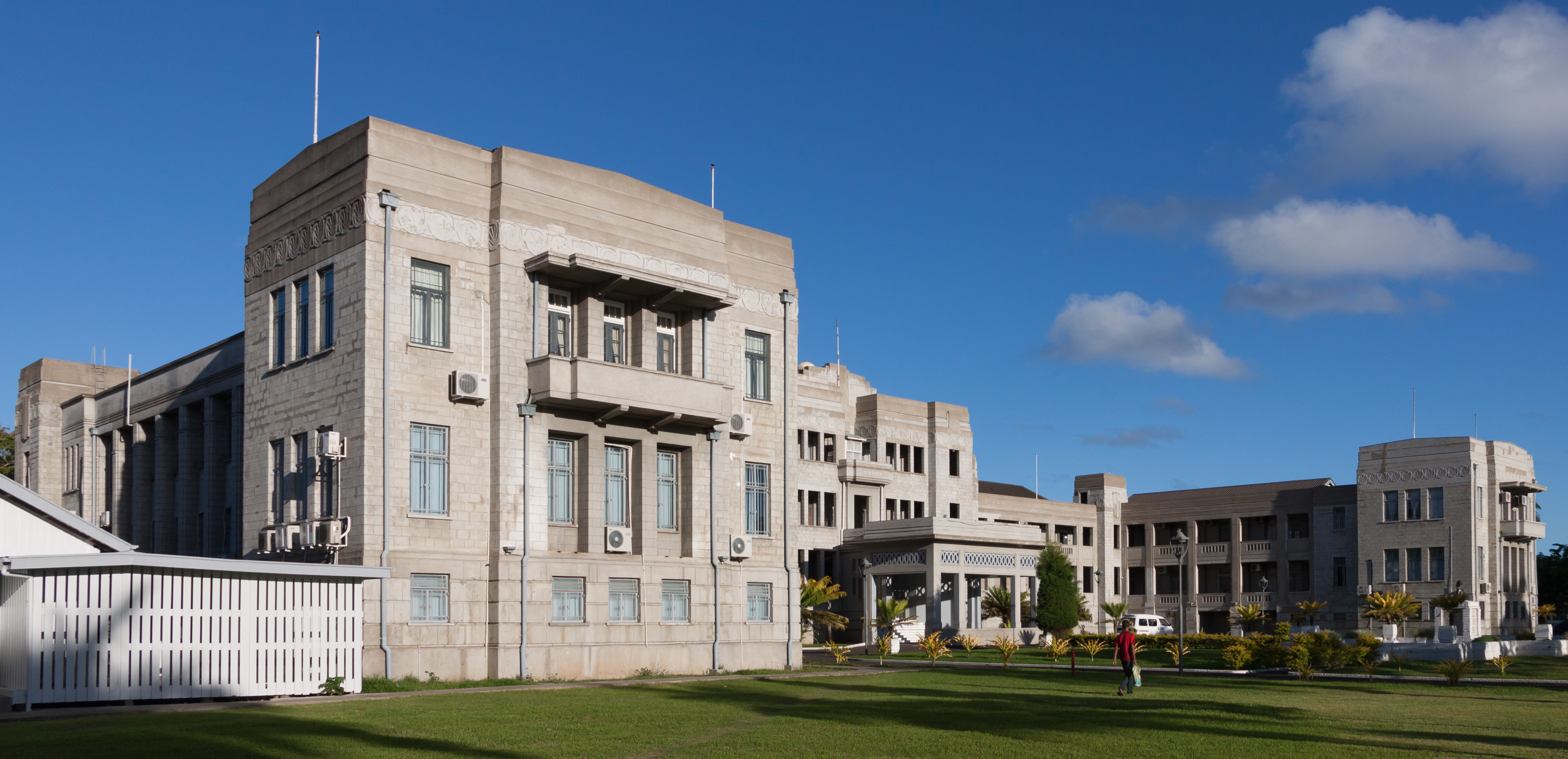
- Victoria Parade facade of the Government Buildings.
- Interactive map of the Government Buildings area

General information
- Type: Government offices
- Architectural style: Inter-War Stripped Classical
- Location: Victoria Parade, Suva, Fiji
- Coordinates: 18.145858°S 178.424413°E
- Construction started: 1937
- Completed: 1939; 87 years ago
- Client: Colony of Fiji
- Owner: Government of Fiji (current)

Design and construction
- Architects: W. F. Hedges; OBE FRIBA

The Government Buildings in Suva are the offices of the executive wing of Government of Fiji. Built in the late 1930s as the seat of the colonial administration, the Art Deco buildings today house the Prime Minister of Fiji's offices, the High Court, and several government ministries. It is also the seat of the Parliament of Fiji since 2014, having previously been the seat of Fiji's parliament from independence in 1970 until the 1987 coups.

== History ==
With the foundation stone laid in 1937, the Government Buildings were designed by the Chief Colonial Architect, Walter Frederick Hedges, who had served from 1928 to 1931 as chief architect in the Federated Malay States, where he designed the Kuala Lumpur Hospital and Istana Iskandariah, the palace of the Sultan of Perak. Hedges had previously served as Chief Architect in the Public Works Department in the Gold Coast Colony, where he designed the Prince of Wales College, Achimota, and was made an Officer of the Order of the British Empire (OBE).

The Government Buildings were formally opened in May 1939 by Governor Sir Harry Luke. From the time of its opening, the buildings were the seat of the colonial administration and the Legislative Council of Fiji. With independence in 1970, the Legislative Council became the Parliament of Fiji and remained its seat until the 1987 coups. Parliament then moved to temporary premises until the opening of a new Parliament complex in 1992. Parliament was suspended following the 2006 coup d'état and when it returned following the 2014 general election, Parliament returned to its historic seat within the Government Buildings.

In 2013, Chief Justice Anthony Gates commissioned various renovations for the Courts section of the Government Buildings, which includes restoration of the clock tower on Gladstone Road. The clock was built and assembled by the Cumbria Clock Company in 1939.

== Location ==
The building is located across the street from Albert Park, bounded by Southern Cross Road, Gladestone Road, Thurston Street and Victoria Parade.

There are two statues located in the front of the building:

- Ratu Epenisa Seru Cakobau
- Ratu Sir Lala Sukuna

The buildings should not be confused with Government House to the south on the same street (Victoria Parade).

== Gallery ==
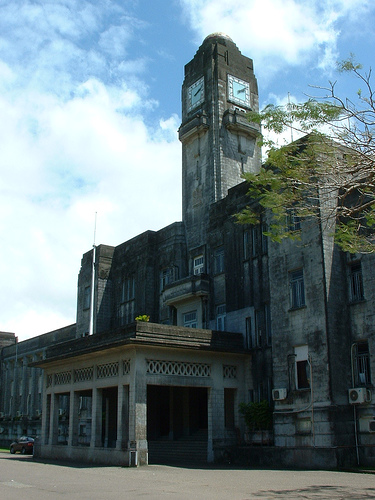
Clock Tower, March 2010

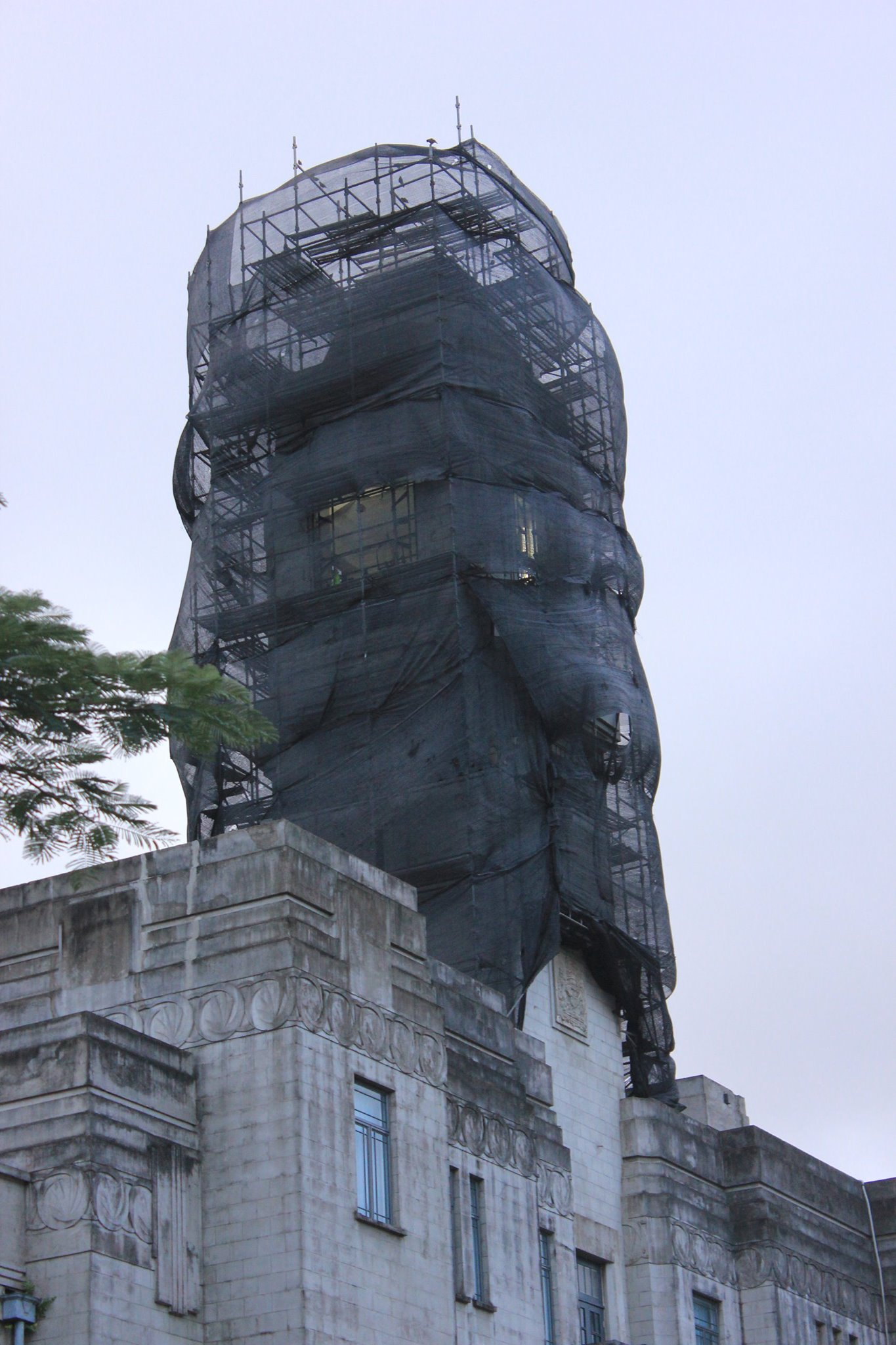
Clock Tower wrapped in scaffolding for restoration, July 2014

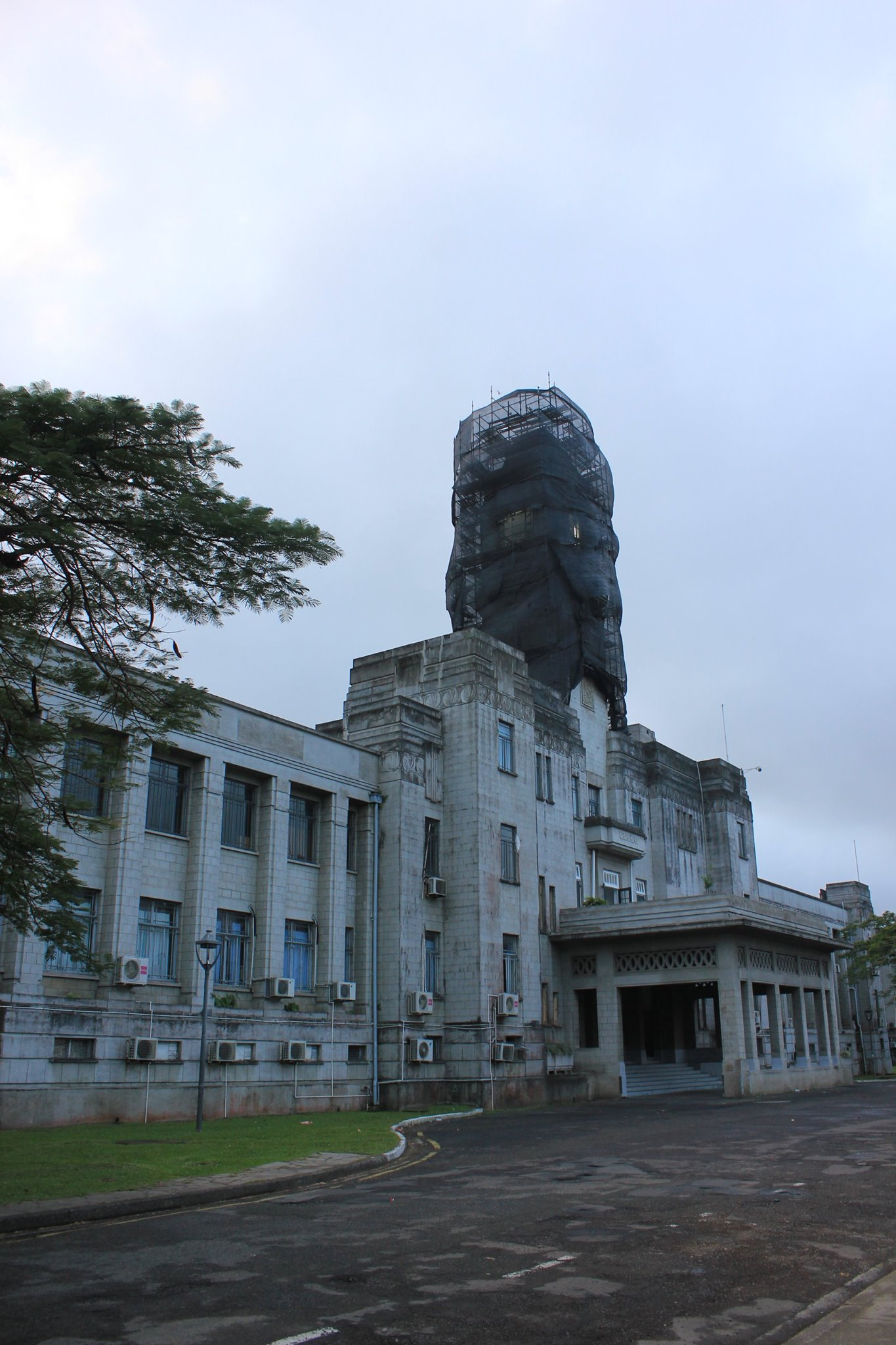
July 2014

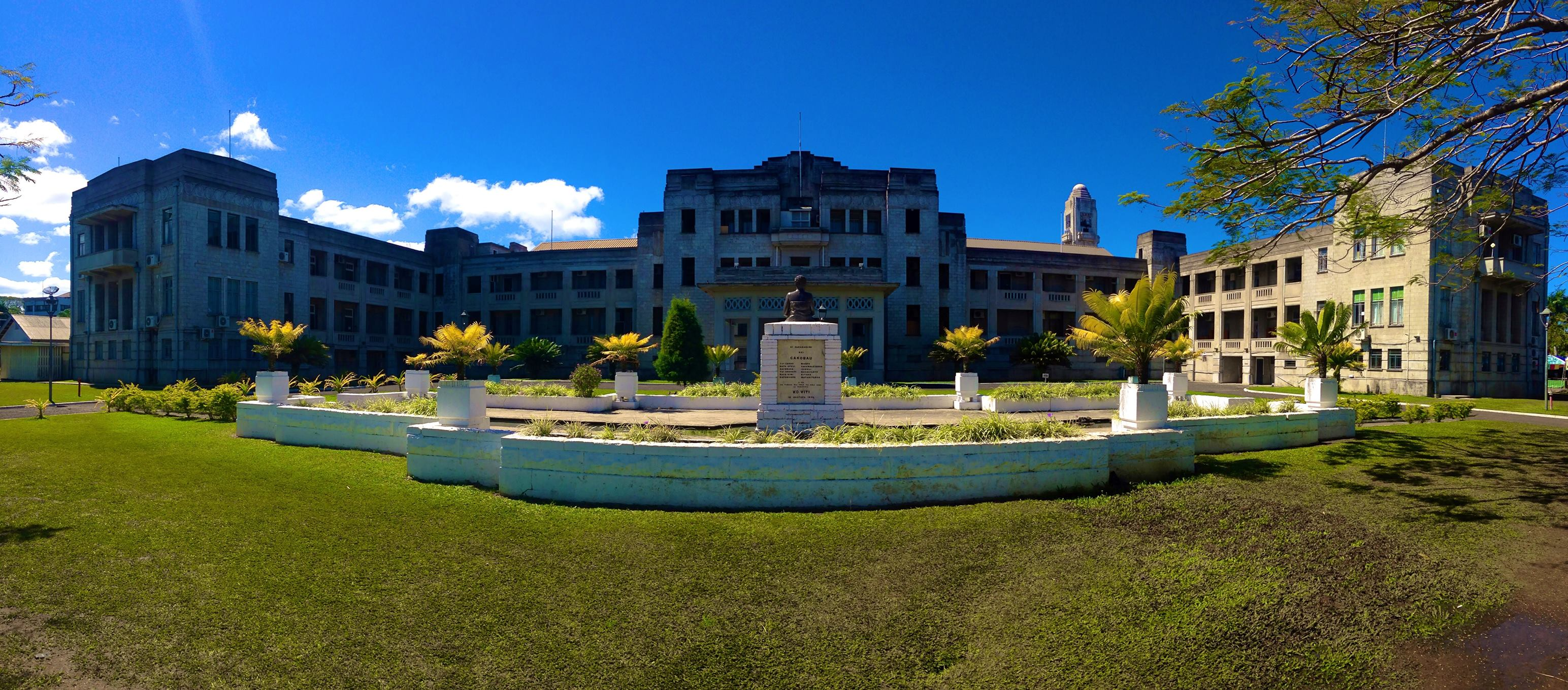
August 2014

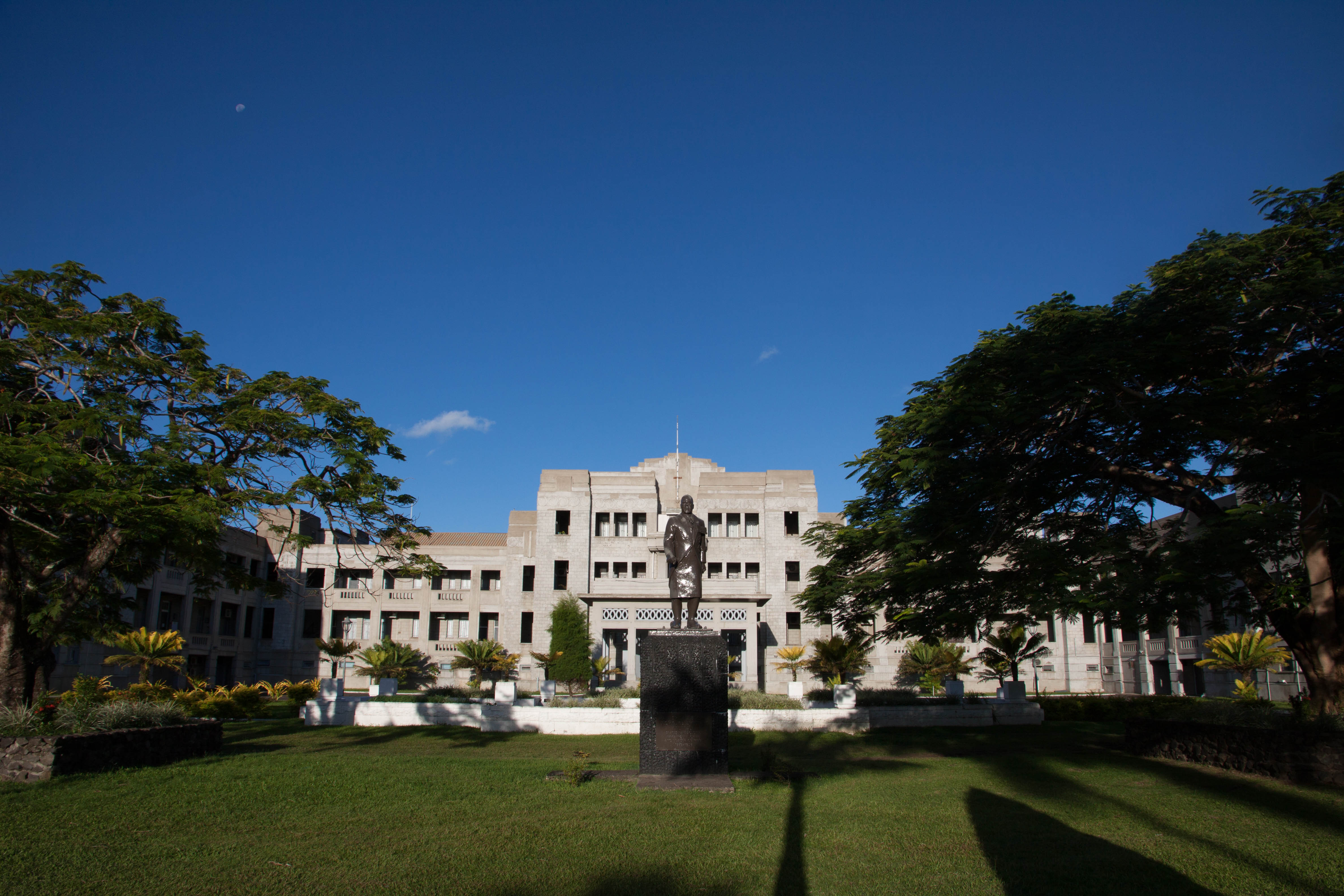
2015
