= Tailevu South Lomaiviti (Open Constituency, Fiji) =

Former electoral constituency in Fiji

Tailevu South Lomaiviti Open is a former electoral division of Fiji, one of 25 open constituencies that were elected by universal suffrage (the remaining 46 seats, called communal constituencies, were allocated by ethnicity). Established by the 1997 Constitution, it came into being in 1999 and was used for the parliamentary elections of 1999, 2001, and 2006. It comprised the Lomaiviti Archipelago (except Ovalau) and the southern part of Tailevu Province, on the main island of Viti Levu.

The 2013 Constitution promulgated by the Military-backed interim government abolished all constituencies and established a form of proportional representation, with the entire country voting as a single electorate.

== Election results ==
In the following tables, the primary vote refers to first-preference votes cast. The final vote refers to the final tally after votes for low-polling candidates have been progressively redistributed to other candidates according to pre-arranged electoral agreements (see electoral fusion), which may be customized by the voters (see instant run-off voting).

=== 1999 ===
Candidate	Political party	Votes (primary)	%	Votes (final)	%
Isireli Mokunitulevu Vuibau	Fiji Labour Party (FLP)	3,351	21.39	8,759	55.92
Ratu Epenisa Seru Cakobau	Soqosoqo ni Vakavulewa ni Taukei (SVT)	6,161	39.33	6,905	44.08
Samuela Matawalu	Fijian Association Party (FAP)	3,926	25.06	...	...
Josua Tubanavere Uluiviti	Christian Democratic Alliance (VLV)	1,567	10.00	...	...
Joji Bakoso	Nationalist Vanua Tako Lavo Party (NVTLP)	594	3.79	...	...
Isris Ali	Independent	43	0.27	...	...
Ram Krishna Reddy	National Federation Party	22	0.14	...	...
Total		15,664	100.00	15,664	100.00

=== 2001 ===
Candidate	Political party	Votes (primary)	%	Votes (final)	%
Adi Asenaca Caucau	Soqosoqo Duavata ni Lewenivanua (SDL)	6,283	40.94	10,523	68.58
Poseci Voceduadua	Fiji Labour Party (FLP)	3,344	21.79	4,823	31.42
Rusiate Korovusere	Conservative Alliance (CAMV)	2,173	14.16	...	...
Isireli Mokunitulevu Vuibau	New Labour Unity Party (NLUP)	1,367	8.91	...	...
Josua Tubunavere Uluiviti	Soqosoqo ni Vakavulewa ni Taukei (SVT)	801	5.22	...	...
Adi Finau Tamari Tabakaucoro	Independent	602	3.92	...	...
Anitelu Mateisuva	Nationalist Vanua Tako Lavo Party (NVTLP)	389	2.53	...	...
Inoke Seru	Fijian Association Party (FAP)	389	2.53	...	...
Total		15,348	100.00	15,348	100.00

=== 2006 ===
Candidate	Political party	Votes	%
Adi Asenaca Caucau	Soqosoqo Duavata ni Lewenivanua (SDL)	10,400	61.43
Aisea Naikawakawa	Fiji Labour Party (FLP)	5,736	33.88
Wailevu Jone Tovehi	Independent	793	4.68
Total		16,929	100.00

== Sources ==
- Psephos - Adam Carr's electoral archive
- Fiji Facts
