= Robert Sidney Foster =

British colonial governor (1913–2005)

Sir Robert Sidney Foster GCMG KCVO

1st Governor-General of Fiji
- In office 10 October 1970 – 13 January 1973
- Monarch: Elizabeth II
- Prime Minister: Ratu Sir Kamisese Mara
- Preceded by: Himself as Governor of Fiji
- Succeeded by: Ratu Sir George Cakobau

22nd Governor of Fiji
- In office December 1968 – 10 October 1970
- Monarch: Elizabeth II
- Chief Minister: Ratu Sir Kamisese Mara
- Preceded by: Sir Derek Jakeway
- Succeeded by: Himself as Governor-General of Fiji

4th Governor of the Solomon Islands
- In office 16 June 1964 – 6 March 1969
- Monarch: Elizabeth II
- Preceded by: David Trench
- Succeeded by: Donald Luddington

20th High Commissioner for the Western Pacific
- In office 16 June 1964 – 6 March 1969
- Monarch: Elizabeth II
- Preceded by: David Trench
- Succeeded by: Donald Luddington

Personal details
- Born: 11 August 1913
- Died: 12 October 2005 (aged 92) Cambridge, United Kingdom
- Citizenship: British
- Spouse(s): Madge Walker; 1947–1991 (her death)

Sir Robert Sidney Foster GCMG KCVO (11 August 1913 – 12 October 2005) was a British colonial administrator, best remembered as the last colonial Governor of Fiji and the first Governor-General of the Dominion of Fiji. He had previously served as Governor of the Solomon Islands and as High Commissioner for the Western Pacific (positions that briefly overlapped with his tenure as Governor of Fiji).

== Colonial service ==
Foster entered the administrative service in 1936 in Northern Rhodesia. He remained there, and in Nyasaland (now Malawi) until 1964, serving first as a cadet until 1938, and then as a District Officer until 1940. From 1957 to 1960, he was a Major Provincial Commissioner, before serving as Secretary to the Ministry of Native Affairs from 1960 to 1961, when he became Chief Secretary of Nyasaland, a position he held until 1963. He was Deputy Governor of Nyasaland from 1963 to 1964.

In 1964, he left Africa for the Pacific Islands to become High Commissioner of the Western Pacific. In this capacity, he had overall responsibility for the British colonies and protectorates in the region, namely the Solomon Islands, the Gilbert and Ellice Islands (now Kiribati and Tuvalu), and over the British participation in the Anglo-French Condominium of the New Hebrides (now Vanuatu). He remained High Commissioner until December 1968, when he became Governor of Fiji. When Fiji became independent on 10 October 1970 he assumed the new position of Governor-General. His role was little changed, except that he now acted on the advice of the Fijian Cabinet rather than the British government. He retired on 13 January 1973, ending a 37-year career in the colonial service. He was succeeded as Governor-General by Ratu Sir George Cakobau, a patrilineal descendant of King Seru Epenisa Cakobau, who had ceded Fiji to the United Kingdom in 1874.

== Personal life and honours ==
Foster married Madge Walker in 1947. She died in 1991.

A number of honours were awarded to Foster during his lifetime. He received the CMG in 1961, the KCMG in 1964, and the GCMG in 1970.

Foster died in Cambridge, England on 12 October 2005, aged 92.

== Family Connections ==
Government offices
Preceded by David Clive Crosbie Trench	High Commissioner for the Western Pacific; 1964–1968	Succeeded by Michael David Irving Gass
Preceded by David Clive Crosbie Trench	Governor of the Solomon Islands; 1964–1968	Succeeded by Michael David Irving Gass
Preceded by Sir Francis Derek Jakeway	Governor of Fiji; 1968–1970	Post abolished
New creation	Governor-General of Fiji; 1970–1973	Succeeded by Ratu Sir George Cakobau
