= Kenneth Maddocks =

British colonial official

Sir Kenneth Phipson Maddocks GCMG KCVO
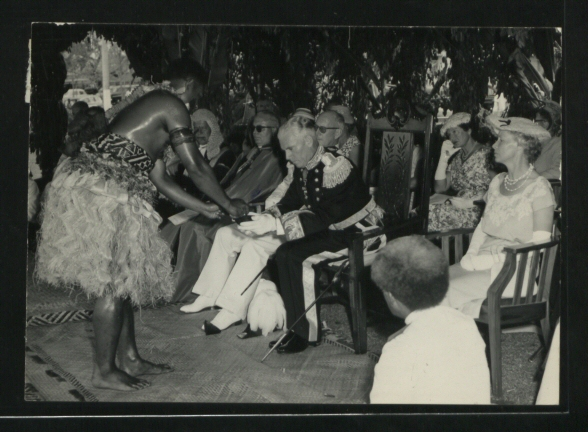
- Sir Kenneth Maddocks receiving the customary bilo of yagona during the traditional Fijian welcome extended to him in Suva.

20th Governor of Fiji
- In office 28 October 1958 – 6 January 1964
- Monarch: Elizabeth II
- Preceded by: Sir Ronald Garvey
- Succeeded by: Sir Derek Jakeway

Personal details
- Born: 8 February 1907 Haywards Heath, Sussex
- Died: 28 August 2001 (aged 94) Aldeburgh, Suffolk
- Citizenship: British
- Spouse(s): Elnor Russell; 1951-1976 (her death); Patricia Mooring m. 1980
- Education: Wadham College, Oxford

Sir Kenneth Maddocks, GCMG KCVO (8 February 1907 – 28 August 2001) was a British colonial official who served as Governor and Commander-in-Chief of Fiji from 1958 until 1963.

== Life and career ==
Kenneth Phipson Maddocks was the son of a civil engineer from Coventry. He had relatives in government service scattered across India, Egypt, Canada, and Australia. His mother died of influenza in 1918. He was educated at Bromsgrove School and at Wadham College, Oxford, where he read Physics and rowed for his college.

He joined the Colonial Administrative Service in 1929 and was sent to northern Nigeria, for which he had expressed a preference, following in the footsteps of a brother who had joined the new Tanganyika Territory Service.

After barely a year in Kano Province, a district whose administration exemplified the British policy of indirect rule, he suddenly found himself posted to the "punishment" province of Benue - for seven years. There he became one of the few district officers to learn Tiv. But he never served in the Tiv language region again.

His next posting was to the relative comforts of Jos and the Plateau. Retained in the Nigerian service throughout World War II - against his wishes and despite the success of many of his colleagues in joining the Royal West African Frontier Force - he spent four years in the Lagos Secretariat.

In 1948 his experience and ability were such that the government in Kaduna asked him to collaborate on a report into the Native Administration structure in the Northern Provinces. This was intended to show how demand for local government, from both the new-look Colonial Office - now self-consciously rooted in democratic principles - and the younger ranks of Northern legislators, could best be implemented in the heartland of British indirect rule.

In 1951 he married Elnor, the daughter of Sir John Russell, Fellow of the Royal Society.

After a spell in the senior Residencies of first Kano and then Sokoto, Maddocks was promoted Civil Secretary in 1955. He became Deputy Governor in 1957, with spells in between as Officer Administering the Government of Northern Nigeria.

In 1958 he left to become Governor of Fiji. His governorship was marked by industrial disputes which led him to invoke his emergency powers and call in the military in support of the civil power. His health gave way, both in Suva and, en route home, in Venice.

He was awarded the title of Companion of St Michael and St George in 1956 and advanced to Knight Commander of St Michael and St George in 1958. He was made Knight Commander of the Royal Victorian Order in 1963 at the time of the Queen's visit to the Pacific.

On leaving the Colonial Service in 1963, he spent five years as Director and Secretary of the East Africa and Mauritius Association, which provided a means of communication between the business world and the newly independent governments of East Africa.

His first wife Elnor died in 1976 and in 1980 he married Patricia, the widow of Sir George Mooring, formerly of the Nigerian Administrative Service and the last Resident of Zanzibar, 1960–1963. Maddocks had no children of his own, but had a large extended family who called him Uncle or Grandpa. He was an enthusiastic gardener, a hobby he continued on his return to Britain, where he lived first in Somerset and then in Suffolk.

In his second retirement, he produced two memoirs, both privately published. Bush Life in Nigeria (1978) was an account of the up-country experiences of Elnor when she was married to a district officer in the Nigerian Service before the war. Based on her letters home, the book was a vignette of outstation life in a seemingly time-warped rural northern Nigeria. Ten years later, encouraged by this success, he was persuaded to compile a straightforward narrative of his 35 years in the colonial service, Of No Fixed Abode.

Preceded by Sir Philip Euen Mitchell	Governor of Fiji; 1958–1964	Succeeded by Sir Francis Derek Jakeway
