= Finau Tabakaucoro =

Fijian politician

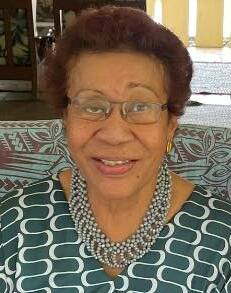
Adi Finau Tabakaucoro (2023)

Adi Finau Tamari Tabakaucoro is a former Fijian civil servant and Cabinet Minister, who served as a Minister in the interim Cabinet appointed by Sitiveni Rabuka following the 1987 Fijian coups d'état, and as an assistant Minister in the interim Cabinet appointed by Laisenia Qarase in the wake of the 2000 Fijian coup d'état. She is currently president of the Soqosoqo Vakamarama I Taukei, Fiji's largest indigenous women's organisation.

== Early life ==
Tabakaucoro was born in Savusavu, Cakaudrove and raised in the village of Nagigi. She attended Navatu district School in Nasinu, Draiba Fijian School, Adi Cakobau School and Suva Grammar School, and later studied history at the Victoria University of Wellington from 1964-1967. To supplement her government scholarship she had several part-time jobs. She worked as a babysitter and a waitress. She was also employed in a candle shop and in a factory sewing headscarfs and pillowcases. After graduating, she undertook teacher training at Epsom Secondary Teachers College before training as a civil servant at the Royal Institute of Public Administration in the United Kingdom.

On returning to Fiji she worked as a training officer in the department of localisation and training, and then as assistant secretary for the Ministry of Urban Development, Housing and Social Welfare, before joining the United Nations Development Program. In 1980 she became president of the Fiji YWCA.

Tabakaucoro is a member of the Tui Kaba clan, the royal family of Tailevu and of the Kubuna Confederacy. She has been outspoken in her calls for the next Vunivalu of Bau (generally recognized as Fiji's highest chiefly title) to be elected by the whole of the Tui Kaba clan, rather than appointed by a few elders.

== Political career ==
Following the 1987 Fijian coups d'état she was appointed minister for women, culture and social welfare in the interim government from 1987 to 1992. She played a role in the drafting of the 1990 Constitution of Fiji, and advocated successfully for a constitutional ban on sex- and religious-discrimination in Fiji. In 1992 she was appointed to the Senate of Fiji. Following the 2000 Fijian coup d'état she was appointed to the interim government as an assistant minister, holding office till an elected government took power in September 2001. She then stood as an independent candidate in the Tailevu South Lomaiviti Open Constituency in the 2001 election, but was not successful.

In 2005 she supported the Reconciliation, Tolerance, and Unity Bill. Following the 2006 Fijian coup d'état she said that ousted prime minister Laisenia Qarase should have resigned, and urged people not to resist the military takeover. In March 2008 she accepted appointment to the military regime's National Council for Building a Better Fiji, and later defended the military's role in drafting the People's Charter for Change, Peace and Progress.

== Honours ==
In October 2020 Tabakaucoro was awarded the 50th-anniversary independence medal.
