= Royal Victorian Chain =

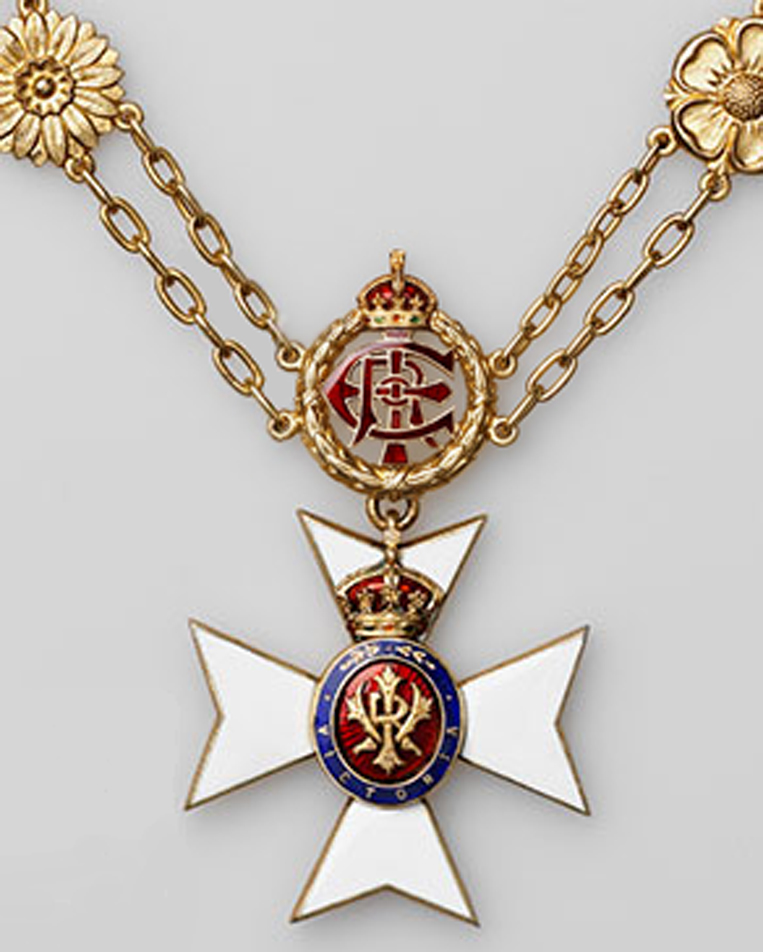
- Type: Decoration
- Awarded for: At the monarch's pleasure
- Presented by: The monarch of the Commonwealth realms
- Eligibility: Men and women, of any nation
- Status: Currently awarded
- Established: 1902
- First award: 1902
- Ribbon bar

The Royal Victorian Chain is a decoration instituted in 1902 by King Edward VII as a personal award of the monarch (i.e. not an award made on the advice of any Commonwealth realm government). It ranks above the Royal Victorian Order, with which it is often associated but not officially related. Originally reserved for members of the royal family, the chain is a distinct award conferred only upon the highest dignitaries, including foreign monarchs, heads of state, and high-ranking individuals such as the Archbishop of Canterbury.

== History ==
The Royal Victorian Chain was created by King Edward VII in 1902, six years after his mother created the Royal Victorian Order. The Royal Victorian Chain ranks above all decorations of the Royal Victorian Order, but it is not officially part of the Order. Edward created it to honour his mother "as a personal decoration for Sovereigns, Princes, and other Royal personages, and also for a few eminent British subjects." It was first recorded as a new decoration in August 1902, when it was reported that Frederick Temple, Archbishop of Canterbury, was received in private audience to receive the Royal Victorian Chain, following the coronation of the King two days earlier. The first recipients included the King's son George, Prince of Wales (later George V) and the King's brother Prince Arthur, Duke of Connaught and Strathearn.

== Design ==
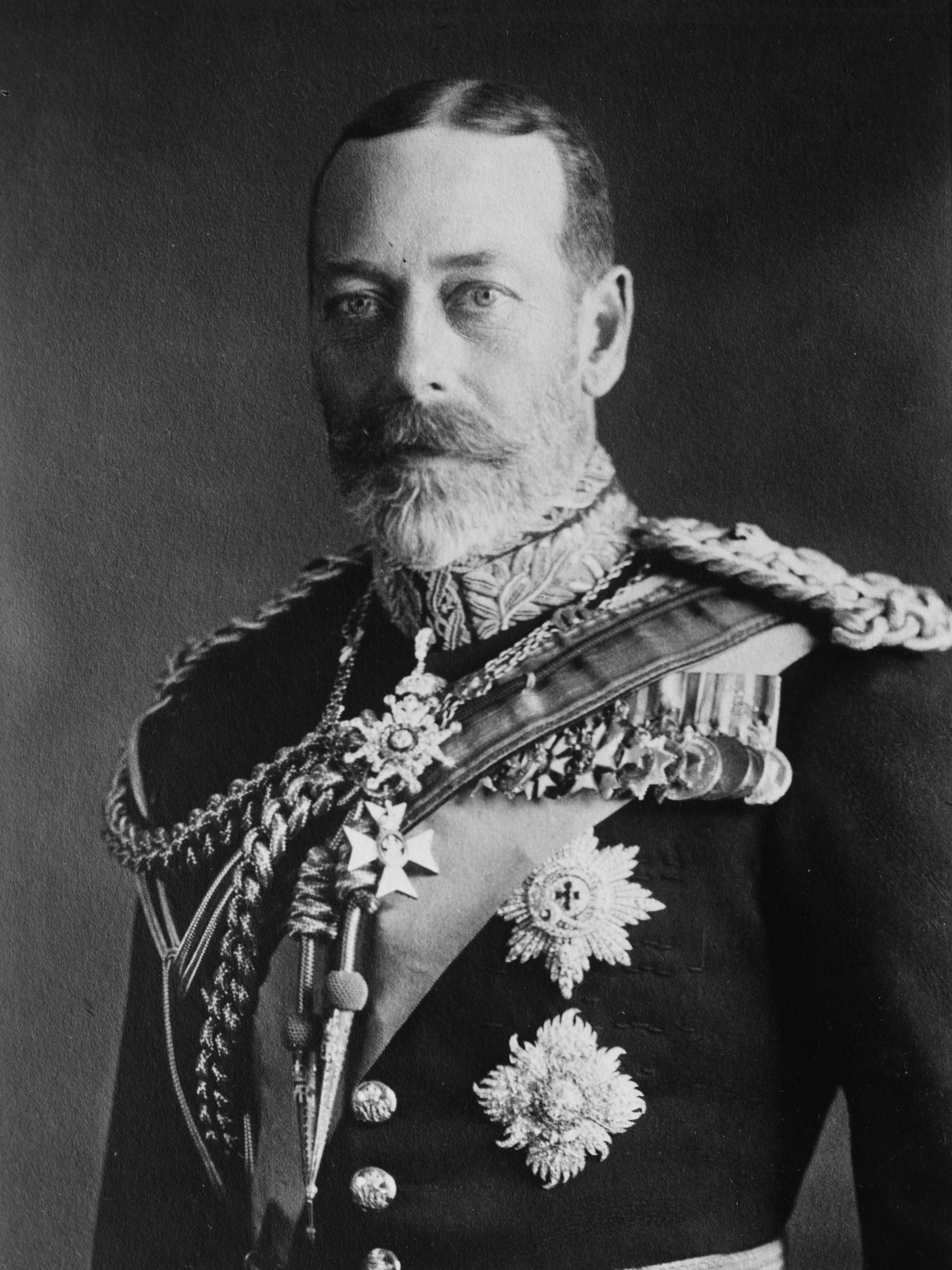
King George V wearing the Royal Victorian Chain in 1923

The chain is in gold, decorated with motifs of Tudor rose, thistle, shamrock, and lotus flower (symbolizing England, Scotland, Ireland, and India, respectively) and a crowned, red enamelled cypher of King Edward VII—ERI (Edwardus Rex Imperator)—surrounded by a gold wreath for men, upon which the badge is suspended. The chain is worn around the collar by men or with the four motifs and some chain links fixed to a riband in the form of bow (blue with red-white-red edges) on the left shoulder by women. However, Queen Elizabeth II's sister, Princess Margaret, Countess of Snowdon, in later life chose to wear her chain around the collar, as male recipients do.

The badge is a gold, white enamelled Maltese cross; the oval-shaped central medallion depicts Victoria's royal and imperial cypher—VRI (Victoria Regina Imperatrix)—on a red background, surrounded by a crown-surmounted blue ring bearing the word Victoria. Both the crown and Queen Victoria's cypher are studded with diamonds.

== Eligibility and allocation ==
The Royal Victorian Chain does not confer upon its recipients any style, title or postnominal letters, nor does it give precedence within any Commonwealth honours system. However, it represents a personal token of high distinction and esteem from the monarch. The chain can be conferred upon men and women of any nationality.

It has normally served as the senior award for Canadians, who are generally ineligible to receive titular honours under federal Cabinet policy. Only two Canadians have thus far been decorated with the chain: Vincent Massey and Roland Michener, both former governors general.

The Royal Victorian Chain is usually granted to holders of the office of Archbishop of Canterbury, often just after their retirement. The only holders of that title not to receive the decoration since its inception are William Temple, who died in office, and Justin Welby, who resigned in 2025.

The Royal Victorian Chain must be returned on the death of the recipient.

== List of living recipients ==
Country	Name	Known for	Year of conferral	Present age	Notes
Denmark	Queen Margrethe II of Denmark LG	Queen of Denmark	1974 as Queen; abdicated 2024	86	On the occasion of her state visit to the United Kingdom
Sweden	King Carl XVI Gustaf of Sweden KG	King of Sweden	1975	80	Honorary Admiral in the Royal Navy; on the occasion of his state visit to the United Kingdom
Netherlands	Princess Beatrix of the Netherlands LG, GCVO	Queen of the Netherlands	1982 as Queen; abdicated 2013	88	On the occasion of her state visit to the United Kingdom
Portugal	António Ramalho Eanes GCB	President of Portugal	1985	91	On the occasion of the state visit by Elizabeth II to Portugal
Spain	King Juan Carlos I of Spain KG	King of Spain	1986 as King; abdicated 2014	88	On the occasion of his state visit to the United Kingdom
United Kingdom	George Carey, Baron Carey of Clifton PC	Archbishop of Canterbury	2002	91	On the occasion of his retirement from office
United Kingdom	Rowan Williams, Baron Williams of Oystermouth PC, FBA, FRSL, FLSW	Archbishop of Canterbury	2012	76	On the occasion of his retirement from office
United Kingdom	William Peel, 3rd Earl Peel GCVO, PC, DL	Lord Chamberlain	2021	79	On the occasion of his retirement from office

== See also ==
- List of recipients of the Royal Victorian Chain
- List of Canadian awards
