= George Mooring =

British Civil Servant of 20th Century

Sir Arthur Mooring KCMG
- Born: Arthur George Rixson Mooring; 23 November 1908
- Died: 13 January 1969 (aged 60)
- Education: Bedford Modern School
- Alma mater: Queens' College, Cambridge

Sir Arthur George Rixson Mooring KCMG (23 November 1908 – 13 January 1969) was a British colonial civil servant and British Resident to Zanzibar from 1959 to 1964.

== Life ==
George Mooring was born in Dunstable, Bedfordshire on 23 November 1908, the son of the editor of the Bedford Gazette. He was educated at Bedford Modern School and Queens' College, Cambridge where he read Modern Languages and as a dedicated rowing man, he coached the Queens' boat.

He entered the Colonial Service in 1931 and was sent to Nigeria where he served in every Province in the North. He joined the Royal West African Frontier Force, and at the outbreak of war in 1939 was called up and served with them for four years in the Arakan, Burma, fighting like commandos to keep the Japanese away from India. He was mentioned in dispatches and gained the rank of lieutenant colonel. Upon demobilisation he returned to Nigeria, being posted to the Finance Department of the Secretariat in Lagos and after 2 years to Ibadan, where he rose to become Minister of Finance of the Western Region. When the Deputy Governor had to return to the United Kingdom due to sudden illness, Mooring took his place and found himself Acting Governor for the three months interim between Western Governors. He was knighted in 1958.

In 1959 he became the British Resident Zanzibar for 5 years, and was awarded the KCMG in 1960. Independence having been urged by the British government, against his advice, this was granted in 1963 and his tour of duty was cut by a year. The Sultan of Zanzibar awarded him the Brilliant Star of Zanzibar, First Class. A month later revolution broke out, causing a great many deaths and other miseries, and Mooring was called upon by the British Government to help the Sultan and his enormous entourage to settle in England.

During the next 5 years he undertook Economic and Boundary Commission's to the Gilbert & Ellice Islands, Sierra Leone and Antigua. He became Chairman of the Civil Service Commission. He had married Patricia Josephine Downman (née Hare-Duke) in 1947 and they had a son, William, born in 1949 and a daughter, Julia, born in 1951. They settled in Earl Soham in Suffolk where Mooring sat on a number of local committees, delighted in his large garden, and enjoyed some ocean-going sailing. He died of cancer in 1969.

Mooring's papers are held at the Bodleian Library.
