= George Cakobau =

Former Governor General of Fiji

His Excellency Ratu Sir George Kadavulevu Cakobau GCMG GCVO KStJ OBE
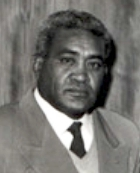

2nd Governor-General of Fiji
- In office 13 January 1973 – 12 February 1983
- Monarchs: Elizabeth II, Queen of Fiji
- Prime Minister: Kamisese Mara
- Preceded by: Sir Robert Sidney Foster
- Succeeded by: Ratu Sir Penaia Ganilau

Personal details
- Born: 6 November 1912 Bau, Colony of Fiji, British Empire
- Died: 25 November 1989 (aged 77) Bau, Fiji
- Spouse(s): Adi Veniana Gavoka; Lady Lelea Seruwaia Balekiwai
- Relations: Ratu Popi Seniloli (father); Ratu Josefa Celua (grandfather)
- Children: 7, including Adi Samanunu Cakobau-Talakuli, Adi Litia Cakobau, Ratu George Cakobau Jr., Ratu Epenisa Cakobau
- Education: Queen Victoria School; Newington College; Wanganui Technical College

Military service
- Rank: Captain

Ratu Sir George Kadavulevu Cakobau GCMG GCVO KStJ OBE (6 November 1912 – 25 November 1989) was a Fijian statesman and athlete. A great-grandson of Ratu Seru Epenisa Cakobau, the paramount chief of Bau who had unified all the tribes of Fiji under his reign in the mid-1800s, Ratu Sir George held the traditional titles of Vunivalu of Bau and Tui Levuka and thus was considered by many as Fiji's highest-ranking traditional chief. Ratu Cakobau was appointed Governor-General of Fiji in 1973, becoming the first indigenous Fijian to serve as the viceregal representative of Elizabeth II, Queen of Fiji.

== Education and early career ==
Cakobau was educated first at Fiji's Queen Victoria School, then at Newington College in Australia (1927–1932) and Wanganui Technical College in Wanganui, New Zealand. He became a member of the Great Council of Chiefs in 1938, where he remained until 1972. When he first joined the Council, it had the power to make laws for the ethnic Fijian population, but this power was removed towards the end of the colonial era, as modern political institutions were built.

Cakobau served with the Royal Fiji Military Forces in World War II (1939–1945), rising to the rank of captain. Following his return to Fiji after the end of the war, he was nominated to the Legislative Council in 1951 to replace the deceased George Toganivalu. He remained a member of this body, which was renamed the House of Representatives when Fiji became independent in 1970 as the Dominion of Fiji until his appointment as Governor-General. He served in the Cabinet, first as Minister for Fijian Affairs and Local Government and subsequently as a minister without portfolio, from 1970 to 1972.

== Governor-General of Fiji ==
One significant event marked Cakobau's tenure as Governor-General. In March 1977, a constitutional crisis developed following a general election that gave a narrow majority to the Indo-Fijian dominated National Federation Party (NFP). Three days after the election, the NFP splintered in a leadership brawl, and Cakobau, acting as Fiji's effective head of state, then called on the defeated Prime Minister, Ratu Sir Kamisese Mara, to form a new government, pending fresh elections (which were held in September, and resulted in a landslide win for Mara's Alliance Party).

In a public statement, Cakobau defended his actions thus: "In the recent general election, the people of Fiji did not give a clear mandate to either of the major political parties. It, therefore, became the duty of the Governor-General under the Constitution to appoint as Prime Minister the Member of the House of Representatives who appeared to him best able to command the support of the majority of the Members of the House. The Governor-General has not been able to act sooner as it was not until this afternoon that he was informed who had been elected leader of the National Federation Party. The Governor-General, after taking all relevant circumstances into account, has come to the firm conclusion that the person best able to command support of the majority of the Members is the Leader of the Alliance Party, Ratu Sir Kamisese Mara. In compliance with the Constitution and acting in his own deliberate judgment the Governor-General has accordingly appointed Ratu Sir Kamisese as Prime Minister."

Although Cakobau's actions were unquestionably constitutional, they were controversial. Despite the disarray in the NFP, many people, especially in the Indo-Fijian community, were outraged at his role in usurping a popular election, in what many Indo-Fijians saw as a blatant move to protect the privileged position of his fellow Fijian chiefs, who dominated the Mara government.

== Honours ==
Cakobau was decorated with many honours during his lifetime. Among these was Royal Victorian Chain, a rare and prestigious honour awarded as a sign of the special relationship between Fiji and the Monarchy, following the visit of Queen Elizabeth II in 1982. He was a Freemason.

== Sport ==
Cakobau played four first-class cricket matches for Fiji during their 1947–48 tour to New Zealand. Cakobau made his debut first-class debut against Auckland and played his fourth and final first-class match on tour against Otago.

In his four first-class matches Cakobau scored 176 runs at a batting average of 25.14, with a single half-century score of 67* coming against Wellington. With the ball, he took 5 wickets at a bowling average of 52.00, with best figures of 2/48. Additionally, he took 3 catches in the field.

During the tour to New Zealand, Cakobau also played 9 non-first-class matches for Fiji, with his final match coming against Hawke's Bay.

He also played a rugby union Test match for Fiji in 1939, against a New Zealand Maori team at Hamilton. Fiji won by 10 points, with Cakobau contributing two points, through a conversion.

== Personal life and legacy ==
Ratu Sir George Cakobau's father was Ratu Popi, and his grandfather was Ratu Celua, the youngest son of the Vunivalu, Ratu Cakobau.

Cakobau was married twice, first to Adi Veniana Gavoka then to Lady Lelea Seruwaia Balekiwai. Several of his children have distinguished themselves in public service. Adi Samanunu Talakuli has held Cabinet office and has been her country's High Commissioner to Malaysia, before being appointed to the Senate in June 2006. Ratu George Cakobau Jr. and Adi Litia Cakobau also served in the Senators from 2001 to 2006. His youngest son, Ratu Tanoa Cakobau, was President of the Conservative Alliance, the junior partner in the ruling coalition from 2001 to 2006.

Cakobau retired from office in 1983, but as Fiji's traditional Paramount Chief, he remained influential until his death in 1989.

Ratu Epenisa Cakobau was installed as Ratu Sir George's successor as Vunivalu of Bau on the 10th of March 2023.

== Bibliography ==
- 20th Century Fiji, edited by Stewart Firth & Daryl Tarte – 2001 – ISBN 982-01-0421-1, Details on Ratu George Cakobau and his life.

Government offices
Preceded by Sir Robert Sidney Foster	Governor-General of Fiji; 1973–1983	Succeeded by Ratu Sir Penaia Ganilau
Regnal titles
Preceded by Ratu Popi Seniloli	Vunivalu of Bau	Succeeded by Ratu Epenisa Cakobau
