= Derek Jakeway =

British colonial administrator (1915–1993)

Derek Jakeway KCMG OBE
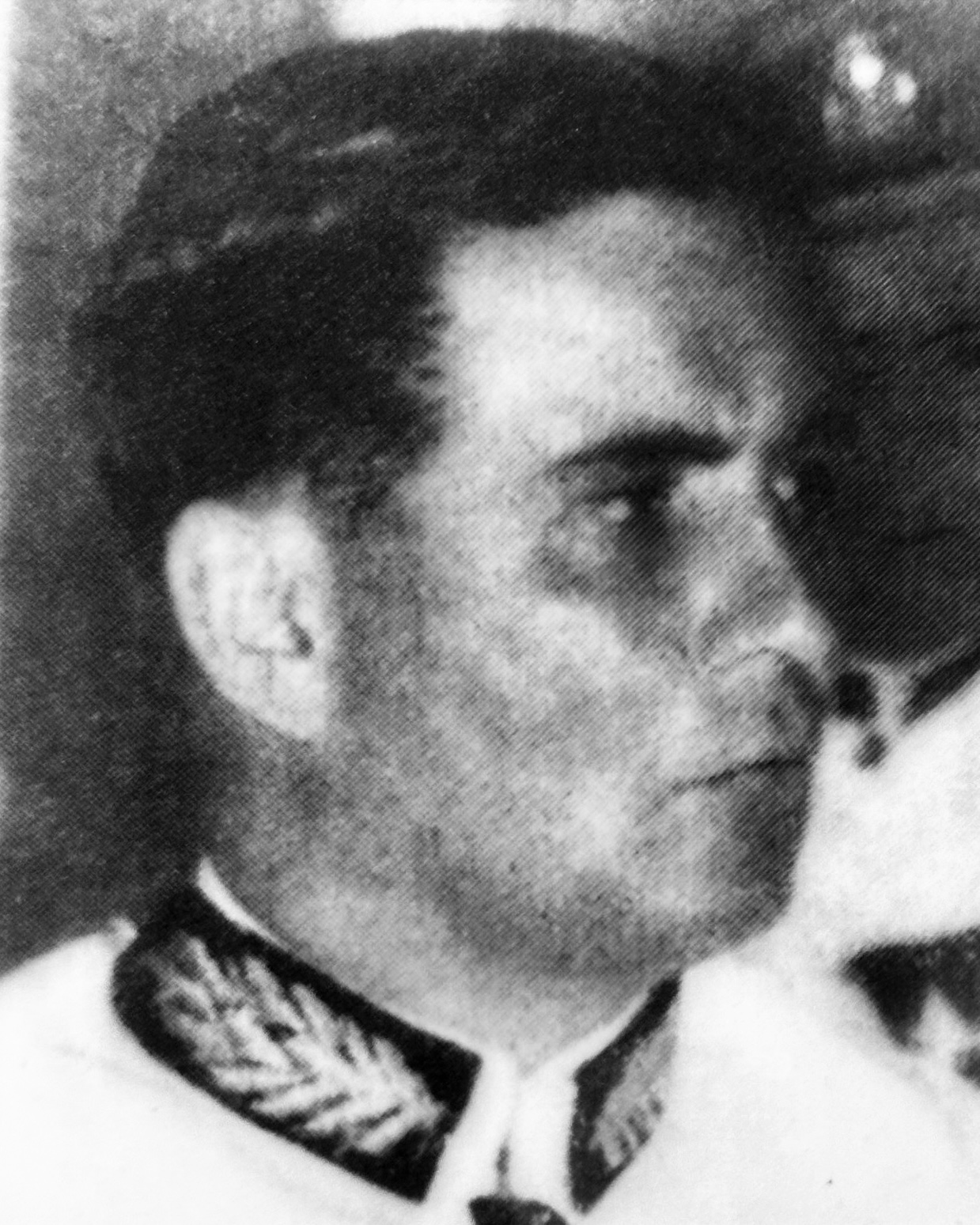
- Jakeway during the 1959 Bruneian Constitution signing

21st Governor of Fiji
- In office 6 January 1964 – December 1968
- Monarch: Elizabeth II
- Chief Minister: Kamisese Mara
- Preceded by: Sir Kenneth Maddocks
- Succeeded by: Sir Robert Foster

Chief Secretary of Sarawak
- In office April 1958 – 22 July 1963
- Governor: Anthony Abell
- Succeeded by: John Pike

Personal details
- Born: 6 June 1915
- Died: 6 November 1993 (aged 78) Exmouth, Devon, England
- Spouse: Phyllis Watson (m. 1941)
- Children: 3 sons
- Education: Exeter College, Oxford
- Occupation: Colonial administrator

Francis Derek Jakeway KCMG OBE (6 June 1915 – 6 November 1993) was a British colonial administrator, who was a key figure in shaping Fiji's post-colonial political landscape, used his academic background and diplomatic skill to challenge traditional systems, advocating for a more inclusive and democratic approach to governance.

== Early life and education ==
Francis Derek Jakeway, born on 6 June 1915, was educated at Hele's School in Exeter before attending Exeter College, Oxford.

== Career ==
=== Colonial Nigeria ===
Jakeway's career in the Colonial Administrative Service began in Nigeria in 1937, where he served for 17 years, with postings to Seychelles and the Colonial Office (CO). In 1954, he was appointed chief secretary of British Guiana in 1959.

=== Crown Colony of Sarawak ===
Prior to Sarawak's union with Malaysia, he served as Sarawak's chief secretary beginning in April 1959. As Chief Secretary of the Crown Colony of Sarawak, he oversaw the final years of British colonial rule and merger into the Federation of Malaysia. As an experienced colonial administrator, he was a central figure in the Sarawak Civil Service. Acting as acting Governor in September 1959, Jakeway formalised a treaty with the Sultan of Brunei, officially ending a ten year administrative association between the two territories.

=== Governor of Fiji ===
His influence continued to grow as he became Governor and Commander-in-Chief of Fiji in 1964. There, he led Fiji's journey toward independence, implementing localised governance and civil service reforms, and establishing a multiracial government framework. On 23 April 1964, Governor Jakeway officially opened the Derrick Technical Institute in Suva, honouring Ronald Albert Derrick, Fiji's first technical education supervisor, historian, and author.

Governor Jakeway and A. D. Patel clashed over key constitutional issues during Eirene White’s visit to Fiji. Eirene White gathered various viewpoints on matters like Muslim separate representation, Fijian political leadership, and the idea of restoring Fiji to the Fijians, a stance supported by some nationalists. Patel, concerned about Fijian autonomy, criticized the colonial government and advocated for political unity, especially regarding the common roll. Tensions with Jakeway, exacerbated by his Australian speech, further strained the discussions.

The talks collapsed over the issue of the common roll, with Patel withdrawing after the Fiji Times misrepresented his views. This fueled further division between Fijian and European politicians, worsened Patel's relationship with Jakeway, and reduced the likelihood of a successful outcome in London. Meanwhile, in the early 1960s, concerns about land ownership in Fiji were heightened. While Fijians feared losing land to Indo-Fijians, Indo-Fijian politicians focused on land lease terms. Jakeway supported legislation that would strengthen tenants' rights, but while seen as a step forward, it created resentment among Fijians. The CO hoped this would pave the way for future political cooperation.

In order to get an agreement on electoral changes, Governor Jakeway collaborated with Fijian leaders such as Kamisese Mara and John Falvey during the constitutional negotiations in Fiji. He looked at the prospect of establishing a restricted common roll, but the Fijians, who preferred communal representation, did not seem to be very supportive. Tensions between the Indo-Fijian and Fijian populations resulted from the CO's determination to impose a system of cross-voting seats despite efforts to win Fijian consent. In order to promote ties across the many ethnic groups, Jakeway remained a supporter of the Alliance Party after the negotiations. This multiracial political organisation went on to establish the government after Fiji's 1966 elections.

Jakeway also aimed to address the issue of emigration from Fiji, particularly the departure of talented Indo-Fijians to the United States and Canada, by proposing viable solutions such as a bond system. People like Patel pushed for amendments to the controversial 1965 constitution conference, believing that Indo-Fijians would be disadvantaged by the new political structure. Despite his support for gradual independence, Jakeway's stance and the changing political climate continued to provoke discussions, particularly over racial integration and the constitution's long-term sustainability. Governor Jakeway, who left Fiji in December 1968, recommended replacing communal electoral systems with cross-voting to promote democracy and resolve political unrest. He, along with Chief Secretary Peter Lloyd, argued for a non-racial election system that would be internationally accepted. His proposal aimed to move away from communalism and align with broader democratic principles, reflecting the controversial views of Professor de Smith. His strategy sought to establish a more inclusive electoral system to gain global legitimacy.

In 1967, he became the first sitting governor to visit the remote Pitcairn Island. Following his South Pacific service, Jakeway returned to England and chaired Devon's Health Authority for nearly a decade.

== Personal life ==
Jakeway married Phyllis Watson in 1941. Together they had three sons.

== Honours ==
Jakeway was awarded the Order of the British Empire (OBE) in 1948 and was created a Companion of the Order of St Michael and St George (CMG) in 1956. In 1963, he was made a Knight Commander of the Order of St Michael and St George (KCMG).

- United Kingdom
  - Knight Commander of the Order of St Michael and St George (KCMG) (1963)
  - Companion of the Order of St Michael and St George (CMG) (1956)
  - Officer of the Order of the British Empire (OBE) (1948)

== Bibliography ==
  - Lal, Brij V. (2008), "Towards Independence", A Time Bomb Lies Buried, Fiji's Road to Independence, 1960-1970, vol. 1, ANU Press, ISBN 978-1-921313-60-8
- Talib, N. S. (1999). Administrators and their service: The Sarawak administrative service under the Brooke Rajahs and British colonial rule. Oxford University Press. https://dokumen.pub/administrators-and-their-service-the-sarawak-administrative-service-under-the-brooke-rajahs-and-british-colonial-rule-9835600317-9789835600319.html

Government offices
Preceded by Sir Kenneth Maddocks	Governor of Fiji; 1964–1968	Succeeded by Sir Robert Sidney Foster
