= George Cakobau Jr. =

Fijian chief and political leader

Ratu George Kadavulevu Cakobau Jr., also known as Ratu Joji (14 April 1948 – 25 June 2018), was a Fijian chief and senator. He was the eldest son of the late Governor-General and 12th Vunivalu of Bau (widely considered to be Fiji's most paramount chiefly position) Ratu Sir George Cakobau, through his first wife Adi Veniana Gavoka, and was a great-great-grandson of King Seru Epenisa Cakobau, the warlord who established the first unified Kingdom of Fiji in 1871 and ceded it to the United Kingdom in 1874.

A meeting of elders from the Tui Kaba clan, to which Ratu Joji belonged, tentatively proposed him as the next Vunivalu in June 2005, but the position, vacant since the death of his father in 1989, remained so until filled by his half-brother on the 10th of March 2023.

After a career in the military, Ratu Joji was appointed to the Senate in 2001 by the Great Council of Chiefs, having been nominated by the Tailevu Provincial Council and served until 2006. He died due to illness and was reconciled with his brother.
