= Governor-General of Fiji =

Representative of the monarch

- Coat of arms of Fiji

- Flag of the governor-general
- Style: His Excellency
- Status: Abolished
- Residence: Government House, Suva
- Appointer: Monarch of Fiji
- Formation: 10 October 1970
- First holder: Sir Robert Sidney Foster
- Final holder: Ratu Sir Penaia Ganilau
- Abolished: 6 October 1987
- Succession: President of Fiji

The governor-general of Fiji was the representative of the Fijian monarch in the Dominion of Fiji from the country's independence in 1970 until the monarchy's deposition in 1987.

== History ==
Prior to independence, the representative of the British monarch was the Governor of Fiji whilst it was a part of the British Empire. Fiji became a sovereign state and adopted an independent monarch in the Commonwealth of Nations on 10 October 1970, with Queen Elizabeth II as Fiji's monarch. She held the title of Queen of Fiji until 1987, when the monarchy was deposed following two military coups, led by Lieutenant Colonel Sitiveni Rabuka. During the first coup by Colonel Sitiveni Rabuka, Rabuka knelt and presented a tabua to Governor-General Ganilau to affirm his loyalty to the Queen. During the second coup, Ganilau initially declared he would not recognise the declaration of a republic, but later formally wrote to the Queen, asking to be released as Governor-General.

The monarch's functions were exercised in Fiji by her representative, the governor-general of Fiji.

In 1987, following the monarchy's overthrow, the position of governor-general was abolished. The Fijian monarch was replaced with a president as head of state. Ratu Sir Penaia Ganilau, the last governor-general of Fiji, was appointed as the first president of Fiji on 8 December 1987 after resigning from the position of the governor-general of Fiji on 15 October 1987.

== Flag ==
The flag of the Governor-General was different to other Commonwealth realm Governor-General flags. Whilst it still contained the Lion and Crown on a blue background in common with the others, the name of Fiji was written onto a tabua rather than on a scroll.

== List of governors-general of Fiji ==
Following is a list of people who have served as governor-general of Fiji.

No.	Portrait	Name (Birth–Death)	Term of office			Monarch
No.	Portrait	Name (Birth–Death)	Took office	Left office	Time in office	Monarch
1		Sir Robert Sidney Foster (1913–2005)	10 October 1970	13 January 1973	2 years, 95 days	Elizabeth II
2		Ratu Sir George Cakobau (1912–1989)	13 January 1973	12 February 1983	10 years, 30 days	Elizabeth II
3		Ratu Sir Penaia Ganilau (1918–1993)	12 February 1983	6 October 1987	4 years, 236 days	Elizabeth II

== See also ==
- Governor of Fiji
- List of heads of state of Fiji
- Monarchy of Fiji
- President of Fiji
