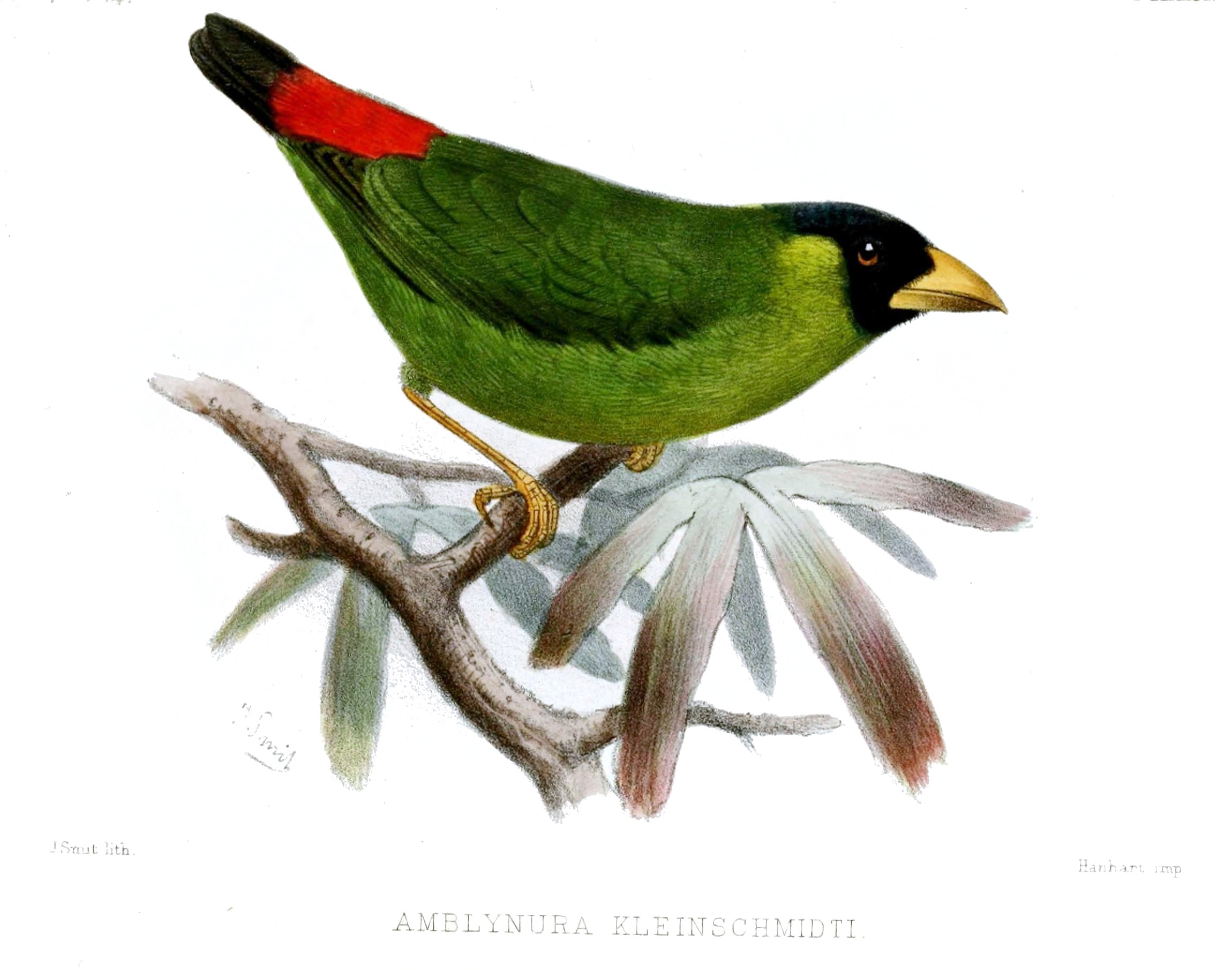

Conservation status
- Vulnerable (IUCN 3.1)

Scientific classification
- Kingdom: Animalia
- Phylum: Chordata
- Class: Aves
- Order: Passeriformes
- Family: Estrildidae
- Genus: Erythrura
- Species: E. kleinschmidti

Binomial name
- Erythrura kleinschmidti (Finsch, 1878)
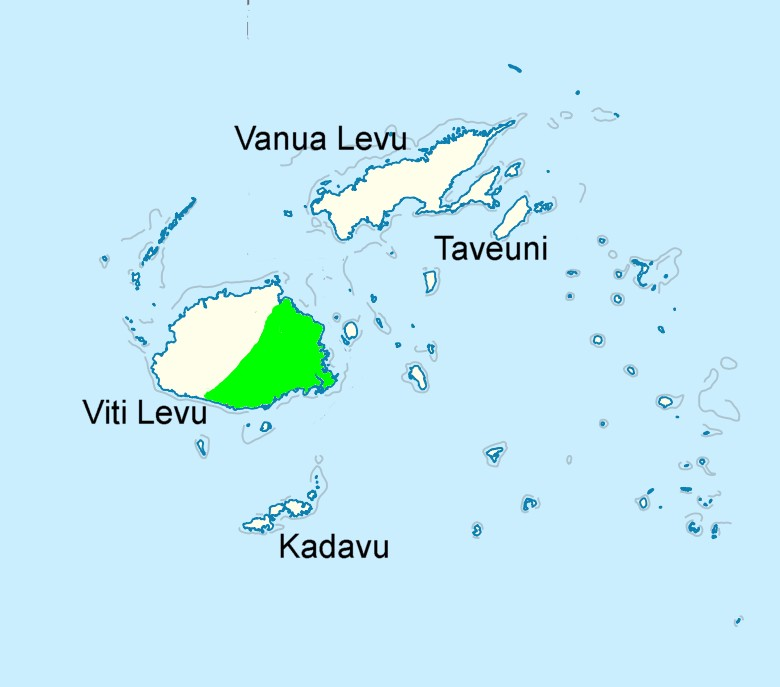
- Resident year-round

= Pink-billed parrotfinch =

Species of bird

The pink-billed parrotfinch (Erythrura kleinschmidti) is a species of estrildid finch found on the island of Viti Levu, Fiji. Commonly found at undisturbed mature forest in the centre and east of Viti Levu, e.g. Joske's Thumb near Suva. This species is found at mid-height along tree-trunks and branches, usually alone or in pairs but also joining mixed-species flocks, feeding primarily on insects, but also on flower buds and fruits.

== Taxonomy ==
The parrotfinches are a genus of estrildid finches found in southeast Asia and Australasia. They are small birds with short rounded wings and tails. Most species have green bodies, and all but one have the red tail that gives the genus its scientific name Erythrura, which is derived from the Ancient Greek ερυθρός erythros, 'red', and ουρά oura, 'tail'.

The pink-billed parrotfinch was initially described as Amblynura kleinschmidti by German naturalist Otto Finsch in 1878. The binomial name commemorates the German explorer and collector Theodor Kleinschmidt (1834–1881), who discovered the species on Viti Levu in 1877.

== Description ==
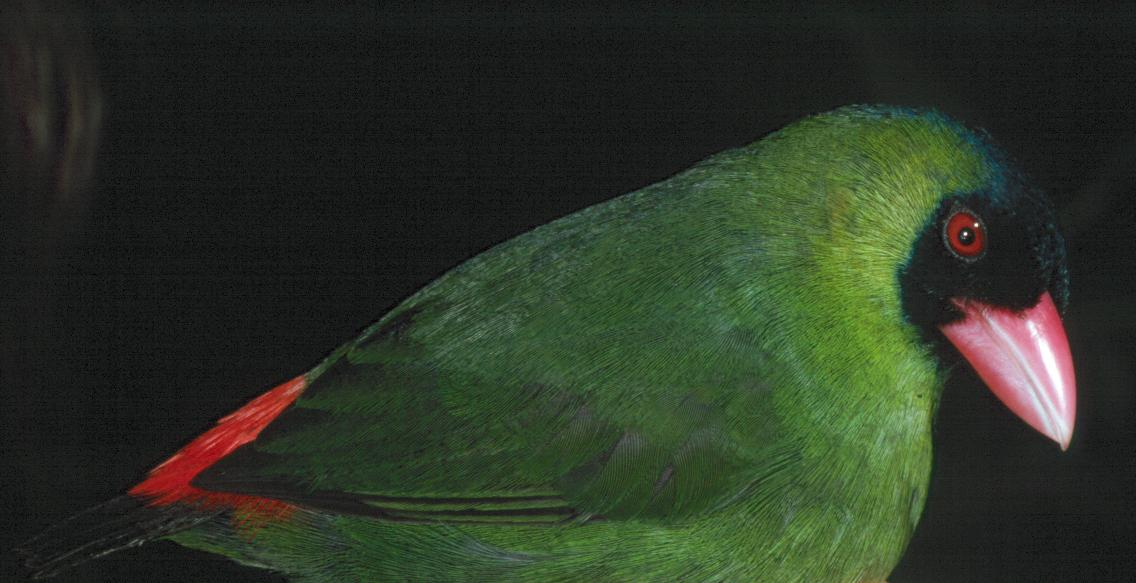
Pink-billed parrotfinch, Savura Creek, Viti Levu

This is a large and robust parrotfinch, 11 centimetres (4.3 in) in length, with a long pale pink bill much larger than that of other parrotfinches. The adult has mainly olive-green plumage, but it has a black face, blue crown and nape, and the bright red rump typical of the genus. Its eyes are brown or reddish-brown, and the legs and feet are pink or brownish-pink. The sexes are alike. The juvenile is like the adult, although its plumage is; slightly duller, and it has a pale orange bill with a dark tip. The call is a typical parrotfinch high pitched tsee tsee or cheee cheee cheee. A series of clicks may also be heard.

A related species, the Fiji parrotfinch, E. pealii, also occurs on Viti Levu. This locally common bird is smaller, and adults have a red head and a much smaller, dark bill. Immatures have a pale bill, but are brighter green than their larger relative.

== Distribution and habitat ==
The pink-billed parrotfinch is endemic to Fiji, thought to be only found in the wetter central and eastern parts of the largest island, Viti Levu but has also been observed on the Yasawa Islands to the north-west in 2012. This is a bird of undisturbed mature forest at any elevation, although it has been found to be common in one area of secondary forest, where it made a failed attempt to nest. It has disappeared from some previously occupied sites for reasons that are not known.

== Behaviour ==
This bird is usually found alone, in pairs or in small family groups, and is less gregarious than other parrotfinches. It is normally sedentary, but outside the breeding season it may join mixed-species foraging flocks. The only known nest was similar in shape to that of the Fiji parrotfinch, domed with a side entrance. It was constructed of dead leaves, including those of bamboo, small twigs and lichens.

This finch feeds mainly on insects, foraging on tree trunks and vines, and using its large bill to lever open likely hiding places, probe dead leaves, and crush twigs and tree fern stems. It will strip bark in a search for scale insects. It will also take flower buds, berries and fruit, but is not the specialised fig-eater it was once thought to be. Although it feeds mostly in trees, it will forage on the ground.

== Predators and parasites ==
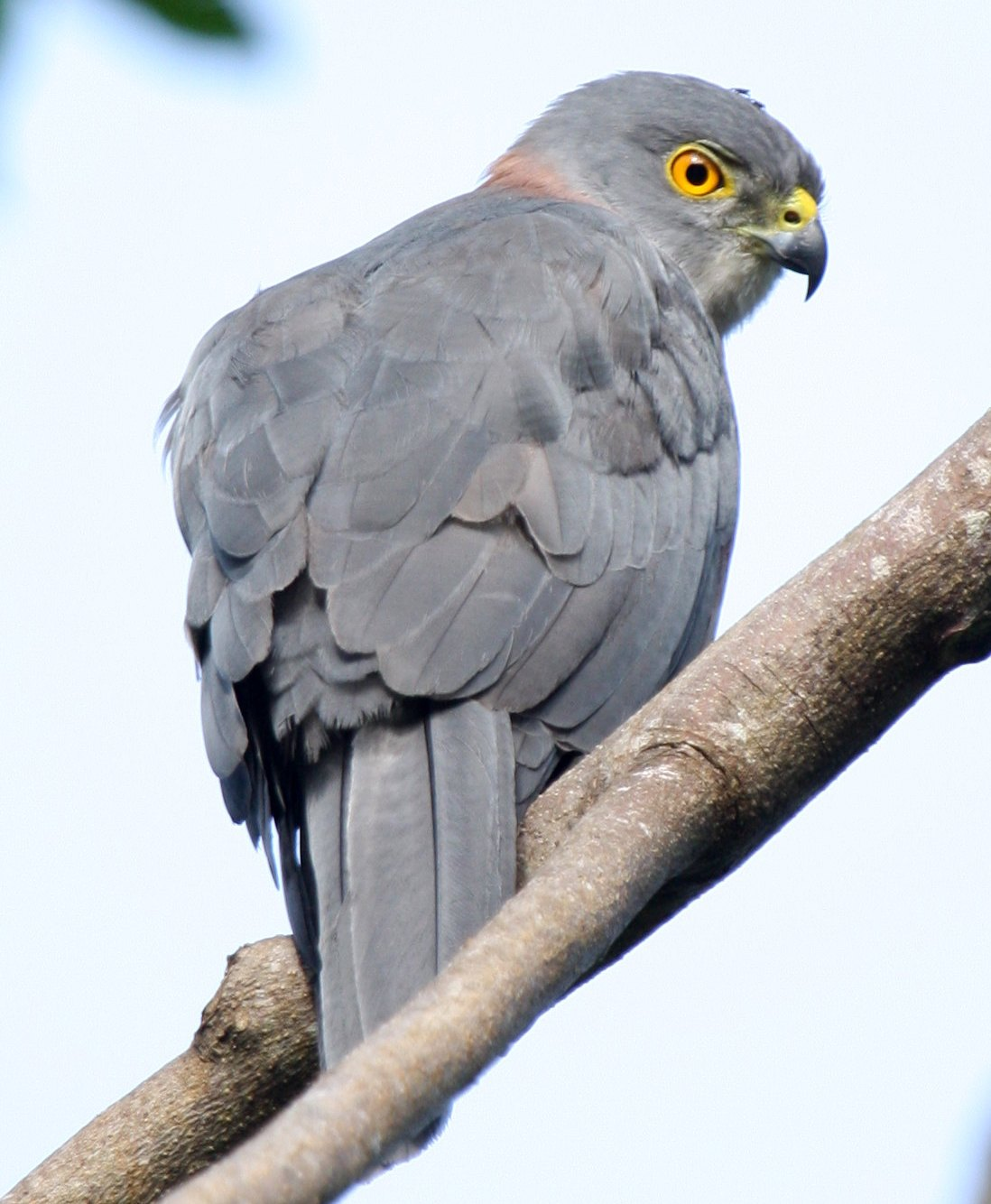
The endemic Fiji goshawk is a specialist predator of small birds

The common endemic Fiji goshawk is a specialist predator of small and medium-sized birds, and the swamp harrier is also a widespread predator, often taking fledglings. The local subspecies of the peregrine falcon. Falco peregrinus nesiotes will hunt finches, but is itself rare and declining. barn owls mainly eat rats, but sometimes take small birds. Rats and mice use Fiji parrotfinch nests, and may be significant predators of the species. The fan-tailed cuckoo, which has an endemic Fijian subspecies, is a brood parasite, but the parrotfinch does not appear to be a host of this large cuckoo.

No specific parasites of the pink-billed parrotfinch have been recorded, but microsporidiosis and avian malaria, both spread by parasites, have been found in captive populations of other parrotfinch species.

== Status ==
The pink-billed parrotfinch is endemic to the island of Viti Levu in its wetter central and eastern areas. It is fairly widespread in mature forests, but appears always to have been rare. A survey of prime habitat found birds at eight out of thirteen sites, with a density based on very limited information of 2.8 birds per km^{2} (7.3 per mi^{2}). Assuming 4,000 km^{2} (1,500 mi^{2}) of suitable habitat gives an estimated population of 2,500 to 9,999 mature individuals (3,750 to 14,999 total individuals).

Although the introduced mongoose has caused the decline in numbers of several ground-living birds on Viti Levu and Vanua Levu, the rarity of the pink-billed parrotfinch cannot be directly attributed to this or any other introduced vertebrate. The relatively small population is believed to be declining due to continuing deforestation, half of the island's mature woodland having already been cleared for agriculture or planting with mahogany. The best site, Joske's Thumb, was lost in the 1980s. The small population on a single island, together with the expected ongoing decline mean that this species is it is therefore classed as vulnerable on the IUCN Red List.

The pink-billed parrotfinch is protected under Schedule 1 of Fiji's Endangered and Protected Species Act 2002, which regulates the import and trade of species that are threatened with extinction.

It is being conserved in the protected watershed forest near Suva. It was proposed to find more suitable areas for pink-billed parrotfinch conservation, and preserve the watershed forest habitat near Suva in Appendix I, which lists all species which are or may be affected by trade.

== Cited texts ==
- Brookes, Ian, ed. (2006). The Chambers Dictionary, ninth edition. Edinburgh: Chambers. ISBN 0-550-10185-3.
- Clements, Peter; Harris, Alan; Davis, John (1993). Finches and Sparrows. Christopher Helm. ISBN 0-7136-8017-2.
- Watling, Dick (2003). A Guide to the Birds of Fiji and Western Polynesia. Tulani: Dick Watling. ISBN 982-9030-04-0.
