= Grand Pacific Hotel (Fiji) =

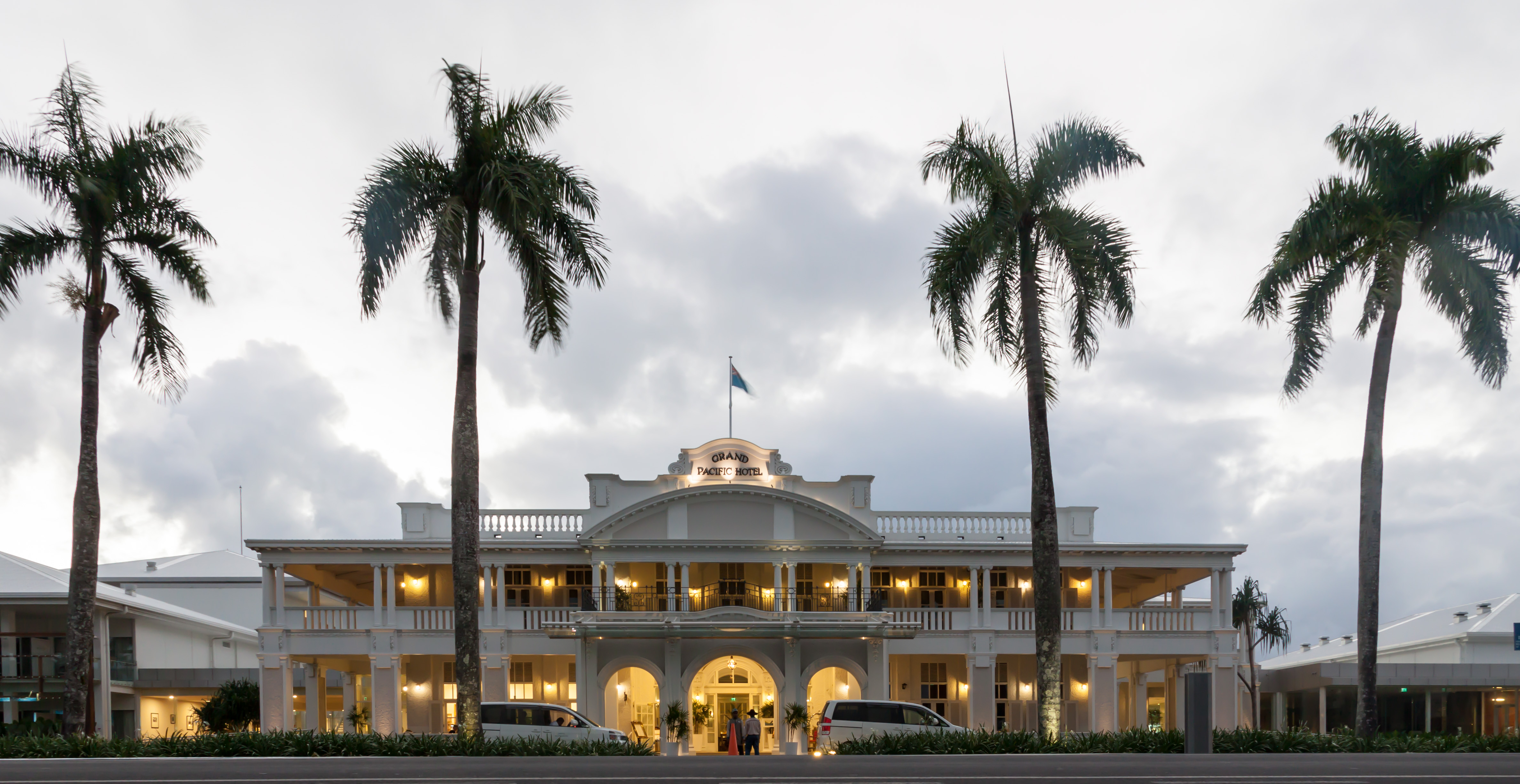
- The main entrance of the Grand Pacific Hotel on Victoria Parade, Suva.
- Interactive map of the Grand Pacific Hotel area

General information
- Type: Hotel
- Location: Victoria Parade, Suva, Fiji
- Coordinates: 18.1469°S 178.4225°E
- Construction started: 1910
- Completed: 1914
- Client: Union Steamship Company
- Owner: InterContinental Hotels Group (current)

Design and construction
- Architecture firm: Salmond & Vanes
- Main contractor: Hall Hogg & Company

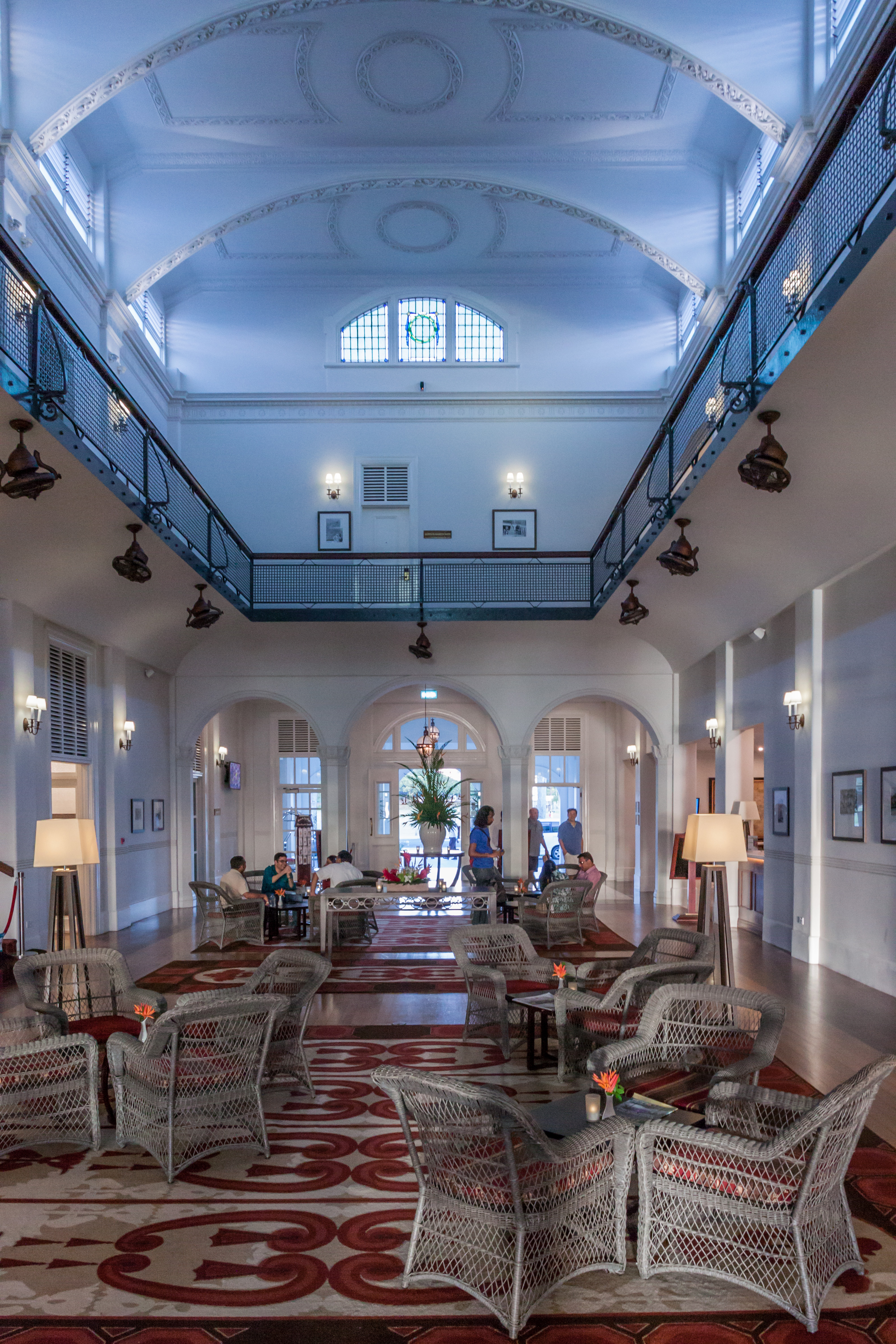
The lobby of the Grand Pacific Hotel in Suva, Fiji.

The Grand Pacific Hotel is a historic hotel built in 1914, located on the main sea front, on Victoria Parade in Suva, Fiji.

== History ==
In 1910 the Managing Director of the Union Steamship Company of New Zealand, Sir James Mills, commissioned plans for a hotel run by the company to serve the needs of passengers on its transpacific routes. A two-acre site on land reclaimed from Suva Harbour was chosen on the landing spot for the original Suva village, called Vu-ni-vesi after the trees nearby, and the hotel itself was designed by Salmond & Vanes ARIBA FNZIA, architects of Dunedin. Their design of the hotel was to make the passengers think they had never gone ashore, with rooms designed like first-class staterooms, complete with saltwater bathrooms and plumbing fixtures identical to those on an ocean liner. All rooms were on the second floor, and guests could step outside on a 15-foot (4.6 m)-wide veranda overlooking the harbour and walk completely around the building — as if walking on the deck. The style was colonial in emphasis, with high ceilings, louvred French doors and the wrap-around verandah that were all designed to maximise cool comfort in the tropical climate. Construction of the hotel in reinforced ferro-concrete was undertaken by Hall Hogg & Company of Dunedin, and the Hotel opened on 23 May 1914.

It was not long before the hotel became the centre of the colonial society in Suva, attracting not only tourists but all manner of official visits and grand balls to celebrate important visitors and events. In February 1915, former Australian Prime Minister Alfred Deakin stayed in the hotel on his way to San Francisco to serve as Australian Commissioner to the Panama–Pacific International Exposition. In 1916 writer Somerset Maugham was a guest at the hotel and provided a characteristically acerbic description of his stay there, noting: "It is cool and empty ... The servants are Hindus, silent and vaguely hostile ... the food is very bad but the rooms are pleasant, fresh and cool."

Australian journalist Thomas John McMahon visited Fiji in 1921 and provided his own description of the Grand Pacific Hotel in his profile of the island nation that was published in The Sydney Mail:

One thing Suva can boast of is the possession of the most palatial hotel in the Southern Hemisphere. It was here that the Prince of Wales was entertained. On steamer days — that is, when steamers are in from Australia, New Zealand, Canada, and America — the 'G.P.H.', as this comfortable hotel is termed, is a little world in itself, the like of which cannot, perhaps, be seen anywhere else. Tourists from all countries, and speaking all languages, assemble in the great public hall, and there are dancing and feasting, music and chatter. Natives dressed in fantastic garbs come to sell curios, beads, and mats. There is a continuous stream of motor-cars coming and going, and their tooting is deafening. The whole scene is one of the gayest and most animated imaginable, and there is little wonder that Suva is fast becoming one of the most attractive places for the globe-trotter and tourist.

In 1928 Sir Charles Kingsford Smith landed his plane into Albert Park near the hotel, having flown from California, en route to Australia to complete the first trans-Pacific flight from the United States to Australia. Before his departure, a ball was held in his and his crew's honour at the Grand Pacific Hotel on 6 June 1928. In July 1929, a reception was held at the hotel to receive the crew of the German cruiser Emden and their commander, Lothar von Arnauld de la Perière, as part of their worldwide tour. Other notable visitors include Lord Northcliffe (1921), Douglas Fairbanks (1935), James A Michener during his time writing Tales of the South Pacific in 1946–1947, and Noël Coward, who stayed for two weeks in 1962.

== Royal visits ==
When members of the British royal family visited Fiji, they stood atop the wrought-iron portico, the "bow" of the Grand Pacific, and addressed their subjects massed across Victoria Parade in Albert Park. The first Royal visit occurred in April 1920, with the reception of Prince Edward, Prince of Wales, during his tour to Australia and New Zealand on board HMS Renown. The Renown returned to Suva again en-route to Australia in February 1927, this time with The Duke and Duchess of York, who were also received at the hotel. In 1935 an official ball was held at the hotel to celebrate the visit of Prince Henry, Duke of Gloucester.

Queen Elizabeth II and Prince Philip, Duke of Edinburgh have stayed at the hotel on several occasions, the first being in 1953, followed by visits in 1973, 1977 and 1982. In 1970, Charles, Prince of Wales attended a state dinner at the hotel to celebrate Fiji’s Independence. The royal connection to the hotel has also continued since the 2014 reopening, with the Duke and Duchess of Sussex becoming the most recent members of the Royal Family to stay in the Royal Suite during their 2018 visit to Fiji.

== Later history ==
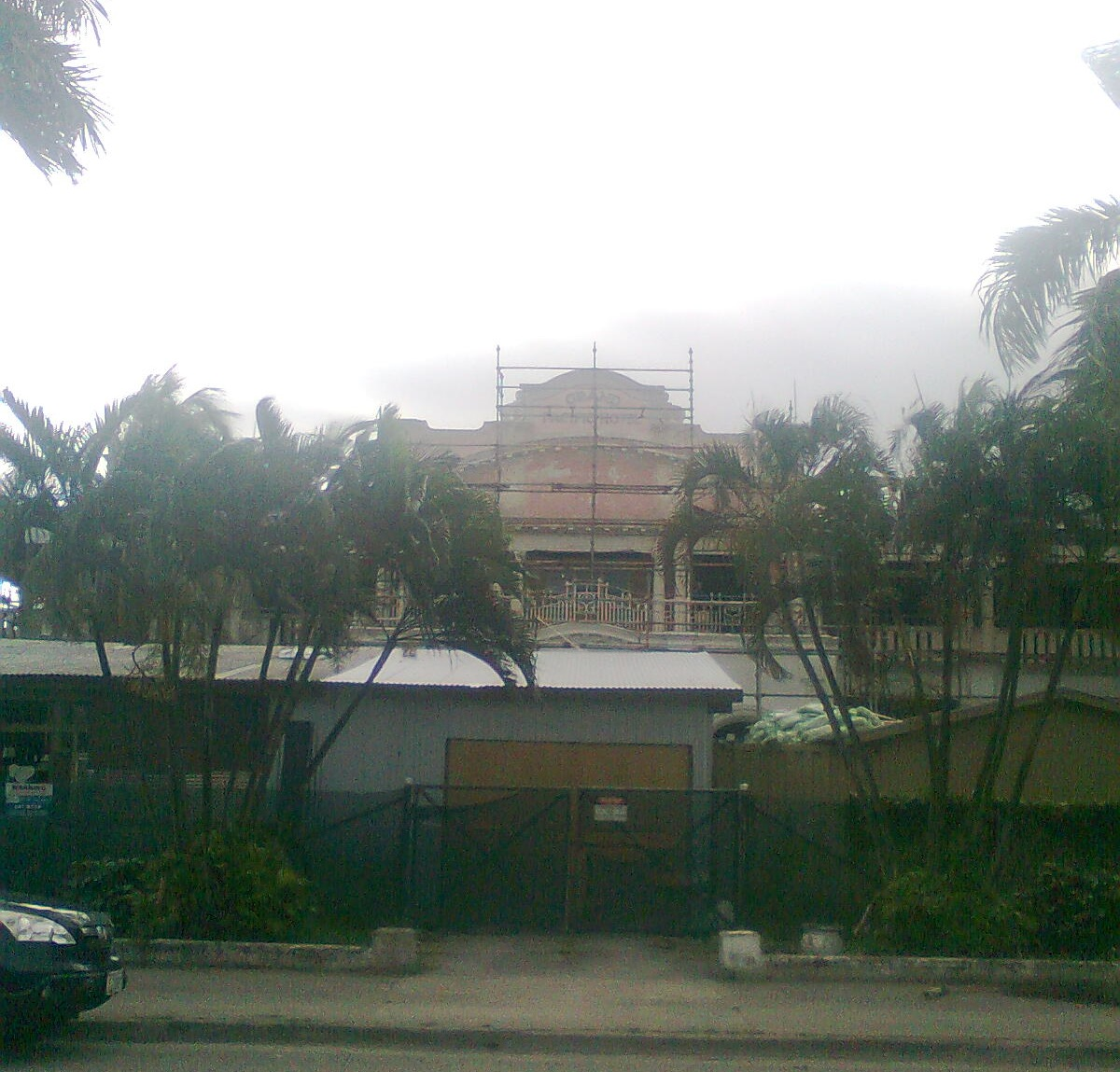
The Grand Pacific Hotel during renovation works prior to its reopening in 2014

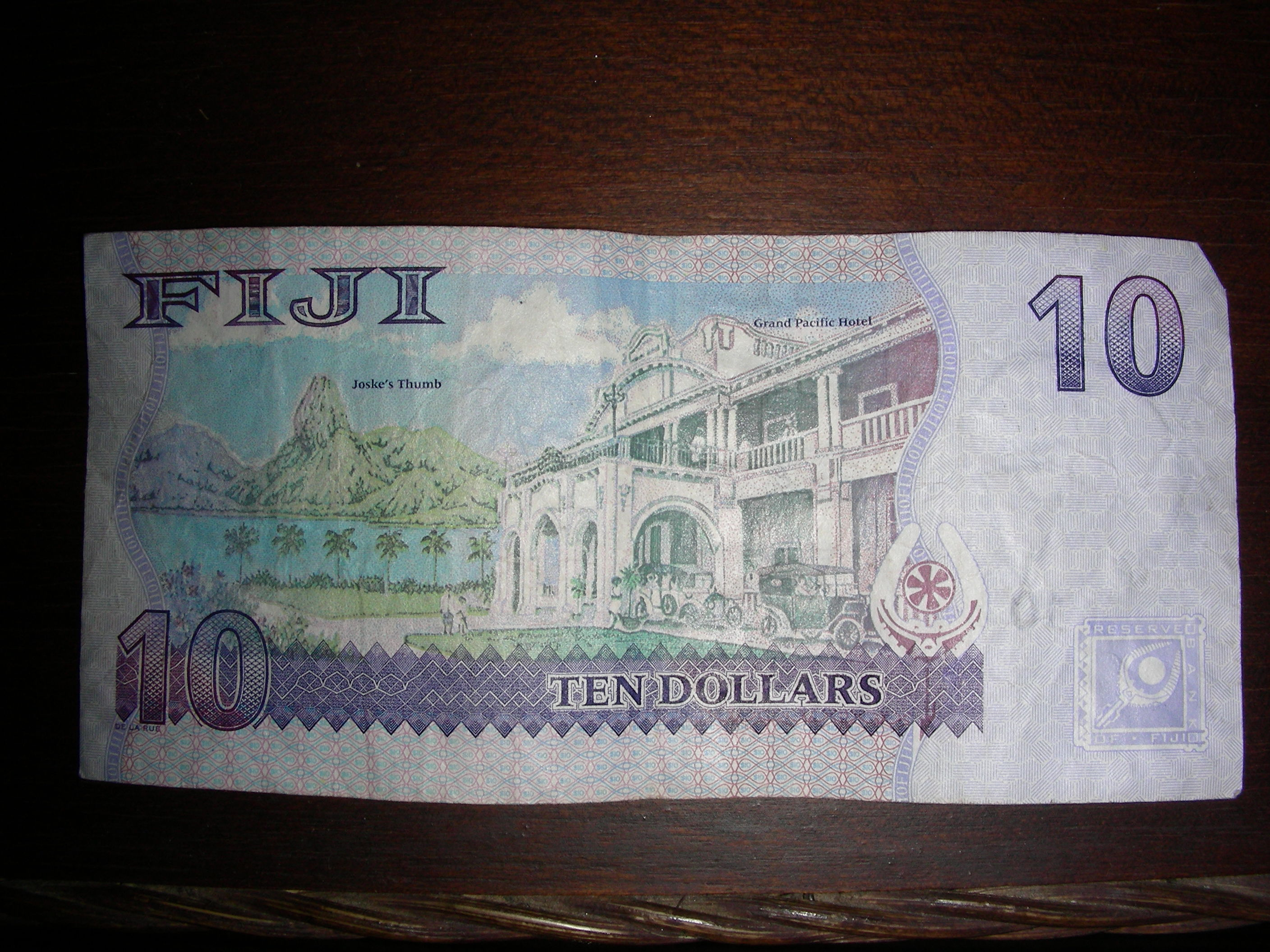
Joske's Thumb and the Grand Pacific Hotel depicted on the reverse of a 10 Fijian dollar note

In December 1958 the Union Steamship Company decided to relinquish their lease and the hotel was threatened with closure should a new owner/operator not be found, with the Fijian Government eventually receiving several offers from Singapore, the United States and within Fiji. Eventually the ownership of the Hotel was granted to the Fiji-based Cathay Hotels (Fiji) Ltd under the Chairmanship of Wesley Barrett, with various changes occurring to the hotel to accommodate a new class of tourists brought to Fiji from Pacific-based cruise ships. It was during this period that the exterior was painted pink and in 1960 an air-conditioned wing with 45 rooms was added, together with a swimming pool. However, the pink colour scheme was not well received, and in 1974 Barrett announced a new round of renovations aimed at recreating "the colonial style glory that won the hotel acclaim and a place in the writings of Somerset Maugham", including a return to the original white exterior and the restoration of interior spaces.

Nevertheless throughout the 1980s, the ageing hotel continued to decline and was sold in 1988 to the Nauru Government via the Nauru Phosphate Royalties Trust, who failed to prevent the hotel's closure in 1992. Despite many unsuccessful attempts between the Fijian Government and the Nauru Trust to reopen the hotel, the building continued to deteriorate and in March 2000 the Fijian Government of Mahendra Chaudhry expropriated the property with the intention of restoring and reopening the hotel. However, financial constraints and a decline in tourism as a result of political instability in the country, with coups occurring in 2000 and 2006, led to a stalling of the reopening plans.

However, with a gradual return to stability the Fijian Government restarted attempts to reopen the hotel, with the government-run Fijian Investment Corporation Ltd (FICL) assisting a joint venture between Papua New Guinea's Superannuation Fund (NASFUND), Fiji National Provident Fund (FNPF), and Lamana Developments of Papua New Guinea, announced by Prime Minister Frank Bainimarama on 8 August 2011. NASFUND has a 50% stake, while FNPF and Lamana have 25% stakes each. It was restored to a five-star hotel and re-opened on 24 May 2014, in time for the hotel's 100th anniversary.

InterContinental Hotels Group assumed management of the hotel in July 2020, and it is set to be rebranded as InterContinental Grand Pacific Hotel Suva, following a major renovation.
