= Coins of the Fijian dollar =

The coins of the Fijian dollar have been part of the physical form of Fiji's currency, the Fijian dollar.

== Decimal Coins of the Colony of Fiji (1969) ==
In 1969, the Colony of Fiji introduced the Fijian dollar at the rate of 2 dollars = 1 Fijian pound. Coins issued include 1, 2, 5, 10 and 20 cents. The 50 cent coin was issued in 1975 to replace the banknote of earlier issue.

Mint marks found on Fijian coins include (c) Royal Australian Mint, Canberra; (H) The Mint, Birmingham; (I) The Royal Mint, Llantrisant; (o) Royal Canadian Mint, Winnipeg; (S) San Francisco, USA.

== Coins of the Dominion of Fiji (1970–87) ==
Dominion of Fiji

== Coins of the Republic of Fiji outside the Commonwealth (1990–96) ==
In 1995 a $1 coin was issued with the same diameter as the pound sterling of aluminium bronze. All other coinage was the same as the 1969 issues, but the 1c. and 2c. were in copper-plated steel, and the 5c., 10c., 20c., and 50c. were in nickel-plated steel.

== Coins of the Republic of Fiji as a full member of the Commonwealth (1997–2010) ==
These coins still retained the Queen's head that was issued in 1985. As of 2006 there were coins of 1, 5, 10, 20, 50 Cents and 1 Dollar. Banknotes consist of 2, 5, 10, 20, 50 and 100 Dollars. The 1 Cent and 2 Cents were withdrawn and new smaller 5 to 50 Cents coins introduced in 2009.

== Coins of the Republic of Fiji as a suspended member state of the Commonwealth (2012–14) ==
After Fiji was fully suspended from the Commonwealth of Nations in September 2009, new coins featuring native animals in place of the Queen were minted by the Royal Canadian Mint in Winnipeg in 2012, becoming available in 2013. A circulation commemorative 50 Cents depicting Iliesa Delana on the obverse dated 2013 has now been put into circulation. A mintage figure of 500,000 coins has been confirmed by the Reserve Bank of Fiji in a statement by Governor Barry Whiteside.

== Coins of the Republic of Fiji as a full member of the Commonwealth (since 2014) ==
Fiji has put a circulating 50 Cents into circulation to commemorate the Fijian 7's rugby team's victory at the 2016 Olympic Games. The reverse depicts Ben Ryan, CF.

== See also ==
- Coins of the Fijian pound
