= Coins of the Fijian pound =

Various
- Fiji
- Value: Various Various

Obverse

Reverse

The coins of the Fijian pound were part of the physical form of Fiji's historical currency, the Fijian pound.

== Coins of King George V (1934-36) ==
King George V

Issued were ½ and 1 penny, 6 pence, 1 shilling and florin coins along with 10/-, 1 and 5 pound notes.

The ½ and 1 penny had a hole in the centre and were minted in copper-nickel, the others in silver. The two smallest coins depicts a crown and the sovereign's name on one side and the denomination, country, and year on the other. For the larger values the monarch's portrait appears on the obverse. On their reverses, the sixpence shows a turtle, the shilling an outrigger canoe, and the florin the coat of arms of the colony. The same designs were used by subsequent monarchs.

== Coins of King Edward VIII (1936) ==
King Edward VIII. Because of Edward's very short reign, this was a one-year issue. 120,000 pennies were issued bearing his name, with the legend "EDWARD VIII KING EMPEROR".

== Coins of King George VI as Emperor of India (1937-47) ==
King George VI as Emperor of India. The 1942 and 1943 coins all bear the "S" mintmark of the San Francisco mint. The two smaller denominations were minted in brass while the others were produced to the U.S. standard of .900 silver, rather than the British .500.

== Coins of King George VI as King only (1948-52) ==
The 12 sided Nickel-Brass three pence coin is the same size and weight as the British threepenny coin of the period. The reverse shows a traditional thatched building ("bure") flanked by palm trees. The design is by the New Zealand designer Reginald George James Berry.

== Coins of Queen Elizabeth II (1953-68) ==
Queen Elizabeth II coinage was issued in all denominations, between 1953 and 1968. The legend on these coins reads "QUEEN ELIZABETH THE SECOND".

== See also ==
- Coins of the Fijian dollar
