= Tabua =

Polished tooth of a sperm whale

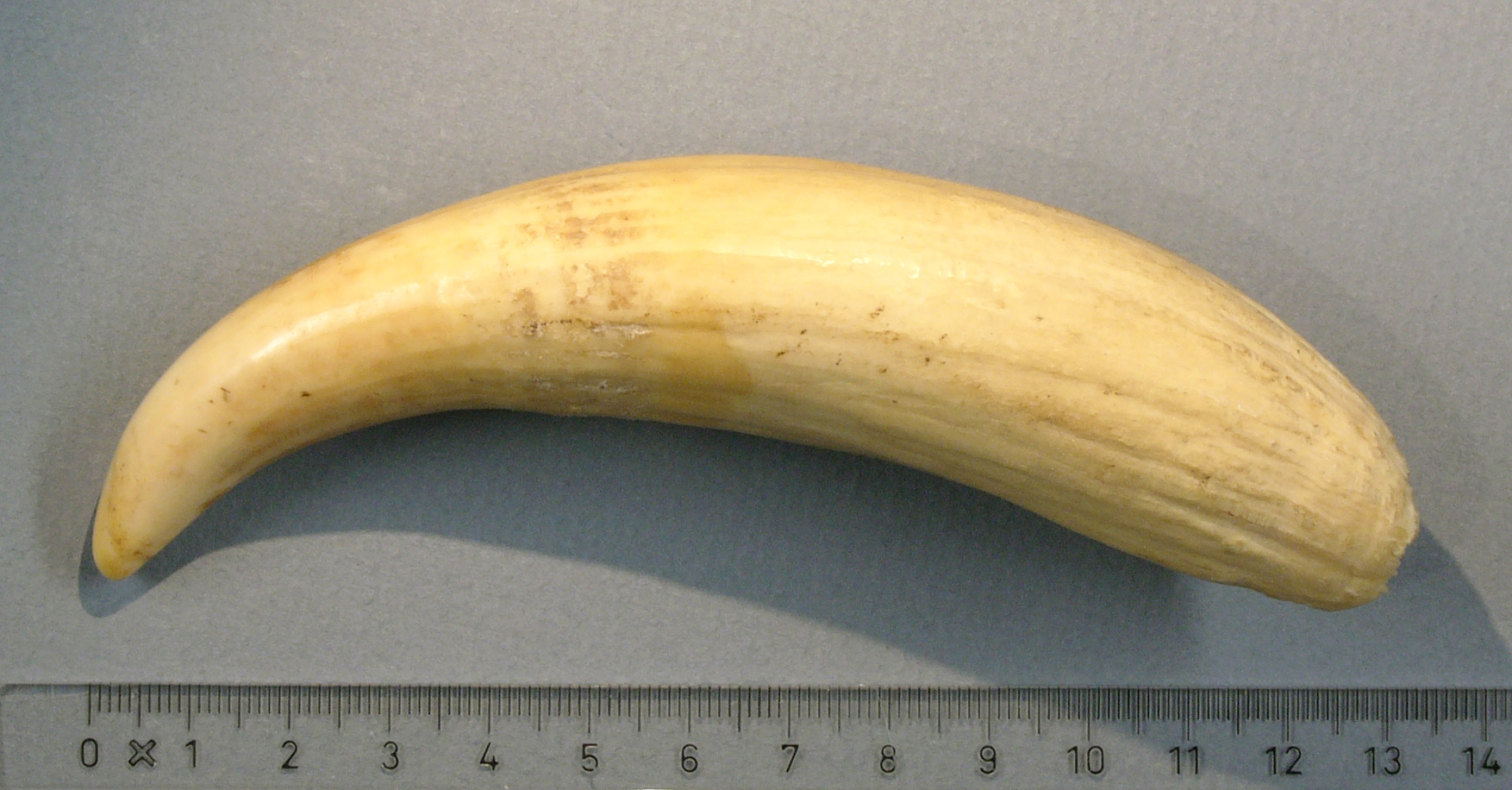
Tooth of a sperm whale

A tabua (Fijian: [tɑmˈbuə]) is a polished tooth of a sperm whale that is an important cultural item in Fijian society. They were traditionally given as gifts for atonement or esteem (called sevusevu), and were important in negotiations between rival chiefs. The dead men would be buried with their tabua, along with war clubs and even their strangled wives, to help them in the afterlife. Originally they were very rare items, available only from beached whales and from trade from neighbouring Tonga (where the practice may have originated), but when the market became known in the early 19th century thousands of teeth, and fake teeth made from ivory and walrus tusks, entered the market. This trade led to the development of the European art of scrimshaw.

Today the tabua remains an important item in Fijian life. They are not sold but traded regularly as gifts in weddings, birthdays, and at funerals. As the tabua aged, contact with the oils in human hands would cause it to darken. The tabua is also increasingly used in advertising as a trusted symbol or brand, for example Fiji Airways has a Tabua Club (frequent flyer) and a Tabua Class for business class. They also feature on the Fijian 20 cent piece.

== Exporting of tabua ==
As tabua are a cultural item and the tooth is sourced from an endangered species, the removal of tabua from Fiji is highly restricted at 225 exports per year. Permits from the Ministry of iTaukei Affairs are required as well as CITES permits. Original CITES permits must be presented to border officials of the importing country or tabua may be seized. In 2007, New Zealand authorities returned 146 tabua to Fijian authorities that had been seized due to having been illegally exported without valid CITES permits.

== Sources ==
- Arno A. (2005). "Cobo and tabua in Fiji: Two forms of cultural currency in an economy of sentiment". American Ethnologist, 32(1): 46 – 62 Abstract
- Clayton, Mark (23 December 2020). "That Tabua". Australian Aeronautical Heritage.
