= Fijian dollar =

Currency of Fiji

Dola ni Viti (Fijian) फिजियन डॉलर (Fiji Hindi)
- A current FJ$5 note

ISO 4217
- Code: FJD (numeric: 242)
- Subunit: 0.01

Units of account
- Symbol: FJ$ or FJD
- Subunit
- 1/100: cent
- Symbol
- cent: c

Denominations
- Banknotes
- Freq. used: $5, $10, $20, $50, $100
- Rarely used: 88c, 100c, $7, $2000
- Coins: 5c, 10c, 20c, 50c, $1, $2

Demographics
- User(s): Fiji

Issuance
- Central bank: Reserve Bank of Fiji
- Website: www.rbf.gov.fj

Valuation
- Inflation: 2.5%
- Source: Reserve Bank of Fiji, Sep 2023 est.

The Fijian dollar (currency sign: FJ$, $; currency code: FJD) has been the currency of Fiji since 1969 and was also the currency between 1867 and 1873. It is normally abbreviated with the dollar sign $, or alternatively FJ$ to distinguish it from other dollar-denominated currencies. It is divided into 100 cents.

== History ==
=== Decimalisation origins ===
Fiji followed the pattern of South Africa, Australia, and New Zealand in that when it adopted the decimal system, it decided to use the half pound unit as opposed to the pound unit of account. The choice of the name dollar was motivated by the fact that the reduced value of the new unit corresponded more closely to the value of the US dollar than it did to the pound sterling.

=== Second dollar (1969–present) ===
The dollar was reintroduced on 15 January 1969, replacing the Fijian pound at a rate of 1 pound = 2 dollars, or 10 shillings = FJ$1. Despite Fiji having been a republic since 1987, coins and banknotes continued to feature Queen Elizabeth II until 2013, when her portrait was replaced with pictures of plants and animals.

== Coinage ==
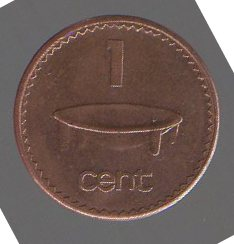

In 1969, coins were introduced in denominations of 1c, 2c, 5c, 10c & 20c, with a 50c coin issued in 1975. The coins had the same sizes and compositions as the corresponding Australian coins, with the 50 cents matching the cupronickel dodecagonal type introduced in Australia in 1969. In 1990, new compositions were introduced, with copper-plated zinc used for the 1¢ and 2¢ coins, and nickel-plated steel for the 5c, 10c, 20c & 50c. An aluminium-bronze $1 coin was introduced in 1995, replacing the $1 note. 2009 saw the introduction of a new smaller coinage from 5 to 50 cents. These were struck by the Royal Canadian Mint and are made with the three-ply electroplate method. The 1 and 2 cents were also discontinued and withdrawn the same year. A thinner brass plated steel $1 coin was later introduced in 2010, gradually phasing out the older type.

In 2013 Fiji released a whole family of new coins, with fauna themes, and without the Queen's portrait. This new series saw the introduction of a $2 coin, replacing the corresponding note just as the $1 coin had done before. This coin faced controversy due to being too easily mistaken as a $1, as it was only slightly larger of the same colour. It was replaced by a larger and thicker Spanish flower shaped $2 coin in 2014. The metallic content of both the $1 and $2 was also changed in 2014 for better durability and resistance to wear after widespread complaints of the coins corroding and "turning black".

Value	Composition	2012 series	
Value	Composition	Obverse	Reverse
5c	three ply nickel-clad steel	Nuqa-roro (Foxface Rabbitfish)	Lali (drum)
10c	three ply nickel-clad steel	Beka-Mirimiri (Fiji Flying Fox)	I ulã tavatava (throwing club)
20c	three ply nickel-clad steel	Kakã (Kadavu Shining Parrot)	Tabua (whale's tooth)
50c	three ply nickel-clad steel	Varivoce (Humphead Wrasse)	Camakau (traditional outrigger canoe)
$1	three ply nickel-clad brass	Vokai (Banded Iguana)	Saqãmoli (drinking vessel)
$2	three ply nickel-clad brass	Ga ni Vatu (Peregrine Falcon)	Tanoa (kava bowl)

== Banknotes ==
=== First dollar ===
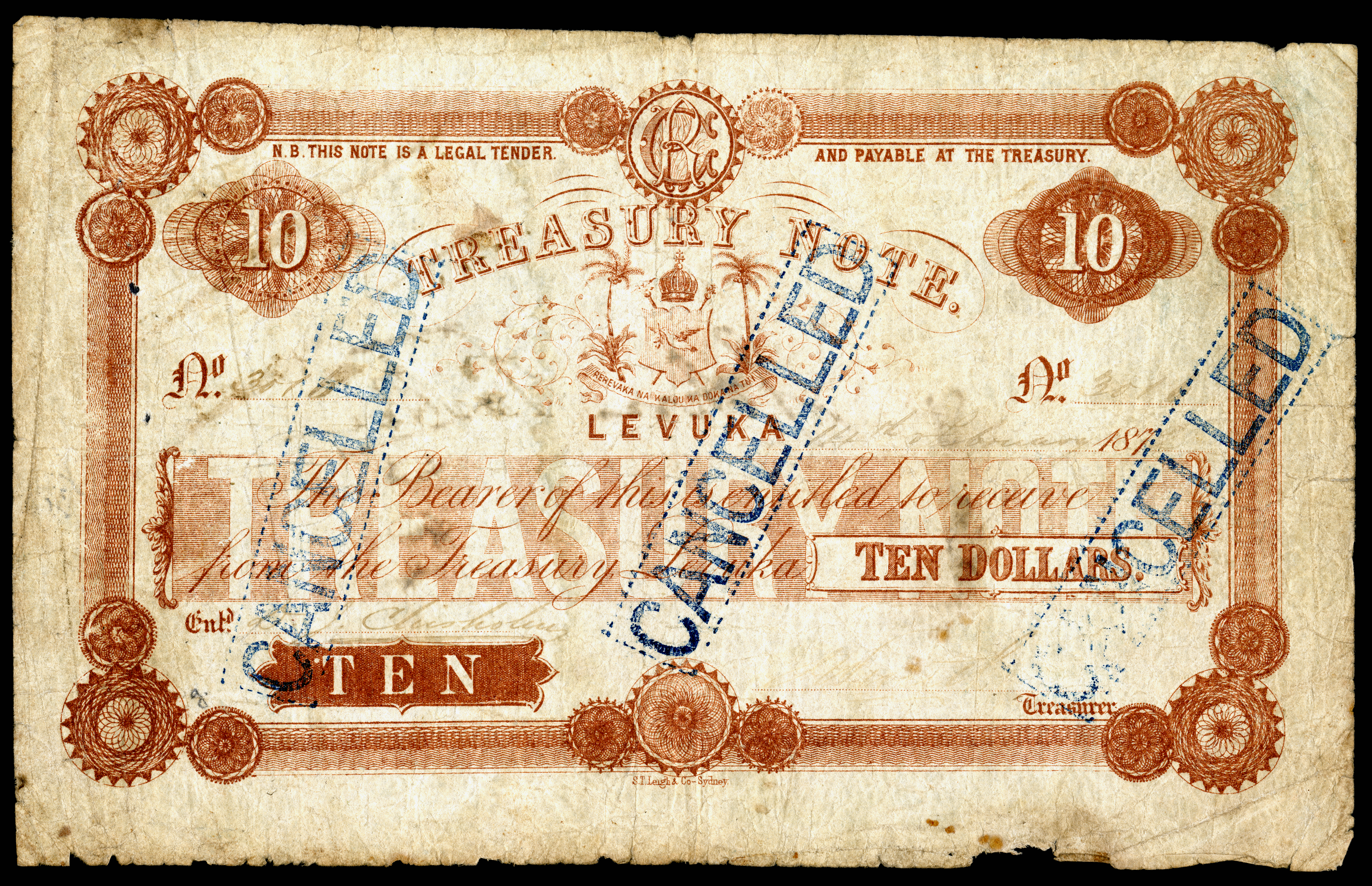
Series 1872 Treasury Note for 10 dollars payable at Levuka

In 1867, the government treasury issued 1 dollar notes. These were followed by notes for $1, $5, $10, $25 and $50 issued between 1871 and 1873. Also between 1871 and 1873, King Seru Epenisa Cakobau issued notes in denominations of 12 1/2¢, 25¢, 50¢, 100¢ and $5. Levuka (on Ovalau island) issued $1 and $5 notes during the 1870s.

=== Second dollar ===
Commemorative two-dollar banknote for 2000

On 15 January 1969, the government introduced notes in denominations of 50 cents, $1, $2, $10, and $20; the $5 note was not issued until 1970. The Central Monetary Authority took over the issuance of paper money in 1974, issuing the same denominations, although the 50c note was replaced by a coin on 3 March 1975. In 1986, the Reserve Bank of Fiji began issuing notes. The $1 note was replaced by a coin in 1995. The $50 note was introduced in 1996, followed by a $100 note on 10 April 2007. Banknote denominations in circulation as of 2017 are: $5, $10, $20, $50 and $100.

=== 2007 Series ===
2007 Series
Image	Value	Dimensions	Main colour	Description		Date of issue	Date of first issue	Watermark
Image	Value	Dimensions	Main colour	Obverse	Reverse	Date of issue	Date of first issue	Watermark
	$2	131 × 67 mm	Green	Mohar (sovereign locket); domodomo (canoe masthead) as registration device; Queen Elizabeth II; Fijian coat of arms	Children, National Stadium in Suva, Korobas mountains	2007	10 April 2007	Fijian head and electrotype 2
	$5	136 × 67 mm	Brown	Katoni Masima; domodomo (canoe masthead) as registration device; Queen Elizabeth II; Fijian coat of arms	Mount Valili, Fiji Crested Iguana, Balaka palm, Masiratu flower	2007	10 April 2007	Fijian head and electrotype 5
	$10	141 × 67 mm	Purple	i Buburau ni Bete; domodomo (canoe masthead) as registration device; Queen Elizabeth II; Fijian coat of arms	Joske's Thumb; Grand Pacific Hotel	2007	10 April 2007	Fijian head and electrotype 10
	$20	146 × 67 mm	Blue	Foa; domodomo (canoe masthead) as registration device; Queen Elizabeth II; Fijian coat of arms	Fish processing; cutting lumber; mining; train; Mount Uluinabukelevu	2007	10 April 2007	Fijian head and electrotype 20
	$50	151 × 67 mm	Red	Wasekaseka; domodomo (canoe masthead) as registration device; Queen Elizabeth II; Fijian coat of arms	Ceremonial presentation of Tabua and Yaqona	2007	10 April 2007	Fijian head and electrotype 50
	$100	156 × 67 mm	Yellow	Buli Kula; domodomo (canoe masthead) as registration device; Queen Elizabeth II; Fijian coat of arms.	Map of Fiji; Tourism	2007	10 April 2007	Fijian head and electrotype 100

=== 2012 Series ===
2012 Series
Image	Value	Dimensions	Main colour	Description		Date of issue	Date of first issue	Watermark
Image	Value	Dimensions	Main colour	Obverse	Reverse	Date of issue	Date of first issue	Watermark
	$5	136 × 67 mm	Green	Katoni Masima; domodomo (canoe masthead) as registration device; Red-throated lorikeet; Fijian coat of arms	Mount Valili, Fiji Crested Iguana, Balaka palm, Masiratu flower	2012	2 January 2013	Fijian head and electrotype 5
	$10	141 × 67 mm	Purple	i Buburau ni Bete; domodomo (canoe masthead) as registration device; Beli fish; Fijian coat of arms	Joske's Thumb; Grand Pacific Hotel	2012	2 January 2013	Fijian head and electrotype 10
	$20	146 × 67 mm	Blue	Foa; domodomo (canoe masthead) as registration device; MacGillivray's petrel; Fijian coat of arms	Fish processing; cutting lumber; mining; train; Mount Uluinabukelevu	2012	2 January 2013	Fijian head and electrotype 20
	$50	151 × 67 mm	Red	Wasekaseka; domodomo (canoe masthead) as registration device; Tagimoucia flower; Fijian coat of arms	Ceremonial presentation of Tabua and Yaqona	2012	2 January 2013	Fijian head and electrotype 50
	$100	156 × 67 mm	Yellow	Buli Kula; domodomo (canoe masthead) as registration device; Nanai (Fiji cicada); Fijian coat of arms.	Map of Fiji; Tourism	2012	2 January 2013	Fijian head and electrotype 100

== Commemorative banknotes ==
- 2000 2 Dollars – Millennium
- 2000 2,000 Dollars – Millennium
- 2017 7 Dollars – Victory of the Fijian rugby sevens team at the 2016 Summer Olympics in Rio de Janeiro.
- 2020 50 Dollars – Fiji's 50th Independence Anniversary.
- 2022 7 Dollars - Fijian Rugby 7s. at the Olympic Games in Tokyo, Japan
- 2022 88 Cents - Chinese God of Wealth
- 2023 100 Cents - Lunar New Year and the Year of the Dragon

== Current status and value ==
On 16 August 2005, Finance Minister Ratu Jone Kubuabola announced that the Cabinet had approved the introduction of a $100 banknote and the withdrawal of the 1 and 2 cent coin, as the minting cost exceeded its face value. Kubuabola said that the $100 banknote would measure 156 × 67 mm, with the other banknotes receding at 5 mm towards the lowest banknote denomination. The portrait of Queen Elizabeth II would remain on all banknotes, he added, obviously in answer to calls from some politicians to remove the Queen's portrait from the currency after 18 years as a republic. Fiji is, however, a member of the Commonwealth, and Queen Elizabeth was recognized as Paramount Chief of the Great Council of Chiefs of Fiji until her death on 8 September 2022. Her portrait was updated to a more mature one, which was released in 2007, becoming the fourth portrait of the Queen to appear on Fijian currency.

In 2009, the demonetization of the 1 and 2 cent coins was made official and a new coin set of 5, 10, 20, and 50 cent coins with reduced size were introduced. The old coins based on the Australian size standard were withdrawn from circulation. The reformed coins were introduced to save on production costs. The new 50 cent piece is also round with reeded edges rather than twelve-sided. On 2 March 2011, it was announced that Fiji would drop Queen Elizabeth II's portrait from its coins and notes, instead opting for local flora and fauna. The removal was seen as retaliation for Fiji's suspension from its full membership of the Commonwealth. The new set, which was unveiled on 12 December 2012, was issued on 2 January 2013. The new series of Fijian coins include a brass-plated steel $2 coin intended to replace the note, and a thinner, reduced weight $1 coin. The new series of Fijian dollar banknotes feature Fijian flora and fauna to replace the portrait of Queen Elizabeth II. One change in the redesign of the Fijian dollar banknotes was the $5 note. Originally printed on paper, it is now issued as a polymer banknote.

Polymer plastic-coated notes were introduced in 2007, featuring images of local people, culture, trade and industry. Their sizes vary among denominations.

A new series of notes, the "Flora and Fauna" design series, was introduced in 2013, featuring endemic flora and fauna. The image of Queen Elizabeth II no longer features in the new banknote series. The $2 note, now coined, ceased to be legal tender on 31 March 2013 and the $5 note is now printed in green, a change from its previous tawny and brown colour scheme. The new $5 note, the first banknote from the "Flora and Fauna" design series, entered into circulation on 2 April 2013.

Current FJD exchange rates
From Google Finance:	AUD CAD CHF CNY EUR GBP HKD JPY USD SGD NZD EUR
From Yahoo! Finance:	AUD CAD CHF CNY EUR GBP HKD JPY USD SGD NZD EUR
From XE.com:	AUD CAD CHF CNY EUR GBP HKD JPY USD SGD NZD EUR
From OANDA:	AUD CAD CHF CNY EUR GBP HKD JPY USD SGD NZD EUR

== See also ==
- Economy of Fiji
- Australian dollar
- New Zealand dollar
- Solomon Islands dollar
