= Joske's Thumb =

Volcanic plug near Suva, Fiji

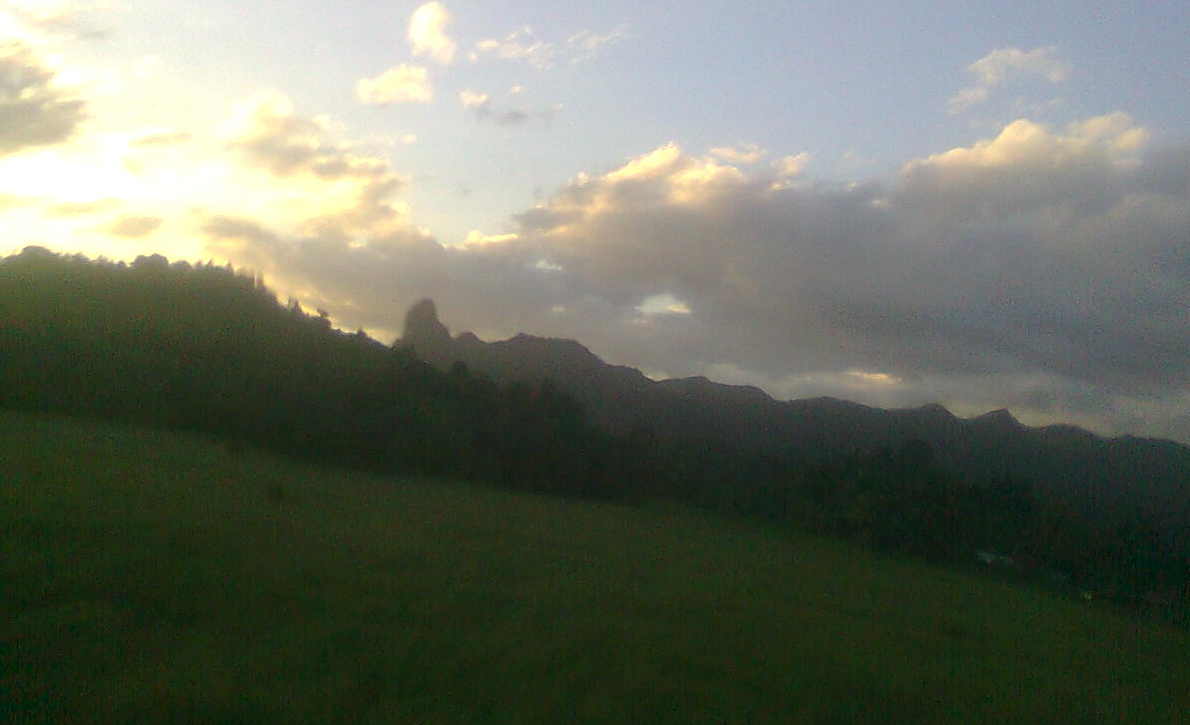
- Panorama showing Joske's Thumb: June 2013

Highest point
- Elevation: 1,450 ft (440 m)
- Coordinates: 18°5′17.84″S 178°18′10.04″E

Geography
- Location within Fiji

Joske's Thumb is a precipitous volcanic plug that rises in the skyline to the west of Suva, Fiji. It is located 15 kilometers west of Suva and its base is accessible from Naikorokoro Road, which connects Naikorokoro Village to Queens Road. Other sources note that Naikorokoro Road, the road toward Joske's Thumb, intersects on the north side of Queens Road, 0.8 kilometres (0.50 miles) west of the Lami Bay Hotel outside Lami.

Sir Edmund Hillary, the mountaineer made famous for being the first climber (with his Sherpa guide Tenzing Norgay) confirmed as having reached the summit of Mount Everest in Nepal, was defeated in his first attempts to reach the peak of Fiji's Joske's Thumb. Sir Hillary was conscripted into the Royal New Zealand Air Force during World War II. He served as a navigator aboard Catalina flying boats in New Zealand's No. 5 Squadron based at the flying boat base in the Suva Point neighborhood, currently the location of the University of the South Pacific's Lower Campus. He made two attempts to climb Joske's Thumb, the first of which ended before reaching the base of the mountain, due to heavy undergrowth. In his autobiography, Sir Hillary wrote about his second attempt to climb Joske's Thumb while stationed in Suva: "We had come up the wrong side — underneath the ball of The Thumb.... Bitterly disappointed at being rebuffed I was much too conscious of the 400-foot (120-metre) drop below me to take any more risks — and I hadn't much confidence in our length of clothes line. The Thumb had beaten us again." In 1983, 30 years after his successful Everest expedition, he reached the summit of Joske's Thumb along with several members of the Fiji Rucksack Club.

The peak takes its name from Paul Joske, one of Suva's pioneer settlers, who came with the Australian-based Polynesia Company in 1870. Joske and his son, Adolf Brewster-Joske, later known as Adolf Brewster Brewster, established Fiji's first sugar mill, importing machinery and beginning the country's sugar industry. The mill, which operated between 1873 and 1875, was on the site where Fiji's Parliament Building currently stands. The mill ultimately failed, owing to the poor crop from shallow soil in the Suva area. Later in life, Paul Joske devoted much of his time to designing and establishing Suva as Fiji's new capital.

Prior to Paul Joske's arrival in Fiji, the mountain was known as "Rama" and Devil's Thumb, because "the locals say looks like a man trying to claw his way out of hell." When Paul Joske committed suicide after allegations of incest, his descendants changed their names to Brewster, Joske's wife's maiden name, but the Devil's Thumb was commemorated with Joske's name, due to his demise.

Today, the mountain and the area around Joske's Thumb are known as a habitat for many species of birds. Among the species that live near Joske's Thumb are many birds that are endemic to Fiji, including the masked shining parrot, the giant forest honeyeater, and the pink-billed parrotfinch, although parrotfinch sightings have declined significantly since the area was logged in the early 1980s. Joske's Thumb is also a historical nesting site for Falco peregrinus nesiotes, Fiji's endemic peregrine falcon.

Along with the Grand Pacific Hotel in Suva, Joske's Thumb is featured on the reverse side of the 2007 and 2012 series of Fiji's ten dollar bill.
