= Thomas John McMahon =

Australian photojournalist and author

- Born: 1864
- Died: 1933 (aged 68–69)

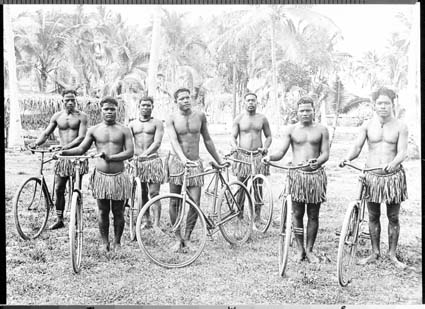
Photograph depicting Nauruan taken by TJ Mc Mahon around 1916-17.

Thomas John McMahon FRGS (1864 – 1933) was an Australian photojournalist and writer. From 1915 to 1922 he made several trips to Melanesia and Micronesia.

His photographic reports depicting the Pacific Islanders gained a widespread audience. Thousands were published worldwide in newspapers, magazines, books, serial encyclopedias and postcards. McMahon contributed to create a popular and visual knowledge of the Pacific. His work answered a demand in Australia, and the Western World, for visual information on the life in the Pacific Islands, the local's physical appearance and customs and whether economic opportunities existed for settlers or investors.

== Biography ==
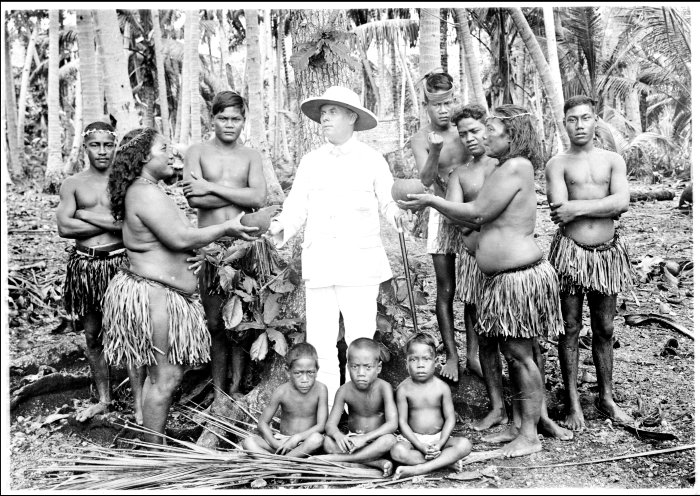
Depiction of a missionary with natives in Nauru.

Thomas McMahon, born in 1864, made a first trip to New Guinea in 1915, he then toured the Pacific till 1922 in order to advocate Australian colonialism, tourism and economic development in the area. He journeyed Nauru, Banaba, the Gilbert islands, the Marshall islands, the Solomon Islands, the New Hebrides, Fiji and the Torres strait Islands.

After a reporting on Fiji published in The Sydney Mail in late 1921 and early 1922, he traveled to Asia in August 1922. He published a book about the experience and became a rural reporter and photographer for Brisbane's Courier Mail. He died in 1933.

== Works ==
- "Germany in the Pacific". Munsey's magazine. December 1918. pp. 481–496.
- "The German menace in the Pacific : the position now existing in German New Guinea". World's Work Magazine: [479]–489. December 1918.
- The Orient I found. New York: D. Appleton & Co. 1926.

== Bibliography ==
- Cochrane, Susan; Quanchi, Max (10 November 2014). "a collector of images; the Pacific archive of photographer Thomas McMahon". Hunting the Collectors: Pacific Collections in Australian Museums, Art Galleries and Archives. Cambridge Scholars Publishing. ISBN 978-1-4438-7100-6.
- Quanchi, Max (March 1997). "Thomas McMahon: Photography as propaganda in the Pacific Islands". History of Photography. 21 (1): 42–53. doi:10.1080/03087298.1997.10443716. ISSN 0308-7298.
