= Fijian pound =

Currency of Fiji between 1873 and 1969

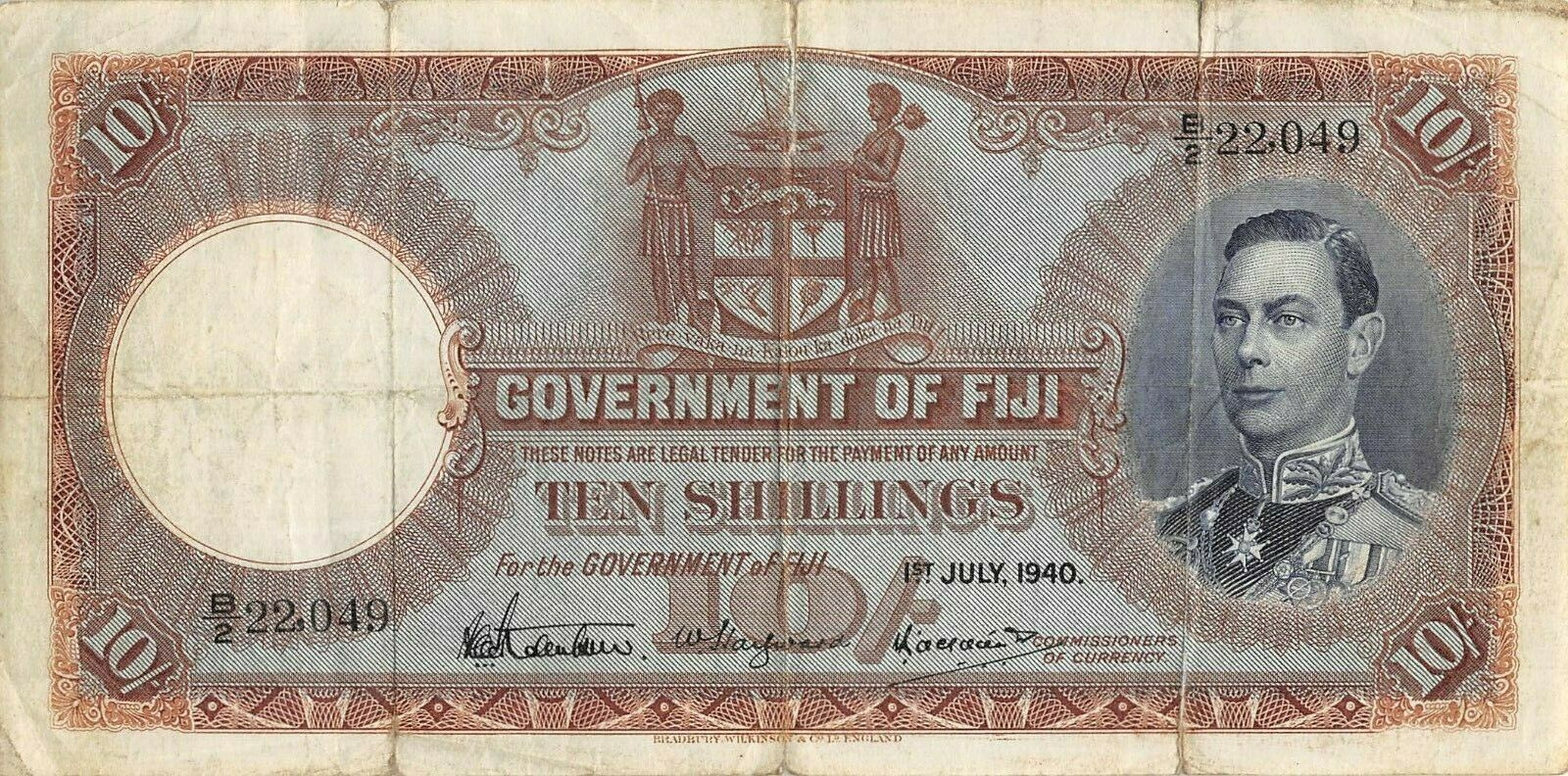

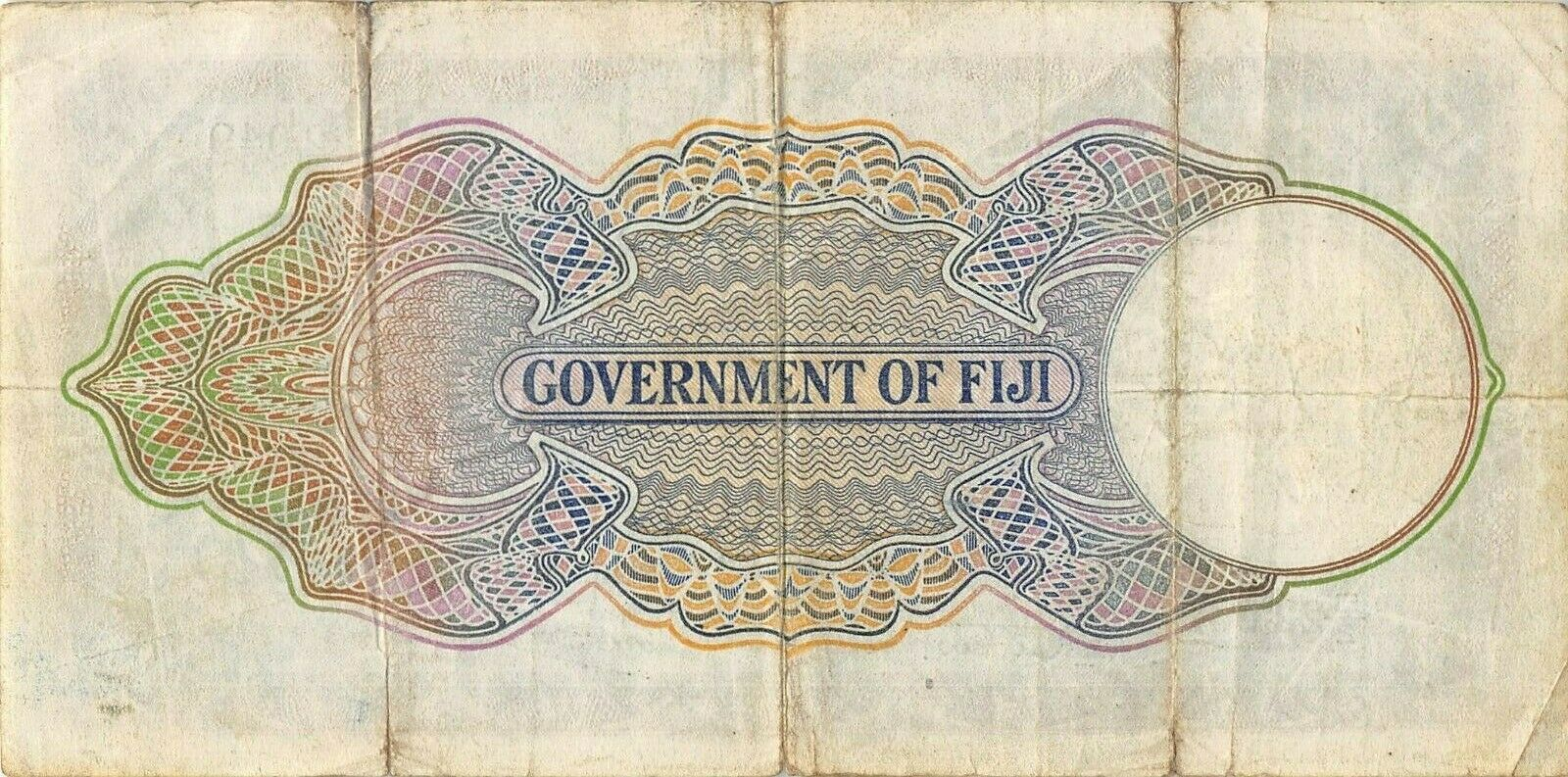

Units of account
- Symbol: £
- Subunit
- 1/20: shilling
- 1/240: penny
- Symbol
- shilling: s or /–
- penny: d

Denominations
- Banknotes
- Freq. used: 5/–, 10/–, £1, £5, £10, £20
- Rarely used: 1d, 1/–, 2/–
- Coins: 1/2d, 1d, 3d, 6d, 1/–, 2/–

Demographics
- User(s): Fiji

Issuance
- Central bank: Board of Commissioners of Currency of Fiji (1914-1973); Central Monetary Authority of Fiji (1973-1983); Reserve Bank of Fiji (1984-)
- Website: www.reservebank.gov.fj
- This infobox shows the latest status before this currency was rendered obsolete.

The pound (sign: £) was the currency of Fiji between 1873 and 1969. It was subdivided into 20 shillings, each of 12 pence.

== History ==
From its earliest days as a British colony, sterling coinage circulated in Fiji, supplemented by locally produced paper money. During the Great Depression of the 1930s, the Australian and New Zealand banks devalued their currencies in order to bolster exports to the UK. These banks also controlled the exchange rate for Fiji, and in 1933 the Fiji pound was devalued to £1/2/3 Fijian = £1 stg, in order to bring it into line with the devalued New Zealand pound, even though the New Zealand pound would very shortly devalue further to bring it into line with the Australian pound. In 1934, as a result of the break in parity with sterling, Fiji began to issue its own coins. When sterling was devalued on 20 November 1967, Fiji immediately followed suit. However, over the next week, Fiji considered the adverse effects that this devaluation would have on imports to Fiji while keeping an eye on how Australia and New Zealand would respond to the situation. On 28 November 1967, Fiji decided to partially revalue its pound, hence resulting in a sterling exchange rate of £104/10/– Fijian = £100 stg. This had the effect of bringing the Fijian pound closer to its original relationship to the Australian and New Zealand units as existed prior to the upheavals which took place in the exchange rates at the time of the Great Depression. In 1969, the Fijian pound was replaced by the Fijian dollar at a rate of £1 = FJ$2 such that the new Fijian dollar was approximately equal to the new dollars in Australia and New Zealand.

For a more general view of history in the wider region, see British currency in Oceania.

== Coins ==
In 1934, coins were introduced in denominations of 1/2d, 1d and 6d, 1/– and 2/–. A notable absence from this list is the 3d denomination which existed in all other territories which used sterling coinage. The absence of a 3d coin was a matter of considerable controversy. The larger denomination Fijian coins were the same size as the corresponding British coins, whereas the 1/2d and 1d were smaller, holed, and struck in cupro-nickel. In 1942 and 1943, coins were produced for Fiji at the San Francisco Mint, resulting in brass 1/2d and 1d coins and 90% silver 6d, 1/– and 2/– coins. In 1947, a nickel-brass dodecagonal 3d coin of identical size and shape to the corresponding Sterling coin was finally introduced. Cupro-nickel replaced silver between 1953 and 1957.

== Banknotes ==
In 1871, £1 notes were issued at Levuka on the island of Ovalau. These were followed in 1873 by notes of the Fiji Banking and Commercial Company in denominations of 5/– and 10/– and £1 and £5. The Bank of New Zealand introduced notes in 1876 in denominations of £1, £5, £10 and £20, followed by 10/– notes in 1918. Bank of New South Wales issued £1 notes in 1901.

In 1914, the Fijian government Currency Board introduced its own banknotes: £1, £5, £10 and £20 denominations which were printed by Thomas de la Rue in London. Due to wartime conditions creating a shortage of silver, 10/- notes were introduced in 1918, followed by 5/– in 1920. All notes of this first issue have a guilloche and scrollwork design, while lacking a vignette. Also in 1920, the private trading banknotes of the Bank of New Zealand and Bank of New South Wales were withdrawn from circulation. A new design second issue of all denominations featuring the portrait of King George V were introduced in 1934. Apart from revised portraits of the reigning monarch, these notes were largely the same design until 1969. Emergency issues were also made during World War II for 1d, 1/– and 2/–.
