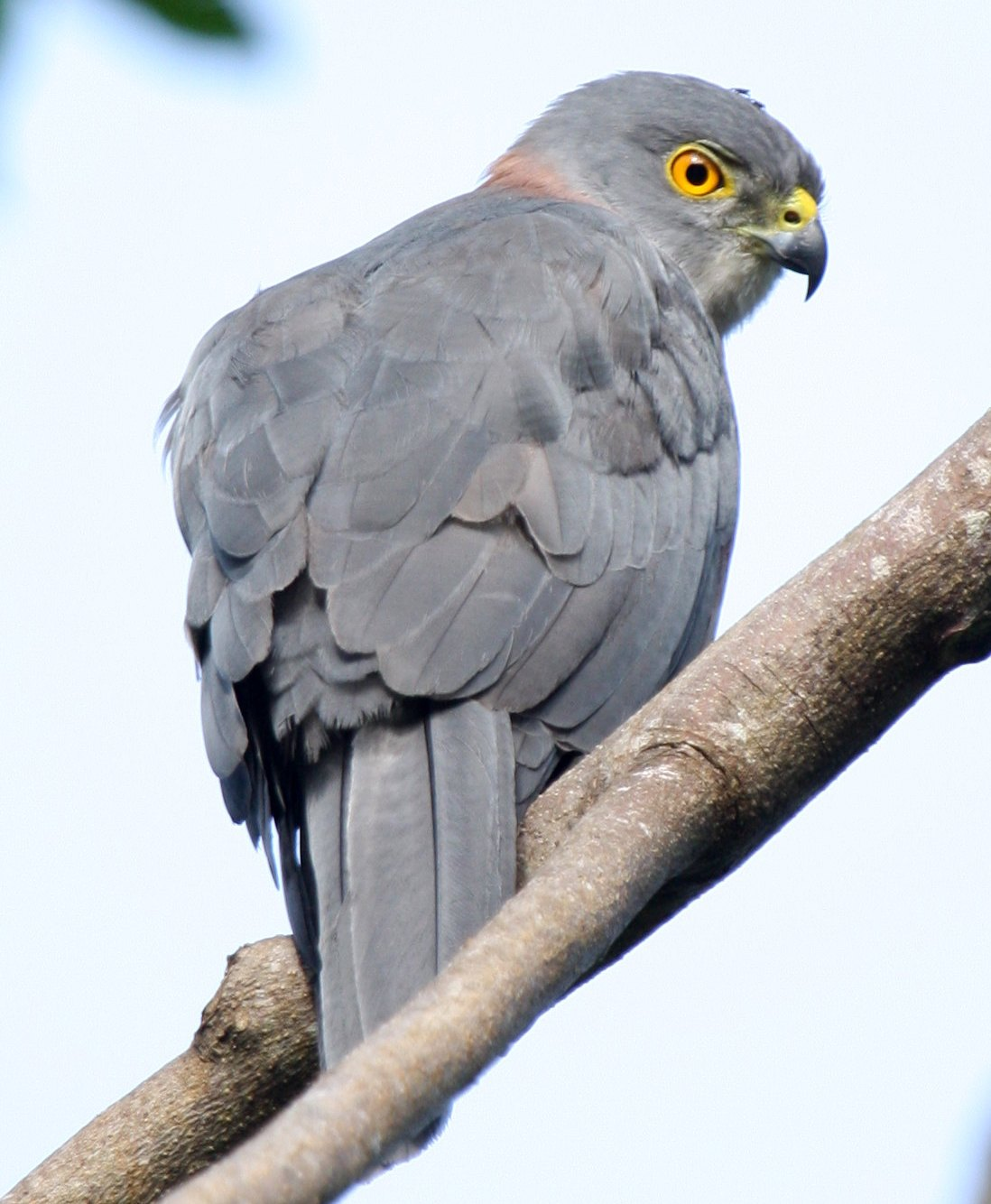
- Savusavu, Vanua Levu
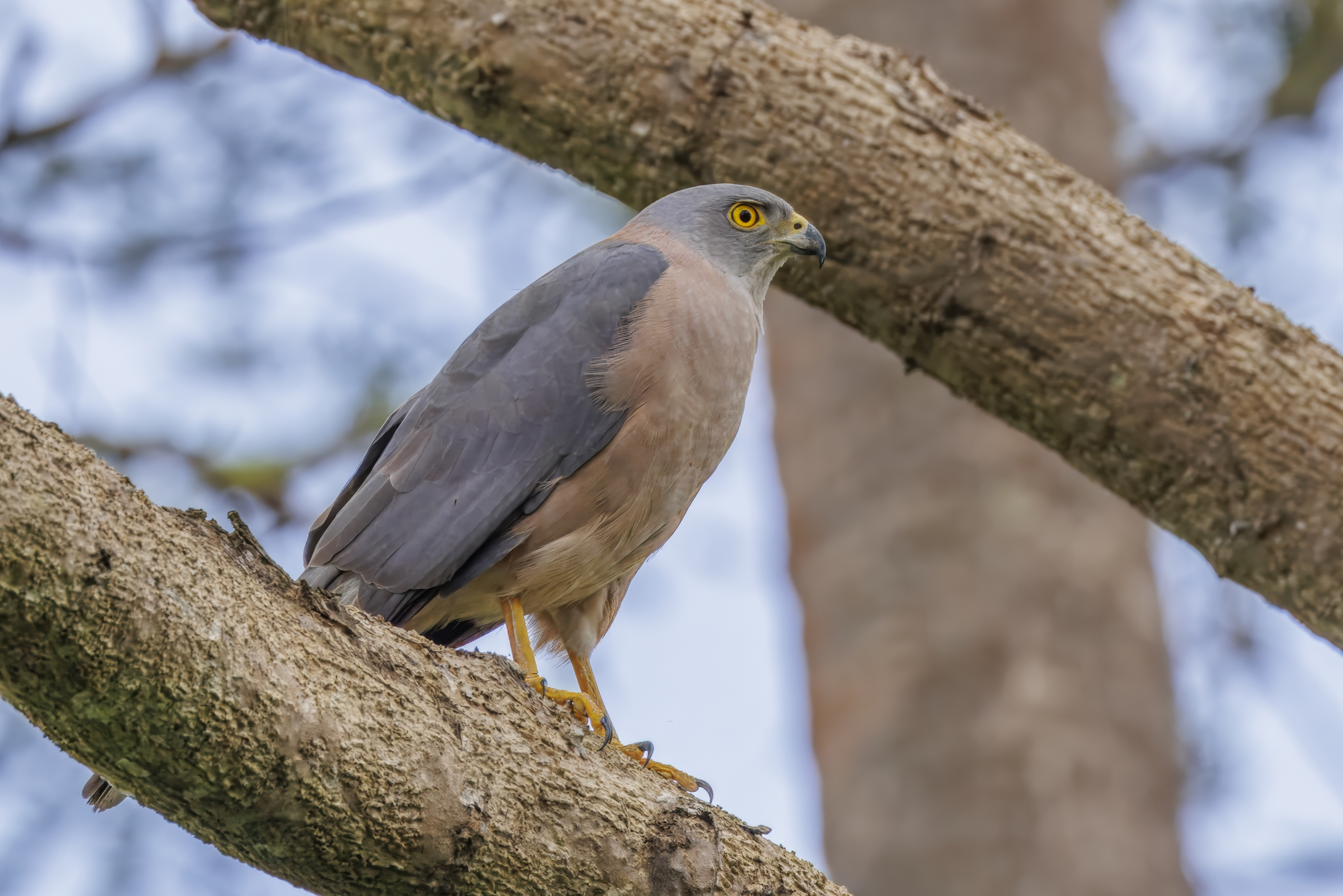
- Young adult, Taveuni

Conservation status
- Least Concern (IUCN 3.1)

Scientific classification
- Kingdom: Animalia
- Phylum: Chordata
- Class: Aves
- Order: Accipitriformes
- Family: Accipitridae
- Genus: Tachyspiza
- Species: T. rufitorques

Binomial name
- Tachyspiza rufitorques (Peale, 1849)
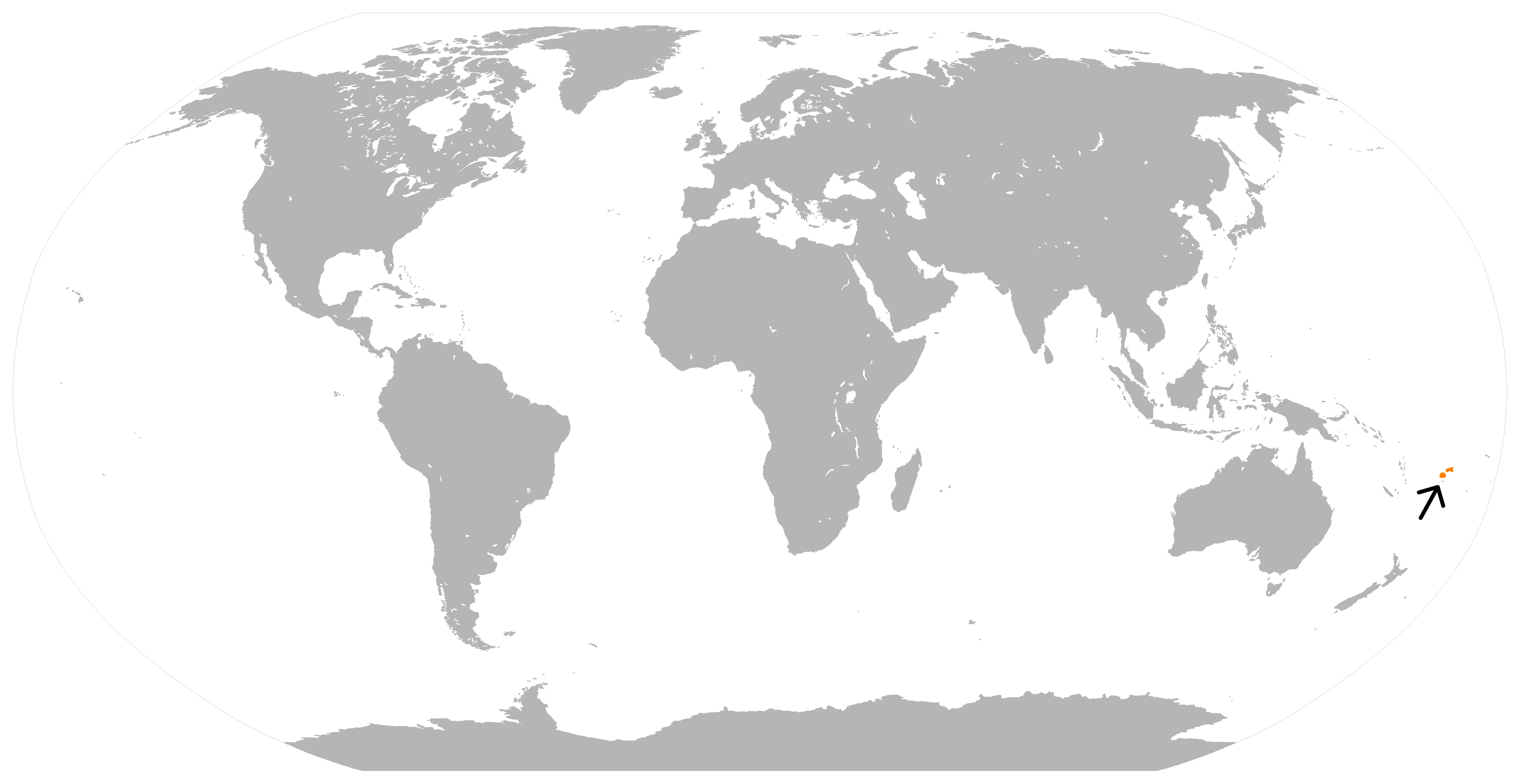

= Fiji goshawk =

Species of bird

The Fiji goshawk (Tachyspiza rufitorques) is a species of bird of prey in the family Accipitridae. It was once considered to be the same species (conspecific) as the brown goshawk of Australia and New Caledonia. It is endemic to Fiji, where it occurs on the larger islands of Viti Levu, Vanua Levu, Taveuni, Kadavu, Gau and Ovalau. It occupies a range of wooded habitats in Fiji, from natural rainforest to coconut plantations and urban gardens and parks.

== Description ==
The Fiji goshawk ranges in size from 30–40 cm, making it medium-sized for its genus. It exhibits sexual dimorphism, with the females being larger than the males. It has long legs and a long tail. The plumage is unmistakable within its range, having a grey head, back, tail and wings and dull pink undersides and collar. The plumage of the juvenile is distinct from the adult, being all over brown with a highly streaked breast.

== Diet ==
The Fiji goshawk feeds on birds as large as pigeons, insects, introduced rodents and reptiles. and have also been recorded feeding on freshwater prawns from the family Palaemonidae, as well as freshwater fish. This species hunts both from perches or flying. Prey may be snatched with either a slow and stealthy glide or a quick flapping attack. Prey may be chased into cover and they will actively harass and attempt to flush concealed prey.

== Breeding ==
Fiji goshawks are seasonal breeders, with the breeding season occurring between July and December. Most eggs are laid between September and October. The nest is a platform of sticks located high in a lightly vegetated tree. The typical clutch size is two to three eggs (occasionally four), of which up to two chicks are commonly fledged.

== History ==
Although the species is today considered to be endemic to Fiji, fossil bones attributed to this species have been found on the island of 'Eua in Tonga. The species may once have occurred in the Lau group of Fiji as well. Fiji goshawks will occasionally take chickens and are often shot. They are nevertheless common and live at high densities.
