= Blossom expedition =

1923–26 ornithological expedition

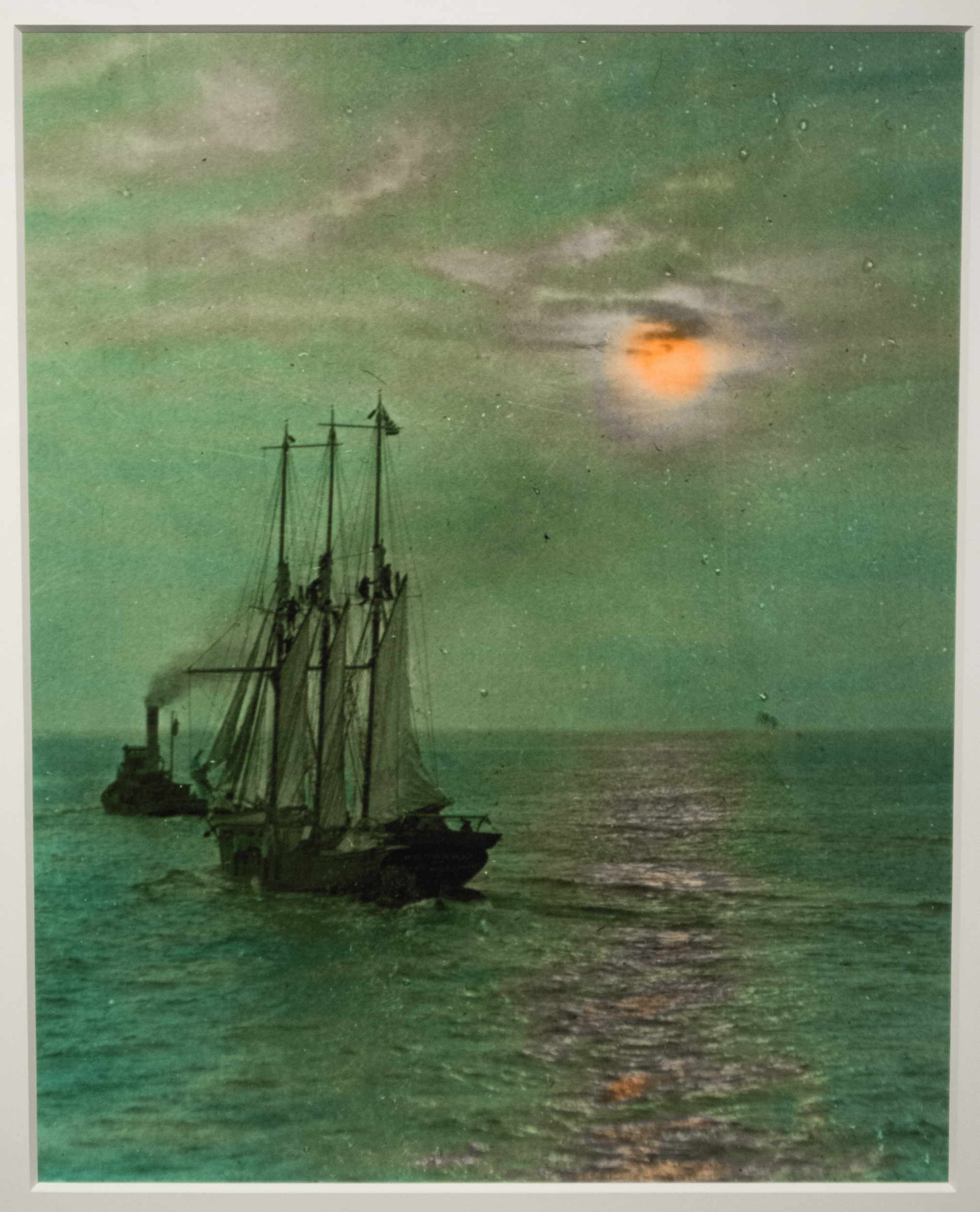
The expedition's schooner, the Blossom, was named after its benefactor Elizabeth Blossom.

The Blossom expedition (Note: In a 1922 publication, the Cleveland Museum of Natural History refers to the expedition as the South Atlantic and Indian Ocean Expedition and as the South Atlantic Expedition.) was a collecting expedition that principally procured ornithological specimens from Africa, South America, and islands in the South Atlantic Ocean for the collections of the Cleveland Museum of Natural History in Cleveland, Ohio. The expedition was initiated by Leonard Sanford, with museum trustee Elizabeth Blossom serving as its eponymous benefactor.

The expedition took place from 1923 to 1926, with a scientific crew led by ornithologist George Finlay Simmons. Their ship, the Blossom, was initially captained by Emery Gray, though he left later in the expedition. They ultimately brought thirteen thousand natural history specimens and thousands of photographs to the United States, despite challenges brought about by the physical limits of their ship, personnel changes, and severe weather.

== Conception ==
Leonard Cutler Sanford, a surgeon and patron of ornithology, proposed collecting bird specimens from across the world to be shared by museums and brought the idea before Cleveland Museum of Natural History director Paul M. Rea in 1922. In the spring of 1923, trustees of the museum announced a two-year expedition with the purpose of bringing back ornithological specimens, and other larger specimens, from islands in the South Atlantic Ocean. At the time, the American Museum of Natural History had initiated the Whitney South Sea Expedition, and the two museums planned to exchange material to enhance both collections. Elizabeth Bingham Blossom, a trustee of the Cleveland museum, was to finance the museum's expedition.

== Ship and crew ==
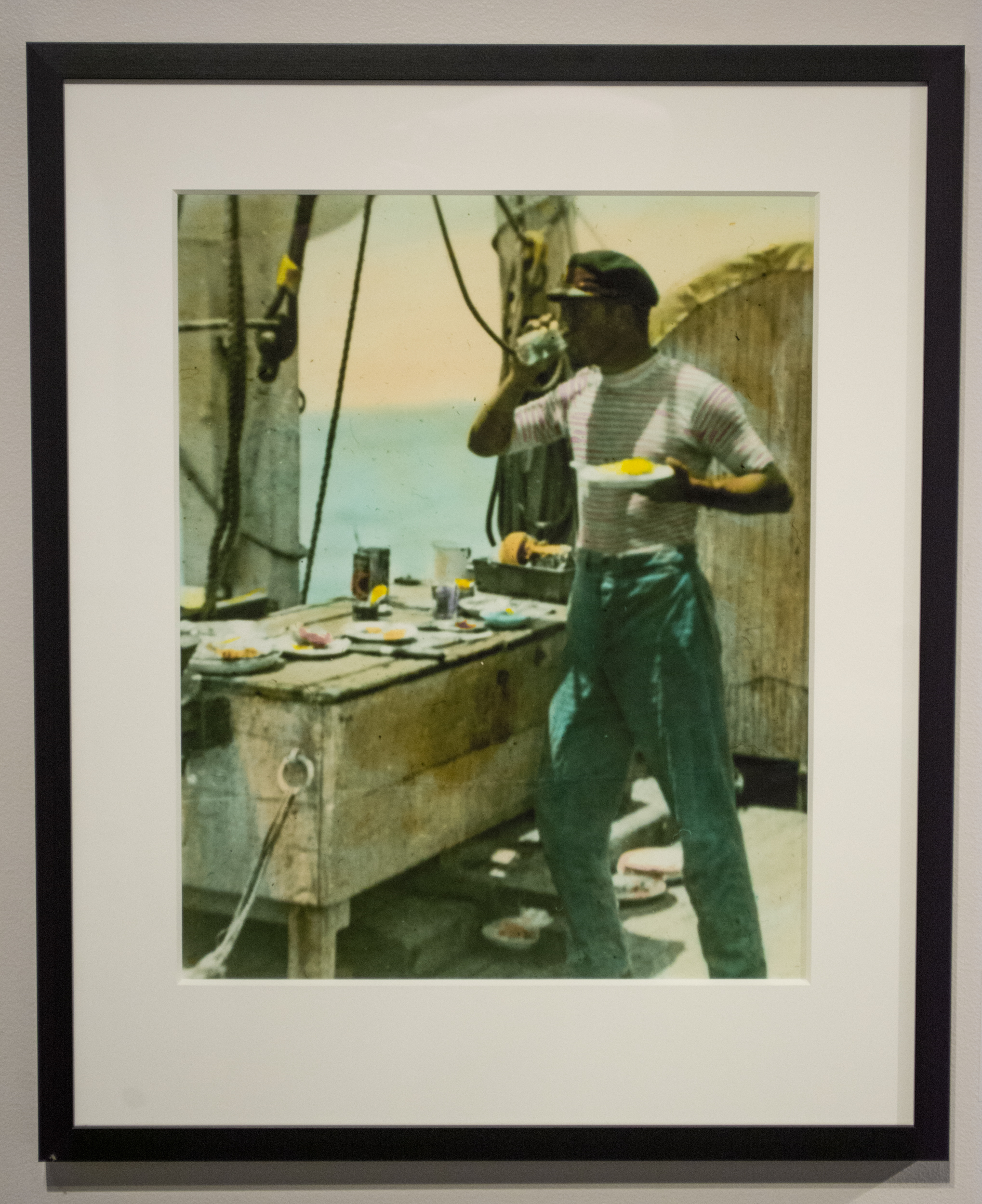
Expedition leader George Finlay Simmons on the deck of the Blossom

Rea and the museum trustees selected George Finlay Simmons, an ornithologist and future president of the University of Montana, as the leader of the expedition. The scientific crew consisted of taxidermist Robert H. Rockwell, biologist Kenneth Cuyler, and field naturalist Allan Moses. The museum ran a newspaper advertisement seeking a ship captain that was "Inclined to Piracy", which ultimately led to the selection of Emery Gray. Manuel Tomas Chantre, a former member of the United States Navy, served as the ship's navigator. John da Lomba, a Cape Verde native, assisted with sailing. They also brought along Carl T. Robertson, an associate editor from The Plain Dealer who was to chronicle the expedition, as well as a group of college-aged men.

The expedition's ship, a schooner, was built in 1920. When she was purchased by the museum, her name was changed from the Lucy R to the Blossom, after Elizabeth Blossom. She was completely revamped with equipment necessary for a long expedition, including new sails and a motor for raising the anchor, and contained a cabin for living space, a darkroom, a room for drying specimens, and a radio room. Held in storage were "approximately one-and-one-half tons of food for each man" as well as coffee, tea, cocoa, and barrels containing 4,500 US gallons (17,000 litres) of water.

== Expedition ==
=== Journey to Cape Verde ===
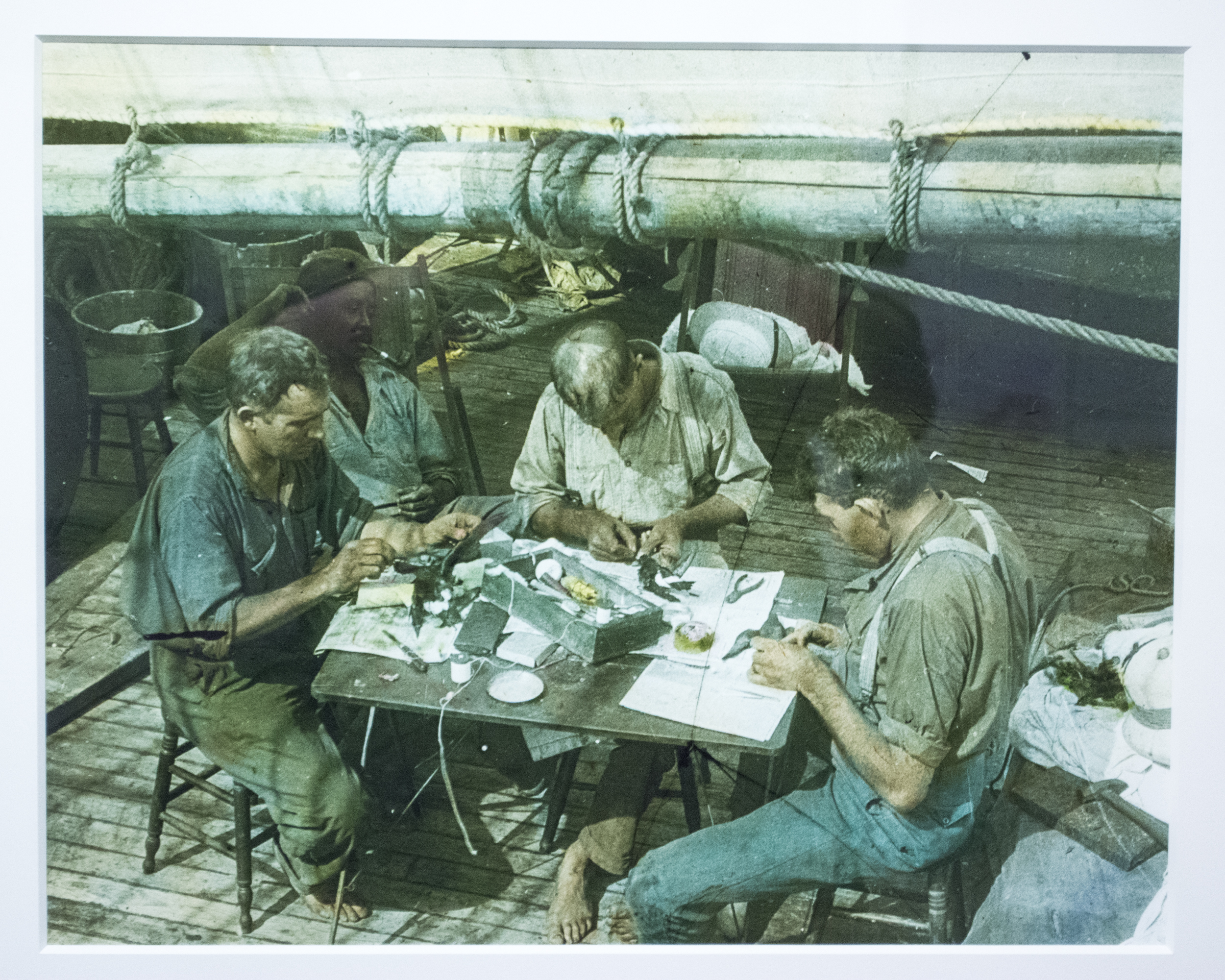
Expedition members preparing specimens aboard the Blossom in 1924

The Blossom began its journey from New London, Connecticut, on October 29, 1923. The expedition then stopped at Gardiner's Bay, Long Island, to perform work on the ship, and left on November 10. Eight days later, they were met with severe storms that lasted for two weeks. Flooding caused several issues on the ship, such as damage to equipment, spoilage of food supplies, and contamination of barrels holding fresh drinking water due to their improper sealing. The Blossom reached Cape Verde, in West Africa, on December 10, where they began collecting specimens. 200 miles (320 kilometres) off course, the expedition was reported lost back home.

By the time the expedition reached São Vicente, Cape Verde, the Blossom had been heavily damaged. They spent a month there while the ship was repaired and continued collecting specimens. Meanwhile, Rockwell and da Lomba separately went to Brava, Cape Verde, where they planned to collect specimens for ten days. The men were left stranded at Brava for three months, as Simmons decided to explore the rest of the Cape Verde archipelago before recovering them.

=== Continental Africa ===
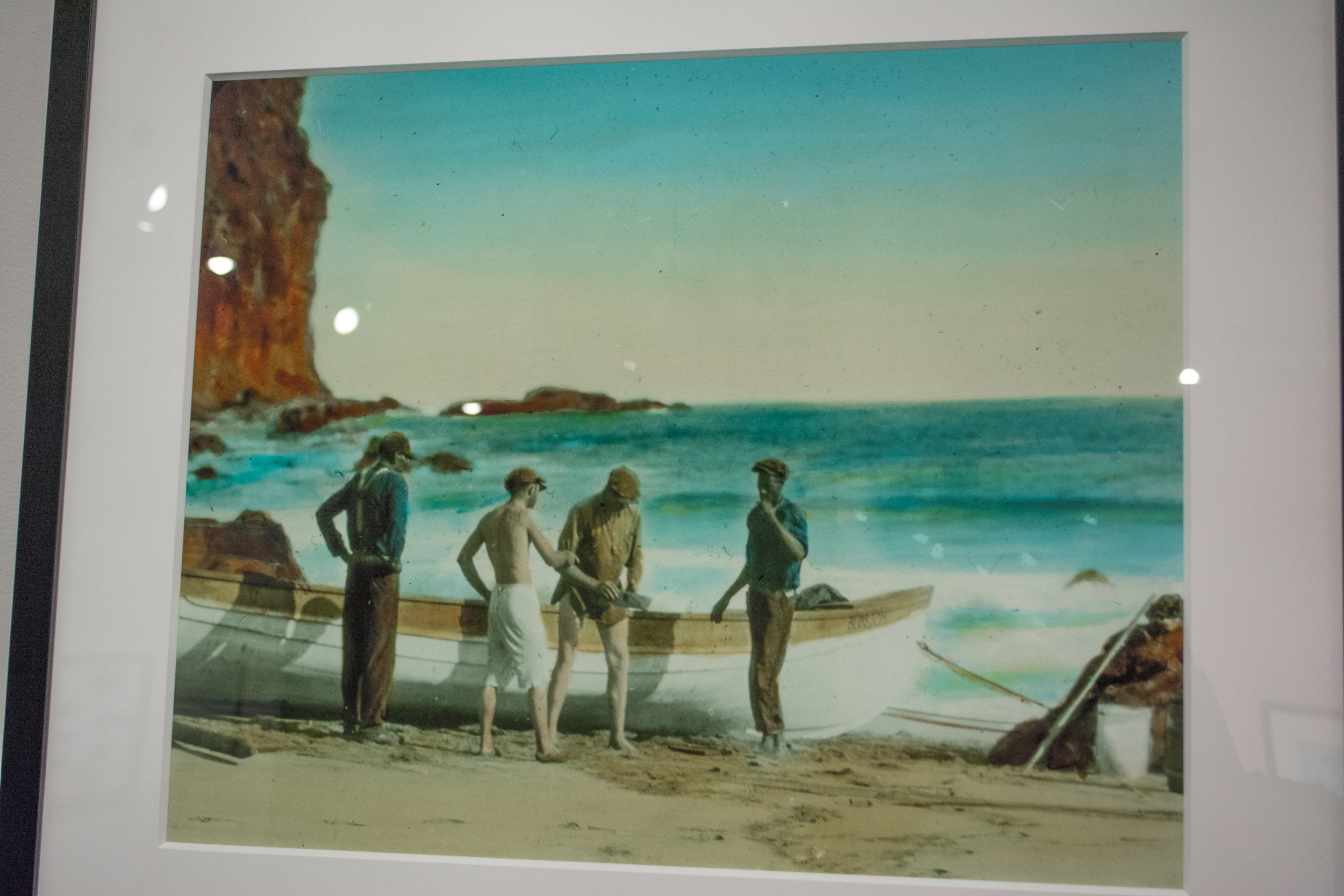
A longboat belonging to the Blossom lands on a beach in Senegal

The angered Rockwell only conceded when Simmons told him that the expedition was to travel to continental Africa to collect big-game specimens. Although the main goal of the expedition to northwestern Africa was to collect birds to use in a comparative study of specimens from Cape Verde, Cuyler and Rockwell were sent on a side expedition in Bundu. They spent several weeks collecting larger mammals before returning to the expedition.

After spending almost five months in continental Africa, they had collected a total of nearly eighteen hundred bird skins, six hundred birds preserved in formaldehyde, 166 pressed plants, twenty-six large mammals, and more than 350 specimens of small mammals, reptiles, and fishes. They also completed fieldwork at every location, which produced measurements, color studies, photographs, and film stock. Museum director Rea came to Dakar to meet with the expedition, and separately returned to Cleveland with specimens and fieldwork collected by the expedition after six weeks. Gray and Chantre both left the expedition in Dakar and were replaced with members of the Italian Regia Marina, while Robertson and the group of college-aged men were replaced by a group of sailors from Cape Verde.

=== Return to the United States ===
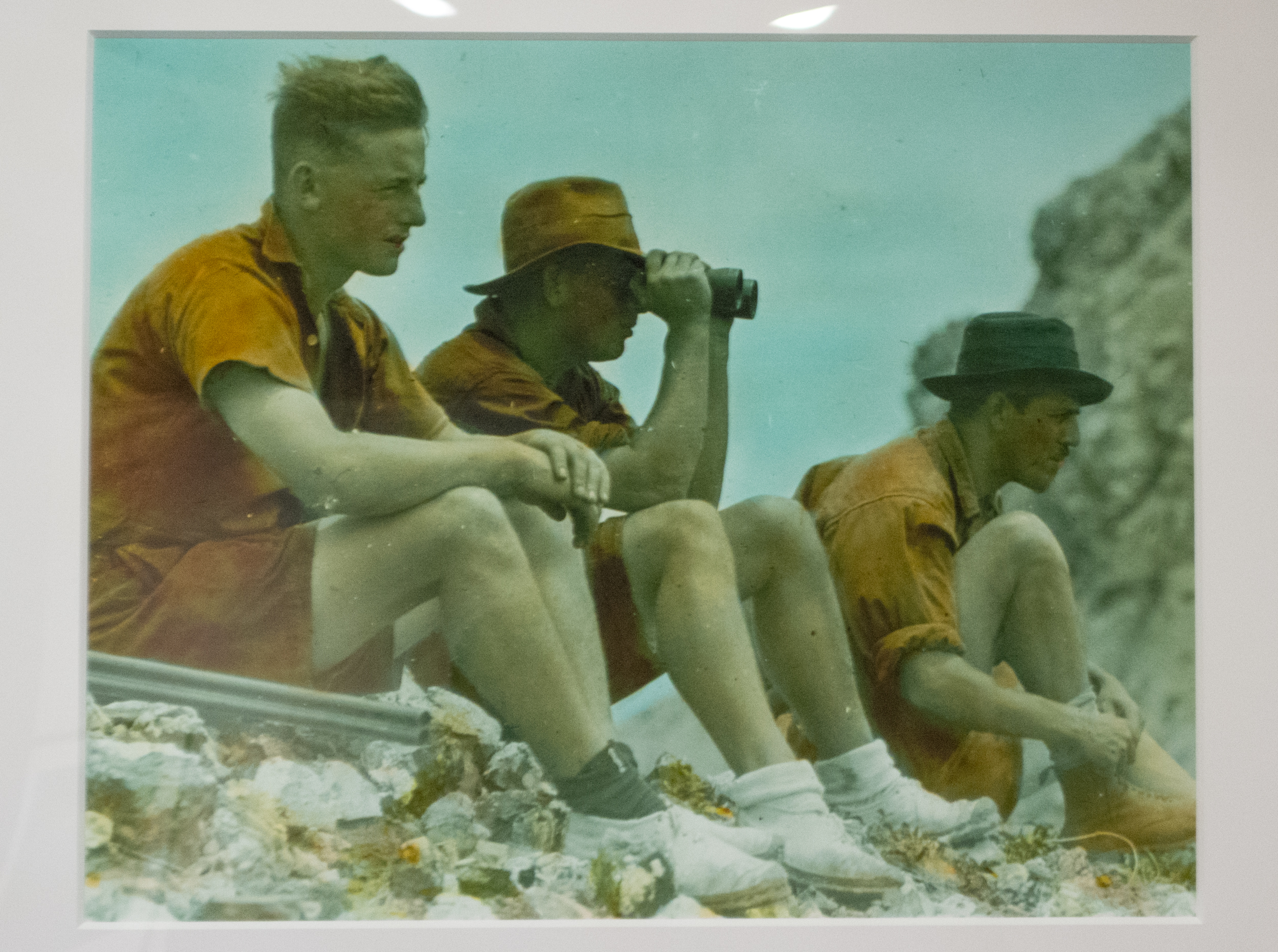
Expedition members surveying Ascension Island for goats

The expedition originally planned to first travel to Trindade and Martim Vaz and then move on to the island of South Georgia. Ultimately, they could not travel to South Georgia Island because of personnel changes, delays caused by severe weather, and the physical limits of the ship. The Blossom was ill-prepared for such a journey; her anchor hoist broke upon their departure from Africa and had to be hauled on board manually.

The Blossom reached Trindade and Martin Vaz more than forty days later, where the expedition made biological surveys. Rockwell and Moses collected specimens of seabirds and spent a month in a cave they secured after driving away land crabs. The two men joined with the rest of the expedition to travel to Rio de Janeiro, where they experienced difficulty in finding replacements for their crew, and then to Ascension Island, Saint Helena, Fernando de Noronha, and Rocas. At Fernando de Noronha, the expedition collected specimens of vireos, among other species. On their way back to the United States, they spent five days studying in the southwestern corner of the Sargasso Sea.

The Blossom sailed north and landed in South Carolina on June 4, 1926, returning to the United States after traveling for more than two years and seven months and over 22,000 miles (35,000 kilometres). After the Blossom was docked in Charleston, South Carolina, the museum sold her to da Lomba, who then used her for business ventures until she was shipwrecked off the coast of Africa in 1930.

== Outcome ==
The expedition produced thirteen thousand specimens of animals, in addition to photographs, thousands of feet of film, and scientific data, despite not making it to South Georgia Island as originally planned. Of the specimens collected, over five thousand were birds, while most of the remainder were saltwater fishes and invertebrates.

According to the Encyclopedia of Cleveland History, the cost of the expedition was $75,000. (Note: $75,000 in 1926 equates to approximately $1,300,000 in 2024, according to calculations based on the consumer price index measure of inflation.) The Morning Journal provides a figure of $125,000 (Note: $125,000 in 1922 equates to approximately $2,200,000 in 2024, according to calculations based on the consumer price index measure of inflation.) for the amount of funding provided by Elizabeth Blossom, which accounts for the purchase of the Blossom and the salaries of its crew.

After the expedition, Simmons worked at the Cleveland Museum of Natural History as a curator of ornithology, where he arranged the museum's collections for research. Cuyler also took a position as part of the museum's scientific staff.

== See also ==
- Whitney South Sea Expedition
- Brewster–Sanford expedition
