= Royce Engstrom =

American chemist

- Education: University of Nebraska Omaha; University of Wisconsin, Madison
- Spouse: Mary Engstrom
- Scientific career
- Fields: Chemistry
- Workplaces: University of Montana

Royce C. Engstrom is an American chemist and university administrator.

== Early life and education ==
Engstrom was born in Michigan. His father was a mechanic and his mother was a homemaker. The family moved to Nebraska when he was four.

He completed his undergraduate degree in chemistry at the University of Nebraska Omaha in 1975. He was the first in his family to graduate college.

Engstrom completed his PhD at the University of Wisconsin, Madison in 1979.

== Career ==
From 1999-2004, Engstrom was the vice president for research and dean of graduate education at the University of South Dakota. He was also a tenured chemistry professor.

In 2007 he became a provost at the University of Montana (UM). He held the position for three years, until October 2010, when he became the 17th president of UM. He left the position in 2016. In 2018, it was reported that he would be returning to UM to teach chemistry.

== Personal life ==
He and his wife Mary have two children.

== See also ==
- Presidents of the University of Montana
- University of Montana
