= Charles Clapp =

Charles Clapp may refer to:

- Charles Clapp (rower) (born 1959), American rower
- Charles Clapp (judge) (1923–2004), judge of the United States Tax Court
- Charles Horace Clapp (1883–1911), American geologist and university administrator
- Charles Q. Clapp (1799–1868), American merchant and architect in Portland, Maine
