= Emoia sanfordi =

Conservation status
- Least Concern (IUCN 3.1)

Scientific classification
- Kingdom: Animalia
- Phylum: Chordata
- Class: Reptilia
- Order: Squamata
- Family: Scincidae
- Genus: Emoia
- Species: E. sanfordi

Binomial name
- Emoia sanfordi Schmidt & Burt, 1930

Species of lizard

Emoia sanfordi, known commonly as Sanford's emo skink and Sanford's tree skink, is a species of lizard in the family Scincidae. The species is endemic to Vanuatu.

== Etymology ==
The specific name, sanfordi, is in honor of American ornithologist Leonard Cutler Sanford.

== Common names ==
In Vanuatu, E. sanfordi is known as a-kal in the southern Paamese language and ghala [ɣala] in the Raga language.

== Habitat ==
The preferred natural habitat of E. sanfordi is forest, at altitudes of 0–1,500 m (0–4,921 ft).

== Reproduction ==
E. sanfordi is oviparous.
