= Charles Horace Clapp =

American classicist

- Charles Horace Clapp
- Born: 5 Jun 1883; Boston, Suffolk County, Massachusetts, US
- Died: 9 May 1935 (aged 51); Missoula, Missoula County, Montana, US
- Education: Massachusetts Institute of Technology
- Spouse: Mary R. Brennan
- Scientific career
- Fields: Geology

Charles Horace Clapp (1883 – 1911) was an American geologist and university administrator.

== Biography ==
He was born in Boston, Massachusetts, on June 5, 1883. He married Mary R. Brennan in 1911. He died on May 9, 1935.

== Education ==
He attended The English High School in Boston. He received his B.A. from Massachusetts Institute of Technology in 1905. He completed his Ph.D. at Massachusetts Institute of Technology in 1910.

== Career ==
He served as an instructor in geology and mining at the University of North Dakota from 1905 to 1907. From 1907 to 1910 he was an instructor of geology and mining at the Massachusetts Institute of Technology.

In 1913, he became the professor of geology at the University of Arizona. He became president of the Montana School of Mines in 1918 where he then helped establish the Montana State Bureau of Mines and Metallurgy in 1919.

He served as the president of the University of Montana from September 1921 to October 1935.

== Bibliography ==
He is the author of a number of notable books:

- Geology of the Nanaimo map-area
- Geology of the Victoria and Saanich map-areas, Vancouver Island, B. C
- Sooke and Duncan map-areas, Vancouver Island
- Southern Vancouver Island

== See also ==
- Presidents of the University of Montana
- University of Montana
