= Edward Octavius Sisson =

American classicist

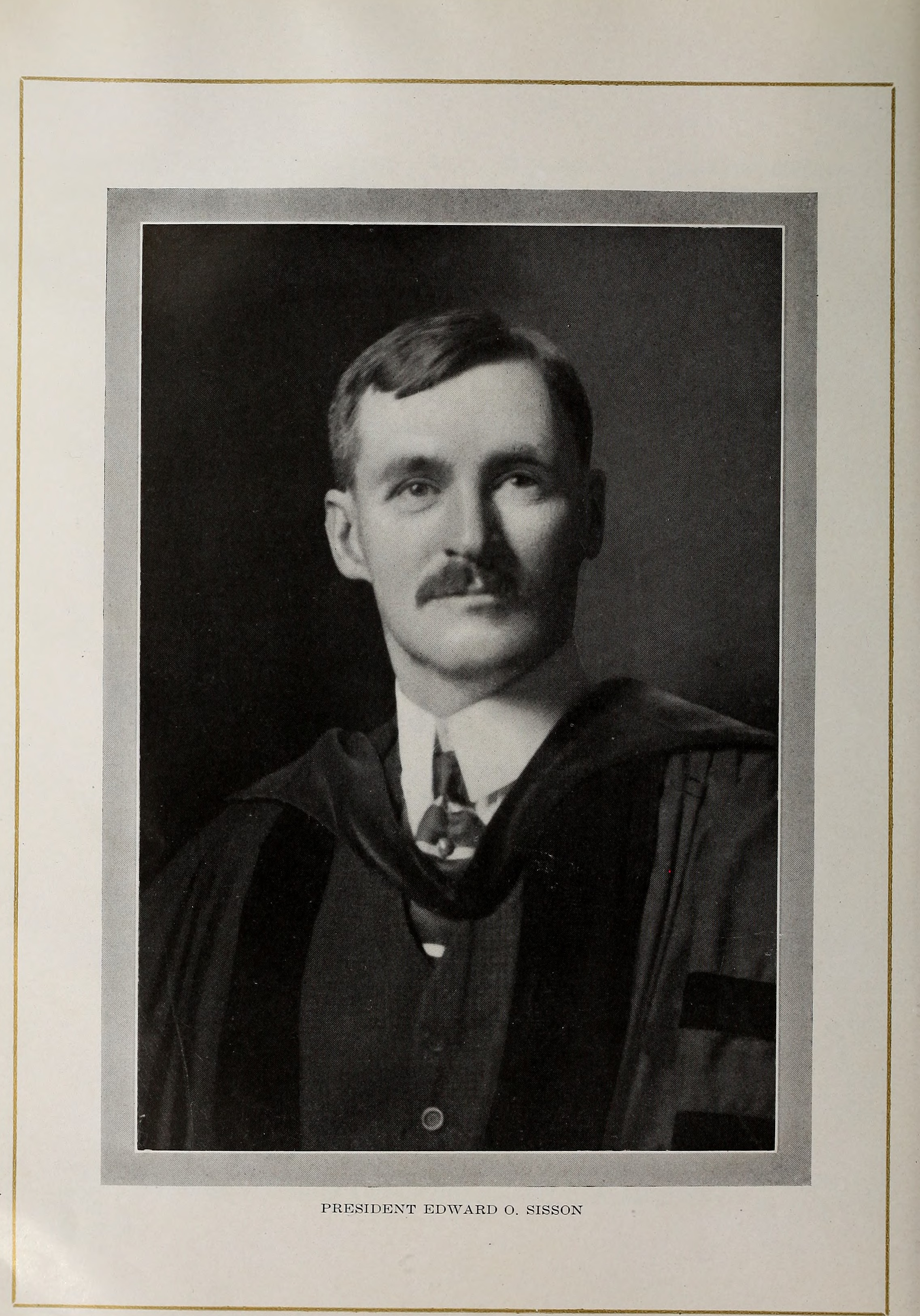
- Edward Octavius Sisson
- Born: 24 May 1869; Gateshead, Durham, England, United Kingdom
- Died: 24 January 1949 (aged 79); Carmel-by-the-Sea, California
- Education: Kansas State University
- Spouse: Nellie May Stowell
- Scientific career
- Fields: Classics

Edward Octavius Sisson (1869–1949) was an American classicist, historian, philosopher and university administrator.

== Biography ==
He was born on May 24, 1869 in Gateshead, Durham to George Sisson and Mary Arnott. He married Astid Honoria, with whom he had a son Richard Alvin Sisson. He died on 24 January 1949, in Carmel-by-the-Sea, California.

== Education ==
He completed his BSc from Kansas State College in 1886. He completed his BA degree from Chicago in 1890. He completed his PhD from Harvard University in 1905.

== Career ==
He served as teacher and principal of public schools from 1886 to 1891. He served as lecturer at University of California, Reed College and Harvard University.

He served as one of the Presidents of the University of Montana from September 1917 to August 1921.

In 1947, Sisson was awarded an honorary degree from Reed College.

== Bibliography ==
His notable books include:

- Francis Bacon and the Modern University
- The high school's cure of souls
- The essentials of character

== See also ==
- Presidents of the University of Montana
- University of Montana
