= Leonard Cutler Sanford =

American surgeon and amateur ornithologist

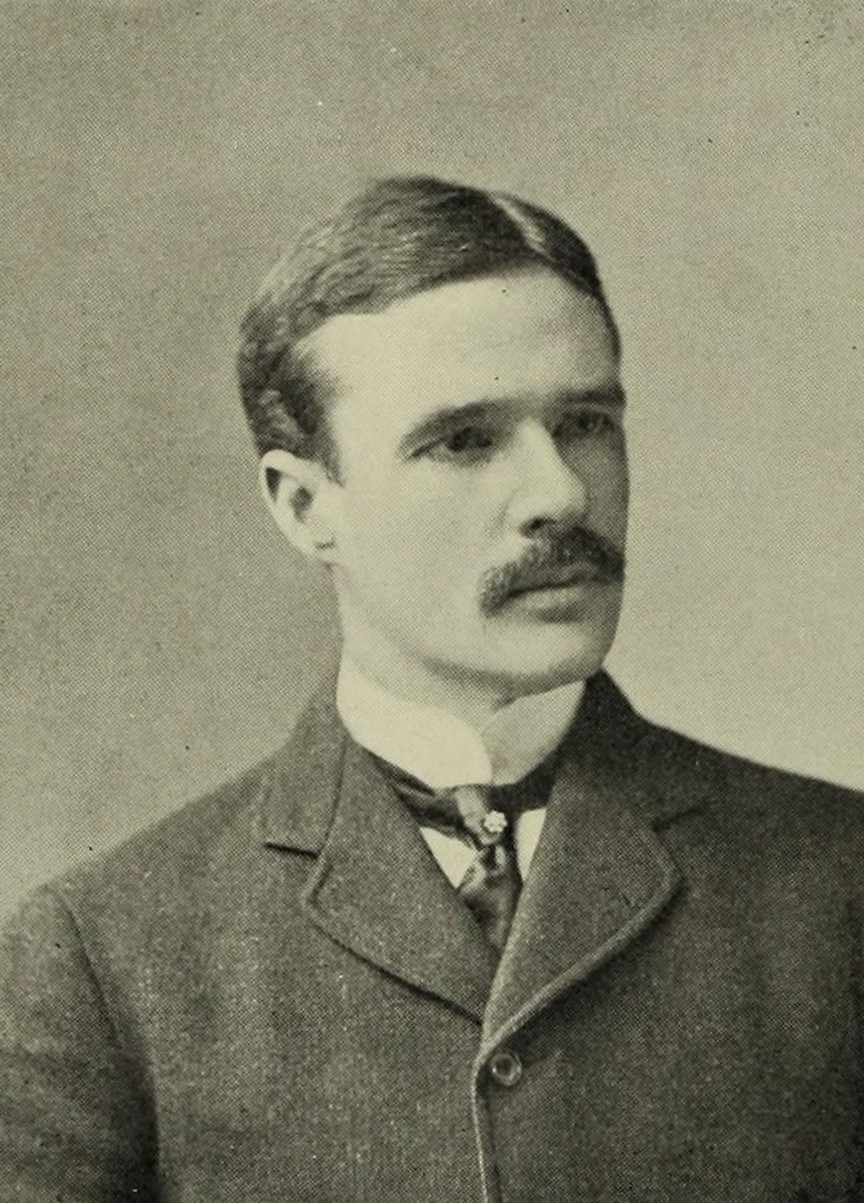
- Born: September 19, 1869; New Haven, Connecticut
- Died: December 7, 1950 (aged 81); Florida
- Education: Yale College, B.A. (1890); Yale Medical School, M.D. (1893)
- Occupations: Surgeon; Ornithologist
- Organization: American Museum of Natural History
- Eponymous taxa: Sanford's sea-eagle; Sanford's bowerbird; Sanford's brown lemur; Sanford's emo skink

Leonard Cutler Sanford (September 19, 1869 – December 7, 1950) was an American surgeon and amateur ornithologist, who served as a trustee of the American Museum of Natural History for nearly thirty years and played a key role in building up its bird collections.

== Early years ==
Sanford was born in New Haven, Connecticut. He graduated from Yale University and pursued a successful career as a surgeon. However, his main interest throughout his life was ornithology. He became an Associate of the American Ornithologists' Union in 1902, and a Life Associate in 1919.

== American Museum of Natural History ==
Although Sanford was elected a trustee of the museum in February 1921, his association with the institution had begun much earlier. As well as acquiring many specimens of rare and extinct species for the museum's collection, he instigated a major collecting expedition to South America by persuading philanthropist Frederick F. Brewster of New Haven to finance it. The Brewster-Sanford Expedition, headed by Rollo Beck, took place from 1912 to 1917 and produced a large number of specimens, providing the basis for studies resulting in the publication of Robert Cushman Murphy’s two-volume “Oceanic Birds of South America”.

Sanford was also instrumental in establishing the long-term relationship between philanthropist Harry Payne Whitney and the museum, which first saw Whitney financing the Whitney Memorial Wing of the museum, which housed the department of birds there. Subsequently, Whitney sponsored the extensive Whitney South Seas Expedition, which lasted from 1921 to 1932, making biological and anthropological collections through Micronesia, Polynesia and Melanesia. Even after Whitney's death in 1930, Sanford persuaded his widow, Gertrude Vanderbilt Whitney, and children to acquire for the museum the huge bird collection, of some 280,000 specimens, of Lord Rothschild’s private museum at Tring in England. He also initiated the Blossom Expedition, which took place from 1923 to 1926 and procured specimens from Africa, South America, and the South Atlantic for the collections of the Cleveland Museum of Natural History. As the American Museum's Whitney South Sea Expedition was similar in purpose, the museums agreed to exchange material from both expeditions to enhance both museums' collections.

Sanford died in 1950 at his winter home in Florida.

He is commemorated in the names of Sanford's sea-eagle (Haliaeetus sanfordi), Sanford's bowerbird (Archboldia sanfordi), and Sanford's brown lemur (Eulemur sanfordi). Also, a species of lizard, Sanford's emo skink (Emoia sanfordi), is named in his honor.

== Publications ==
- Sanford, L.C.; Bishop, L.B.; Van Dyke, T.S. (1903). The Water-Fowl Family. American Sportsman's Library. Macmillan.
