= Brewster–Sanford expedition =

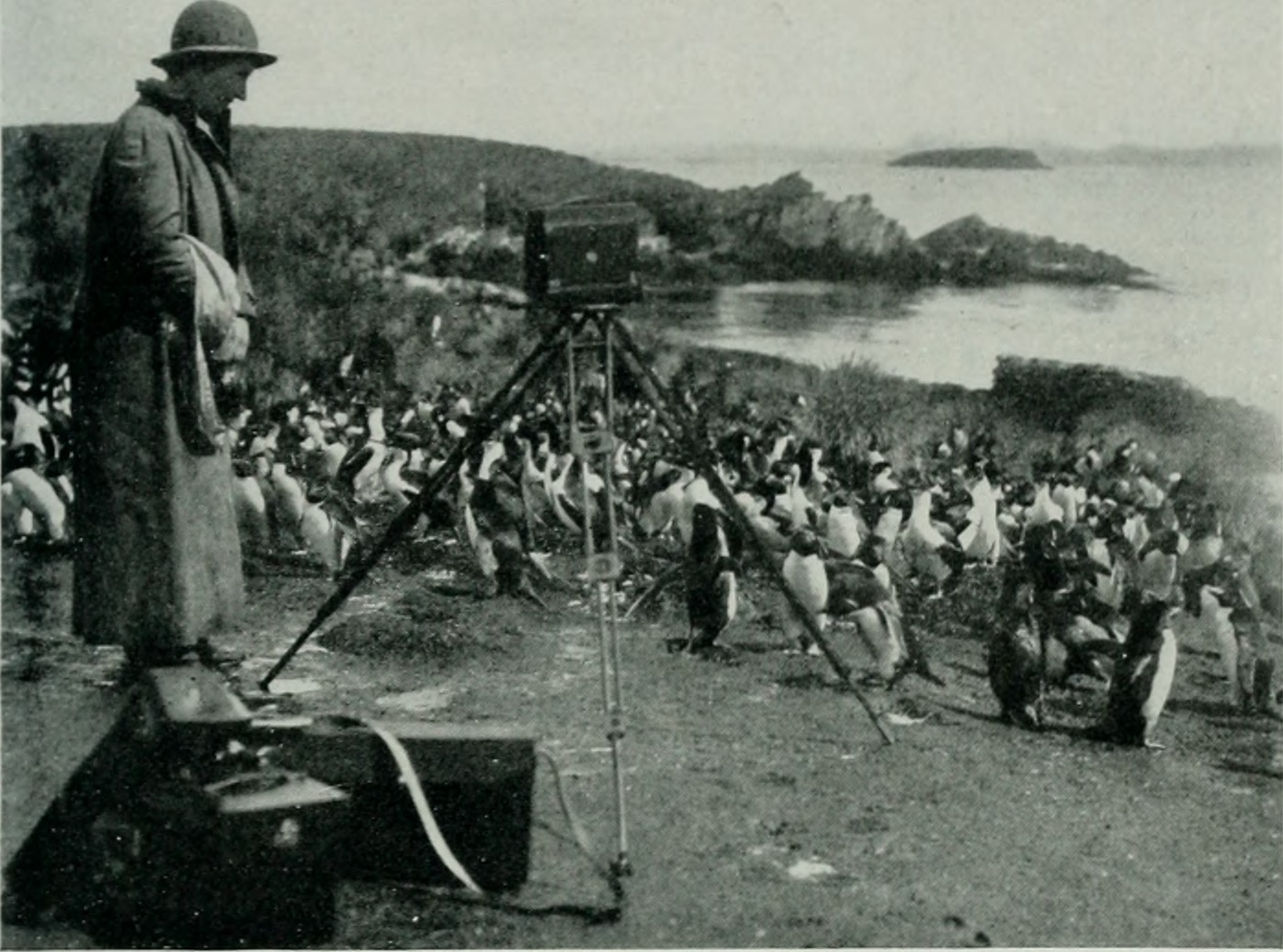
Photographing birds on the Falkland Islands

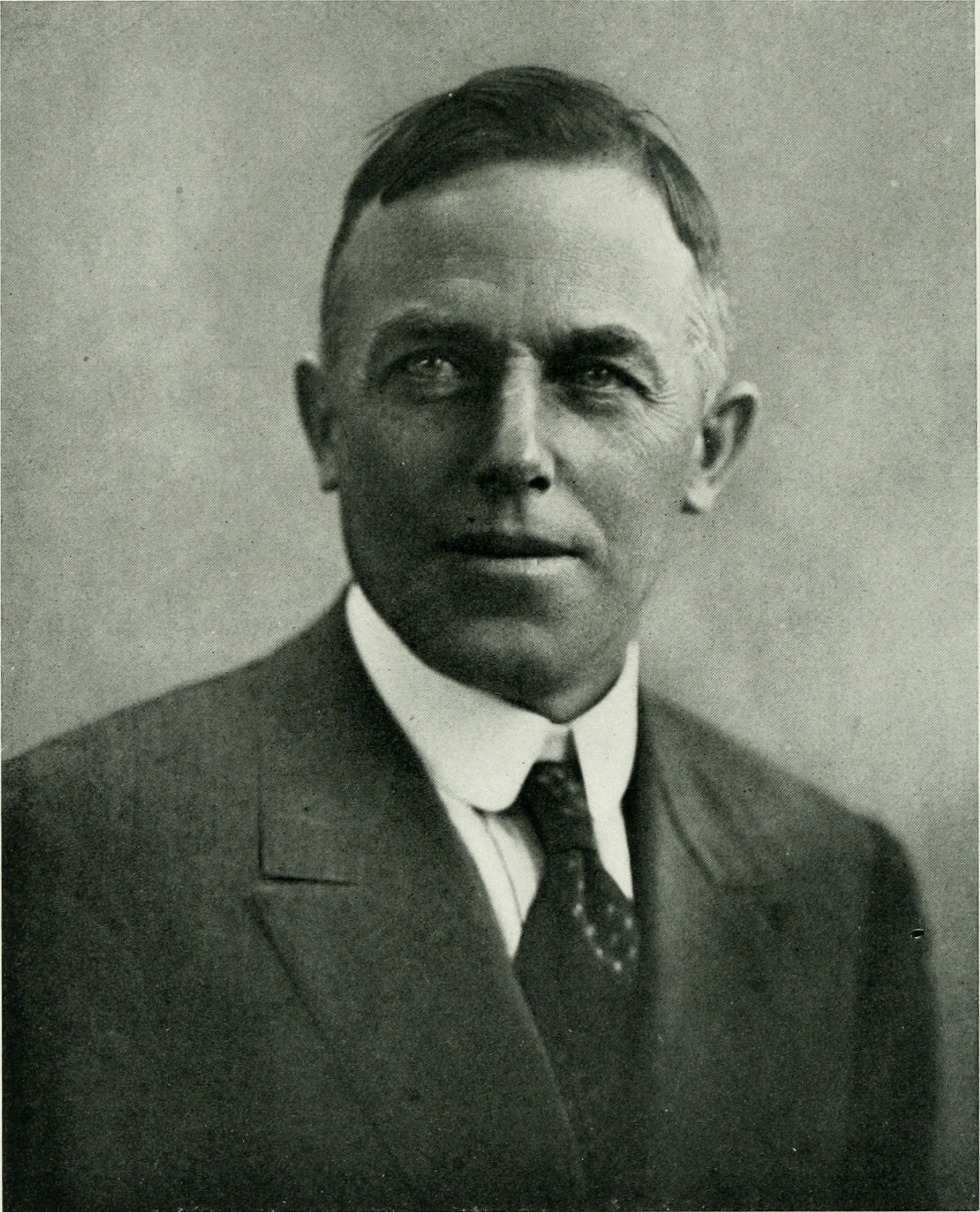
Rollo Beck, one of the members of the expedition

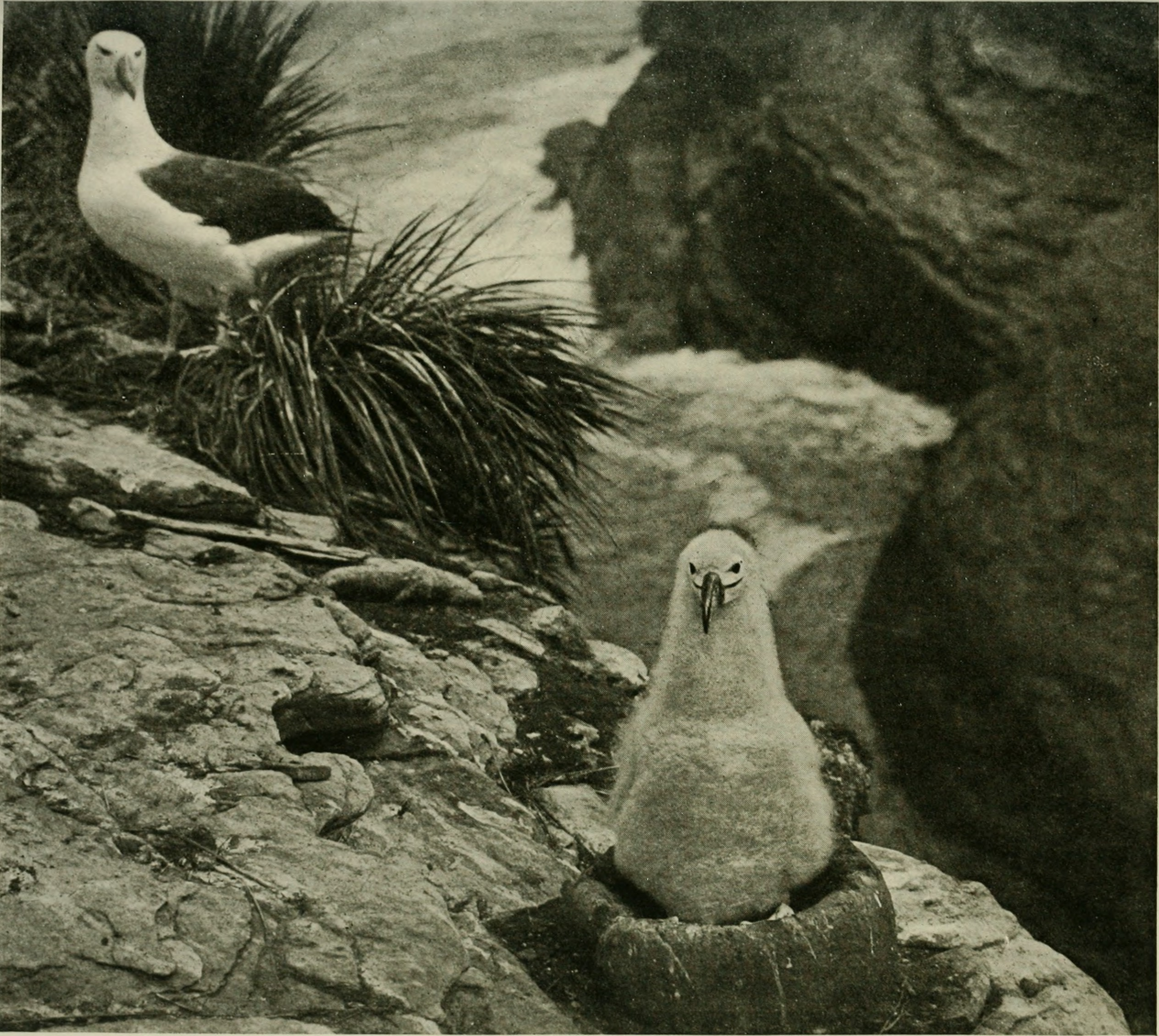
Albatross nest, photo taken during expedition

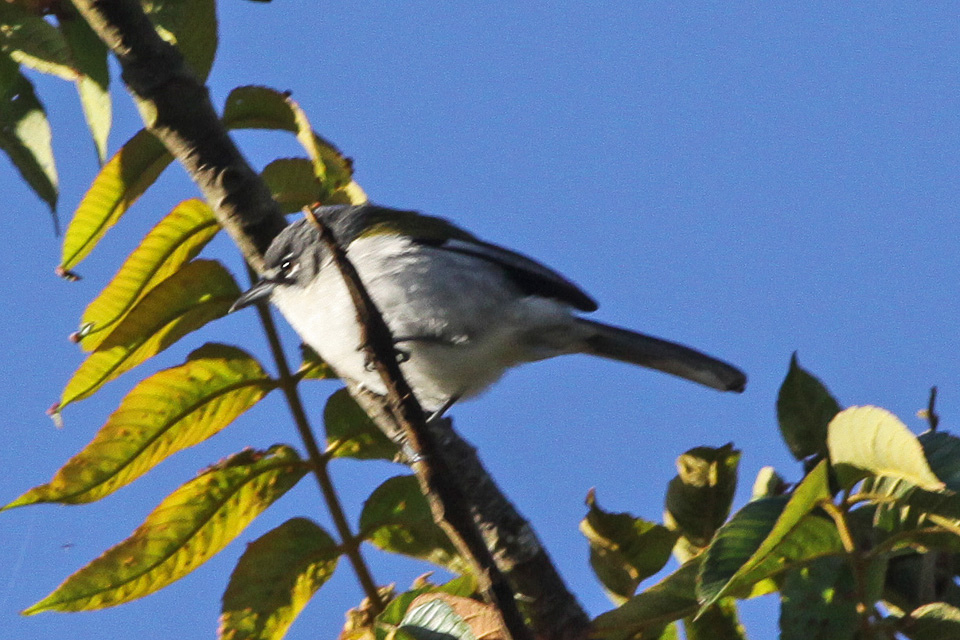
White-winged warbler (Xenoligea montana) a species first described during the Brewster-Sanford expedition

The Brewster–Sanford expedition was an ornithological collecting expedition which procured specimens, principally of South American seabirds, for the collections of the American Museum of Natural History. It was initiated by Dr. Leonard Cutler Sanford and financially supported by Frederick F. Brewster, both of New Haven, Connecticut. The expedition took place from 1912 to 1917, with its core members the experienced bird collector Rollo Beck and his wife Ida, though additional assistance was used at many places. Although most of the nearly 8,000 specimens collected were seabirds, land birds were opportunistically acquired as well. Various watercraft were used in the course of the expedition, where much of the collection work was carried out at sea.

== Expedition ==
The Becks left San Francisco on 4 December 1912. The first collecting was carried out in Peru, working along the coast as well as making some inland trips. Based at shore stations, and using hired fishing boats, Rollo Beck would often row out to sea alone, and sometimes with a man to assist him, as far as 20 km offshore, collecting birds from dawn to dusk. 1913 was taken up by work along the coasts of Peru and Chile, with trips also made to the Juan Fernández Islands. 1914 saw the Becks working their way southwards along the Chilean coast to the Chiloé Archipelago and then, in July, to Magallanes Province.

Ramifications of the outbreak of war in Europe caused some difficulties for the Becks, but in August 1914 they visited the Falkland Islands and then moved to Mar del Plata, Argentina, where they were based until November. Then, after revisiting the Falklands, and using a hired sloop, the “Leguri,” the Becks spent December and January sailing and collecting in the waterways and islands around Cape Horn and the Beagle Channel.

From February 1915 the Becks collected from Magallanes and around Tierra del Fuego using the schooner “Antarctica.” They visited the Falklands in September and again in October, where they stayed through January 1916 before moving northwards to Uruguay and the coast of Brazil which they worked for several months before sailing to the Caribbean and collecting through the island of Hispaniola from September 1916 to July 1917. From mid July to the end of August 1917 the Becks collected in Cuba and returned to the United States at the beginning of September.

Beck's report and narrative of the expedition was summarised by Robert Cushman Murphy in his “Oceanic Birds of South America,” in which he comments:

”The specimens of birds obtained during the course of the Brewster-Sanford Expedition number 7,853. Those that may be broadly classed as water birds comprise upwards of a hundred species. The collection is, naturally, more notable for its full representation of the South American sea bird fauna, including hitherto little known rarities, than it is for forms new to science.”

“When one considers the faultless character of the skins, and the great body of associated data, such as nests, eggs, notes, and photographs – and when one balances all of these tangible credits against the obstacles, disappointment, and discomforts of the journey briefly retold above – then it becomes clear that the treasure obtained by Mr Beck and his courageous helpmeet is a monument to rare skill and indomitable persistence. Up to date, it is safe to say, no other ornithological collector has carried through a similar campaign, or matched such scientific spoils.”

== Results ==
New birds described from Hispaniola include the least poorwill (Siphonorhis brewsteri), the white-winged warbler (Xenoligea montana), and the Hispaniolan subspecies of the grey-fronted quail-dove (Geotrygon caniceps leucometopia).
