= Presidents of the University of Montana =

The University of Montana
- Motto: Lux et Veritas
- Motto in English: Light and Truth
- Type: Public, doctoral university
- Established: 1893
- Endowment: US$108.0 million
- President: Seth Bodnar
- Provost: Adrea Lawrence
- Faculty: 581 full-time, 250 part-time
- Students: 11,865 total (fall 2017)
- Undergraduates: 9,323 total (fall 2017)
- Location: Missoula, Montana, U.S.
- Campus: University town, 220 acres (89 ha)
- Colors: Maroon and silver
- Nicknames: Grizzlies and Lady Griz
- Sporting affiliations: NCAA Division I Football Championship; Big Sky Conference
- Mascot: Monte
- Website: www.umt.edu

The University of Montana was founded in 1893.

== Oscar John Craig (1895-1908) ==
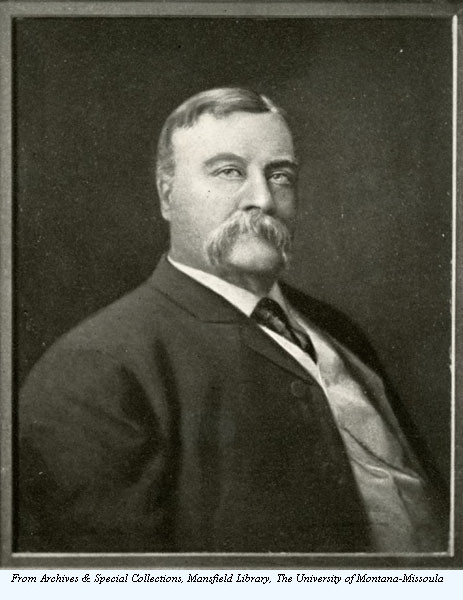

Term

July 1895 - October 1908
Retired (ill health)

Predecessor

none

Successor

Clyde V. Duniway

Born April 18, 1846
Madison, IN

Died March 5, 1911 (aged 64)

Education

A.B., Asbury University, 1881
A.M., DePauw University, 1884
Ph.D., University of Wooster, 1887

Buildings Created and Programs Established Buildings

- Venture Center/Science Hall, 1898 (razed in 1983)
- University Hall (Main Hall), 1898
- Women's Hall (Math Building), 1902
- Gymnasium, 1903 (razed in 1965)
- University Library (Jeannette Rankin Hall), 1908

Programs
Schools of Engineering and Pharmacy
Departments of History, Education, English, Literature, Vocal Expression, Chemistry, Mathematics, Latin and Greek, Modern Languages, Physics and Geology, Biology, Music, and Drawing

Organizations

- The Kaimin
- Associated Students at The University of Montana (ASUM)
- Associated Mechanical Engineers
- Silver Cornet Band
- two glee clubs
- ΣΝ, ΣΧ
Eponymous Landmarks:
- Craig Hall (Dormitory)
- Oscar J. Craig Heritage Society (society includes individuals who have committed a planned gift to benefit The University of Montana.)

== Clyde Augustus Duniway (1908-1912) ==
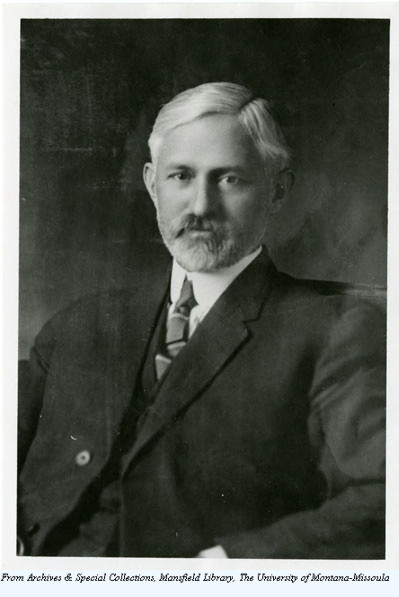

Term

October 1908 - September 1912
Dismissed ("understood that this action has been taken because President Duniway refused to appoint a local politician as dean of the law school" — Science Magazine)

Predecessor

Oscar J. Craig

Successor

Edwin B. Craighead

Born November 2, 1866 (Albany, OR)

Died December 24, 1944 (aged 78)

Education

A.B., Cornell University, 1892
A.M., Harvard University, 1894
Ph.D., Harvard University, 1897
Additional study Leipzig, Berlin, and Paris, 1901-02

Landmarks

- The first "M" created, 1909
- Senior Bench, 1910

Programs
School of Law
Departments of Biology, Botany and Forestry, Fine Arts, Chemical Engineering, Civil Engineering, and Electrical Engineering Courses in Zoology and Psychology

Organizations

- Debate League
- YMCA, YWCA
- Silent Sentinel
- ΚΑΘ, ΚΚΓ, ΔΓ
Eponymous Landmarks: Duniway Hall (Dormitory)

== Edwin Boone Craighead (1912-1915) ==
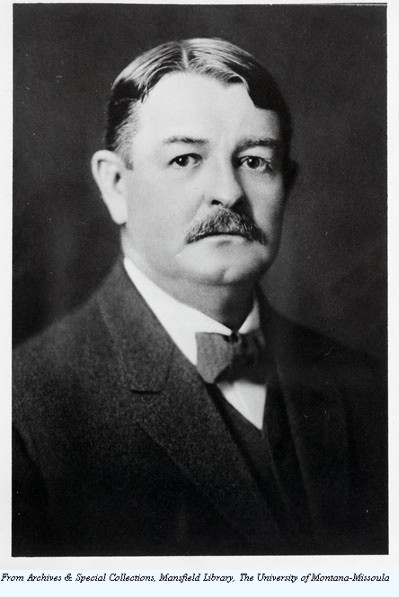

Term

September 1912 - October 1915
Dismissed: (fell out of favor with the Board of Education after promoting a consolidation of the university system in Montana)

Predecessor

Clyde V. Duniway

Successor

Randall M. M. Savage

Born

March 3, 1861 (Hams Prairie, MO)

Died

October 22, 1920 (aged 59)

Education

A.M., Central College, 1883
LL. D., University of Missouri, 1898
D.C.L., University of the South, 1907

Landmarks

- Wooden "M," 1912
- Whitewashed rock "M," 1915

Programs
Schools of Journalism, Music, and Forestry
Departments of Home Economics, Political Science, Manual Arts, and Economics and Sociology

Eponymous Landmarks:
- Craighead Apartments (University Village)
University News:
- The University of Montana won a place on the accredited list of the North Central Association of Colleges and Secondary Schools for the first time.
- Name changed from University of Montana to State University of Montana with the creation of the Montana University System. (1913)
- First Homecoming (November 6, 1914)

== Frederick Charles Scheuch (Interim) (1915–1917) ==
Term 1915-1917

Interim

Predecessor

Edwin B. Craighead

Successor

Edward O. Sisson

Born

March 29, 1871
Lafayette, Indiana

Died

January 17, 1954 (aged 82)
Los Angeles, California

Education

B.M.E., Purdue University, 1893
A.C., Purdue University, 1894

Buildings Created and Programs Established

Eponymous Landmarks

== Edward Octavius Sisson 1917-1921) ==

Term

September 1917 - August 1921

Predecessor

Frederick Charles Scheuch

Successor

Charles H. Clapp

Born

May 24, 1869
Gateshead, Co. Durham, England

Died

January 24, 1949 (aged 79)
Monterey, California, U.S.

Education

B.S., Kansas State Agricultural College, 1886
A.B., University of Chicago, 1893
Ph.D., Harvard University, 1905

Buildings and Landmarks

- Memorial Row, 1919
- Simpkins Hall, 1920 (razed in 1960)
- Marcus Cook Hall, 1921 (razed in 1935)

Programs Established
School of Business Administration Departments of Astronomy and Military Science Pre-Medicine Program Student Army Training Corps

Eponymous Landmarks::
- Sisson Apartments (University Village)

Personal and Accomplishments

== Charles Horace Clapp (1921–1935) ==

Term

September 1921 - May 1935

Predecessor

Edward O. Sisson

Successor

George Finlay Simmons

Born

June 5, 1883
Boston, Massachusetts

Died

May 9, 1935 (aged 51)
Missoula, Montana

Education

B.S., Massachusetts Institute of Technology, 1905
Ph.D. Massachusetts Institute of Technology, 1910
Additional study at Harvard University, 1910

Buildings

- South Hall (Elrod Hall), 1921
- University Library (Social Science Building), 1921
- Men's Gymnasium (Shreiber Gym), 1921
- Heating Plant, 1922
- Forestry Building, 1922
- North Hall (Brantley Hall), 1923
- Dornblazer Field, 1924
- Corbin Hall, 1927
- Student Union (Fine Arts Building), 1935

Programs
College of Arts and Sciences School of Religion

Eponymous Landmarks: Charles H. Clapp Building (Science Complex)

Personal and Accomplishments

== George Finlay Simmons (1936-1941) ==

Term

January 1936 - April 1941

Predecessor

Charles H. Clapp

Successor

Ernest O. Melby

Born

October 25, 1895
Sherman, Texas

Died

July 19, 1955 (aged 59)
Chicago, Illinois

Education

B.A., University of Texas, 1921
M.A., University of Texas, 1922
Ph.D., University of Chicago, 1934

Buildings

- Journalism Building, 1936
- Chemistry/Pharmacy Building, 1938
- Addition to the Natural Sciences Building, 1938
- New Hall (Turner Hall), 1939

Programs
Departments of Bacteriology and Hygiene and Philosophy Programs in Social Welfare Studies, Pre-Nursing, Medical Technology, Wildlife Technology, and Wildlife Management

Eponymous Landmarks

Personal and Accomplishments

== Ernest Oscar Melby (1941-1945) ==

Term

October 1941 - August 1945

Predecessor

George F. Simmons

Successor

James A. McCain

Born

August 16, 1891
Lake Park, Minnesota

Died

January 11, 1987 (aged 95)
Boca Raton, Florida

Education

B.A., St. Olaf's College, 1913
M.A., University of Minnesota, 1926
Ph.D., University of Minnesota, 1928

Landmarks The Lubrecht Experimental Forest, 1942 Programs
The Navy V-1 and the Civilian Pilot Training Programs The Montana Study

Eponymous Landmarks

Personal and Accomplishments

== James Allen McCain (1945-1950) ==

Term

September 1945 - July 1950

Predecessor

Ernest O. Melby

Successor

Carl McFarland

Born

December 8, 1907
York, South Carolina

Died

March 1987 (aged 79)

Education

A.B., Woffard College, 1926
A.M., Duke University, 1929
Ed.D., Stanford University, 1948

Buildings

- Jumbo Hall, 1946 (razed in 1960)
- Education Building, 1948
- Forestry School Memorial Greenhouse, 1950

Programs
School of Public and Private Administration Department of Sociology Wildlife Research Unit Stella Duncan Memorial Research Institute

Eponymous Landmarks

Personal and Accomplishments

== Carl McFarland (1951-1958) ==

Term

March 1951 - May 1958

Predecessor

James A. McCain

Successor

Harry K. Newburn

Born

October 6, 1904
Seattle, Washington

Died

May 16, 1979 (aged 74)

Education

B.A., The University of Montana, 1928
M.A., The University of Montana, 1929
LL.B., The University of Montana, 1930
S.J.D., Harvard University, 1932

Buildings

- Craig Hall, 1952
- Field House (Adams Center), 1953
- Women's Center (McGill Hall), 1953
- Music Building, 1953
- Liberal Arts, 1953
- Ryman Addition, 1955
- Robert B. Curry Health Center, 1955
- The Lodge, 1956
- North Corbin Hall, 1956
- Art Annex/Grizzly Pool, 1957
- Duniway Hall, 1957
- Craighead/Sisson Apartments 1957

Programs
College of Fine Arts Programs in Liberal Arts, Radio/Television, and Drama Courses in Russian, Italian, Dance, and Physical Therapy ROTC

Eponymous Landmarks:
- Carl McFarland Scholarship Endowment (Criteria: Native American students at The University of Montana who are Montana residents)

Personal and Accomplishments

== Harry Kenneth Newburn (1959-1963) ==
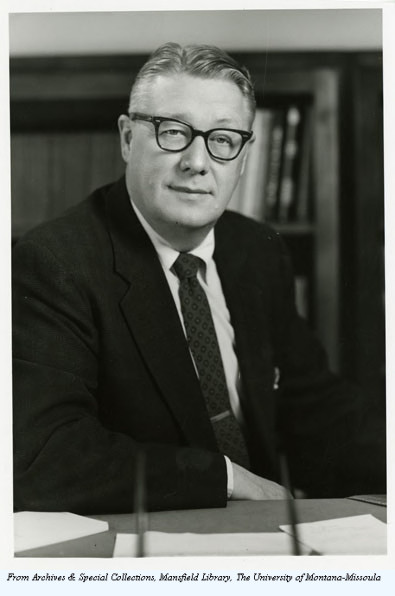

Term

July 1959 - September 1963

Predecessor

Carl McFarland

Successor

Robert Johns

Born

January 1, 1906
Cuba

Died August 25, 1972 (aged 71)

Education

B.E., Western Illinois State Teachers College, 1928
A.M., University of Iowa, 1931
Ph.D., University of Iowa, 1933
Hon. D.H.L. Northern Michigan College, 195

Buildings

- Health Sciences Building, 1961
- Law Building, 1962
- Additions and renovations of the Physical Plant and Liberal *Arts Building, 1962

Programs
Department of Radio/Television Programs in Social Welfare, Forest Conservation, and Microbiology

Eponymous Landmarks:

Personal and Accomplishments

== Robert Johns (1963-1966) ==

Term

September 1963 - August 1966

Predecessor

Harry K. Newburn

Successor

Robert T. Pantzer

Born May 12, 1921

Died May 31, 2007 (aged 86)

Education

Ph.D., Stanford University, 1950

Buildings

Knowles Hall, 1963
Miller Hall, 1965
Addition to Harry Adams Field House, 1965

Programs
Physical Therapy Program Courses in Linguistics, Communications, and Resource Conservation Upward Bound Regional School Facilities Planning Center U.S. Forest Service Experimental Laboratory

Eponymous Landmarks

Personal and Accomplishments

== Robert T. Pantzer (1966-1974) ==

Term

December 1966 - June 1974

Predecessor

Robert Johns

Successor

Richard C. Bowers

Born June 18, 1914

Died October 28, 2004 (aged 90)

Education

B.A., The University of Montana, 1940
L.L.B., The University of Montana, 1947

Buildings and Landmarks

- Elrod Research Station at Flathead Lake, 1967
- Aber Hall, 1967
- Physical Plant, 1967
- University Center, 1968
- Grizzly Statue and concrete "M," 1968
- Science Complex, 1971
- Rec Annex, 1972
- Mansfield Library, 1973

Programs
Department of Computer Science Programs in Comparative Literature, Environmental, and Native American Studies Courses in Portuguese and Chinese

Eponymous Landmarks:
- Pantzer Hall (dormitory)
- Robert T. Pantzer Presidential Humanitarian Award (Granted annually to a person from The University of Montana or the State of Montana who has contributed substantially to making the university a more open and humane learning environment.)

Personal and Accomplishments

== Richard Charles Bowers (1974-1981) ==

Term

July 1974 - June 1981

Predecessor

Robert T. Pantzer

Successor

Neil S. Bucklew

Born

May 3, 1927
Mount Pleasant, Iowa

Died

May 26, 1996 (aged 69)
Polson, Montana

Education

B.S., University of Michigan, 1948
Ph.D., University of Minnesota, 1953

Buildings

- Urey Underground Lecture Hall, 1981
- Pharmacy/Psychology Building (Skaggs Complex), 1981
- Additions to Law Building and Mansfield Library

Programs
African-American, Latin-American, Asian, and Soviet Studies Programs Pre-Agriculture/Horticulture curriculum

Eponymous Landmarks

Personal and Accomplishments

== Neil S. Bucklew (1981-1986) ==
Term

July 1981 - June 1986

Predecessor

Richard C. Bowers

Successor

James V. Koch

Born

October 23, 1940 (age 86)
Morgantown, West Virginia

Died

Education

B.A., University of Missouri, 1963
M.S., University of North Carolina, 1967
Ph.D., University of Wisconsin, 1971

Buildings

- International House (purchased), 1984
- Performing Arts and Radio/Television Center, 1985
- Washington-Grizzly Stadium, 1986

Programs
Arts and Sciences Honors Program Degree programs in Public Administration and Creative Writing Courses in Film and Telecommunications

Eponymous Landmarks: Bucklew Service Award (Recognizes a Montanan whose efforts foster an understanding throughout the community and state of the university's needs and strengths – and vice versa.)

Personal and Accomplishments

== James Verch Koch (1986-1990) ==
Term

September 1986 - June 1990

Predecessor

Neil S. Bucklew

Successor

George M. Dennison

Education

B.A., Illinois State University, 1964
Ph. D., Northwestern University, 1968

Born

October 7, 1942 (age 84)
Springfield, Illinois

Landmarks

- Kim Williams Linden Grove, 1987

Programs
University College Department of Psychology Courses in Japanese Tourism and Recreation and Wilderness Institutes

Eponymous Landmarks

Personal and Accomplishments

== George M. Dennison (1990–2010) ==
Term

August 1990-October 2010

Predecessor

James V. Koch

Successor

Royce Engstrom

Education

B.S., The University of Montana, 1962
M.A., The University of Montana, 1963
Ph.D., The University of Washington, 1967

Born

August 11, 1935
Buffalo, Illinois

Died

January 2017 (age 85)

Buildings and LandmarksL

- Renovated University Theatre, 1997
- Davidson Honors College, 1996
- Gallagher Business Building, 1996
- Parking Structure, 1996
- James E. Todd Building, 1998
- Renovation of University Center, 1995, 2001
- Pantzer Hall, 1995
- Renovation of Prescott House and Construction of Phyllis J. *Washington Park, 1997?
- Renovation of Miller Hall, 1998
- Renovation of Chemistry Building, 2004
- Adams Center Renovation, 2000
- Fitness and Campus Recreation Center, 2001
- Established MonTEC, 1991
- K. Ross Toole Village, 1997
- Lewis & Clark Village, 2004
- Don Anderson Hall, 2007
- Skaggs Building Additions, 2000, 2007
- Payne Family Native American Center, 2010
- Phyllis J. Washington Education Center, 2009
- Law School Building Addition, 2010
- Washington-Grizzly Stadium Expansions, 1995, 2003, 2009

Programs
Reaccreditation of Pharmacy Program - the new College of Health Professions and Biomedical Sciences housing theSchool of Pharmacy which emerged as a leading research center on campus and ranked seventh nationally among schools of pharmacy for attracting NIH research funding. Re-established Communicative Disorders on campus after a hiatus of nearly 20 years Information Technology Strategic Plan Enhanced the President's Lecture Series First Diversity Plan and Diversity Advisory Council Climate Action Plan and Sustainable Campus Program Quality of Worklife Program

Eponymous Landmarks: George M. and Jane I. Dennison Doctoral Fellows in History Endowment (The fellowships made possible by the endowment will support graduate students pursuing a Ph.D. in history.)

Personal and Accomplishments

== Royce Engstrom (2010-2016) ==
Term

October 15, 2010 - December 31, 2016

Predecessor George Dennison

Successor Sheila Stearns (Interim)

Born

Died

Education

- B.S., Chemistry, University of Nebraska at Omaha
- Ph.D., Analytical Chemistry, University of Wisconsin-Madison.

Buildings Created and Programs Established

- Eck Hall
- Eric and Blair Sprunk Student-Athlete Academic Center
- Gilkey Executive Training Center
- Missoula College River Campus
- Washington-Grizzly Champions Center
Eponymous Landmarks

Personal and Accomplishments

== Sheila Stearns (Interim) (2017 - 2018) ==
Term

January 1, 2017 - January, 2018

Predecessor Royce Engstrom

Successor Seth Bodnar

Born August 30, 1946

Died May 23, 2023

Education

- B.A., History, University of Montana
- M.A., History, University of Montana
- Ed.D., Educational Administration and Supervision, University of Montana

Buildings Created and Programs Established

- University of Montana Humanities Institute
- Accelerate Montana
Eponymous Landmarks

Personal and Accomplishments

== Seth Bodnar (2018-2026) ==
Term

January 1, 2018 - February, 2026

Predecessor Sheila Stearns

Successor Jeremiah Shinn

Born

February 2, 1979

Died

Education United States Military Academy (BS) University of Oxford (MA, MSc)

Buildings Created and Programs Established

Eponymous Landmarks

Personal and Accomplishments

== Jeremiah Shinn (2026-Present) ==
Term

July 1, 2026 - Present

Predecessor Seth Bodnar

Successor

Born

Died

Education

- B.S., Arkansas Tech University
- M.A., University of Michigan
- Ph.D., Educational Leadership, Eastern Michigan University

Buildings Created and Programs Established

Eponymous Landmarks

Personal and Accomplishment
