= Air Fiji =

Airline of Fiji (1967–2009)

IATA	ICAO	Call sign
PC	FAJ	FIJIAIR
- Founded: 1967 (as Air Pacific)
- Commenced operations: 10 July 1967
- Ceased operations: 1 May 2009
- Operating bases: Nadi; Suva
- Frequent-flyer program: Inner Circle Club
- Fleet size: 5
- Destinations: 16
- Headquarters: Nausori, Fiji
- Key people: Sialeni Vuetaki (CEO)
- Website: http://www.airfiji.com.fj

Air Fiji was an airline based in Nausori, Fiji. It operated inter-island services to destinations within the Fijian Islands. Its main base was Nausori International Airport, Suva, with a base at Nadi International Airport.

Before being headquartered in Nausori, Air Fiji was headquartered in Suva.

== History ==
The airline was established in 1967 and started operations on 10 July 1967 as Air Pacific. On 29 March 1971, Air Pacific was renamed Fiji Air and again renamed to Air Fiji in February 1995. It was owned by Aviation Investments (55%), government of Fiji (11%) and other shareholders (34%).

It had 229 employees (at March 2007). Air Fiji suspended operations for two weeks in 2008. Air Fiji ceased operations on 1 May 2009 due to financial issues.

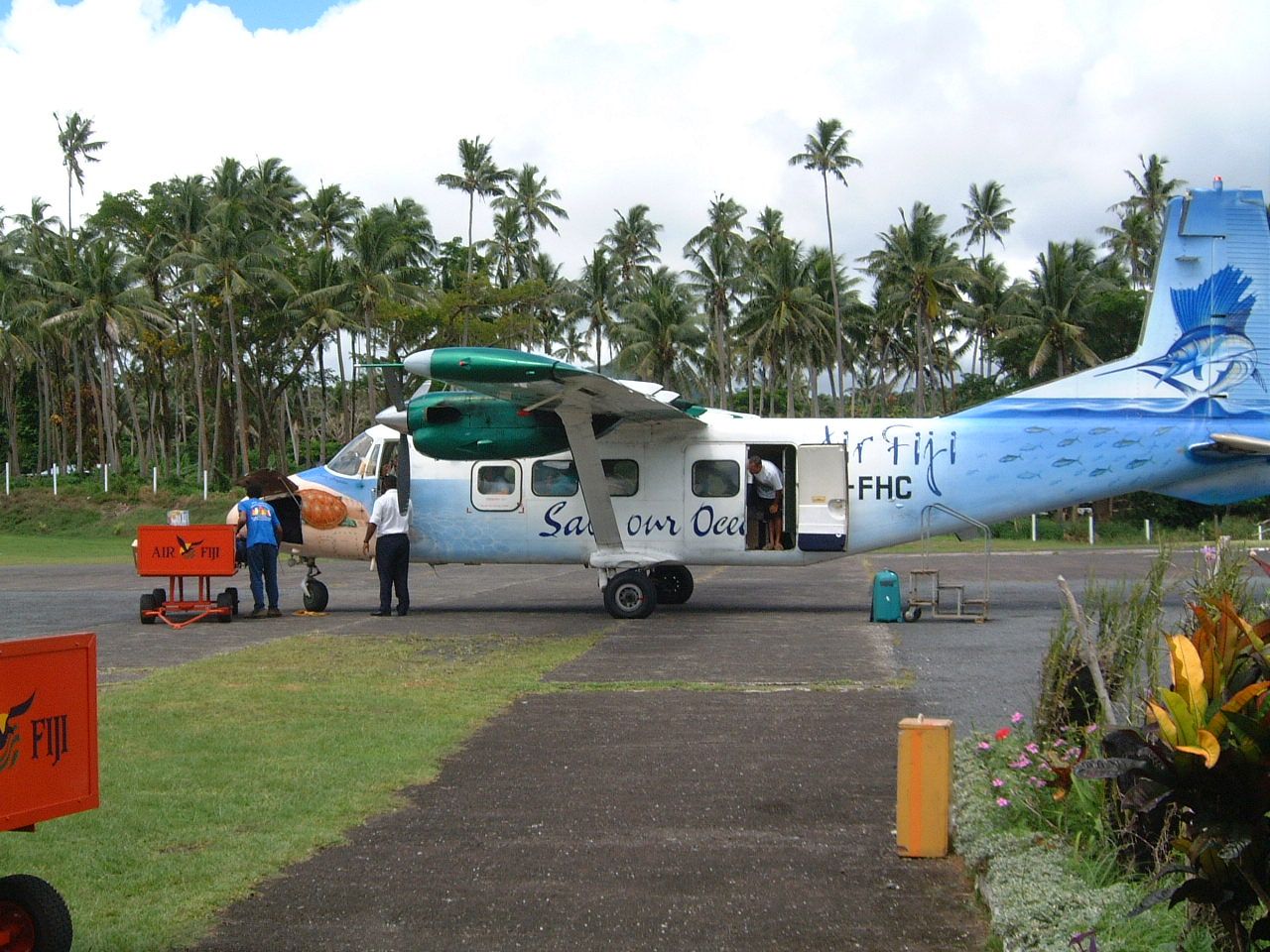
An Air Fiji Harbin Y-12 at Matei Airport, Taveuni Island, Fiji. (2004)

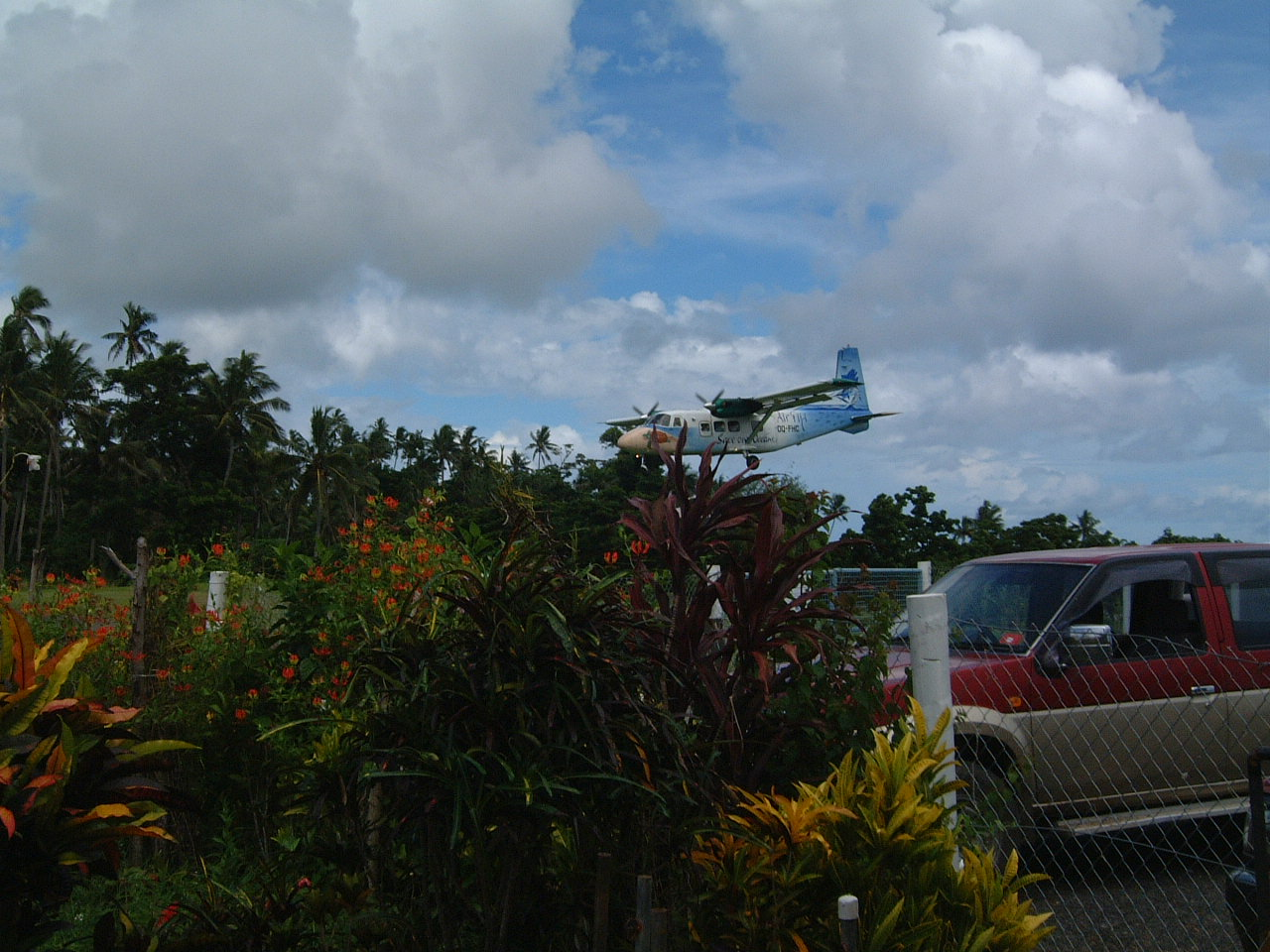
An Air Fiji Harbin Y-12 landing at Matei Airport, Taveuni Island, Fiji. (2004)

== Destinations ==
Air Fiji operated the following services (at June 2008):

- Fiji
  - Cicia - Cicia Airport
  - Gau - Gau Airport
  - Kadavu - Kadavu Airport
  - Koro - Koro Airport
  - Labasa - Labasa Airport
  - Lakeba - Lakeba Airport
  - Levuka - Levuka Airfield
  - Malolo Lailai - Malolo Lailai Airport [occasional charter]
  - Mana - Mana Island Airport [occasional charter]
  - Moala - Moala Airport
  - Nadi - Nadi International Airport (Base)
  - Nausori - Nausori International Airport (Base)
  - Rotuma - Rotuma Airport
  - Savusavu - Savusavu Airport
  - Taveuni - Matei Airport
  - Vanuabalavu - Vanuabalavu Airport
- Tuvalu
  - Funafuti - Funafuti International Airport

Terminated destinations before closure:

- Fiji
  - Ba - Ba Airport
  - Bua - Bua Airport
  - Deuba - Pacific Harbour Airport
  - Korolevu - Korolevu Airport
  - Natadola - Natadola Airport
  - Ono-i-Lau - Ono-i-Lau Airport
  - Rabi - Rabi Airport
  - Saqani - Biaugunu Airport
  - Vatukoula - Vatukoula Airport
  - Wakaya Island - Wakaya Island Airport

== Fleet ==
The Air Fiji fleet included the following aircraft (at December 2008):

Air Fiji fleet
Aircraft	Total
Britten-Norman BN-2A Islander	1
Embraer EMB 110P2 Bandeirante	2
Harbin Y-12	2
Total	5

== Accidents and incidents ==
On 24 July 1999, Air Fiji Flight 121, an Embraer EMB 110 Bandeirante (registered DQ-AFN) operated a domestic flight from Suva to Nadi, crashed into a mountain near Delailasakau, killing all 17 occupants on board. The crash was caused by a drunk captain.
