= Northern Air (Fiji) =

Airline in Fiji

IATA	ICAO	Call sign
—	FJN	—
- Commenced operations: 2007
- Hubs: Nausori International Airport
- Secondary hubs: Nadi International Airport
- Fleet size: 6
- Destinations: 11
- Headquarters: Nausori International Airport, Suva, [iji
- Key people: Mr Rainjash San (chief executive)
- Website: www.northernair.com.fj

Northern Air Services Charters Limited is an airline operating both regularly scheduled flights and charter services from Nausori International Airport and other airports in Fiji. It took over some local routes no longer serviced by Pacific Sun, specifically to the Northern Division.

Northern Air introduced daily flights to Nadi from 1 April 2017 and were looking at buying ATR-42 series 300 aircraft.

== Destinations ==
The airline serves the following domestic destinations in Fiji:

- Gau
- Koro
- Labasa
- Laucala
- Levuka
- Moala
- Nadi
- Rotuma
- Savusavu
- Suva
- Taveuni

The airline also operates flights on behalf of the Fijian Navy.

== Fleet ==
Northern Air operates the following aircraft, as of November 2017:

Northern Air fleet
Aircraft	Total	Orders	Passengers
Britten-Norman Islander	2	0	8
Embraer 110 Bandeirante	4	0	18
