= Funafuti International Airport =

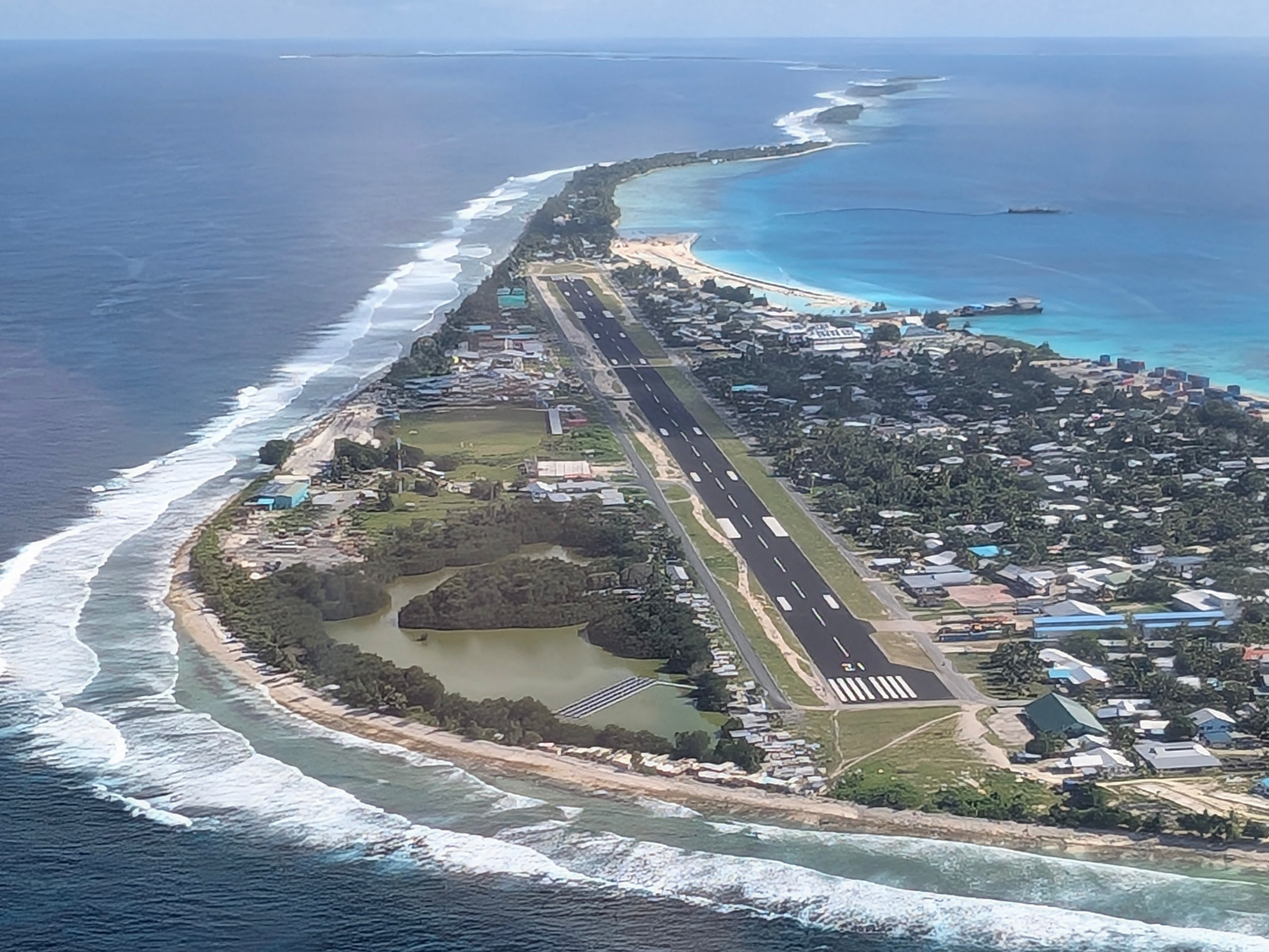
- Aerial view of Runway 21 in 2025
- IATA: FUN; ICAO: NGFU

Summary
- Airport type: Public
- Location: Funafuti Atoll, Tuvalu
- Elevation AMSL: 9 ft (2.7 m)
- Coordinates: 08°31′30″S 179°11′47″E

Map
- Location in Tuvalu

Runways
Direction	Length		Surface
Direction	m	ft	Surface
03/21	1,524	5,000	Asphalt

Funafuti International Airport (IATA: FUN, ICAO: NGFU) is an airport in Vaiaku on Funafuti, an atoll that serves as the capital of the island nation of Tuvalu. It is the sole international airport in Tuvalu. Fiji Airways operates between Suva, Nadi and Funafuti.

== History ==
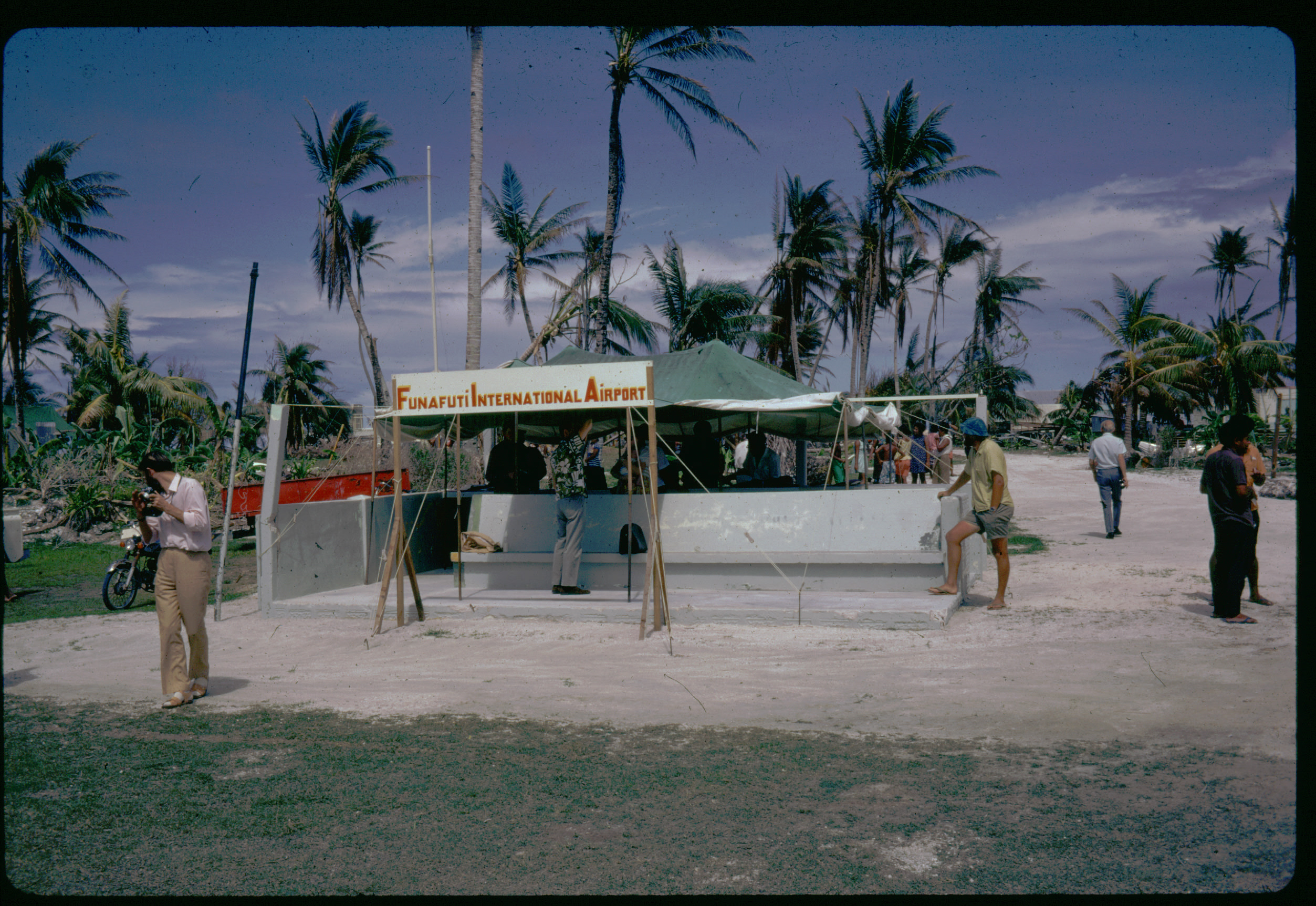
Funafuti Airport after Cyclone Bebe in November 1972.

Funafuti Airport was built by a Seabee detachment of the 2nd Naval Construction Battalion of the United States Navy in 1943 during World War II.

The military airfield included an airstrip, control tower and facilities, with a radio station at Tepuka, connected by cable to the airfield. The base headquarters buildings were at the present-day Teagai Apelu's residence, and a bunker is there to this day.

The first offensive operation was launched on 20 April 1943 when 22 B-24 Liberator aircraft from 371 and 372 Bombardment Squadrons bombed Nauru. The next day the Japanese made a predawn raid on the strip at Funafuti that destroyed one B-24 and caused damage to five other planes. On 22 April, 12 B-24 aircraft bombed Tarawa. Marine Fighting Squadron 441 (VMF-441), flying the F4F Wildcat, operated from Funafuti from May to September 1943.

The airfield became the headquarters of the United States Army Air Forces VII Bomber Command in November 1943, which directed operations against Japanese forces on Tarawa and other bases in the Gilbert Islands. The USAAF stationed two B-24 Liberator heavy bomber groups, the 11th Wing and 30th Bombardment Groups on Funafuti in the implementation of Operation Galvanic, which led to the Battle of Tarawa and the Battle of Makin in November 1943.

By the middle of 1944, as the fighting moved further north toward Japan, the Americans began to withdraw. By the time the Pacific War ended in 1945, nearly all of them, with their equipment, departed. After the war, the military airfield was developed into a commercial airport.

== Facilities ==
The airport is at an elevation of 9 feet (3 m) above mean sea level. It has one runway which is 1,524 metres (5,000 ft) in length. The absence of runway lighting, minimal VHF radio and air navigation equipment means that operations are restricted to daylight hours.

The runway was originally constructed using coral aggregate and has a sub-base layer of 8 cm thick coral gravel, surfaced with a 1–2 cm asphalt chip seal. It was resurfaced in 1992 and the runway was rated at 50 tonnes landing capacity; it was reduced to 20 tonnes landing capacity due to sub-surface water, deterioration of the sub-base and lack of surface maintenance. However, the runway was resurfaced in 2015 so that the pavement would be re-rated.

The deterioration of the runway's sub-base is a consequence of its low elevation and the hydrologic dynamics in the sub-surface of the atoll. There was extensive swamp reclamation during World War II to create the airfield. About half of Fongafale islet is reclaimed swamp that contains porous, highly permeable coral blocks that allow the tidal forcing of salt water through the sub-base of the runway. This results in salt water pooling on the runway during spring tides.

In 2011 World Bank and the government of Tuvalu agreed to commence the Tuvalu Aviation Investment Project (TvAIP) for the purpose of improving operational safety and oversight of international air transport and associated infrastructure at Funafuti International Airport. In November 2013 the World Bank approved US$6.06 million in finance for the TvAIP. Further World Bank funding was provided in 2017. TvAIP is intended to improve the runway so that it achieves a minimum pavement classification number (PCN) of 18 to provide a load-carrying capacity of the pavement that rates the runway for emergency flights. TvAIP also involved improvements of navigational aids and other safety and security facilities to meet International Civil Aviation Organization (ICAO) requirements. Tuvalu became the 192nd member of ICAO.

In 2018, Tuvalu opened a new international airport terminal.

The airport is somewhat unusual due to limited space on the island, the runway is used as a common area for sporting and social activities when not in use. A fire engine will activate its siren sound when a plane is landing, warning civilians to stay clear of the runway.

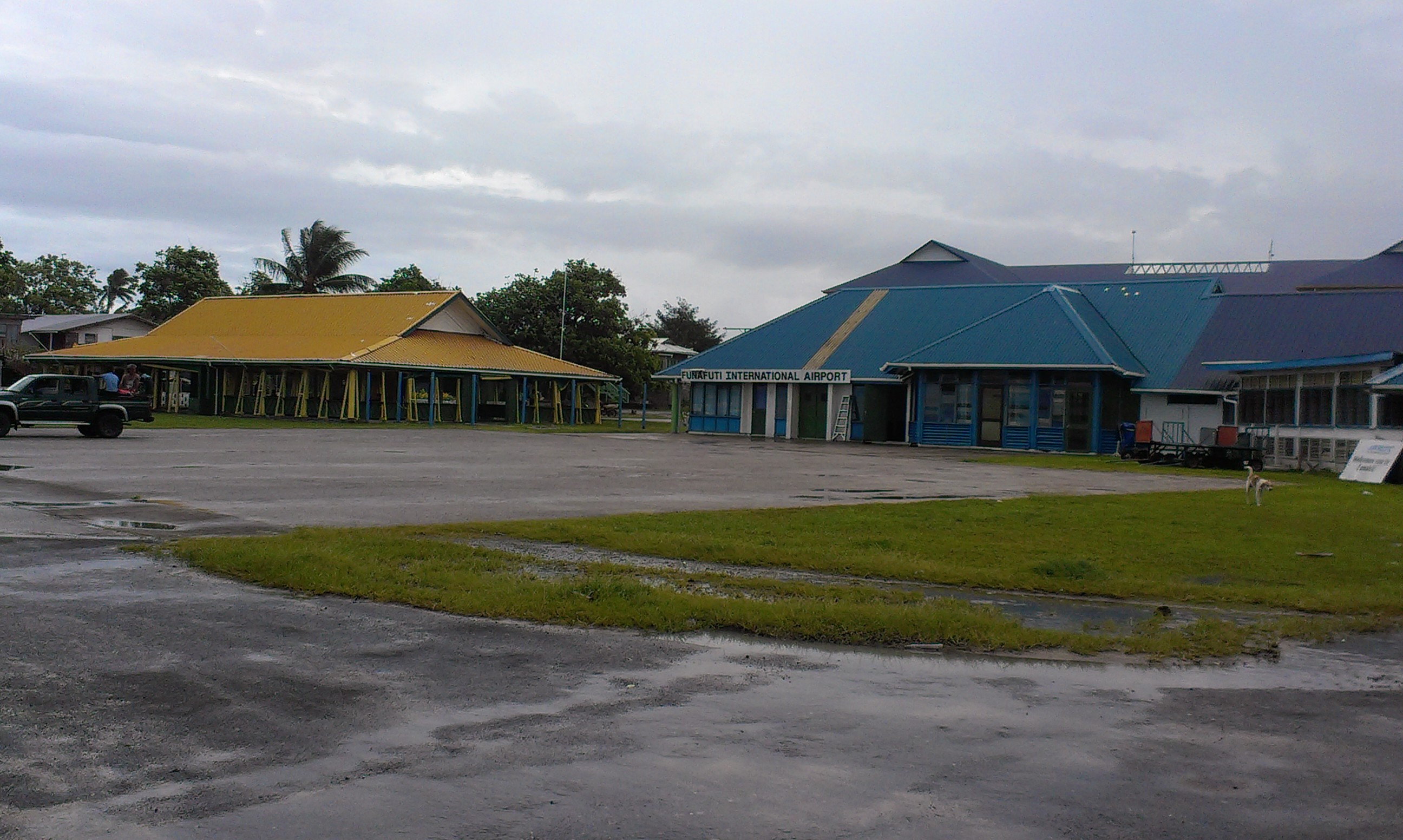
Maneapa and airport building

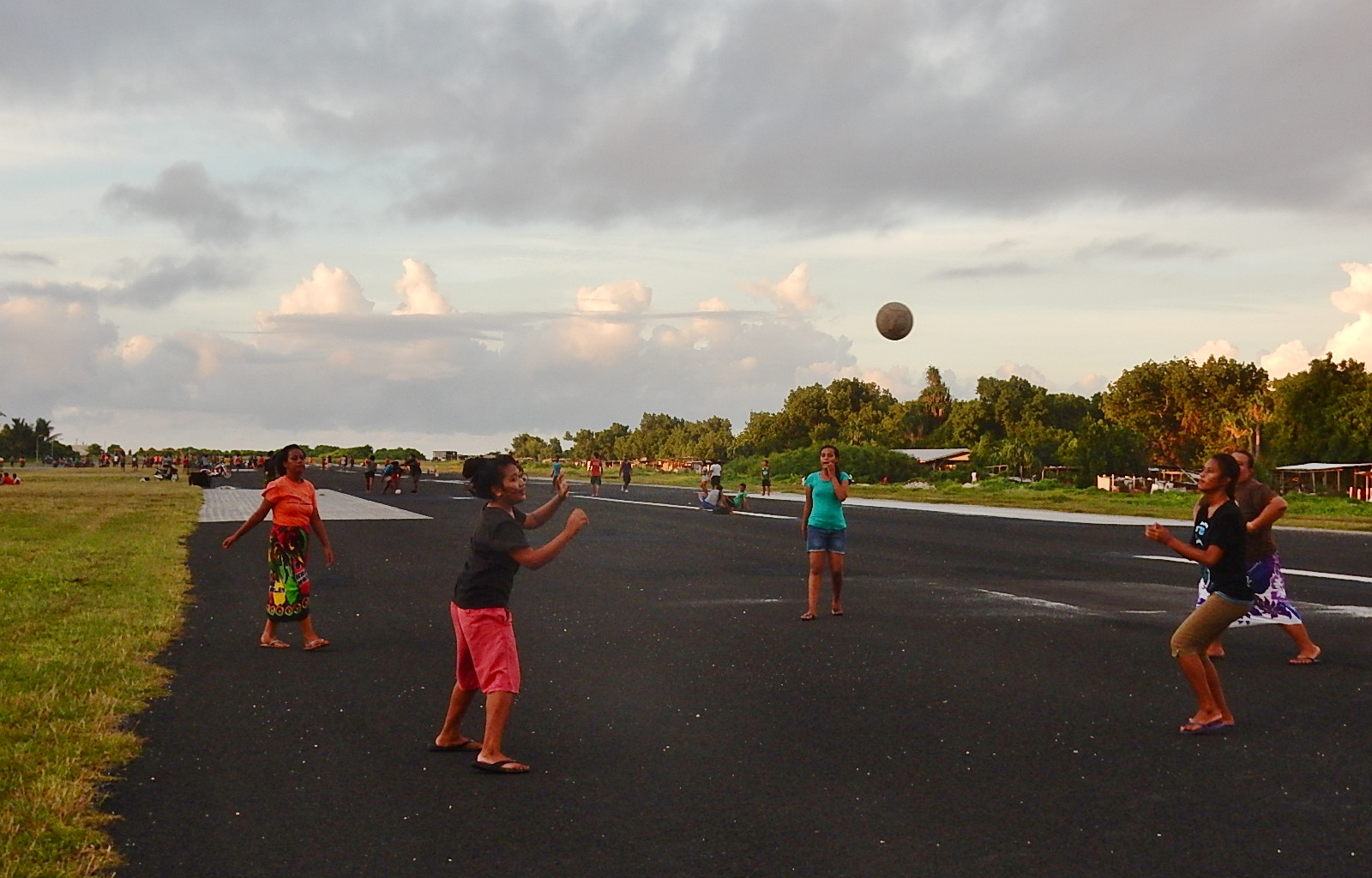
Girls playing volleyball on Funafuti airport

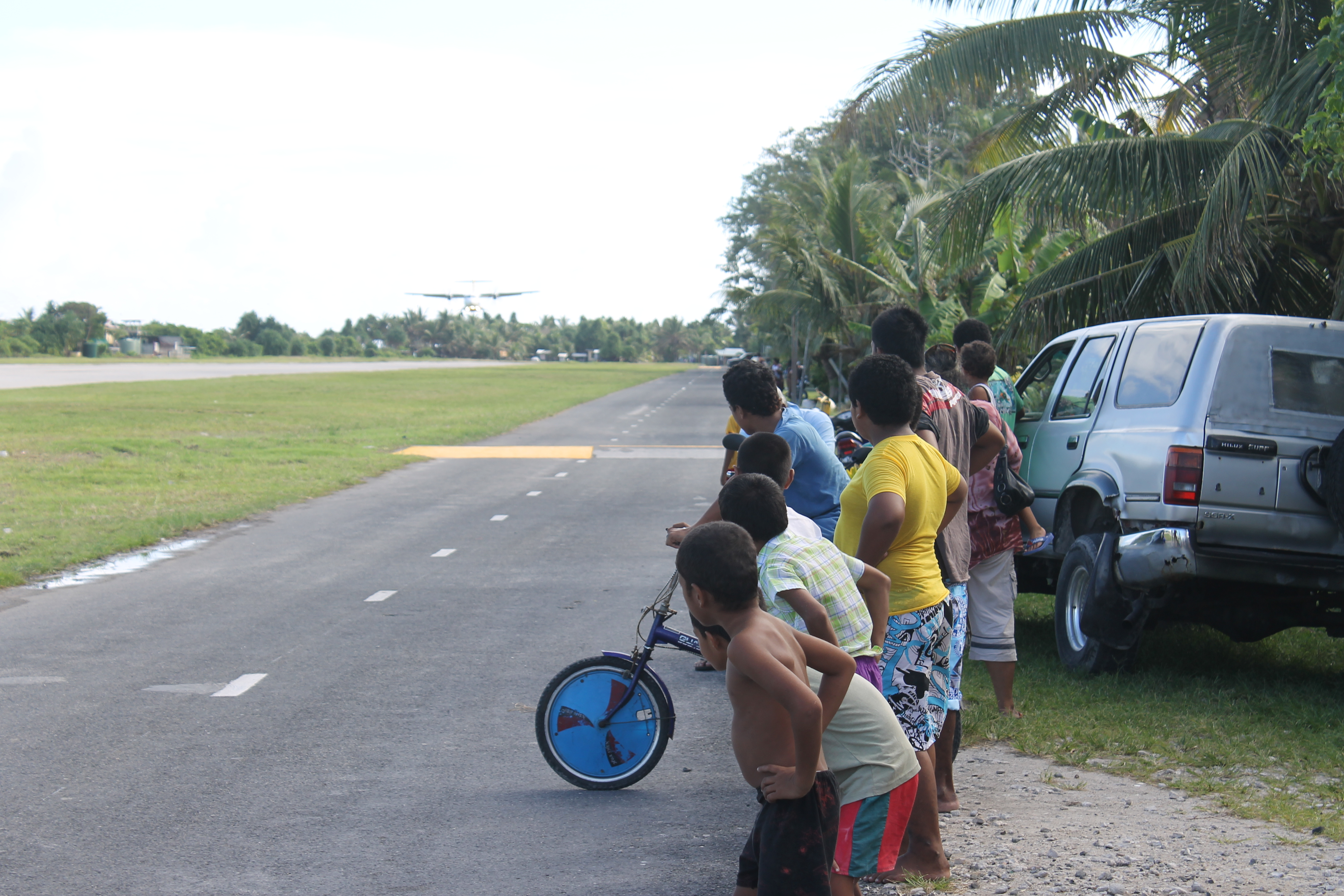
Tuvaluan children watching a plane land at Funafuti International Airport

== Airlines and destinations ==
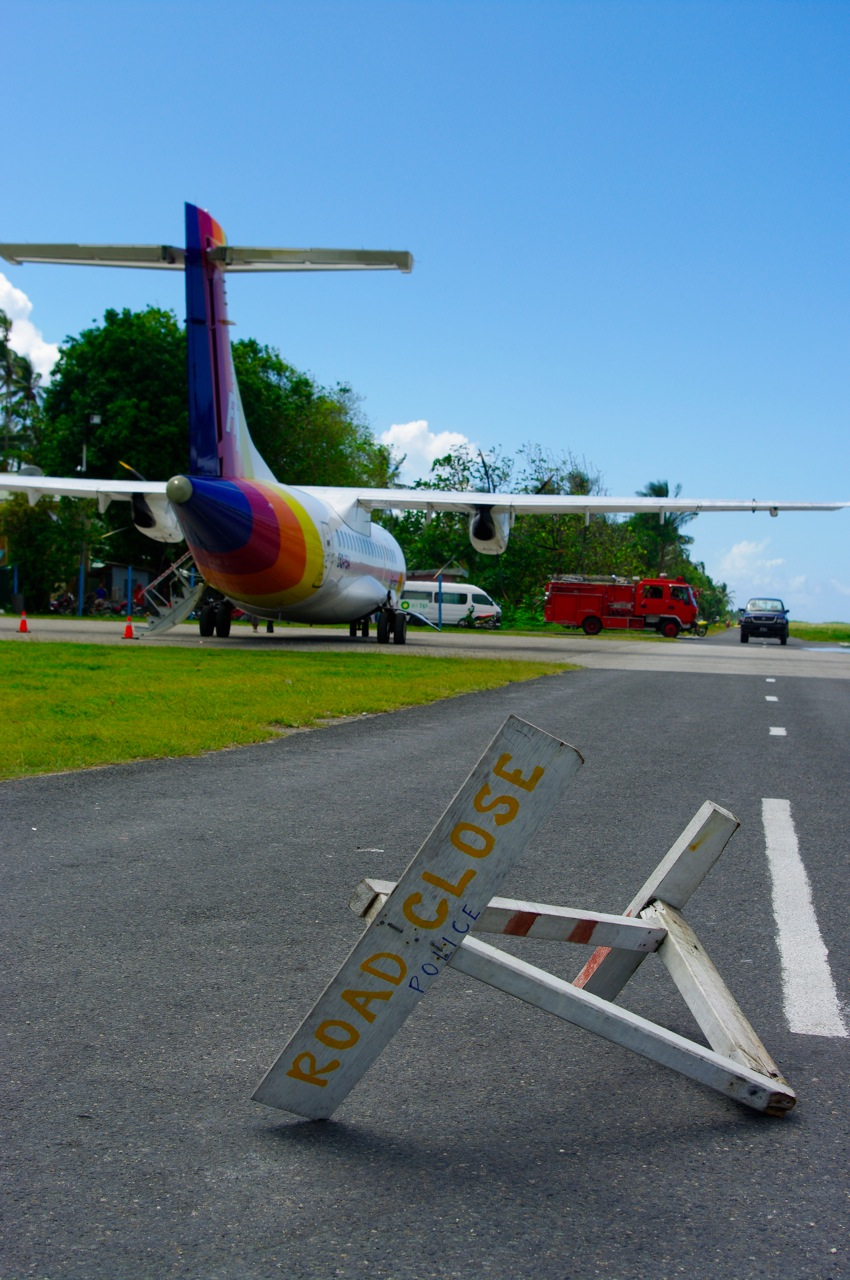
Fiji Link aircraft at Funafuti.

Fiji Airways operates services three times a week (Tuesday, Thursday and Saturday) between Suva and Funafuti and twice a week (Monday and Friday) between Nadi and Funafuti with ATR 72-600 aircraft, which has a capacity of up to 72 passengers.

Airlines	Destinations
Fiji Airways	Nadi, Suva

=== Historical services ===
Up to 1999 Air Marshall Islands operated a Hawker Siddeley HS 748 with a passenger load of 55.

In 2001 the government of Tuvalu purchased a share of Air Fiji, which provided Tuvalu with greater control of its airline access; however, Air Fiji ceased operations in 2009.

From 21 March 2018 to 21 September 2021, Air Kiribati operated one flight a week to Funafuti, using a Bombardier Dash 8 100 series aircraft, which carried up to 35 passengers.
