= KXF =

KXF or kxf may refer to:

- KXF, the IATA code for Koro Airport, Koro Island, Fiji
- kxf, the ISO 639-3 code for Manumanaw language, Burma and Thailand
