= Fiji Link =

Domestic airline of Fiji

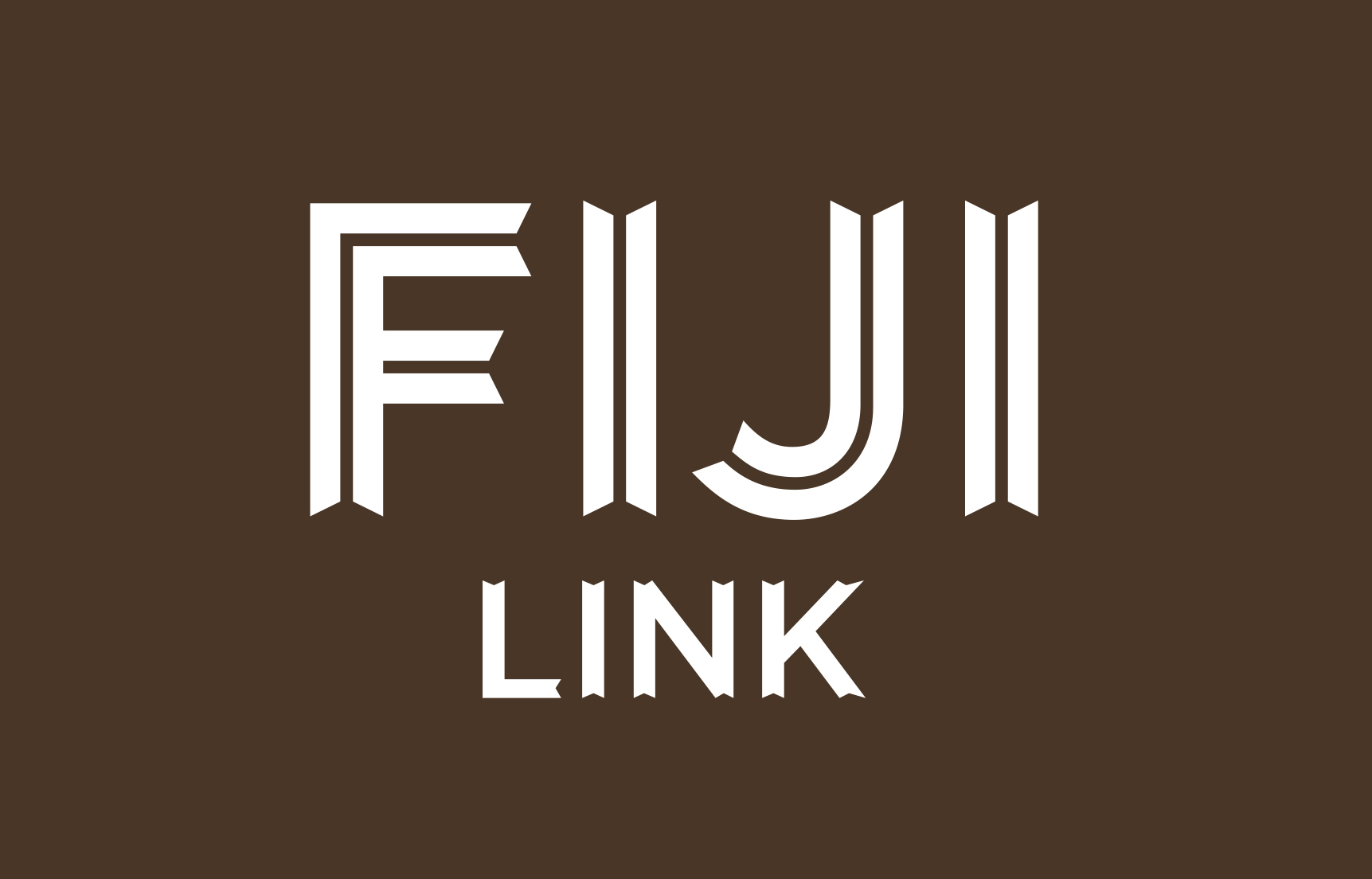

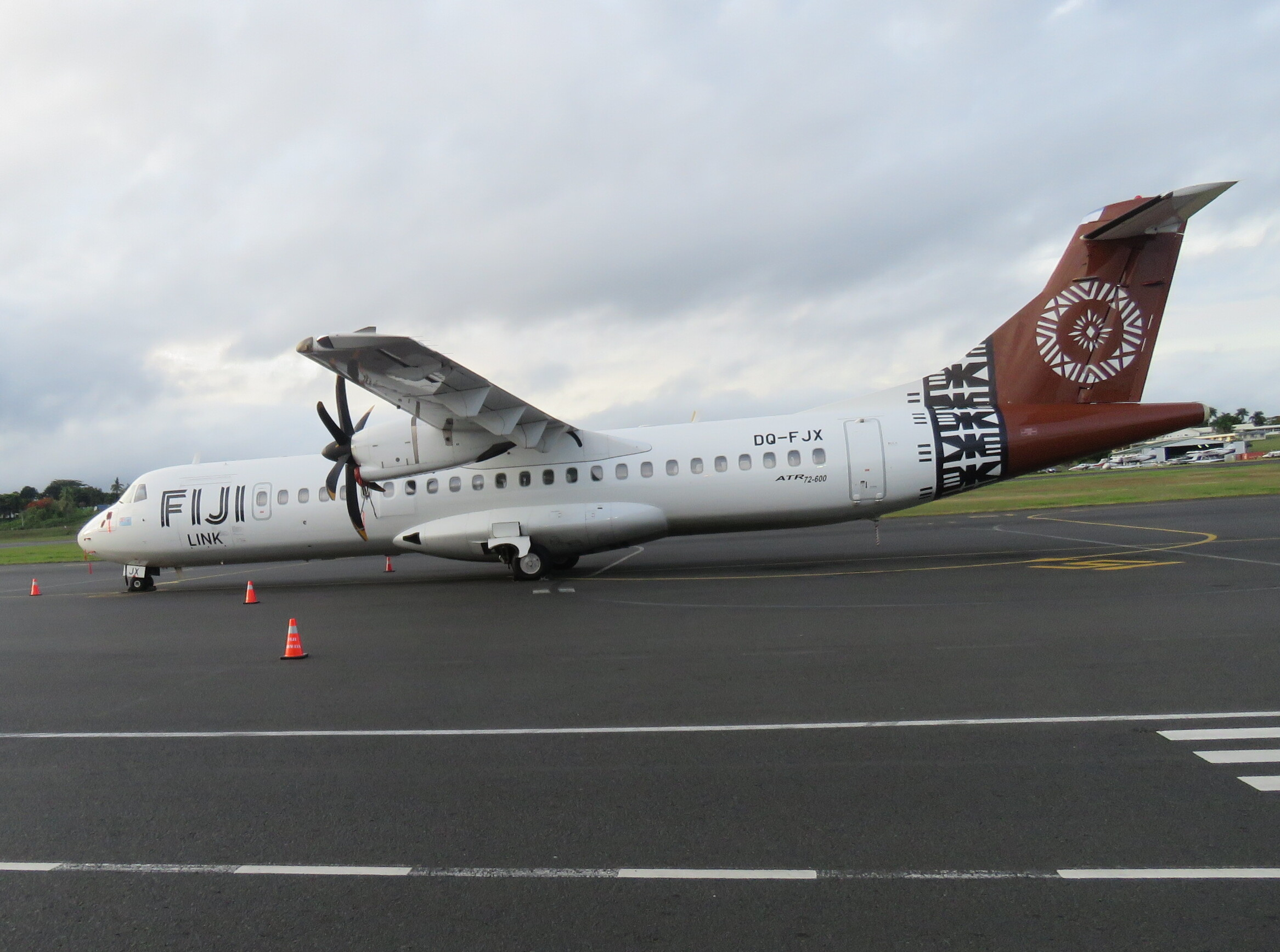
- Fiji Link ATR 72-600
IATA	ICAO	Call sign
FJ	FJA	LINK FIJI
- Founded: 1980; 46 years ago (as Sunflower Airlines)
- Commenced operations: 2006; 20 years ago
- Hubs: Nadi International Airport
- Secondary hubs: Nausori International Airport
- Alliance: Oneworld (affiliate)
- Fleet size: 10
- Destinations: 13 (see below)
- Parent company: Fiji Airways
- Headquarters: Nadi International Airport; Nadi, Fiji
- Key people: Shaenaz Voss (executive general manager)
- Website: www.fijiairways.com

Fiji Link is the trade name for Fiji Airlines Limited, which is a Fijian domestic airline and a wholly owned subsidiary of the international carrier Fiji Airways. It is headquartered at the Fiji Link office in the Civil Aviation Authority of Fiji (CAAFI) compound at Nadi International Airport in Nadi. It operates scheduled services to 11 destinations within the Fijian Islands as well as regionally within the Pacific Islands.

== History ==
Logo of former Sunflower Airlines

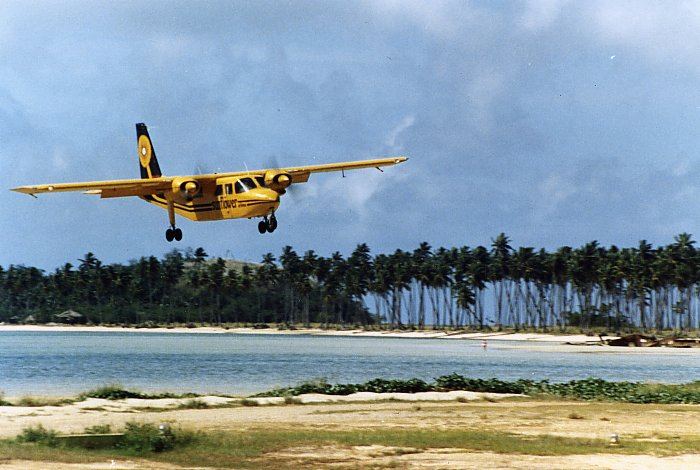
Sunflower Airlines Islander, landing on Malololailai, Fiji, 1986

Don Collingwood, a pilot and businessman, founded what became Pacific Sun in 1980, under the name Sunflower Airlines, which later changed to Sun Air. It began with a single Britten Norman BN2 Islander aircraft, flying the Nadi-Taveuni route. Other than the BN2 Islanders which remained the backbone of the fleet, the airline operated a wide range of piston and turboprop aircraft including the Beechcraft Baron, Beechcraft Queen Air, de Havilland Heron, Short 330, and de Havilland Canada DHC-6. By January 2007, before its official handover to Air Pacific, its fleet had grown to 12 aircraft, and the company employed nearly 140 staff.

On 31 January 2007, Sun Air was sold and handed over to current parent company Fiji Airways, formerly Air Pacific, which had to fight off a legal challenge against the handover by the now-defunct rival domestic carrier at the time, Air Fiji. Air Pacific then established the domestic airline as Fiji Airlines Limited, trading as Pacific Sun. The airline began operations with eight aircraft, including the introduction of two ATR 42–500 aircraft purchased used from Air Mauritius, along with three existing BN2 Islanders and three DHC-6s. However, the fleet was cut back to just four between December 2010 and June 2011 due to economic cost cutting, resulting in the withdrawal of the BN2 Islander fleet as well as one DHC-6. Two additional leased DHC-6s were added to the fleet during June 2011 to increase the Pacific Sun fleet to six aircraft.

On 26 November 2013, parent Fiji Airways announced Pacific Sun was to be rebranded as ‘Fiji Link’. Operations as Fiji Link commenced in June 2014.

== News ==
In late November 2010, Pacific Sun announced that due to current economical reasons, they were withdrawing their BN2 Islander fleet from service. This meant downsizing the Pacific Sun fleet from eight aircraft to just five.

In early December 2010, Pacific Sun announced the redundancy of 85 out of 210 employees. This included staff from administrative, support and operations areas as well as 15 pilots. Pacific Sun's general manager, Jim Samson, explained that continuing operating losses had resulted in management having to make some tough decisions.

"Pacific Sun has lost, on average, $6 million per year over the last three years. Continued losses are unsustainable. Regrettably as a result, we have no alternative but to restructure the airline in order to ensure its viability and success going forward," he said.

Air Pacific chief executive officer and Pacific Sun board member David Pflieger said since Air Pacific's takeover in 2007, Pacific Sun had accumulated $18.5 million in losses. Air Pacific had loaned $44 million to purchase Sun Air's certificate and operations and two ATR 42 aircraft.

In November 2013, Fiji Airways held a competition to rename Pacific Sun. On 13 November, the competition closed with the most votes going to Fiji Link. On 26 November, Fiji Airways released the new name. The new livery was also announced. Operations as Fiji Link commenced in June 2014.

== Destinations ==
As of August 2022, Fiji Link operates scheduled services to the following 11 domestic destinations and two international destinations to Tonga and Tuvalu.

Country / territory	City	Airport	Notes
Fiji	Cicia	Cicia Airport	
Fiji	Kadavu	Kadavu Airport	
Fiji	Koro	Koro Airport	
Fiji	Labasa	Labasa Airport	
Fiji	Lakeba	Lakeba Airport	
Fiji	Laucala	Laucala Airport	Terminated
Fiji	Malolo Lailai	Malolo Lailai Airport	Terminated
Fiji	Mana Island	Mana Island Airport	Terminated
Fiji	Nadi	Nadi International Airport	Hub
Fiji	Rotuma	Rotuma Airport	
Fiji	Savusavu	Savusavu Airport	
Fiji	Suva	Nausori International Airport	Secondary hub
Fiji	Taveuni	Matei Airport	
Fiji	Vanua Balavu	Vanuabalavu Airport	
Fiji	Yasawa	Yasawa Island Airport	Terminated
Tonga	Neiafu	Vava'u International Airport	
Tuvalu	Funafuti	Funafuti International Airport	

== Fleet ==
As of July 2026, Fiji Link operates the following aircraft:

Aircraft	In fleet	Orders	Passengers			Notes
Aircraft	In fleet	Orders	J	Y	Total	Notes
ATR 42-600	1	—	—	48	48	
ATR 72-600	5		5	64	68	Used for regional and domestic flights.
Viking Air DHC-6-400 Twin Otter	4	—	—	19	19	
Total	10					

=== Fleet development ===
In August 2024, Nordic Aviation Capital (NAC) has signed a lease agreement for three ATR 72-600s with Fiji Airways. The aircraft are from NAC’s existing orderbook with ATR.

=== Former fleet ===
As of August 2025, Fiji Link operated 1 ATR 42-500, 5 ATR 72-600 and 4 Twin Otters.
