= Vunisea Airport =

Airport in Fiji

- IATA: KDV; ICAO: NFKD

Summary
- Airport type: Public
- Operator: Airports Fiji Limited
- Location: Vunisea, Kadavu Island, Fiji
- Elevation AMSL: 6 ft (1.8 m)
- Coordinates: 19°03′29″S 178°09′25″E

Map
- Location of airport in Fiji

Runways
Direction	Length		Surface
Direction	m	ft	Surface
16/34	915	3,000	asphalt

Vunisea Airport (IATA: KDV, ICAO: NFKD) is an airport located near Vunisea (Namalata) on Kadavu Island in Fiji. Also known as Namalata Airport or Kadavu Airport, it serves many tourists surfing and kayaking in Fiji. It is operated by Airports Fiji Limited.

== Facilities ==
The airport resides at an elevation of 6 feet (2 m) above mean sea level. It has one runway which is 916 metres (3,005 ft).

== Airlines and destinations ==
Fiji Link connects Vunisea Airport to Nadi International Airport and Nausori International Airport (Suva).
