= Labasa Airport =

Airport in Fiji

Labasa Airport Rara ni waqavuka labasa (Fijian) لباسا ہوائی اڈہ (Urdu)
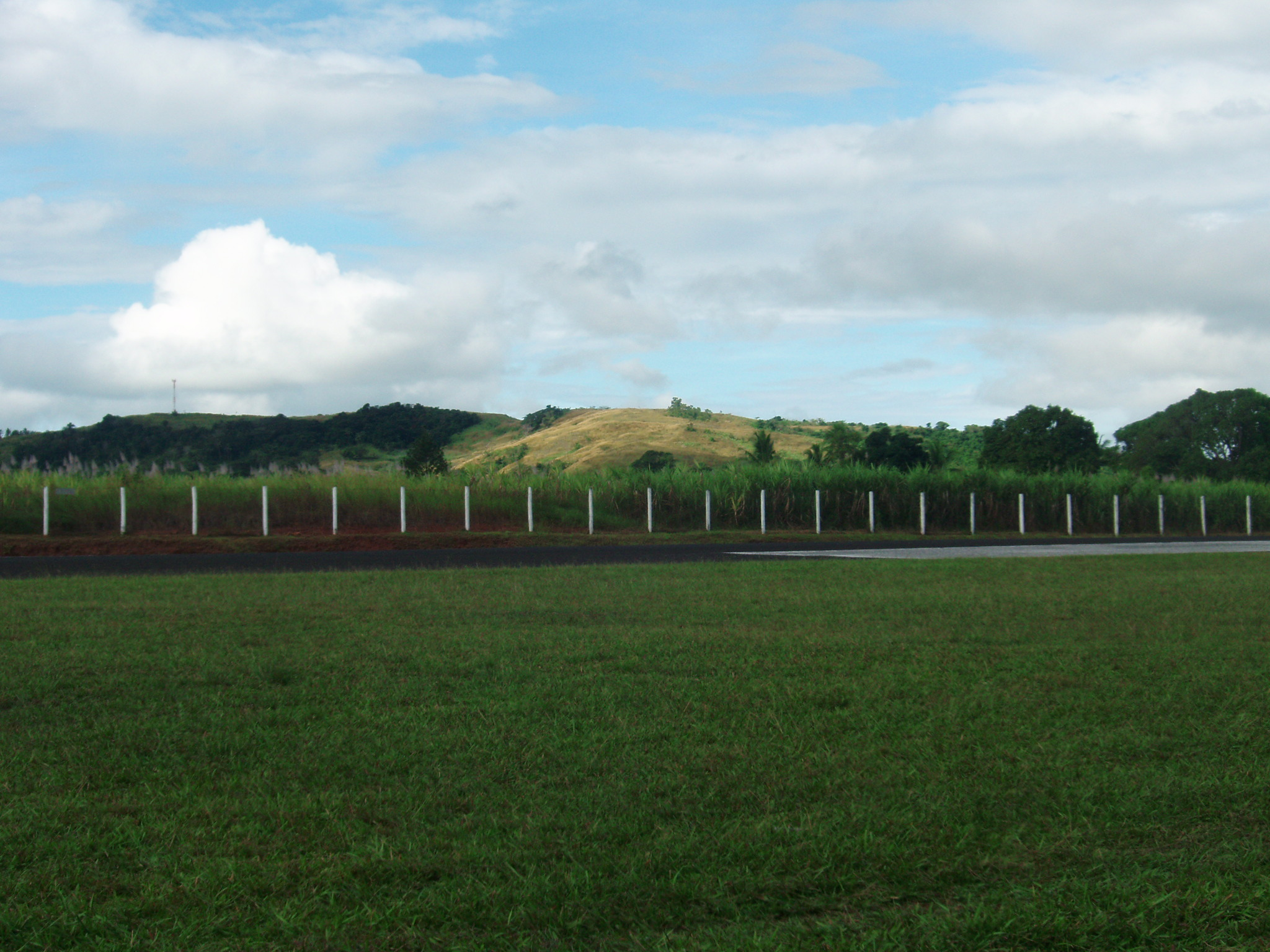
- IATA: LBS; ICAO: NFNL

Summary
- Airport type: Public
- Operator: Airports Fiji Limited
- Serves: Labasa, Vanua Levu, Fiji
- Elevation AMSL: 44 ft (13 m)
- Coordinates: 16°28′00″S 179°20′23″E

Map
- Location of airport in Fiji

Runways
Direction	Length		Surface
Direction	m	ft	Surface
13/31	1,073	3,521	Asphalt
- Source: DAFIF

Labasa Airport (IATA: LBS, ICAO: NFNL) is an airport serving Labasa (pronounced [lamˈbasa]) is a town located in Macuata Province, in the northeastern part of the island of Vanua Levu in Fiji. It is operated by Airports Fiji Limited.

== Facilities ==
The airport resides at an elevation of 44 feet (13 m) above mean sea level. It has one runway designated 13/31 with an asphalt surface measuring 1,073 by 30 metres (3,520 ft × 98 ft).

== Airlines and destinations ==
Labasa Airport is connected to Nausori International Airport (Suva) by Fiji Link and Northern Air, and to Nadi International Airport by Fiji Link.
