= Rotuma Airport =

Airport in Else'e, Malhaha, Fiji

Rotuma Airport Rara ni Waqavuka ni Rotuma
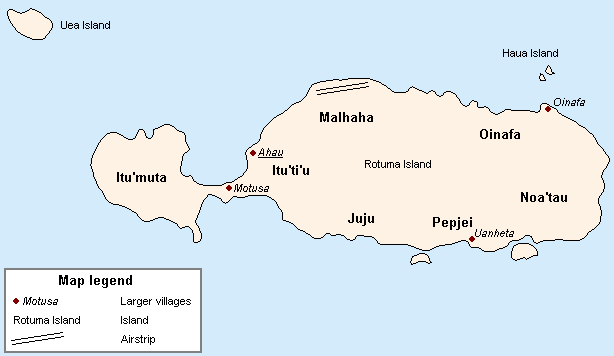
- Map of Rotuma showing location of airstrip
- IATA: RTA; ICAO: NFNR

Summary
- Airport type: Public
- Operator: Airports Fiji Limited
- Serves: Rotuma Island, Fiji
- Location: Else'e, Malhaha
- Elevation AMSL: 42 ft (13 m)
- Coordinates: 12°28′57″S 177°04′16″E

Map
- Location of airport in Fiji

Runways
| Direction | Length | | Surface |
| Direction | m | ft | Surface |
|---|---|---|---|
| 07/25 | 1,494 | 4,902 | Asphalt |

Rotuma Airport (IATA: RTA, ICAO: NFNR) is an airport serving the island of Rotuma in Fiji. It is located near Else'e, a village in the district of Malhaha. It is operated by Airports Fiji Limited. An upgrade which saw Rotuma Airport's runway sealed was opened in 2018 to allow flights on larger ATR 72-600 aircraft operated by Fiji Link replacing the smaller de Havilland Twin Otter aircraft on its service to Nadi International Airport.

== Facilities ==
The airport resides at an elevation of 22 feet (7 m) above mean sea level. It has one runway which is 1,494 metres (4,902 ft) in length.

== Airlines and destinations ==
Rotuma Airport is connected to Nausori International Airport (Suva) by Fiji Link and Northern Air, and to Nadi International Airport by Fiji Link.
