= Gau Airport =

Airport in Fiji

- IATA: NGI; ICAO: NFNG

Summary
- Airport type: Public
- Operator: Airports Fiji Limited
- Serves: Gau Island, Fiji
- Elevation AMSL: 50 ft (15 m)
- Coordinates: 18°06′56″S 179°20′23″E

Map
- Location of airport in Fiji

Runways
| Direction | Length | | Surface |
| Direction | m | ft | Surface |
|---|---|---|---|
| | 754 | 2,474 |

Gau Airport (IATA: NGI, ICAO: NFNG) is an airport on Gau Island, one of the Lomaiviti Islands in Fiji. It is operated by Airports Fiji Limited.

== Facilities ==
The airport is at an elevation of 50 feet (15 m) above mean sea level. It has one runway which is 754 metres (2,474 ft) in length.

== Airlines and destinations ==
Northern Air connects Gau Airport to Nausori International Airport (Suva).
