= Levuka Airfield =

Airfield in Ovalau, Fiji

Levuka Airfield Bureta Airfield
- IATA: LEV; ICAO: NFNB

Summary
- Airport type: Public
- Operator: Airports Fiji Limited
- Serves: Levuka, Ovalau Island, Fiji
- Elevation AMSL: 11 ft (3.4 m)
- Coordinates: 17°42′40″S 178°45′31″E

Map
- Location of the airport in the Fiji Islands

Runways
Direction	Length		Surface
Direction	m	ft	Surface
08/26	640	2,100	Gravel

Levuka Airfield (IATA: LEV, ICAO: NFNB) is an airport on the island of Ovalau, one of the Lomaiviti Islands in Fiji. Also well known as Bureta Airport, it is located 22 kilometres (14 mi) from the town of Levuka. and operated by Airports Fiji Limited.

== Facilities ==
The airport is at an elevation of 11 feet (3 m) above mean sea level. It has a single gravel runway which is 640 metres (2,100 ft) in length and numbered 08 - 26.

== Airlines and destinations ==
Northern Air connects Levuka Airfield to Nausori International Airport (Suva).
