= Moala Airport =

Airport serving Moala Island, Fiji

- IATA: MFJ; ICAO: NFMO

Summary
- Airport type: Public
- Operator: Airports Fiji Limited
- Serves: Moala Island, Fiji
- Elevation AMSL: 13 ft (4.0 m)
- Coordinates: 18°34′01″S 179°57′04″E

Map
- Location of airport in Fiji

Runways
Direction	Length		Surface
Direction	m	ft	Surface
	579	1,900	grass

Moala Airport (IATA: MFJ, ICAO: NFMO) is an airport serving Moala, the main island of the Moala Islands, a subgroup of the Lau Islands in Fiji. It is operated by Airports Fiji Limited.

== Facilities ==
The airport resides at an elevation of 13 feet (4 m) above mean sea level. It has one runway which is 579 metres (1,900 ft) in length.

== Airlines and destinations ==
Northern Air connects Moala Airport to Nausori International Airport (Suva).
