= Vanuabalavu Airport =

Airport in Fiji

- IATA: VBV; ICAO: NFVB

Summary
- Airport type: Public
- Operator: Airports Fiji Limited
- Serves: Vanua Balavu, Fiji
- Coordinates: 17°14′41.5″S 178°57′33.5″W

Map
- Location of airport in Fiji

Vanuabalavu Airport or Vanua Balavu Airport (IATA: VBV, ICAO: NFVB) is an airport serving Vanua Balavu, the second largest of the Lau Islands in Fiji. It is operated by Airports Fiji Limited.

== Airlines and destinations ==
Fiji Link connects Vanuabalavu Airport to Nausori International Airport (Suva).
