= Cicia Airport =

Airport in Fiji

- IATA: ICI; ICAO: NFCI

Summary
- Airport type: Public
- Operator: Airports Fiji Limited
- Serves: Cicia, Lau Islands, Eastern Division, Fiji
- Elevation AMSL: 4 m (13 ft)
- Coordinates: 17°44′35″S 179°20′31″W

Map
- Location of the airport in Fiji

Runways
Direction	Length		Surface
Direction	ft	m	Surface
	2,500	762
- Source: GCM, STV

Cicia Airport (IATA: ICI, ICAO: NFCI) is an airport serving Cicia, one of the Lau Islands in the Eastern Division of Fiji. It is operated by Airports Fiji Limited.

== Facilities ==
The airport resides at an elevation of 13 feet (4 m) above mean sea level. It has one runway which measures 762 metres (2,500 ft) in length.

== Airlines and destinations ==
Fiji Link connects Cicia Airport to Nausori International Airport (Suva).
