= Nausori International Airport =

Airport in Suva, Fiji

Nausori International Airport Rara ni Waqavuka na Nausori नसौरी अंतर्राष्ट्रीय हवाई अड्डा
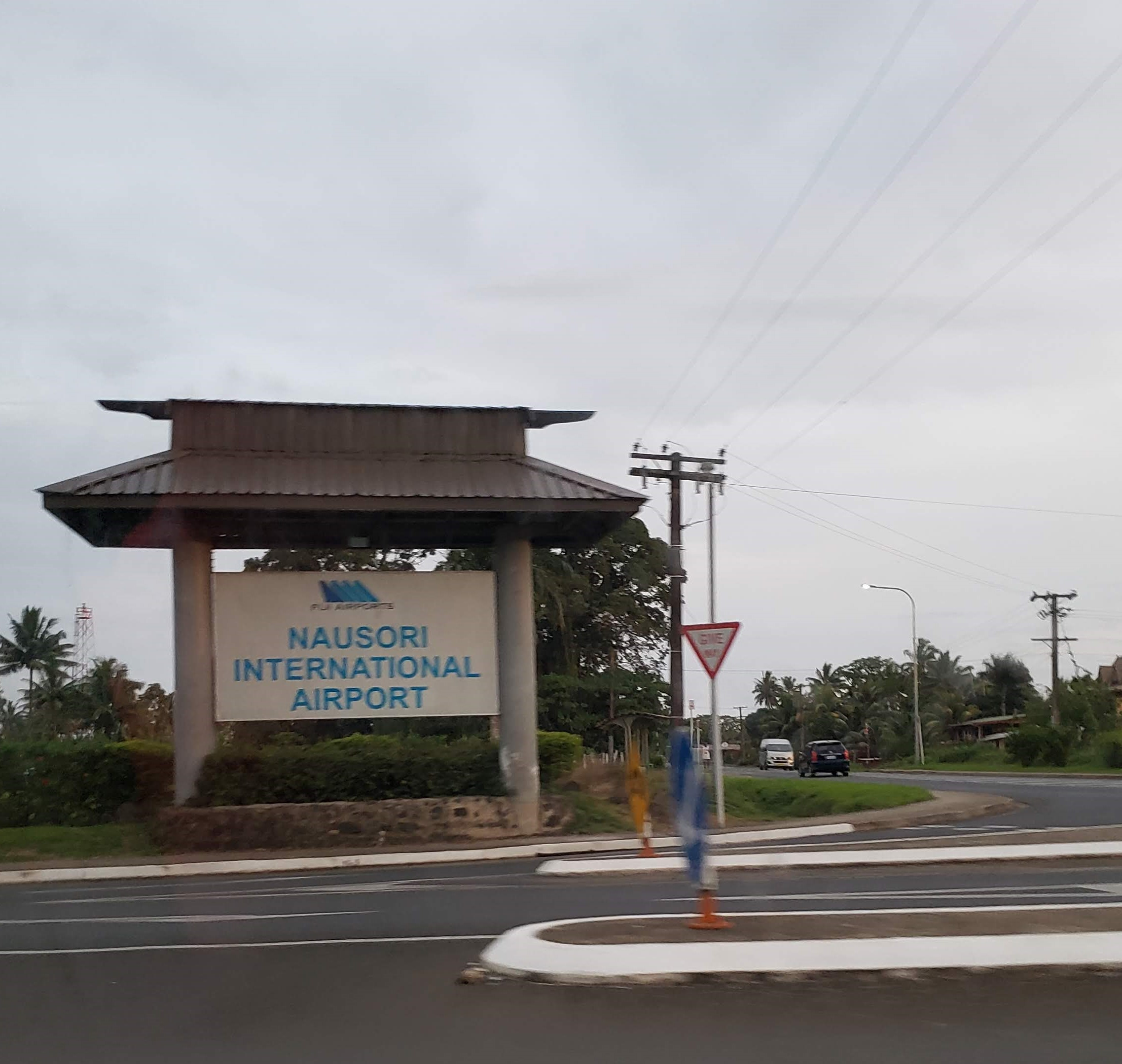
- IATA: SUV; ICAO: NFNA

Summary
- Airport type: Public
- Operator: Airports Fiji Limited (AFL)
- Serves: Suva
- Location: Nausori, Central Division, Viti Levu, Fiji
- Hub for: Fiji Airways; Fiji Link; Northern Air
- Elevation AMSL: 5 m (16 ft)
- Coordinates: 18°02′36″S 178°33′33″E

Map
- Location of airport in Fiji SUV/NFNA (Oceania)

Runways
Direction	Length		Surface
Direction	m	ft	Surface
10/28	2,148	7,047	Asphalt

Statistics (2019)
- Total passengers: 366,506
- International passengers: 37,394
- Domestic passengers: 329,112
- Source: Airports Fiji Limited (AFL)

Nausori International Airport (IATA: SUV, ICAO: NFNA), also known as Luvuluvu, is the secondary international airport in Fiji, behind Nadi International Airport. It is situated in Nausori on the southeastern side of Viti Levu, Fiji's main island. Nausori Airport is roughly 23 km (14 mi) (approximately a 45-minute drive) from Fiji's capital city, Suva. It was first constructed by U.S. Navy Seabees in 1942.

As of 2018, a 20-year master plan was under preparation for Nausori Airport, expected to include a complete refurbishment and upgrade of the airport, creating a facility for the international passengers and a domestic hub for Fiji.

At one time Air Pacific (now Fiji Airways) had its headquarters on the property of the airport. A $60 million project to extend the runway to 2,148 m and widen it was completed in 2021.

== Airlines and destinations ==
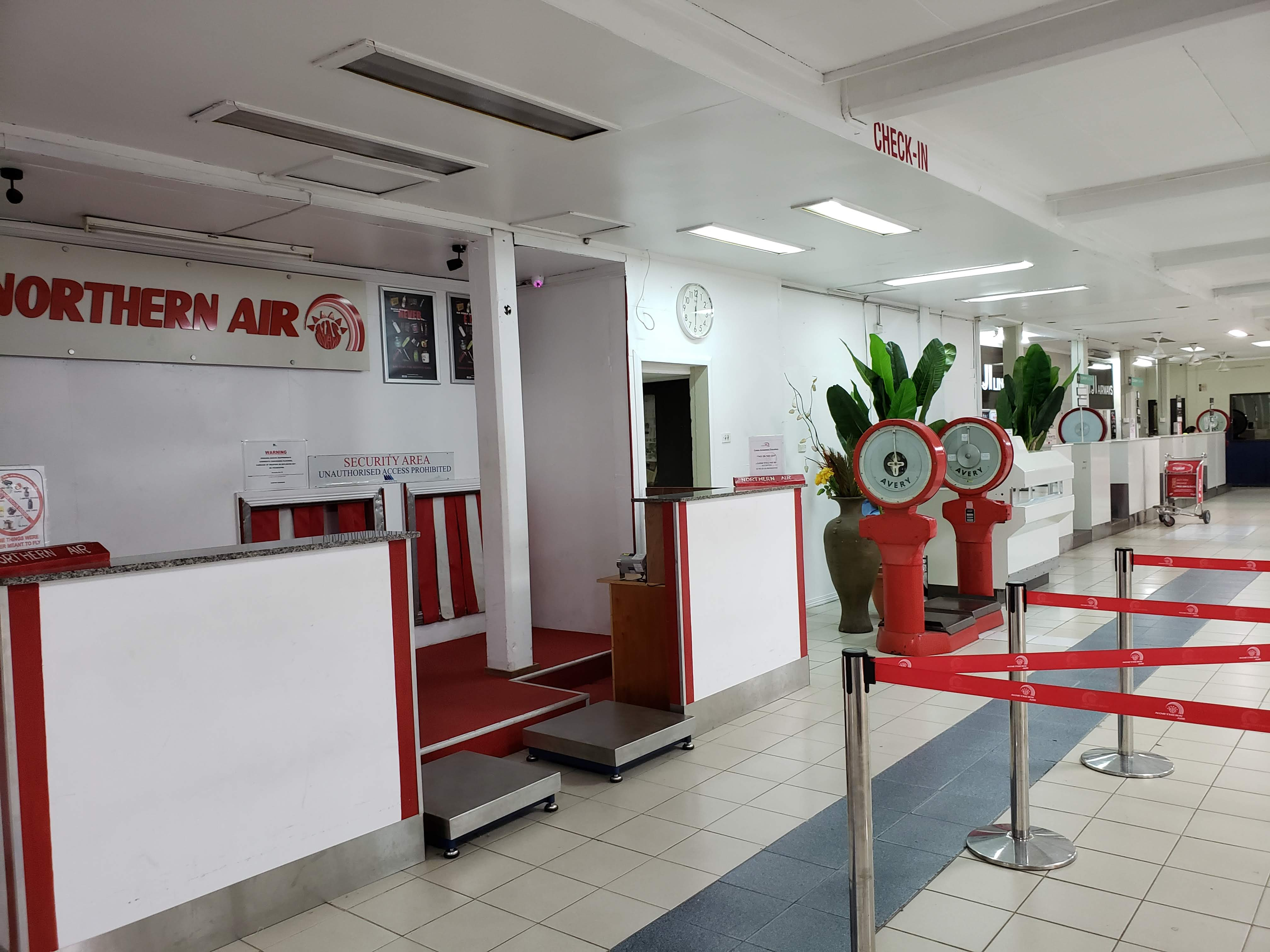
Check-in area at the airport

Airlines	Destinations
Fiji Link	Cicia, Funafuti, Kadavu, Koro, Labasa, Lakeba, Nadi, Rotuma, Savusavu, Taveuni, Vanua Balavu, Vunisea
Nauru Airlines	Nauru
Northern Air	Gau, Koro, Labasa, Levuka, Moala, Rotuma, Savusavu, Taveuni

If passengers want to fly internationally from this airport, they will need to transit through Nadi to get to other international destinations.
