= Fiji Airways =

Airline of Fiji

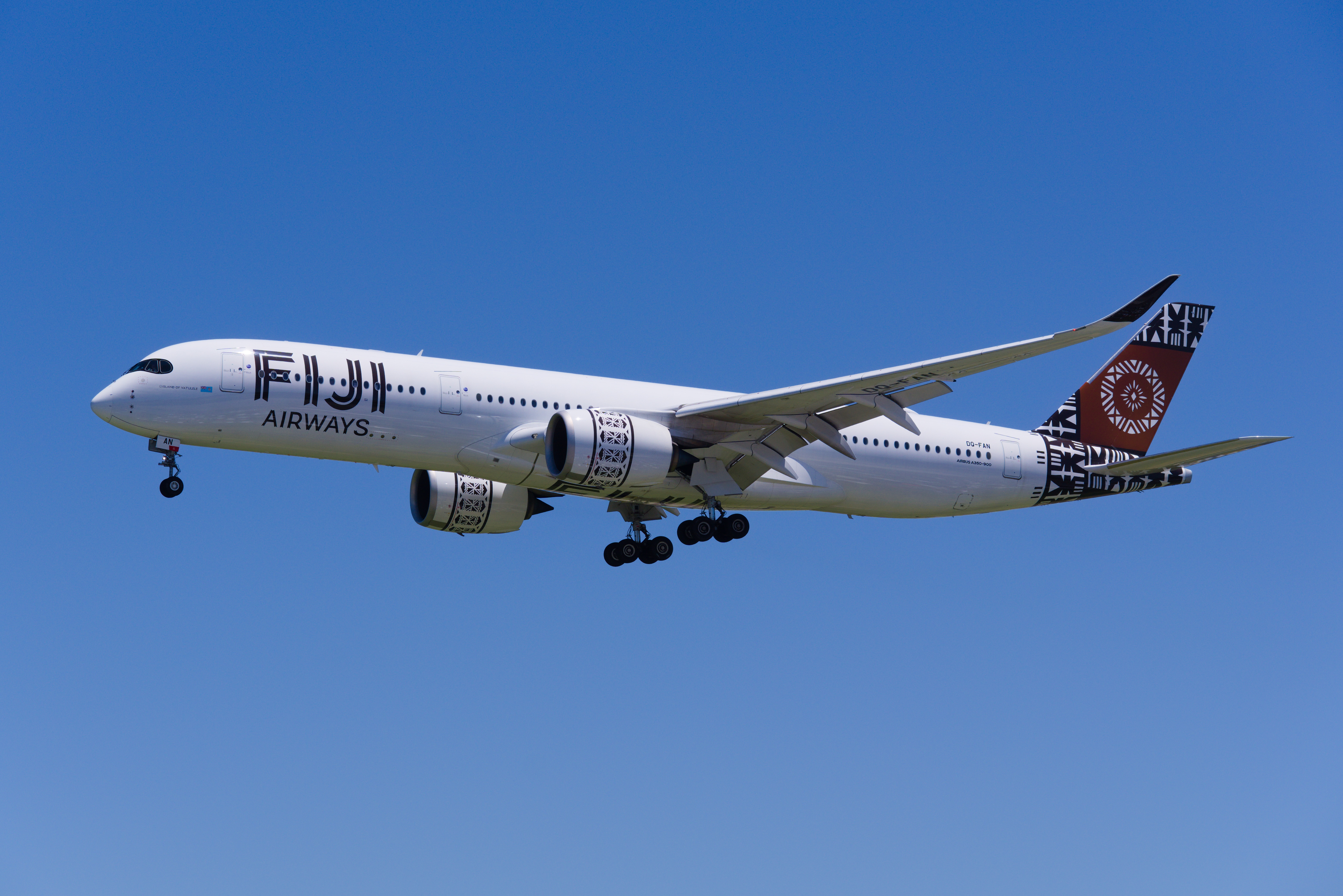
- Fiji Airways Airbus A350-900
IATA	ICAO	Call sign
FJ	FJI	FIJI
- Founded: 1947; 79 years ago
- Commenced operations: 1 September 1951; 75 years ago
- Hubs: Nadi International Airport
- Secondary hubs: Nausori International Airport
- Frequent-flyer program: AAdvantage
- Alliance: Oneworld
- Subsidiaries: Fiji Link
- Fleet size: 14
- Destinations: 28
- Parent company: Government of Fiji (50%); Fiji National Provident Fund (30%); Qantas (16%); Air New Zealand (4%)
- Headquarters: Nadi International Airport, Nadi, Fiji
- Key people: Paul Scurrah (managing director & CEO); Rajesh Punja (chairman)
- Website: www.fijiairways.com

Fiji Airways, formerly Air Pacific, is the flag carrier of Fiji. It operates international services from its hubs in Fiji to 27 destinations, and has an extended network of 108 international destinations through its codeshare partners, including Qantas, who also own a stake in the airline. The airline has been a full member of the Oneworld alliance since 2026.

The first commercial flight as Fiji Airways was made in 1951, but the airline's origins date back to the formation of Katafaga Estates Ltd. in 1947. After being acquired by Qantas in 1958, Katafaga Estates was retooled as a regional airline and renamed Air Pacific. In May 2012, MD/CEO David Pflieger announced that as the final part of the airline's successful turnaround, the airline would be returning to its former name of Fiji Airways to reinforce its role as the national airline of Fiji. The Fiji government owns 50% of the airline, the Fiji National Provident Fund (FNPF) owns 30% and Qantas 16%, diluted from its previous 46% stake after FNPF purchased their stake in Fiji Airways to raise capital during the COVID-19 pandemic, with the governments of several Pacific island nations holding the remainder.

The airline currently operates a fleet of Boeing 737 MAX 8 aircraft for short-haul flights, Airbus A330 family aircraft for medium-haul flights, and Airbus A350-900 aircraft for long-haul flights. Through its Fiji Link brand, the airline operates a fleet of DHC-6 Twin Otter and ATR 42 and ATR 72 aircraft for domestic flights within Fiji.

== History ==
=== Origins ===
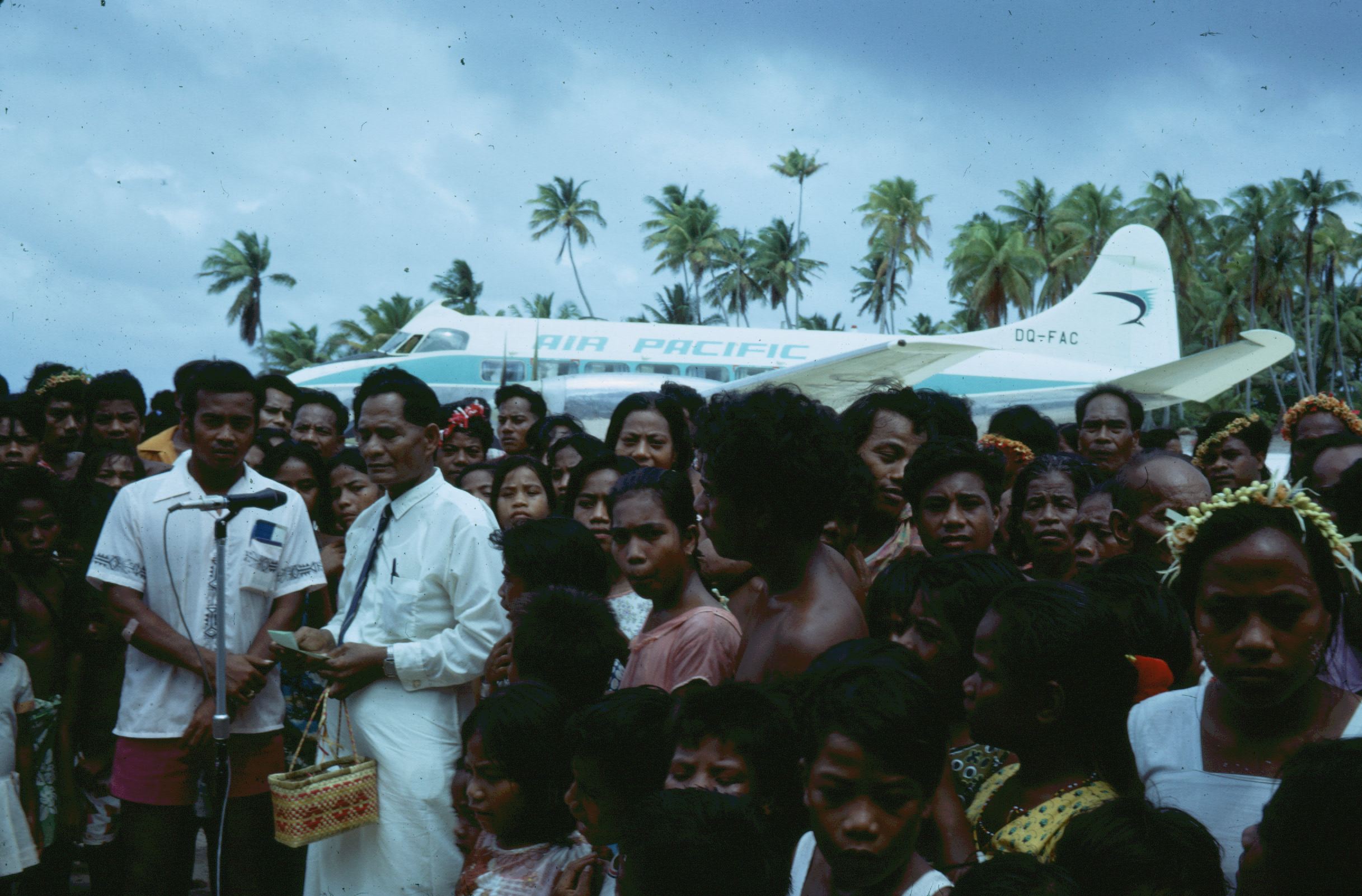
Air Pacific de Havilland Heron on its inaugural flight into Marakei Airport, Kiribati

The airline was founded by Australian aviator Harold Gatty who in 1931 had been the navigator on a record-breaking round-the-world flight with Wiley Post. Gatty moved to Fiji after World War II and registered the airline in 1947 as Katafaga Estates Ltd., after the coconut estate Gatty had established on Fiji's eastern island group. Gatty renamed the airline as Fiji Airways in September 1951. The New Zealander Fred Ladd was Fiji Airways' first Chief Pilot.

=== Flight history ===
Fiji Airways' inaugural flight was on 1 September 1951, when a seven-seater de Havilland Dragon Rapide biplane departed Suva's Nausori Airport for Drasa Airport near Lautoka, on the west coast of the main island. The airline's first international flight to Brisbane, Australia was on 1 June 1973. In 1983, the airline started flights to the US with a route to Honolulu called "Project America". In December 2009, Air Pacific commenced a twice-weekly service to Hong Kong from Nadi, which was increased to three services in January 2014. In July 2010, Air Pacific announced a new Suva-Auckland service, which was discontinued in 2020.

=== Air Pacific ===
After Gatty's death in 1958, Fiji Airways was acquired by Qantas. Initially, Qantas tried to create international support for a multinational, shared, regional airline. By 1966, Fiji Airways's shareholders included the governments of Tonga, Western Samoa, Nauru, Kiribati and the Solomon Islands. By 1968, Qantas, Air New Zealand, British Overseas Airways Corporation and the Fiji government held equal shareholdings.

After Fiji gained independence from Great Britain in 1970, the new national government began buying shares and the airline was renamed Air Pacific to reflect its regional presence.

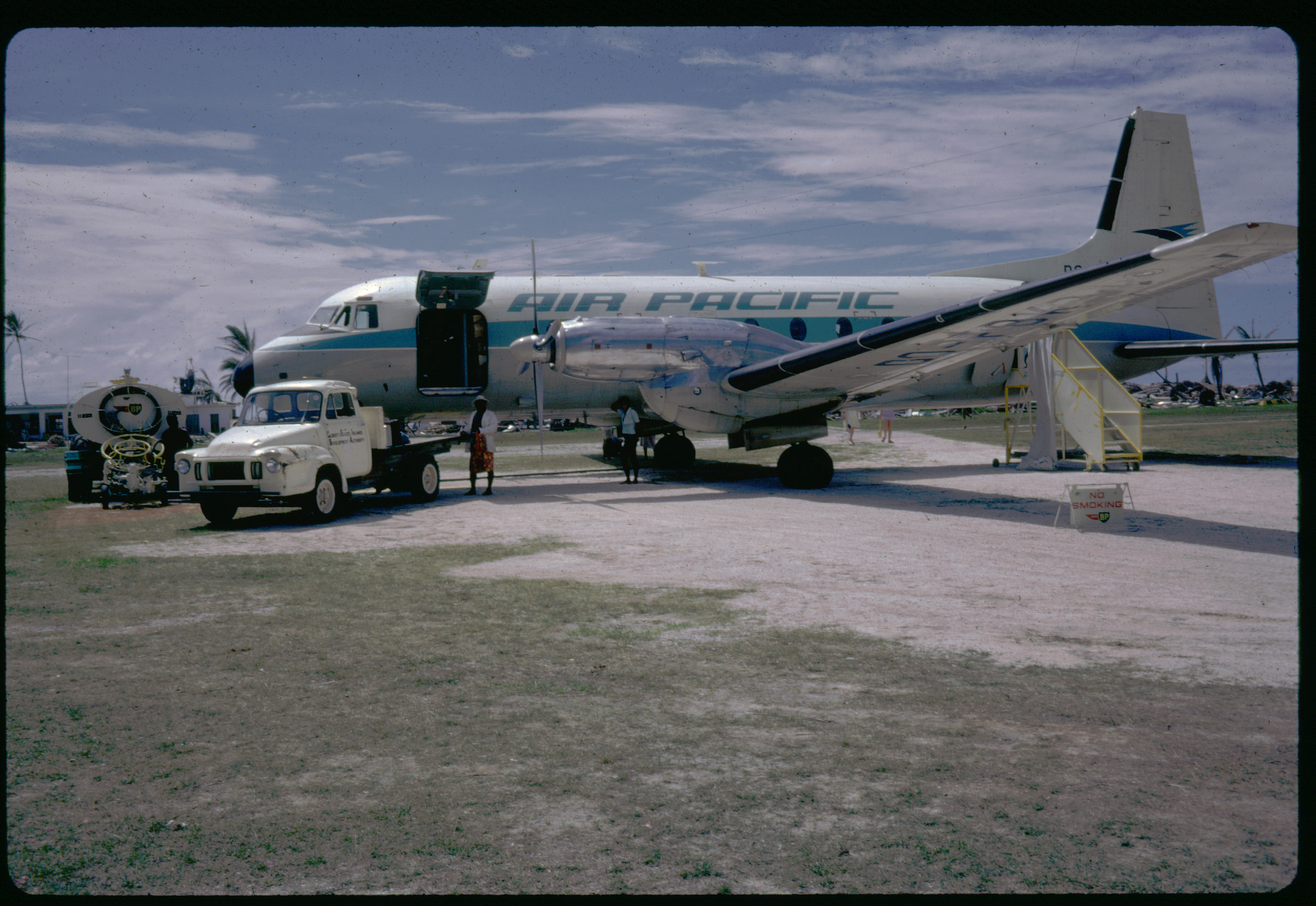
Air Pacific HS 748 at Funafuti in 1972

The Air Pacific logo from 2003 to its rebranding in 2013

By the early 1970s, seven Pacific island governments, some still under British rule at the time, held shares in Air Pacific, in addition to shares held by Qantas, Air New Zealand and the British Overseas Airways Corporation. However, the regional airline idea lost support as some of the shareholding Pacific island governments sold their shares and created their own national airlines.

In the 1970s, tourism became the nation's leading industry, which made the airline even more important to the Fijian economy; and in 1974 the government of Fiji began increasing its shareholding. By 1978, it owned 93%. In 1987, Qantas purchased 20%. In 1993, the government owned 80%, Qantas 10% and Air New Zealand 2%. Having in 1995 acquired a further 8% from Sea-Com, in 1998, Qantas increased its shareholding to 46%.

In the 1990s, the airline relocated its headquarters from the capital city of Suva to the coastal town of Nadi where the main international airport is located. The company also constructed an elaborate aircraft maintenance centre there.

In 2005, Air Pacific acquired Sun Air, a domestic airline, renamed it Pacific Sun and began operations as Air Pacific's domestic and regional subsidiary. In May 2012, Managing Director & CEO Dave Pflieger announced that the airline, which was completing a successful turnaround that included restructuring and re-fleeting, would be re-branded as "Fiji Airways" to help enhance sales and marketing of the airline and the south Pacific island nation. In June 2014, Pacific Sun was rebranded to Fiji Link.

=== Rebranding as Fiji Airways ===
In May 2012, the airline announced that it would be rebranding to its original name of Fiji Airways, with the rebranding coinciding with the delivery of the A330 aircraft in 2013. Fiji Airways' new logo, a "Masi symbol that epitomises Fiji and enhances the new name of Fiji's national carrier", was announced by Managing Director & CEO Dave Pflieger on 17 August 2012. The design was created by local Fijian Masi artist, Makereta Matemosi. The airline's new brand identity and colour scheme were fully revealed by the CEO and Prime Minister of Fiji at a formal red-carpet, black-tie event in Suva on 10 October 2012, in conjunction with Fiji Day.

The rebranding to Fiji Airways officially took place on 27 June 2013. The name change aimed to associate the airline more closely with the nation and to be more visible in search results. Also during the rebranding of Air Pacific to Fiji Airways, a new line of uniforms for its cabin crew was launched, and was designed by Fiji-based French designer Alexandra Poenaru-Philp. In China, the name Air Pacific was often confused with Hong Kong airline Cathay Pacific, Philippine airline Cebu Pacific and a Chinese air conditioning company. With the rebranding came a name change for the airline's booking classes. The Pacific Voyager (economy) and Tabua Class (business) of Air Pacific became the Fiji Airways' Economy and Fiji Airways' Business Class. The airline also launched a new website with the rebranding.

=== Fleet history ===
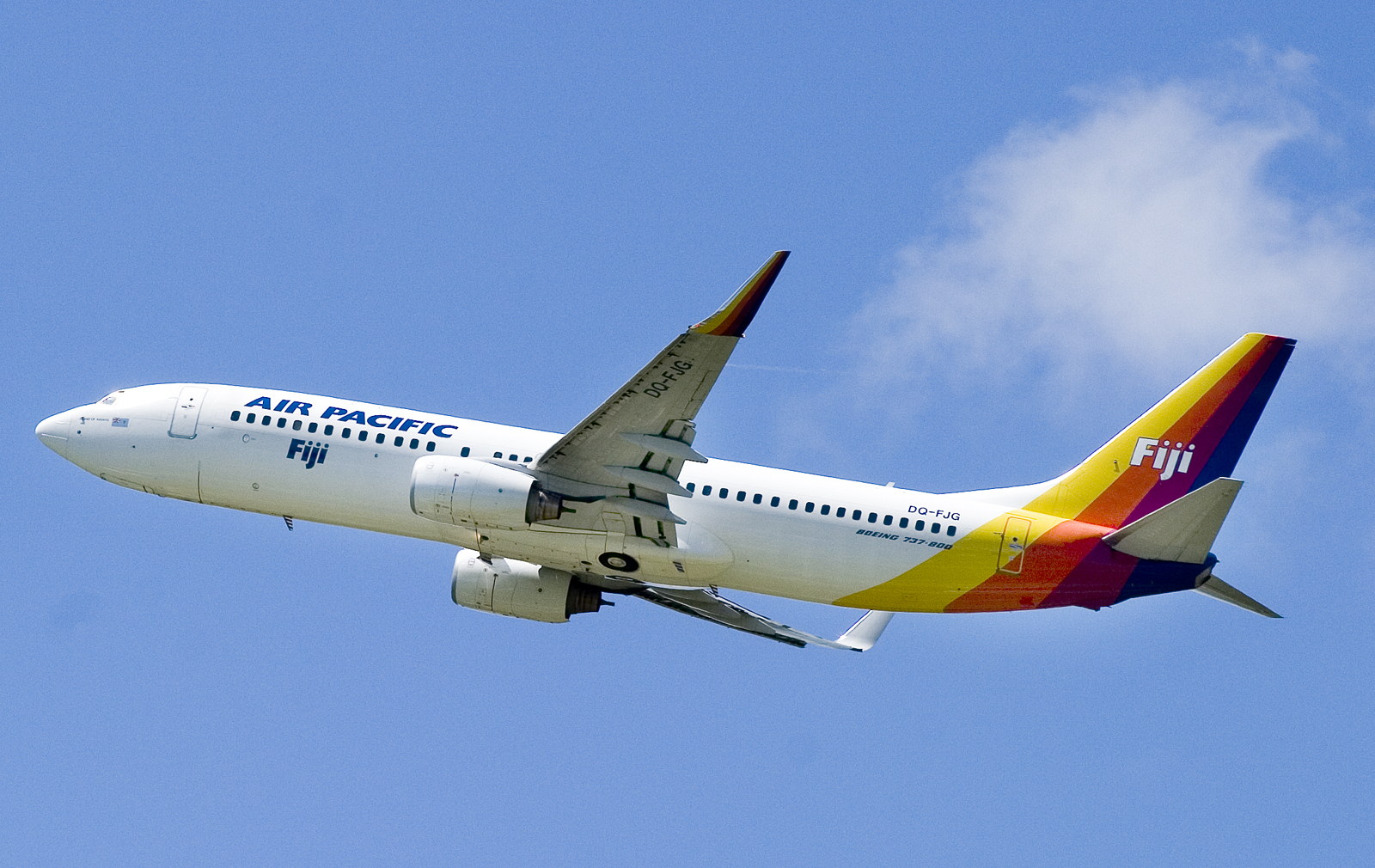
Air Pacific Boeing 737

Fiji Airways used small de Havilland Dragon Rapide and de Havilland Australia DHA-3 Drover aircraft when it was newly founded. The fleet grew to include two ATR 42 turboprops and two leased jets, a Boeing 747-200B and a Boeing 767. By the late 1990s, the fleet included both Boeing 737 and 767 jets, while the ATR 42 turboprops were used on domestic flights. Air Pacific also operated 2 BAC 111 Srs 479 jet aircraft from 1973 until 1984. These aircraft operated across the airline's network including to Australia. The 747 was originally leased from Qantas. In August 1993, it was replaced by a 747 from Air New Zealand. From August 1996, a 747-200 was again leased from Qantas.

The 2000 Fijian coup d'état devastated the country's tourism industry and overall economy, which led to a substantial decrease in travel to Fiji. Faced with a falloff in air traffic, Air Pacific returned one of its two leased Boeing 747s. In 2003, Air Pacific received the first of two Boeing 747-400s it was leasing from Singapore Airlines. They had previously been leased with Ansett Australia until Ansett's collapse in 2001.

In 2006, Air Pacific ordered five Boeing 787-9s. In April 2011, Air Pacific announced that it had cancelled its Boeing 787-9 order due to delivery delays of almost four years by Boeing. In October 2011, Air Pacific announced that it had ordered three Airbus A330-200s. In March 2013, the company received its first "Fiji Airways" branded Airbus A330. It was christened The Island of Taveuni and had its first flight to Auckland on 2 April. In June, one of the Boeing 747-400s was retired. The other, although 'withdrawn from service', was used on an ad-hoc basis when needed. It was retired on 20 November 2013 when it was flown to be scrapped. Today, the fleet includes four Airbus A350-900, three Airbus A330-200s, one Airbus A330-300, one Boeing 737-800, and five Boeing 737 MAX 8s. Fiji Link operates two ATR 72-600, an ATR 42-600 and three de Havilland Canada DHC-6 Twin Otter aircraft. In preparation of the rebranding, Air Pacific retired its Boeing 747-412s from service.

On 2 May 2019, Fiji Airways announced its intention to lease two Airbus A350-900 from Dubai Aerospace Enterprise as a part of their fleet expansion. They operate on routes to Australia, New Zealand and the United States. These A350 frames were originally to be delivered to Hong Kong Airlines, however following the cancellation of that order, they were purchased by Dubai Aerospace Enterprise.

As a result of the COVID-19 pandemic, Fiji Airways announced 800 job losses in Fiji on 25 May 2020.

=== Recent developments ===
In partnership with Qantas, Air Pacific helped pioneer the concept of codeshare agreements in the early 1980s. Today, codesharing is an accepted airline practice all over the world. In the 1990s, Air Pacific signed a codeshare agreement with Canadian Airlines, allowing it to transport traffic from Toronto on to Auckland, New Zealand. Soon after it struck a codeshare deal with American Airlines.

Qantas, which owned less than 20% of Air Pacific at the time, began a ten-year management contract with the airline in 1985 to help reverse the financial losses the company was struggling with. In 1986, Air Pacific posted a profit of nearly $100,000. In 1987, Qantas paid a reported $3.5 million for a 20 percent stake in Air Pacific. Qantas raised its equity from 17.45 percent to 46 percent in 1998.

On 25 January 1995, Air Pacific and the then Royal Tongan Airlines began a joint leasing of aircraft. The concept came complete with the livery of the two airlines painted on each side of the Boeing 737-300 fuselage.

Fiji Airways has a subsidiary airline Fiji Link (formerly Pacific Sun) that offers domestic flights and flights to the nearby islands of Tonga, Samoa, Tuvalu and Vanuatu. Fiji Airways is also a partner with the frequent flyer programmes of Alaska Airlines, American Airlines, and Qantas.

Fiji Airways codeshares with Air Vanuatu, Alaska Airlines, American Airlines, Cathay Pacific, Hong Kong Airlines, Jetstar, Jetstar Asia, Qantas, Samoa Airways, Singapore Airlines, and Solomon Airlines.

Fiji Airways has been a Connect Member of Oneworld since 5 December 2018.

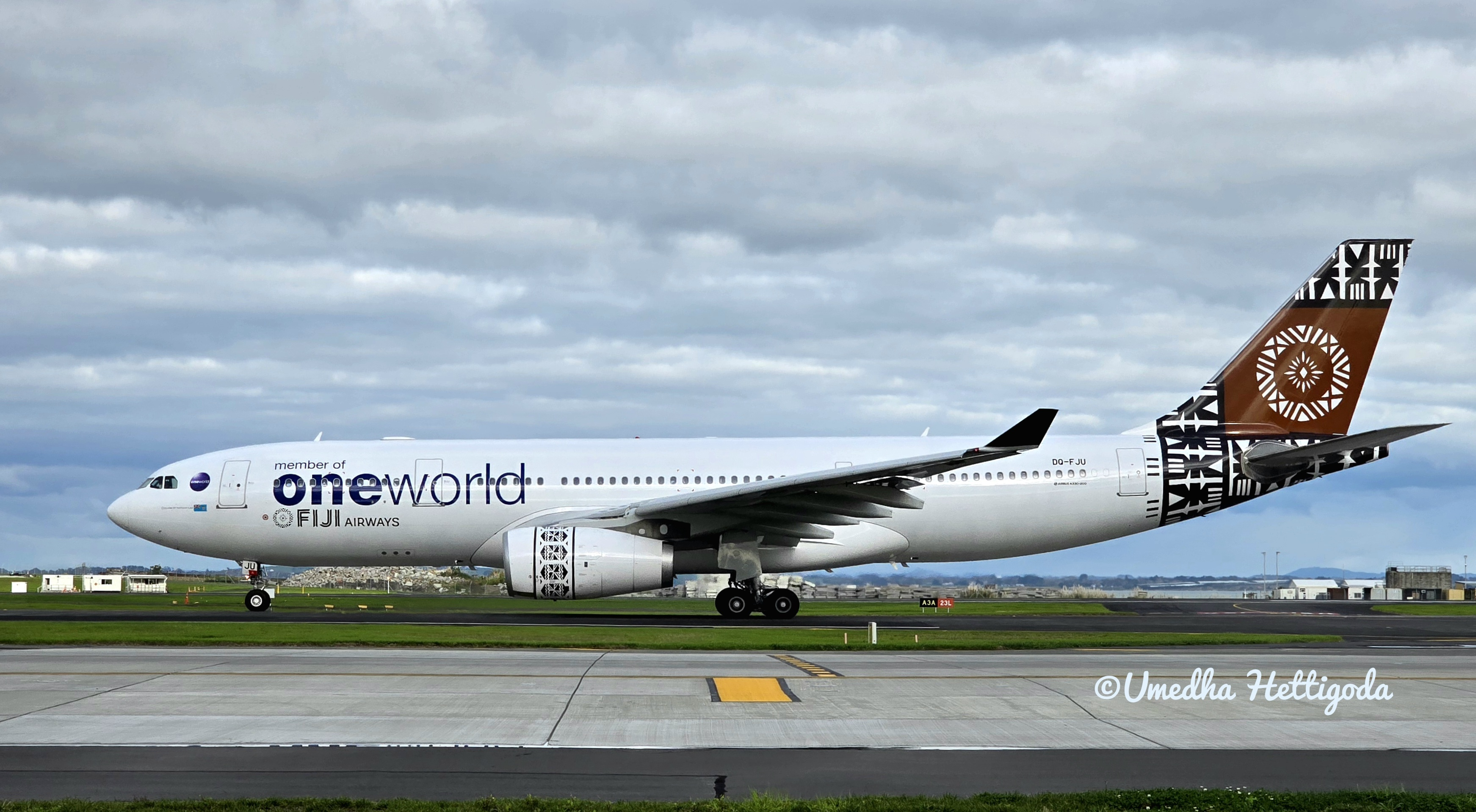
Fiji Airways Airbus A330-243 in Oneworld livery

In June 2024, Oneworld and Fiji Airways announced that Fiji Airways would become the alliance's 15th full member of the alliance with the transition set to begin immediately and be complete within 12 months. That same month, American Airlines announced that Fiji Airways would join its frequent-flyer program, AAdvantage, sometime within the ensuing year. Fiji Airways membership upgrade from Connect member to full membership officially concluded on 1 April 2025, with the carrier joining AAdvantage on the same day.

In November 2024, the airline implemented a complimentary unlimited onboard Wi-Fi system for instant messaging across all classes.

== Corporate affairs ==
=== Ownership and structure ===
Fiji Airways is part of the Air Pacific Group (which includes the national airline, its wholly owned subsidiary Fiji Link, and a 38.75% stake in the Sofitel Fiji Resort & Spa on Denarau Island). The Air Pacific Group itself is owned by the Fijian government (50%), Fiji National Provident Fund (30%) the Australian flag-carrier Qantas (16%), and Air New Zealand (4%).

=== Business trends ===
The airline was largely profitable from 1995 to 2004, with the exception of 2001. In the late 2000s, the airline suffered back-to-back losses of FJ$5.2 million for fiscal year 2008–2009 and FJ$65.3 million for 2009–2010. It posted FJ$24.8 in 2009–2010 and FJ$11.4 in 2011–2012, respectively. After switching to a fiscal year that ends on 31 December, the airline reported profits for 9 months in 2013 of FJ$8.3 million. In 2014, the airline posted a FJ$55.6 million profit.

The key trends for Fiji Airways, and the overall Group (including Fiji Link operations), are shown below (as at year ending 31 March until March 2013; year ending 31 December thereafter):

	Mar 2009	Mar 2010	Mar 2011	Mar 2012	Mar 2013	*Dec 2013	Dec 2014	Dec 2015	Dec 2016	Dec 2017	Dec 2018
Fiji Airways
Turnover (FJ$m)		515.0	555.3	645.9	659.7	512.9	735.6				
Profit (before tax)(FJ$m)		−91.8	−3.7	16.5	18.0	8.3	65.2				
Statutory profit after income tax (FJ$m)	−5.2	−65.3	24.8	11.4	14.1	8.7	55.6				
Number of aircraft (at year end)			6	6	7	7	7	9			
Air Pacific Group
Turnover (FJ$m)		544.6	586.7	678.3	690.6	541.2	769.5	815.3	825.3	929.0	1,018.7
Profit (before tax)(FJ$m)		−78.5	−4.3	14.2	22.4	14.2	60.8	70.2	84.5	95.8	55.3
Profit after income tax (FJ$m)		−58.9	25.3	10.7	17.8	14.5	52.9				n/a
Number of employees				800	n/a	n/a	n/a	>1,000		1,384	n/a
Number of passengers (m)			1.1	1.2	1.2	n/a	1.2	1.3	1.4	1.6	1.7
Passenger load factor (%)					n/a	77	83				n/a
Number of aircraft (at year end)							13	12		16	
Notes/sources						*9 mon					

=== Sponsorships ===
In October 2017, Fiji Airways became the official airline of Fiji Rugby. The sponsorship saw Fiji Airways taking over the following Fiji Rugby teams with major naming and branding rights for the next five years: Fiji Airways Flying Fijians (15s team); Fiji Airways National 7s Team; Fiji Airways Fijiana 15s Team (Women's 15s team); Fiji Airways Fijiana 7s Team (Women's 7s team); Fiji Airways Drua; Fiji Link Referees (all referees in Fiji will be sponsored by and will wear Fiji Link branded apparel).

In February 2018, it announced its exclusive airline sponsorship of Super Rugby champions, the BNZ Crusaders.

The airline is also a sponsor of the Fiji International Golf tournament.

== Destinations ==
Fiji Airways serves 28 destinations as of January 2026.

=== Codeshare agreements ===
Fiji Airways has codeshare agreements with the following airlines:

- Air India
- Air New Zealand
- Air Niugini
- Alaska Airlines
- American Airlines
- British Airways
- Cathay Pacific
- Finnair
- Japan Airlines
- Jetstar
- Qantas
- Singapore Airlines
- Solomon Airlines
- WestJet

=== Interline agreements ===
Fiji Airways also has interline agreements with the following airlines:

- Air Canada
- Air India
- Air New Zealand
- Alaska Airlines
- American Airlines
- British Airways
- Cathay Pacific
- Emirates
- Finnair
- French Bee
- Garuda Indonesia
- Iberia Airlines
- Japan Airlines
- Japan Transocean Air
- Jetstar
- Korean Air
- Malaysia Airlines
- Oman Air
- Porter Airlines
- Qantas
- Qatar Airways
- Royal Air Maroc
- Royal Jordanian
- Singapore Airlines
- Solomon Airlines
- SriLankan Airlines
- WestJet

== Fleet ==
=== Current fleet ===
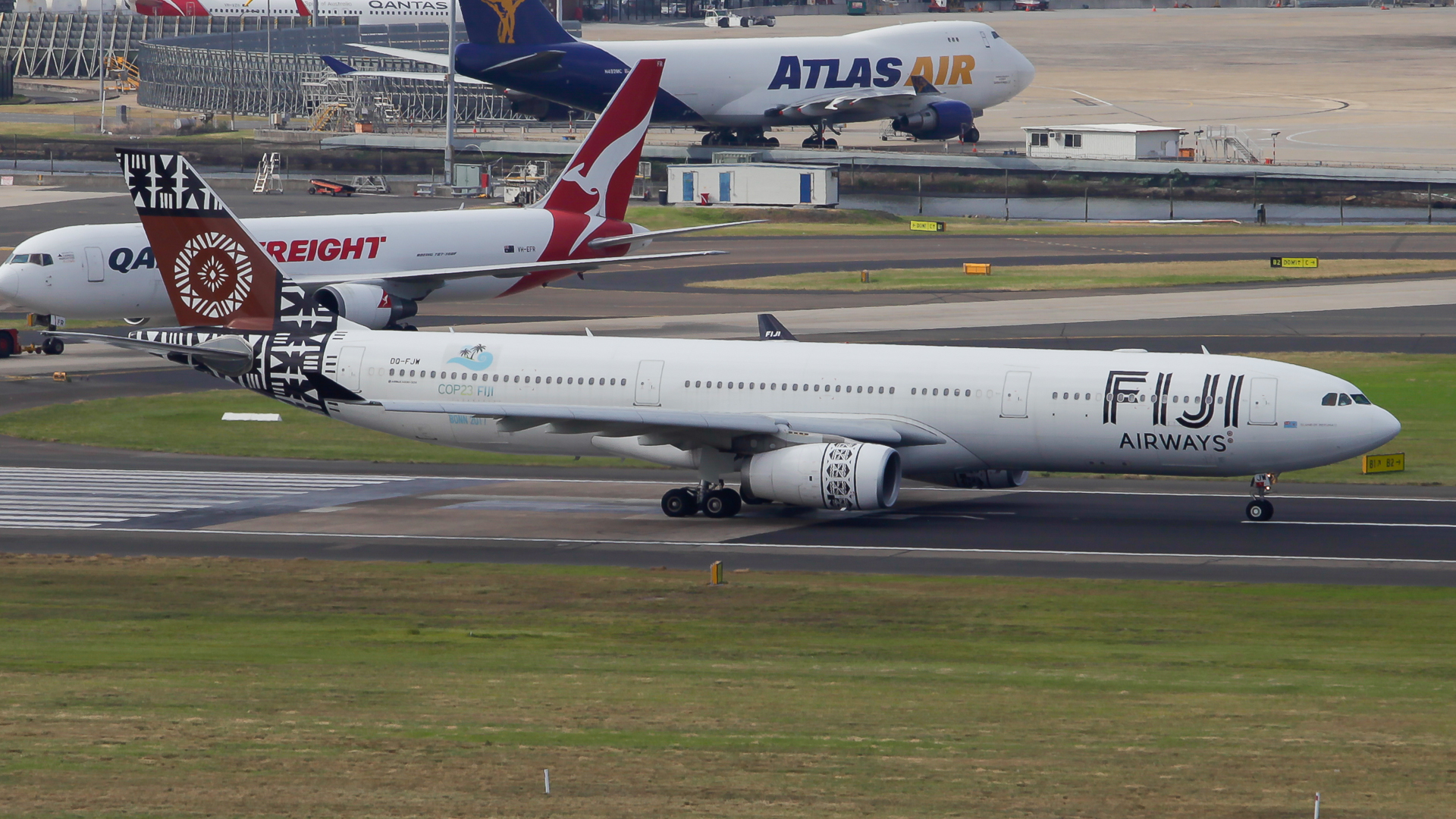
Fiji Airways Airbus A330-300

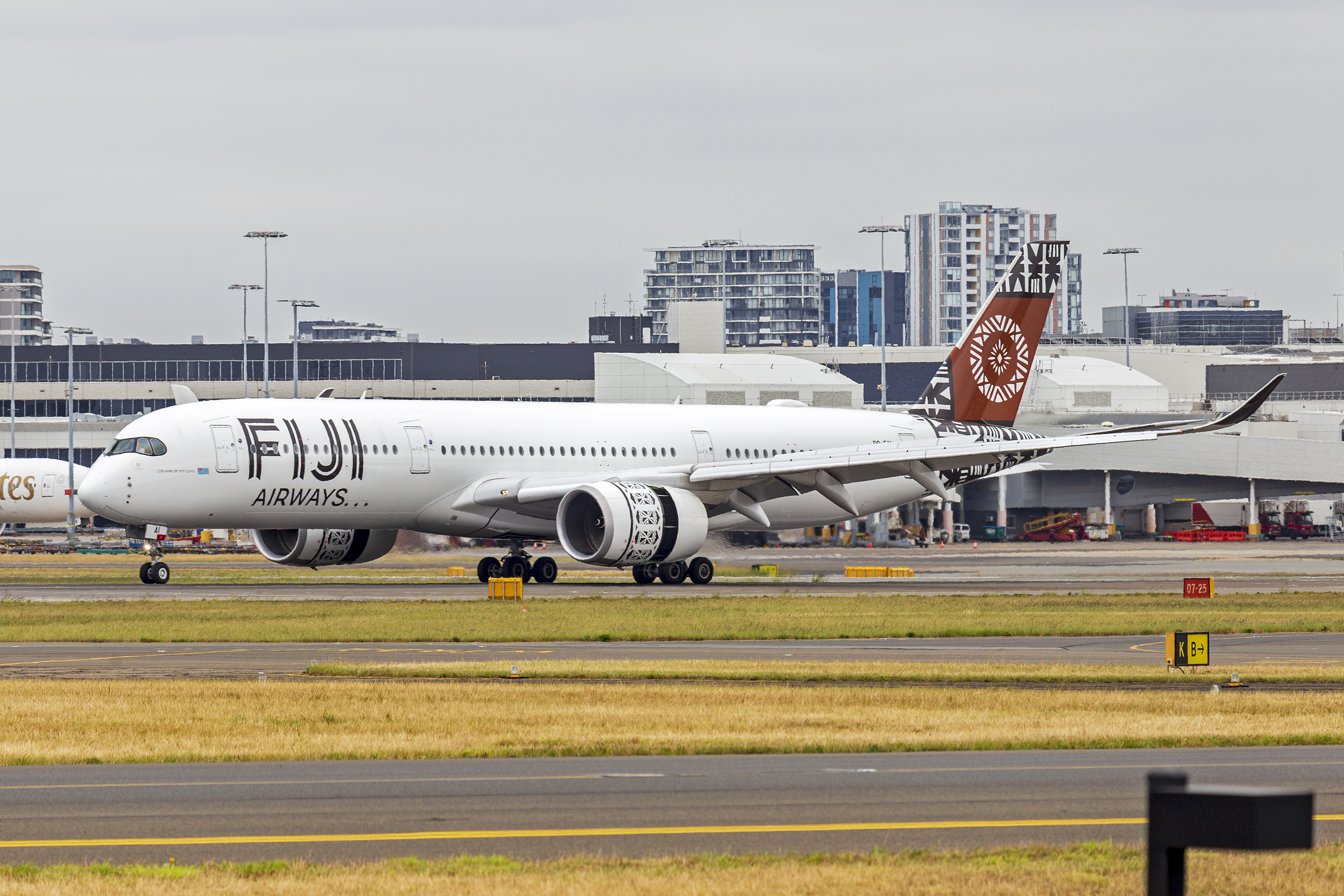
Fiji Airways Airbus A350-900 at Sydney Airport

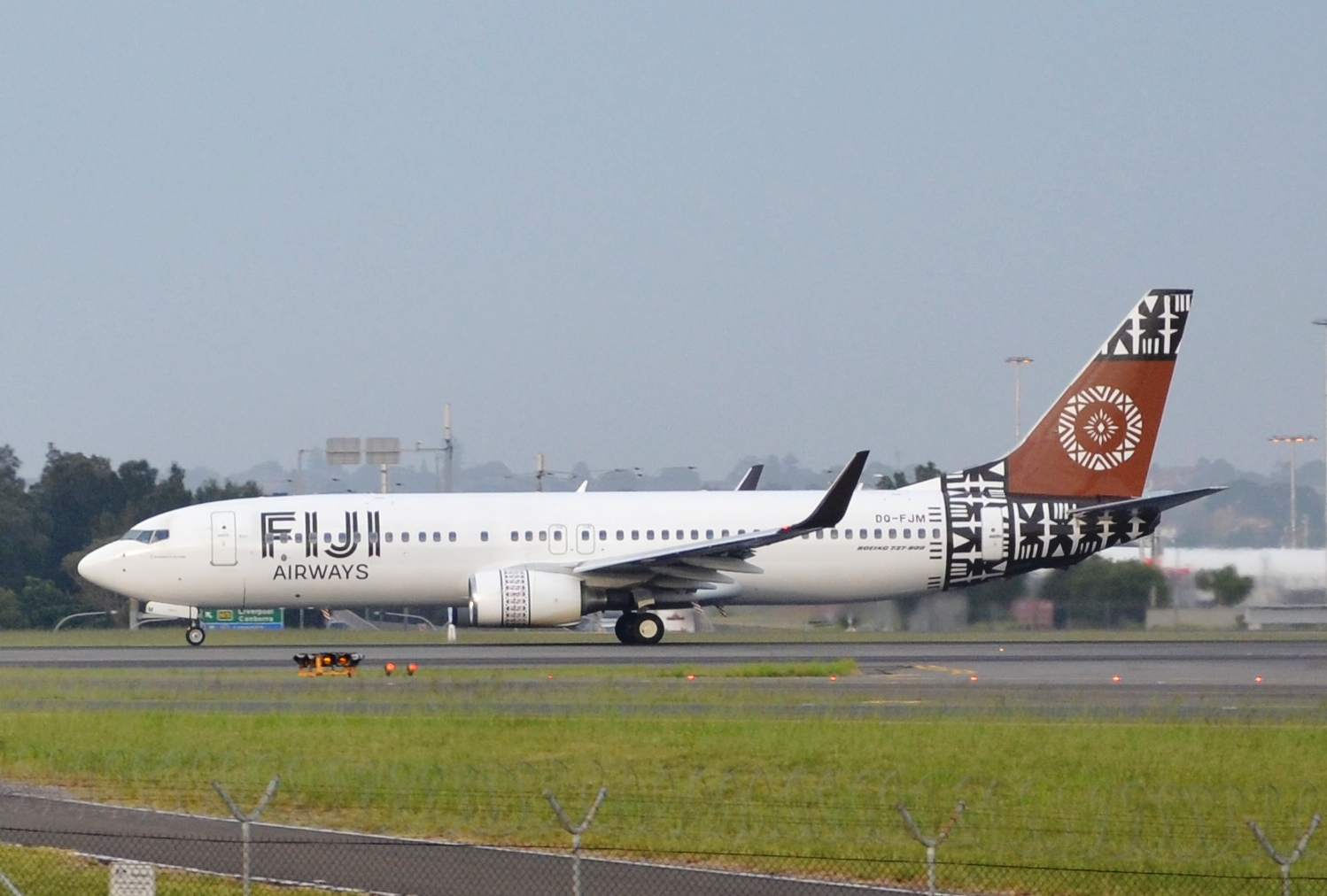
Fiji Airways Boeing 737-800

As of July 2026, Fiji Airways operates the following aircraft:

Fiji Airways fleet
Aircraft	In service	Orders	Passengers			Notes
Aircraft	In service	Orders	T	V	Total	Notes
Airbus A330-200	3	—	24	249	273	
Airbus A330-300	1	—	24	289	313	
Airbus A350-900	4	—	33	301	334	
Boeing 737-800	1	—	8	162	170	
Boeing 737 MAX 8	5	—	8	162	170	
Total	14	—				

=== Former fleet ===
As of August 2025, Fiji Airways operated 3 Airbus A330-200, 1 Airbus A330-300, 4 Airbus A350-900, 1 Boeing 737-800 and 5 Boeing 737-8 MAX.

== Award and recognition ==
On 24 June 2024, Fiji Airways was voted 2024 Best Airline in Australia/Pacific and Best Airline Staff Service in Australia/Pacific by Skytrax.
