= Matei Airport =

Airport in Fiji

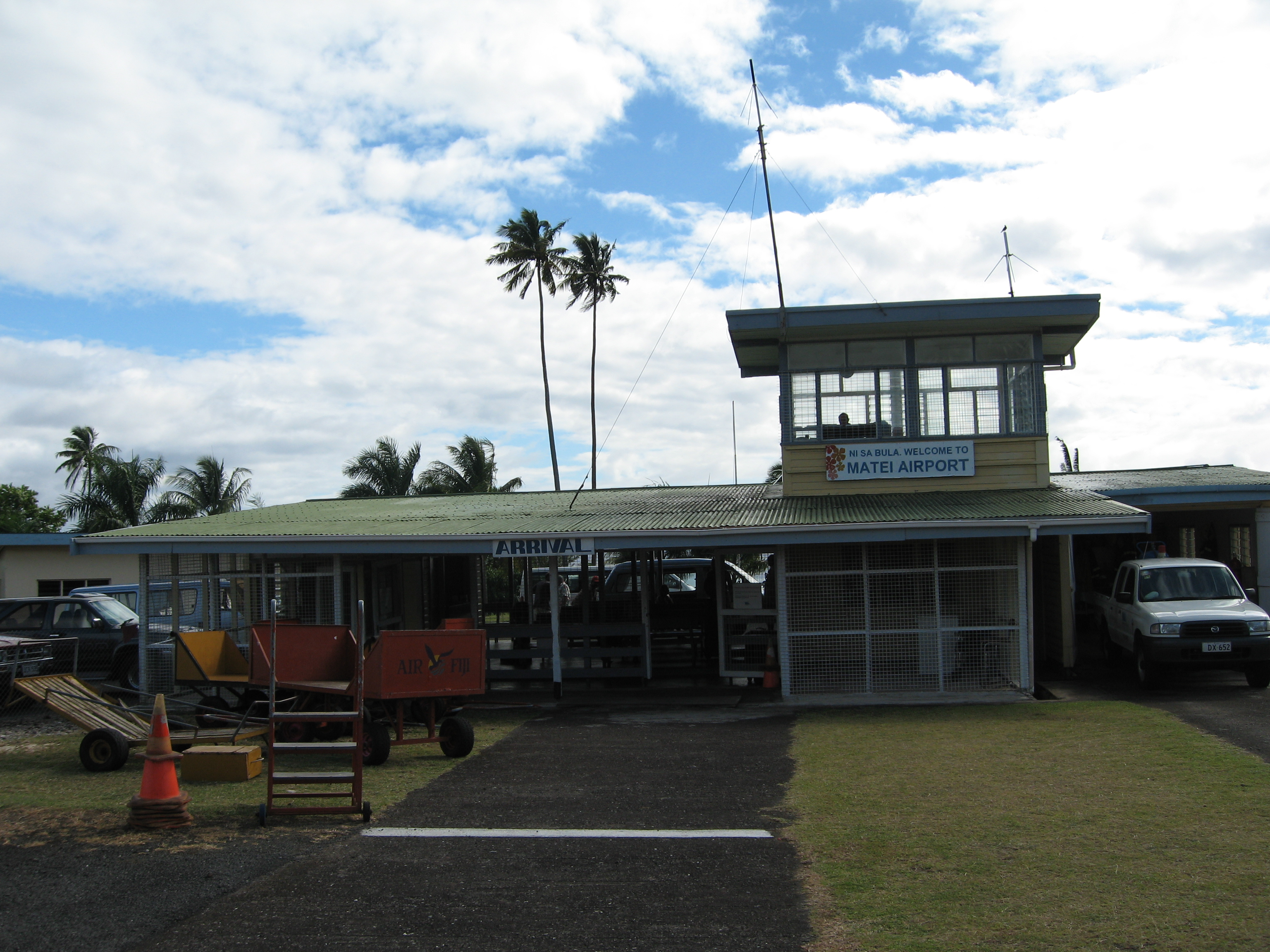
- Matei Airport, 2006
- IATA: TVU; ICAO: NFNM

Summary
- Airport type: Public
- Operator: Airports Fiji Limited
- Serves: Matei, Taveuni Island, Fiji
- Coordinates: 16°41′26″S 179°52′37″W

Map
- Location of airport in Fiji

Runways
Direction	Length		Surface
Direction	m	ft	Surface
11/29	910	2,986	Hard

Matei Airport (IATA: TVU, ICAO: NFNM), also known as Taveuni Airport or Taveuni Island Airport, is an airport located in Matei on the northern end of Taveuni, an island of the Vanua Levu Group in Fiji. It is operated by Airports Fiji Limited.

The airport is quite small but receives a number of flights from Fiji Link from Nadi and Suva. The airport is quite close to a number of resorts and small accommodation providers. The airport also has recently been upgraded from a gravel runway to a paved runway.

== Facilities ==
The airport has one runway which is 910 metres (2,986 ft) in length.

== Airlines and destinations ==
Fiji Link connects Matei Airport to Nadi International Airport and Nausori International Airport (Suva).
