= Lakeba Airport =

Airport in Fiji

- IATA: LKB; ICAO: NFNK

Summary
- Airport type: Public
- Operator: Airports Fiji Limited
- Serves: Lakeba, Fiji
- Elevation AMSL: 280 ft (85 m)
- Coordinates: 18°11′57″S 178°49′01″W

Map
- Location of airport in Fiji

Runways
Direction	Length		Surface
Direction	m	ft	Surface
	723	2,372	Paved

Lakeba Airport (IATA: LKB, ICAO: NFNK) is an airport in Lakeba (pronounced [laˈkemba]), one of the Lau Islands in southern Fiji. It is operated by Airports Fiji Limited. In 2019 300,000 Fijian dollars were spent to upgrade the runway.

== Facilities ==
The airport resides at an elevation of 280 feet (85 m) above mean sea level. It has one runway which measures 723 by 24 metres (2,372 ft × 79 ft).

== Airlines and destinations ==
Fiji Link connects Lakeba Airport to Nausori International Airport (Suva).
