= Koro Airport =

Airport in Fiji

- IATA: KXF; ICAO: NFNO

Summary
- Airport type: Public
- Operator: Airports Fiji Limited
- Serves: Koro Island, Fiji
- Elevation AMSL: 358 ft (109 m)
- Coordinates: 17°20′45″S 179°25′19″E

Map
- Location of airport in Fiji

Runways
Direction	Length		Surface
Direction	m	ft	Surface
10/28	790	2,592
- Source: Great Circle Mapper

Koro Airport (IATA: KXF, ICAO: NFNO) is an airport serving Koro, one of the Lomaiviti Islands in Fiji. It is operated by Airports Fiji Limited.

== Facilities ==
The airport resides at an elevation of 358 feet (109 m) above mean sea level. It has one grass runway which measures 790 metres (2,592 ft) in length.

It's the only airport in Fiji which has a sloped runway. It only has one weekly flight from Suva-Nausori, with a Britten-Norman Islander from Northern Air.

== Airlines and destinations ==
Koro Airport is connected to Nausori International Airport (Suva) by Fiji Link and Northern Air.
