= Laucala Airport =

Airport in Laucala, Taveuni, Fiji

- IATA: LUC; ICAO: NFNH

Summary
- Airport type: Public
- Owner: Laucala Island
- Operator: Airports Fiji Limited
- Serves: Laucala, Lau Islands, Northern Division, Fiji
- Elevation AMSL: 4 m / 13 ft
- Coordinates: 16°44′53″S 179°40′01″W

Map
- Location of the airport in Fiji

Runways
Direction	Length		Surface
Direction	ft	m	Surface
	3,743	1,141	Concrete
- Source: GCM, STV

Laucala Airport (IATA: LUC, ICAO: NFNH) is an aerodrome serving Laucala, one of three small islands lying to the east of Thurston Point on the island of Taveuni in Northern Division of Fiji. The privately owned island is the site of the exclusive Laucala Resort.
