= Nadi International Airport =

Main international airport serving Nadi, Fiji

Nadi International Airport Rara ni Waqavuka na Nadi नाडी अंतर्राष्ट्रीय हवाई अड्डा
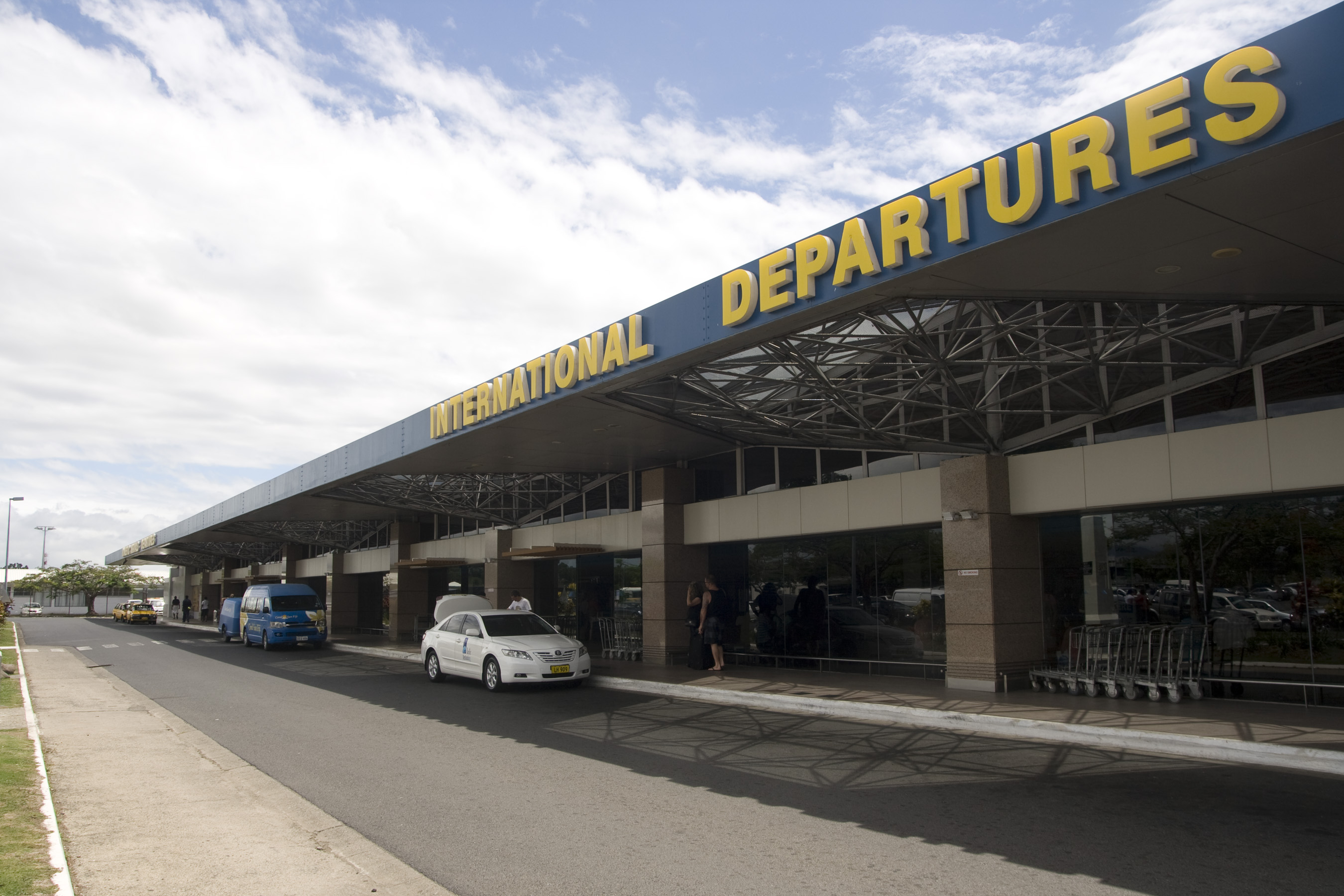
- IATA: NAN; ICAO: NFFN

Summary
- Airport type: Public
- Operator: Airports Fiji Limited (AFL)
- Serves: Nadi
- Location: Namaka, Ba Province, Western Division, Viti Levu, Fiji
- Hub for: Fiji Airways; Fiji Link
- Elevation AMSL: 18 m (59 ft)
- Coordinates: 17°45′19″S 177°26′36″E
- Website: www.airportsfiji.com

Map
- Location of airport in Fiji NAN/NFFN (Oceania)

Runways
Direction	Length		Surface
Direction	m	ft	Surface
02/20	3,206	10,518	Bituminous
09/27	2,134	7,001	Bituminous

Statistics (2019)
- Total passengers: 2,485,319
- International passengers: 2,166,584
- Domestic passengers: 318,735
- Source: Airports Fiji Limited (AFL)

Nadi International Airport (IATA: NAN, ICAO: NFFN) is the main international airport of Fiji as well as an important regional hub for the South Pacific islands, located by the coast on the Ba Province in the Western Division of the main island Viti Levu. Owned and operated by Fiji Airports Limited, it is the main hub of Fiji Airways and its domestic and regional subsidiary Fiji Link. The airport is located at Namaka, 10 km (6.2 mi) from the city of Nadi and 20 km (12 mi) from the city of Lautoka. In 2019, it handled 2,485,319 passengers on international and domestic flights. It handles about 97% of international visitors to Fiji, of whom 86% are tourists. Despite being Fiji's main airport, it is a considerable distance from the country's major population centre; it is located 192 km (119 mi) northwest of the country's capital and largest city Suva and its own airport, Nausori International Airport.

== History ==
The original airstrips at Nadi were built by New Zealand from August 1939, being completed in March 1940; they were paid for by the British colonial authorities. They were extended by New Zealand from November 1941; the first 7,000 feet (2,100 m) runway was completed by January 1942 and the other two by April 1942. The work was requested by the United States of America for the South Pacific air ferry route and paid for as reverse Lend-Lease. In 1941 American engineer Leif J. Sverdrup discussed progress on the airfields with Walter Nash, then New Zealand Minister of Finance. Nash recalled Sverdrup saying that there was no formal agreement for payment for what was called Nandi Airport by America, so on the back of one of his cards Sverdrup drew a cross representing the airfield, wrote "£250,000" and initialled it "L.J.S." The extension was actually estimated to cost £750,000.

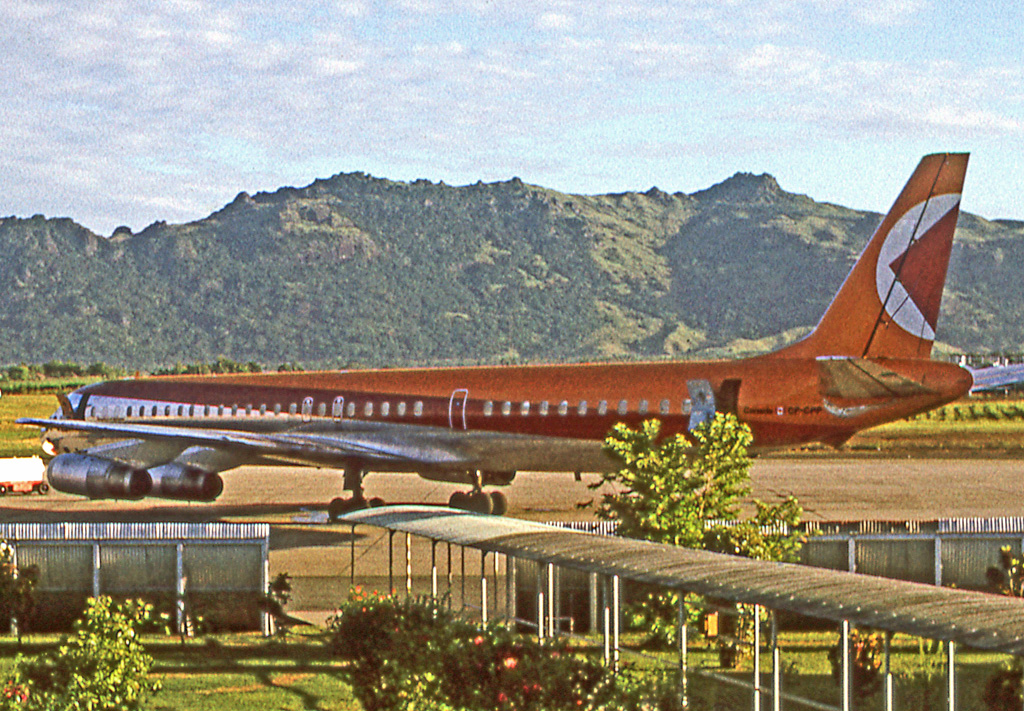
Nadi Airport in 1971, showing the open-sided covered walkways between the aircraft and terminal

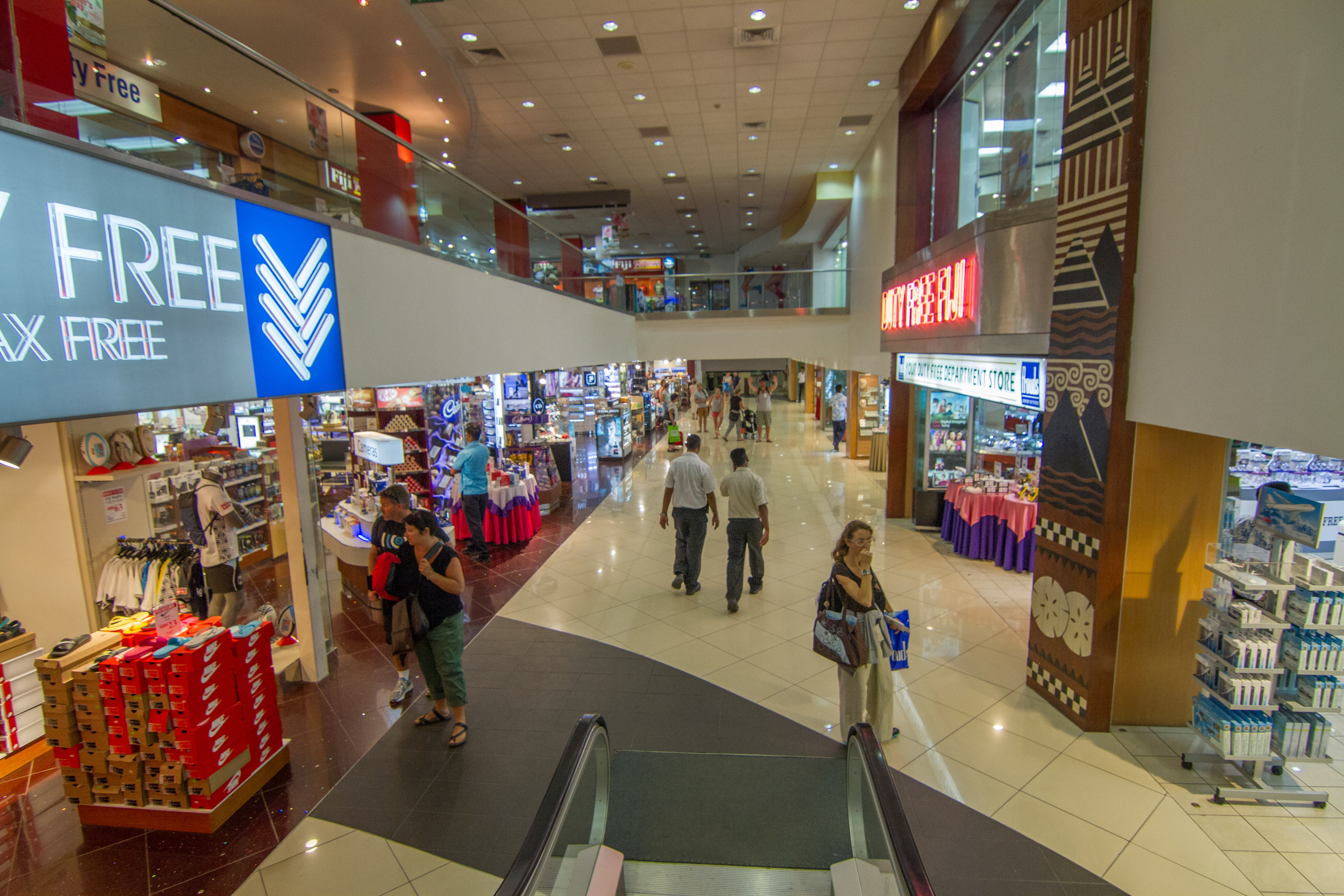
Departures area

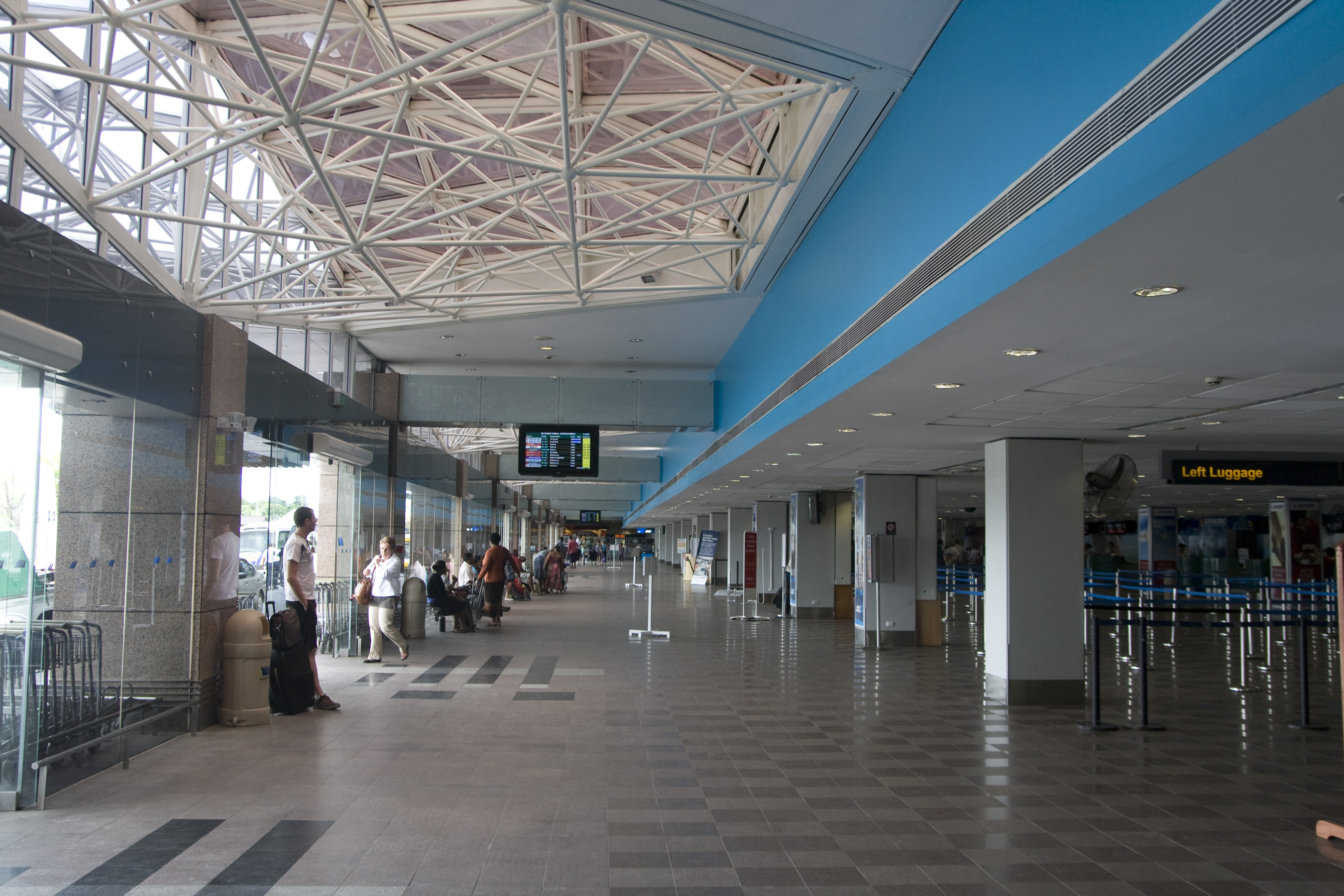
Departures area

Then, as now, Fiji was the crossroads of the Pacific – and in those days was even more important as a refuelling stop. The apron was shaded by palms, crotons and hibiscus trees, with whitewashed stone paths connecting it to the terminal. These have now been lost under concrete as the apron has expanded over the years, as aeroplanes larger in both number and size land at Nadi. In the 1940s and '50s, the airport's official name was Colony of Fiji: Nadi Airport, although foreign timetables continued to spell the name in phonetic English: Nandi.

Nadi was selected as the major airport for Fiji mainly due to its location on the drier west coast of Viti Levu.

During the first half of the 1960s, Nadi served as a key airport for transfer of passengers from Auckland's Whenuapai Airport which could only take turboprop and piston aeroplanes, onto the new DC-8s and Boeing 707s bound for North America and Europe. At one time, New Zealand controlled the world's largest Flight Information Service (FIS), which at its largest stretched to 10,360,000 square kilometres. All of this was controlled from Nadi, until the much larger Auckland Airport opened at Mangere in 1965 and replaced Whenuapai.

Drama came to Nadi Airport on 19 May 1987. The first coup had just occurred (14 May 1987). Prime Minister Dr Timoci Bavadra and his cabinet were under arrest, and tension continued to rise in the country. Air New Zealand Flight 24 made a scheduled stop to refuel, en route from Tokyo (Narita Airport) to Auckland. Ahmjed Ali, an aircraft refueller, used his security card to board the aeroplane and, once in the cockpit, showed the captain that he was carrying dynamite. He wanted passage out of Fiji and the release of Dr Bavadra. The passengers and cabin crew were able to disembark, while Air New Zealand negotiators in Auckland and Ali's relatives in the Nadi control tower attempted to defuse the escalating situation. Eventually, the flight engineer hit Ali over the head with a bottle of duty-free whisky, and he was handed over to the Nadi police.

In 1999, Fiji Airports Limited was established by an act of Fiji's Parliament as a state-owned enterprise. Its role is to operate and administer airports in Fiji, including Nadi International.

In 2013, a $130m modernisation of passenger terminal facilities at Nadi Airport was commenced by Airports Fiji Limited. Construction firms Hawkins Construction and Pacific Building Solutions were contracted for the works, while Thinc and EC Harris were engaged as asset management consultants. These projects were completed in April 2017, and officially unveiled in June 2018.

In 2019, Airports Fiji announced that Nadi would undergo further improvements, with plans for a new runway extending into the sea and an extension of the international terminal, as well as other projects including smart technologies, added taxiways and a new administration building, fire station and control tower.

== Operations ==
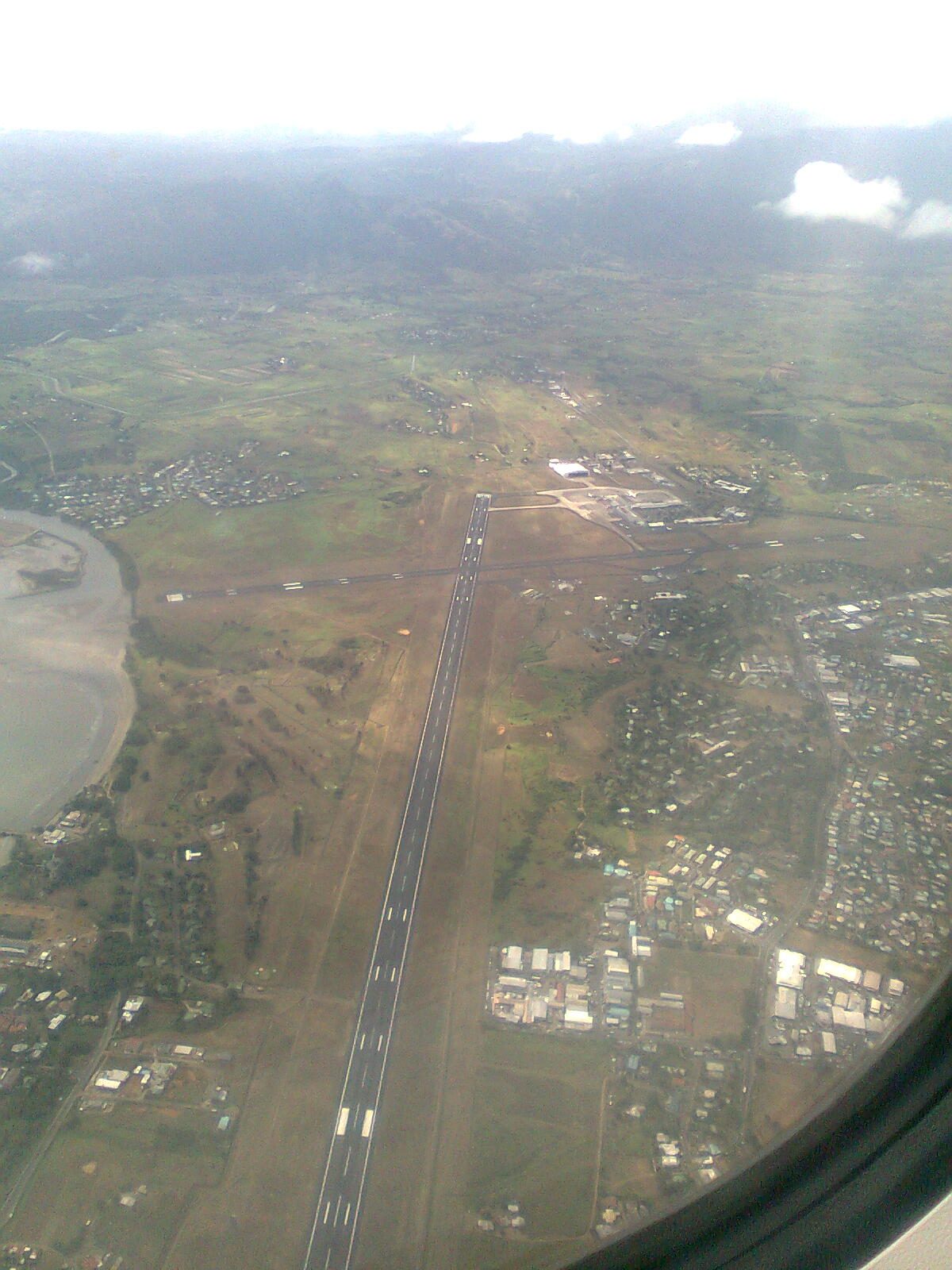
Aerial view

In 2008, a Qantas Airbus A380 had to make an emergency landing to disembark a sick passenger, showing that whilst not certified, the facilities at Nadi are sufficient to cater for the largest passenger aeroplane in the world.

Nadi is the operational base for Fiji Airways, which services six airports throughout the southwest Pacific, and many more on the Pacific Rim.

The Civil Aviation Authority of Fiji (CAAFI) head office is at Nadi Airport. Fiji Airways has its head office in the Fiji Airways Maintenance & Administration Centre at the airport. In addition, Fiji Airlines Limited, operating as Fiji Link, is headquartered at the Pacific Sun office at the CAAFI compound. Additionally the Fiji Meteorological Service has its headquarters on the airport property.

== Airlines and destinations ==
Airlines	Destinations
Air New Zealand	Auckland
Air Niugini	Port Moresby
Fiji Airways	Adelaide, Apia–Faleolo, Auckland, Brisbane, Cairns, Canberra (ends 5 February 2027), Christchurch, Funafuti, Gold Coast, Hong Kong, Honiara, Honolulu, Kiritimati, Los Angeles, Melbourne, Nouméa, San Francisco, Singapore, Sydney–Kingsford Smith, Sydney–Western (begins 19 March 2027), Tarawa, Tokyo-Narita, Vancouver, Wellington; Seasonal: Vavaʻu
Jetstar	Melbourne, Sydney–Kingsford Smith
Qantas	Sydney–Kingsford Smith
Solomon Airlines	Honiara
Virgin Australia	Brisbane, Melbourne, Sydney–Kingsford Smith

== See also ==
- U.S. Army Air Forces in the South Pacific

== Sources ==
- Maurer, Maurer (1983). Air Force Combat Units of World War II. Maxwell AFB, Alabama: Office of Air Force History. ISBN 0-89201-092-4.
- Maurer, Maurer, ed. (1982) [1969]. Combat Squadrons of the Air Force, World War II (PDF) (reprint ed.). Washington, DC: Office of Air Force History. ISBN 0-405-12194-6. LCCN 70605402. OCLC 72556. Archived from the original (PDF) on 20 December 2016.
