= List of islands of Fiji =

This is a list of islands of Fiji. Fiji is an archipelago in the Pacific Ocean.

It is split into 9 separate geographic island groups. The smallest is the Conway Reef Islands and Skerries, and the largest is the Vanua Levu Group.

== Table of Islands ==
Island	Main Town or Capital	Other Towns	Area (km^{2})	Population
Fiji	Suva		18400	891000

=== Conway Reef ===
Island	Main Town or Capital	Other Towns	Area (km^{2})	Population
Conway Reef			0.02	0
Ceva-i-Ra			0.02	0

=== Kadavu Group ===
Island	Main Town or Capital	Other Towns	Area (km^{2})	Population
Kadavu Group	Vunisea		492.933	10850
Buliya Island	Buliya Island	Solomalawe Point	1.8	85
Dravuni	Dravuni	Nakorotikidua Point	0.8	125
Galoa Island	Galoa	Naicucugu, Vunuku	3.55	50
Great Astrolabe Reef			0	0
Kadavu Island	Vunisea	Daku, Daviqele, Dravuwalu, Drue, Kadavu, Kavala, Masagai, Muani, Nabukelevuira, Nacomoto, Naikorokoro, Namara, Rakiraki, Tavuki, Tawaya, Tilva, Vukavu	450.3	10000
Katikua Island			0.235	2
Matanuku Island	Matanuku Island	Dakuinayalewamatua Point, Munisolowaqa Point, Nailumui Point	2.83	110
Nagigia Island			0.14	13
Ono Island	Vabea	Kenia, Manuku, Nabouwalu, Naqara, Narikoso, Naturu, Nukubalavu, Waisomo,	31.14	50
Other	Yaukuvelailai Island	Niuvaqau Island, Solo Island Lighthouse, Vurolevu Island	1.275	363
Vanuakula Island			0.2	0
Waya Island			0.063	2
Yaukuvelevu Island	Yaukuvelevu		0.6	50

=== Lau Islands ===
Island	Main Town or Capital	Other Towns	Area (km^{2})	Population
Lau Islands	Tubou	Lomaloma, Naroi, Nukuni	516.61	11500
Moala Islands	Naroi	Lomati, Tovu	125.25	4000
Matuku Island			30	522
Matuku Islands			0.14	0
Moala Island	Naroi	Cakova, Keteicake, Keteira, Maloku, Muaikacuni, Nakorovusa, Nasoki, Navasa, Nuku, Sailoama, Uciwai, Vadra, Vagalalo, Vuci, Vunuku	65	3000
Totoya	Tovu	Dravuwalu, Jojigo, Ketei, Lawakilevu, Naikasaka, Naivaka, Navu, Onedraga, Udu, Vugalei, Waroka, Wairuarua, Yawalevu, Yaro	30	465
Totoya Islands			0.1	0
Northern Lau Islands	Lomaloma		198.57	2000
Avea Island			2.34	95
Bacon Island			0.048	0
Cicia			35	877
Kaibu			1.5	0
Kanacea	Kanacea		13	10
Katafaga Island	Katafaga Island		0.91	50
Late Cluster			0.02	0
Mago Island	Mago	Mago Port	22.43	35
Munia Island			4.69	1
Naitaba			7.35	156
Namalata Island			1.92	56
Nayau			19.35	293
Other	Malima Island	Kibobo Islets, Nukutolu, Sovu Islets, Thakan Lasemarawa, Vecai	0.595	444
Susui Island			3.65	73
Cikobia-i-Lau			2.705	58
Tuvuca			13.442	107
Vanua Balavu	Lomaloma	Boitaci, Dakuilomaloma, Dakuirase, Daliconi, Levukana, Malaka, Mavana, Mualevu, Muamua, Nabavatu, Nakama, Naqara, Narocivo, Sawana, Tota, Uruone, Vutuna	57	1200
Vatu Vara			3.5	0
Wailagi Lala	Wailagi Lala		0.38	30
Yacata	Yacata	CJ Beach	8.51	220
Yanuyanu Island			0.23	2
Yaroua			0	0
Ono-i-Lau Group	Nukuni	Doi, Lovoni, Matokana	11.65	600
Davura Island			0.33	0
Doi Island	Doi		1.98	96
Mana Island			0.049	0
Ono-i-Lau	Nukuni	Lovoni, Matokana	7.28	273
Tuvana-i-Colo			0.384	0
Tuvana-i-Ra			0.75	2
Udoi Island			0.582	2
Vuata Ono			0.01	0
Yanuia Island			0.285	0
Southern Lau Islands	Tubou		177.1	4000
Aiwa			1.29	0
Fulaga	Muanaira	Muanaicake, Naividamu, Onenamu, Taunavo, Tavalalu, Vuata	18.5	225
Kabara	Tokalau	Du, Lomati, Naikeleaga	32	700
Komo			1.82	1
Lakeba	Tubou	Bucainabua, Levuka, Nasakalevu, Nukunuku, Vakano, Waciwaci, Wainibaia, Waitabu, Yadrana	59.5	2100
Marabo			1.11	0
Moce	Nasau	Korotolu	10.93	425
Namuka-i-Lau			10.85	1
Ogea Driki			5.29	0
Ogea Levu			12.81	107
Olorua			0.3	0
Oneata		Waigori	4.7	132
Other	Karoni Island		0.425	195
Tavunasici			0.46	0
Vanua Vatu			4.1	138
Vuaqava			8.4	0
Yagasa Cluster			4.615	0
Vatoa Group	Vatoa		4.04	300
Vatoa	Vatoa		4.04	300

=== Lomaiviti Islands ===
Island	Main Town or Capital	Other Towns	Area (km^{2})	Population
Lomaiviti Islands	Levuka, Nasau	Sawaieke	426.158	23400
Batiki	Mua	Manuku, Naigani, Yavu	10	300
Caqalai			0.082	1
Gau Island	Sawaieke	Lamiti, Lekanai, Levukaigau, Lovu, Malawai, Nacavanadi, Naviavia, Navukailagi, Nawaikama, Nukuloa, Nukuyaweni, Qarani, Somosomo, Vadravadra, Vanuaso, Vione, Vunuku, Yadua, Waisomo	142.8	4000
Koro Island	Nakodu	Alldin Point, Kade, Mudu, Nabasovi, Nabuna, Nacamaki, Nagaidamu, Namacu, Namadu, Nasau, Navaga, Sinuvaca, Tavua, Tuatua, Vatulele	105.3	4500
Koronimarai Island			0.02	0
Leleuvia			0.09	2
Makogai			8.62	1
Makodroga Island			0.83	0
Moturiki	Nasauvuki	Daku, Naicabecabe, Nasesara, Navuti, Niubasaga, Savuna, Uluibau, Wawa	14.82	1800
Nairai	Natauloa	Lawaki, Namatana, Tovulailai, Vutuna, Waitoga	25.7	2000
Nairai Islands			0.11	0
Natavola Island			0.1	0
Ovalau	Levuka	Arovudi, Buresala, Bureta, Cawaci, Devokula, Draiba, Lovoni, Nacobo, Naikorokoro, Nasaumatua, Nasinu, Natokalau, Nauouo, Navuloa, Nukutocia, Rukuruku, Silana, Taviya, Toki, Toko, Vagadaci, Vatukaio, Viro, Visoto, Vuniivisavu, Vuma, Wainaloka, Waitovo	106.4	9100
Vatu-i-Cake			0.07	0
Wakaya Island	Wakaya	Batimadrai Point, Double Bay, East Point, Korolevu, Nautilus Beach, Rocky Point, Wakaya Lailai Point	9.25	600
Yanuca Lailai	Lost Island	Naqeledamudamu Point	0.525	10
Yanuca Levu	Yanuca		1.441	190

=== Mamanuca Islands ===
Island	Main Town or Capital	Other Towns	Area (km^{2})	Population
Mamanuca Islands	Solevu	Malolo Lailai, Mana, Tavua, Vomo, Yanuya	22.76	900
Beachcomber Island			0.033	1
Castaway Island			0.655	1
Eori			0.139	0
Kadavulailai			0.217	1
Kadomo			0.337	0
Malamala Island			0.046	0
Malolo	Solevu	Navasua, Yaro	10.189	500
Malolo Lailai			2.382	1
Mana Island			1.27	1
Matamanoa			0.115	1
Monu Island			0.755	0
Monuriki			0.424	0
Namotu			0.03	1
Nautanivono	Yadua		0.132	0
Navadra			0.847	0
Navini			0.041	1
Other	Mociu Island	Manalailai, (Nadi Island), Navula	0.082	382
Tavarua			0.115	1
Tavua Island			1.942	1
Tivua Island			0.03	1
Tivualailai			0.01	1
Tokoriki			0.866	1
Treasure Island			0.074	1
Vomo			0.97	1
Vomolailai			0.051	0
Vunivadra Island			0.018	1
Wadigi Island	Wadigi Island		0.022	1
Yanuya			0.968	1

=== Rotuma Group ===
Island	Main Town or Capital	Other Towns	Area (km^{2})	Population
Rotuma Group	Ahau		46.173	2150
Afgaha			0.047	0
Haf’liua			0.061	0
Hafhaveiaglolo			0.007	0
Hatana			0.041	0
Haua			0.031	0
Hauameamea			0.021	0
Husia			0.004	0
Rotuma	Ahau	Elsee, Elsio, Fafaisina, Fapufa, Feavai, Feavarere, Haga, Jolmea, Juju, Kalvaka, Lau, Lopo, Lopta, Losa, Maftoa, Marama, Mea, Melsaa, Motusa, Noatau, Oinafa, Paptea, Pepheua, Poiva, Salvaka, Saukama, Savlei, Sumi, Tuakoi, Tuai, Uanheta, Ujia, Upu, Utu, Ututu	44.9	2150
Solkope			0.32	0
Solnohu			0.096	0
Uea			0.645	0

=== Vanua Levu Group ===
Island	Main Town or Capital	Other Towns	Area (km^{2})	Population
Vanua Levu Group	Labasa	Savusavu, Bua	6261	138000
Buca Bay Islands			0.042	0
Cikobia-i-Ra			12.46	1
Dogodogo Island			0.19	0
Druadrua Island	Salevukoso	Delaivadra	3.91	200
East Macuata Coast Islands			7.65	1
Kia Island			1.69	1
Kioa	Salia	Lomanikoro, Matagi, Naba, Naumu, Niu Degree, Nukusa, Silver Bay, Soata, Tafatai Lasi, Taite, Temotu, Vunikura	19.32	400
Korolevu Island			1	0
Laucala	Laucala		12.4	300
Mali Islands			9.255	1
Matagi Island			0.97	1
Namena Lala			0.455	1
Navidamu Islands			32.72	1
Nukubati Islands	Nukubati		0.623	10
Other			0.271	1031
Qamea	Kocoma	Dreketi, Nadiodio, Naiviivi, Togo, Vatusogosogo, Waibulu	34.5	2182
Rabi Island	Tabwewa	Buakonikai, Tabiang, Uma	67.3	5000
Ringgold Isles	Qelelevu (Nalutu)	, Nanuku, Nukubalati, Yanuca	6.12	50
Taveuni	Waiyevo	Bouma, Deleni, Gacaavulu, Kanacea, Korovou, Lavena, Matei, Naqara, Naselesele, Navakawau, Salialevu, Somosomo, Soqulu, Vuna, Wairiki, Welagi	434.5	9000
Vanua Levu	Labasa	Bua, Nabiti, Nadivakarua, Nailou, Sasa, Savusavu, Solevu, Wainigadru	5587.1	120000
Viani Coast Islands			0.78	6
Viubani Islands			0.284	2
Vorovoro			0.43	1
West Macuata Coast Islands	Macuata-i-Wai	Cukini, Nagano, Nukunuku, Talailau	15.93	10
Yadua			14.31	1
Yadua Tabu			0.7	0

=== Viti Levu Group ===
Island	Main Town or Capital	Other Towns	Area (km^{2})	Population
Viti Levu Group	Suva	Nadi	10478.6	697000
Acuilau Island			0.283	1
Bau (island)	Bau	Lasakau, Soso	0.1	300
Beqa	Dakuibeqa	Dakuni, Lalati, Naceva, Nawaisomo, Raviravi, Rukua, Soliyaga	37.5	3500
Beqana Island			0.92	1
Goma Island			0.342	1
Malake island			4.887	1
Naigani			2.01	1
Namuka Island			0.198	1
Nananu-i-Cake			2.43	1
Nananu-i-Lailai			0.055	1
Nananu-i-Ra	Nananu-i-Ra		2.982	40
Nanuyakoto Island			0.034	2
Nukuivovo Island			1.19	0
Nukulau			0.1	0
Other	Nanuku	Macuata, Motoriki	3.341	22133
Robinson Crusoe Island			0.125	1
Serua Island			0.045	1
Toberua Island			0.023	1
Tovu Island			0.535	1
Ugaga Island			0.042	1
Vatulele	Taunovo	Bouwaqa, Ekubu, Lomanikaya	30.72	1010
Viti Levu	Suva	Ba, Lautoka, Nadi, Naimasimasi, Nausori, Navua, Rakiraki, Sigatoka, Tavua	10388	670000
Viwa Island (Viti Levu)			0.85	1
Yanuca Island			1.888	1

=== Yasawa Islands ===
Island	Main Town or Capital	Other Towns	Area (km^{2})	Population
Yasawa Islands	Nabukeru	Somosomo, Nacula, Yalobi	154.24	6000
Drawaqa			0.711	1
Kuata			1.483	1
Matacawalevu,	,		9.948	1
Nacula	Nacula	Malakati, Nasisili, Navotua	22	3300
Nanuya Balavu			0.886	1
Nanuya Lailai	Enedala	Blue Lagoon Beach, Narukuniyau Point	1.247	50
Nanuya Levu	Nanuya Levu	Natagalobe Point, Devils Beach, Turtle Island beach	1.653	90
Naucacuvu Island,	,	,	0.514	1
Naviti	Somosomo	Geleni, Gunu, Kese, Malevu, Marou, Muaira, Nasoqo, Natuvalo, Soso	35.03	1000
Navitilailai Islands			0.4	6
Other	Vawa Island	Jililiva, Kubulau Island, Narara Island, Yalewa Kalou, Yawini Island	3.479	374
Round Island			0.01	0
Sawa-i-Lau			1.246	0
Tavewa	Tavewa	Coralview Beach, Korosavuka Point, Seserakinalawa Point	1.652	50
Viwa Island			4.602	1
Waya Island			22.43	1
Wayasewa			6.53	1
White Rock			0.01	0
Yaqeta	Yaqeta		7.615	1
Yasawa	Nabukeru	Bukama, Tamusua, Teci, Yasawa-i-Rara	32.547	1120

== See also ==
- Geography of Fiji
