= Nanuya Lailai =

Island in Fiji

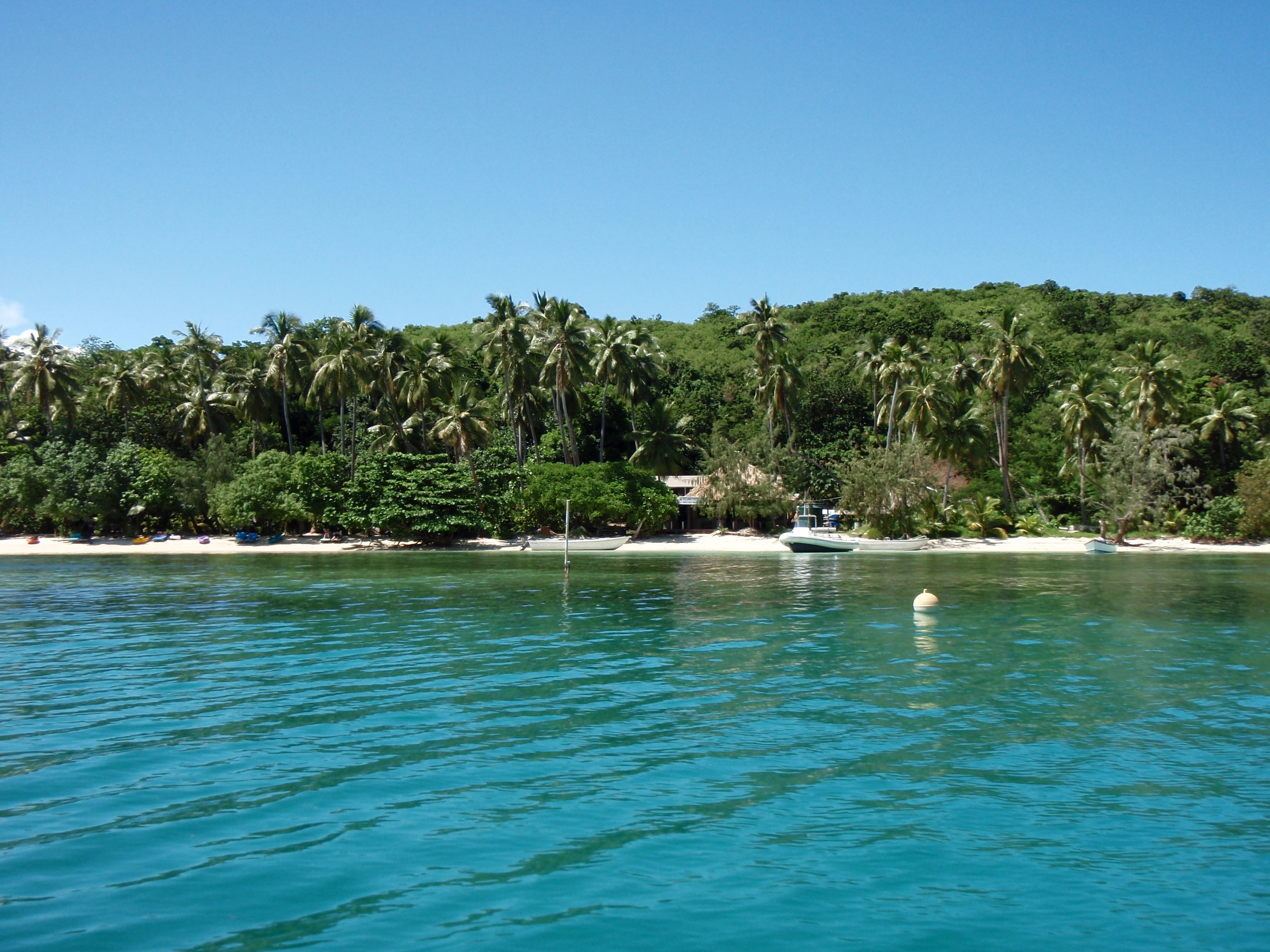
- The northwestern beach on Nanuya Lailai, showing the dense tropical vegetation on the island.

- Location within Fiji

Geography
- Location: South Pacific Ocean
- Coordinates: 16.9459487°S 177.3686806°E
- Archipelago: Yasawa Islands

Administration
- Fiji
- Division: Western Division
- Province: Ba
- District: Yasawa
- Largest settlement: Enendala

Nanuya Lailai is an island of the Yasawa Group in Fiji. It is located north of Nanuya Levu, which served as a location for the film The Blue Lagoon, separated by a narrow channel.

A beach on the west of the island is leased by Blue Lagoon Cruises, nearby is the island's one luxury resort. The small settlement of Enendala is at the base of a hill on the island's eastern beach. Seven families, all related and with family connections to Naisisili Village on Nacula Island, live there. They operate a small number of backpacker hostels.
