= Kuata =

Island of Fiji

- Island
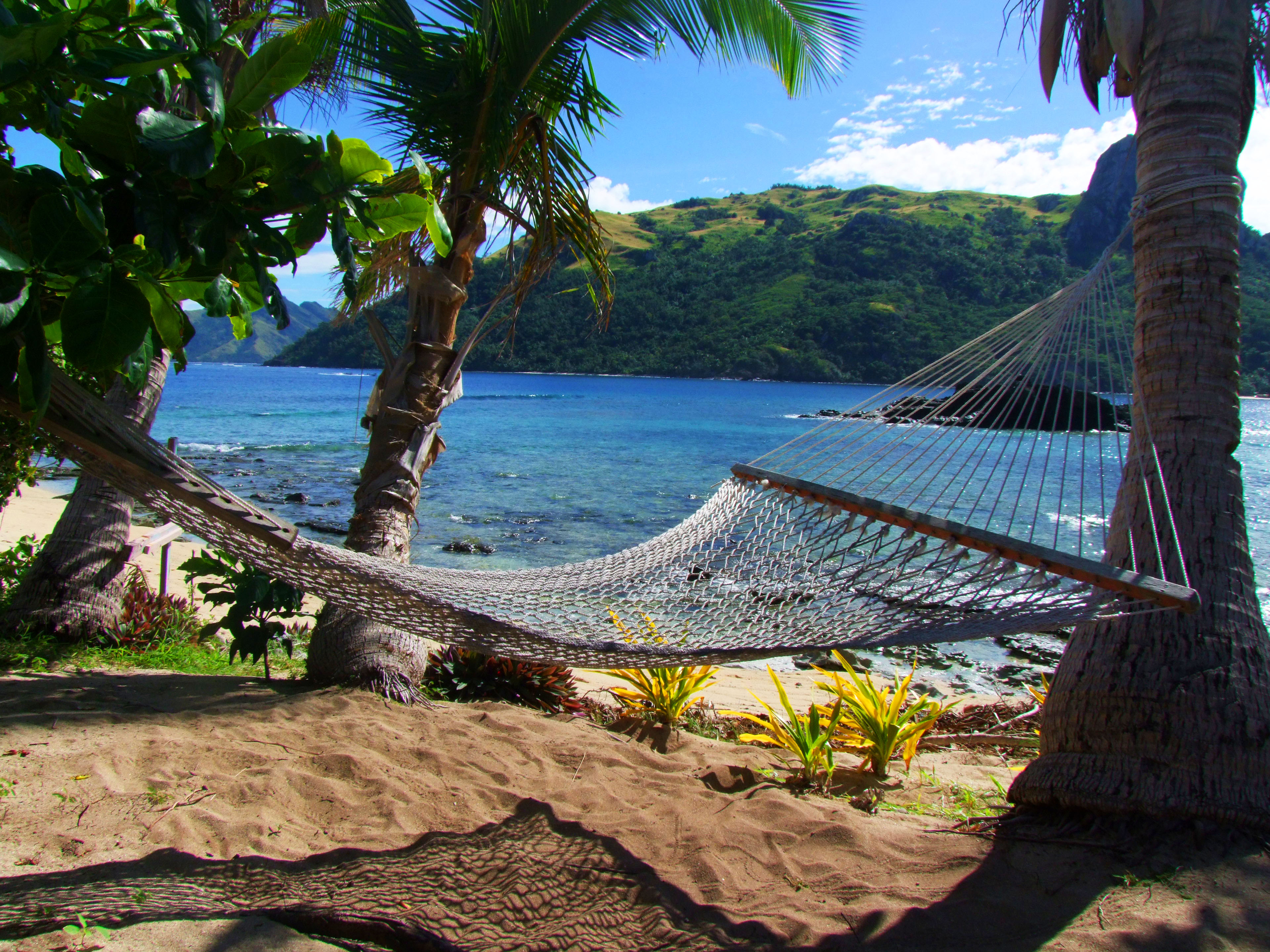
- Hammock on the island of Kuata

- Location within Fiji
- Coordinates: 17°22′19″S 177°08′10″E
- Country: Fiji
- Island group: Yasawa Group
- Division: Western
- Province: Ba Province
- District: Vuda

Area
  - Total: 1.48 km^{2} (0.57 sq mi)
- Elevation: 3.0 m (10 ft)

Kuata is an island of the Yasawa Group in Fiji's Ba Province. It is located about 41 kilometers off the coast of Viti Levu, at an average elevation of 10 meters above the sea level.
