= Waya Island =

Island of Fiji

Waya
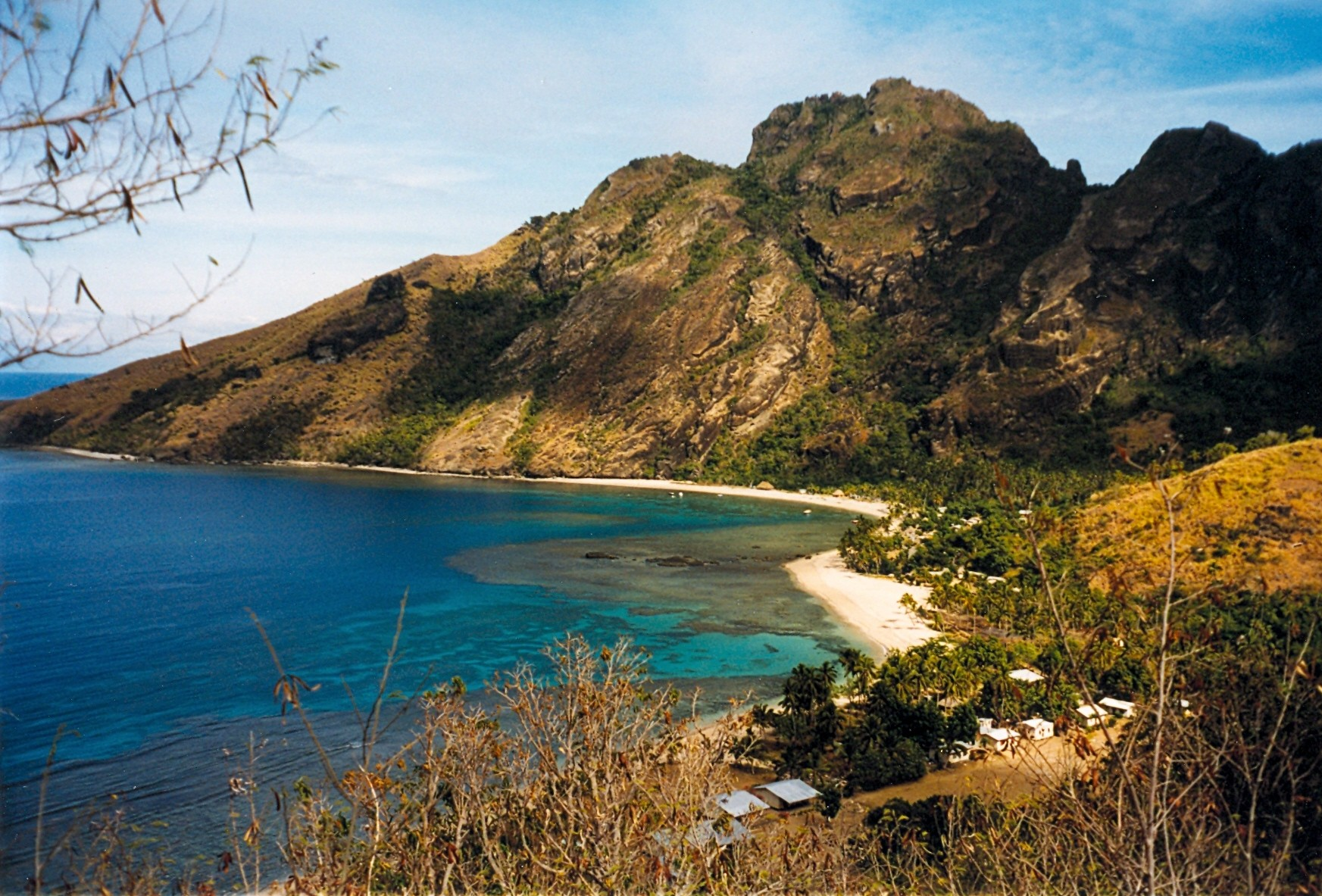
- Bay of Yalobi

- Location in Fiji

Geography
- Location: Pacific Ocean
- Coordinates: 17.2844°S 177.1273°E
- Archipelago: Yasawa Islands
- Area: 22 km^{2} (8.5 sq mi)
- Length: 6 km (3.7 mi)
- Width: 4 km (2.5 mi)
- Highest elevation: 571 m (1873 ft)

Administration
- Fiji
- Division: Western
- Province: Ba
- Tikina: Naviti

Demographics
- Population: 400

Waya is an island in the southern part of the Yasawa Islands of Fiji. The island is part of Ba Province in the country's Western Division. Waya lies about 40 kilometres (25 mi) from Lautoka.

== Geography ==
Waya is densely wooded with abundant natural water springs. There are four villages: Nalauwaki, Natawa, Waya Levu and Yalobi.

The island has the highest point in the Yasawa Group, at 571 metres (1,873 ft). Another island peak is 500 metres (1,600 ft) tall.
