= Naviti =

Island in Fiji

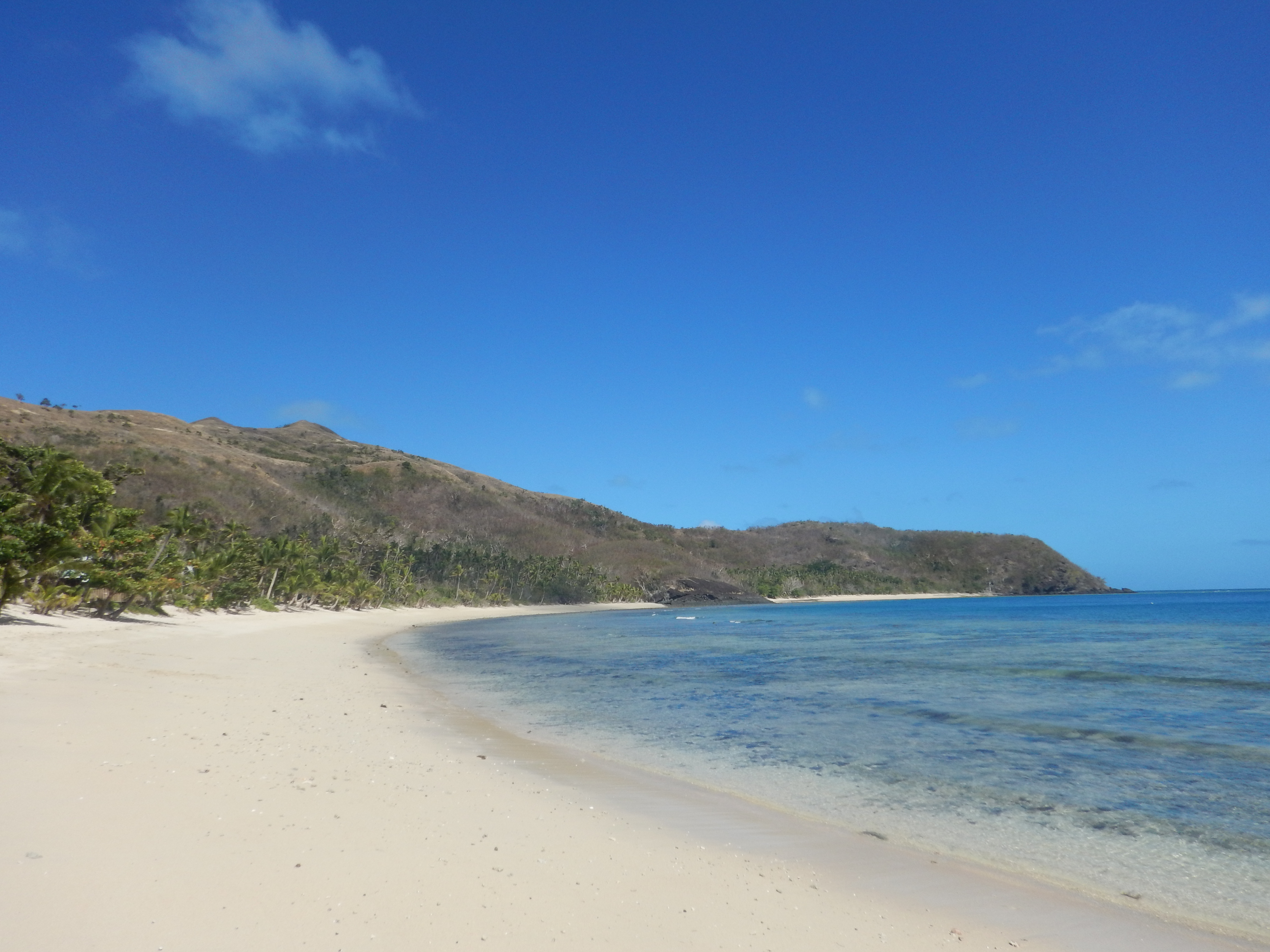
- Naviti island

- Location within Fiji

Geography
- Location: South Pacific Ocean
- Coordinates: 17.1163102°S 177.2012693°E
- Archipelago: Yasawa Islands
- Area: 33 km^{2} (13 sq mi)
- Highest elevation: 388 m (1273 ft)

Administration
- Fiji
- Division: Western Division
- Province: Ba
- Largest settlement: Soso

Naviti (pronounced [naˈβitʃi]) is a volcanic island and tikina in the Yasawa Group, in the Western Division of Fiji. Located at 17.13° South and 177.25° East, Naviti covers an area of 33 square kilometres (13 sq mi), with a maximum elevation of 388 metres (1,273 ft). It is the largest of the Yasawa Islands.

The Island is covered in dense tropical dry forests, with an abundance of mangrove trees. The island has been planted greatly with coconut palm trees. Naviti has a humid, tropical climate and remains a target for tropical cyclones, the last one being Cyclone Winston in February 2016.

The first known European to visit Naviti was William Bligh in 1789, before experiencing mutiny on his ship, HMS Bounty.

There are several villages based on Naviti Island, including Soso, Kese, Gunu, Somosomo, Marou, Muaira, Malevu, and Nasoqo. Soso is a chiefly village, which is home to the current chief or "ratu". Each village is interconnected by several trails. Naviti Island is also home to the Yasawa High School, the only high school in the Yasawa Islands, although there are kindergartens and primary schools in most villages. The main economic activity is centred on resort hotels, and several of them are found around the island. Naviti Island is also a popular base for voluntourism.

== Photos of Naviti ==
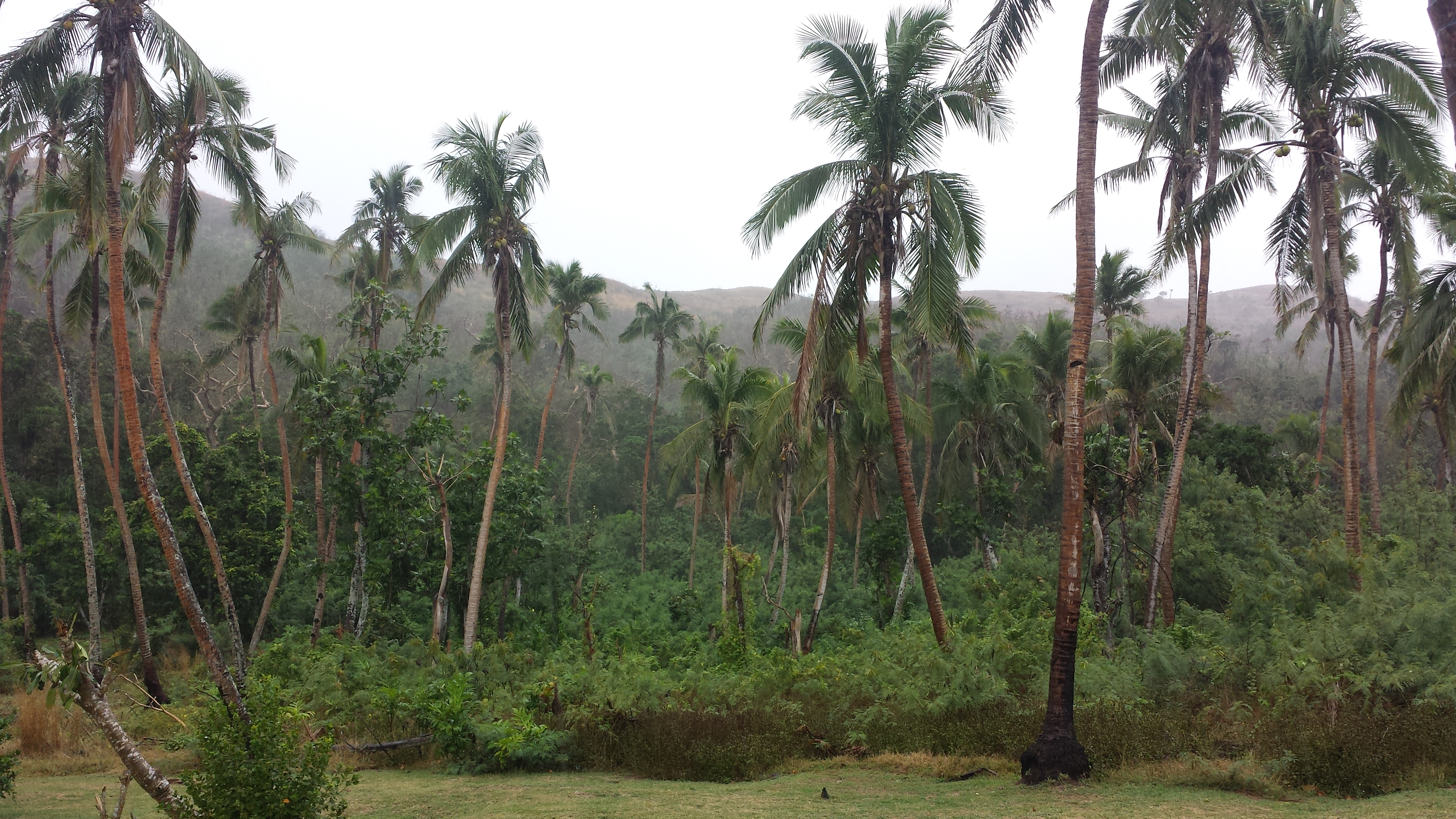
Palm trees.

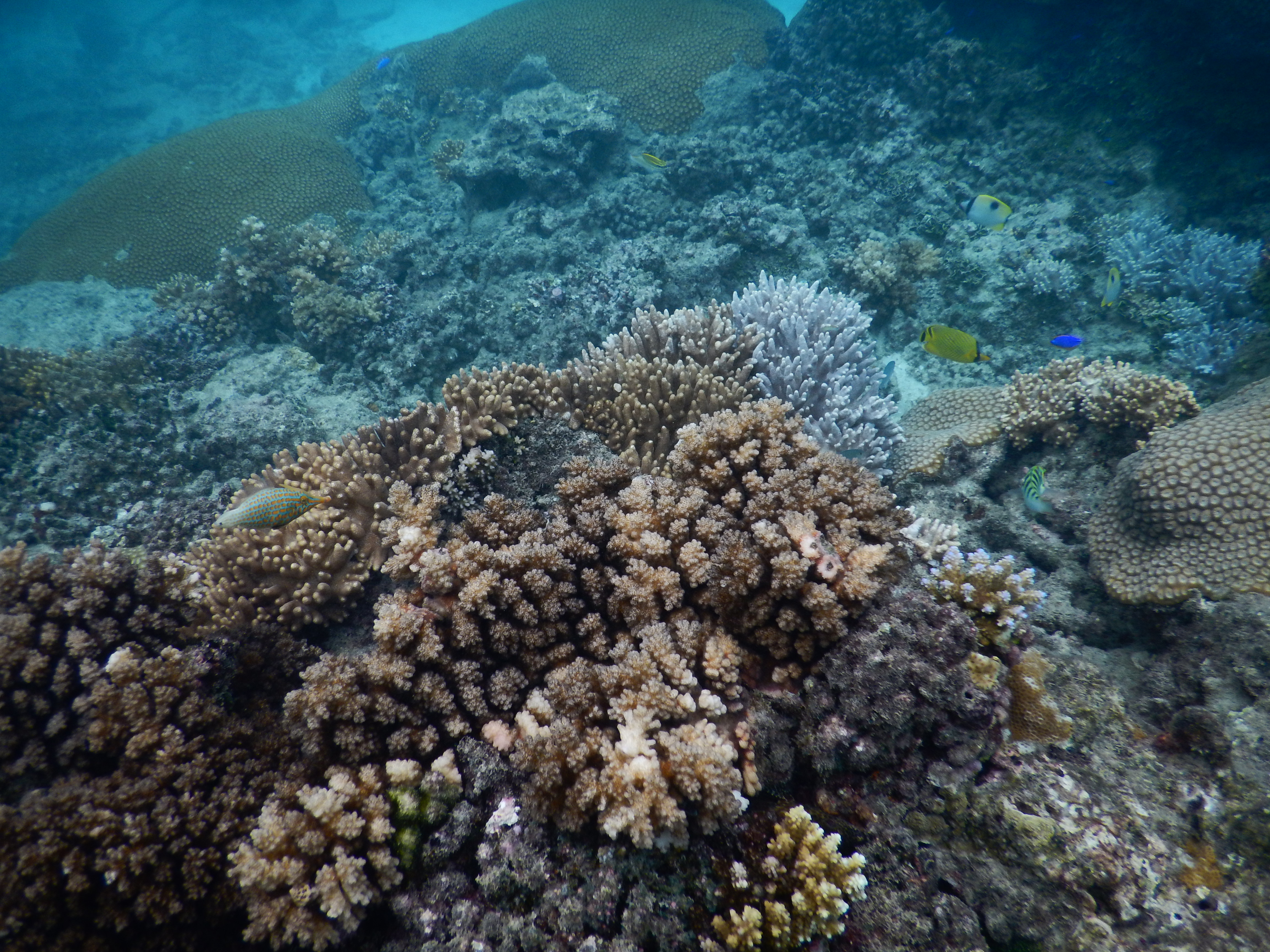
Corals at the west coast.

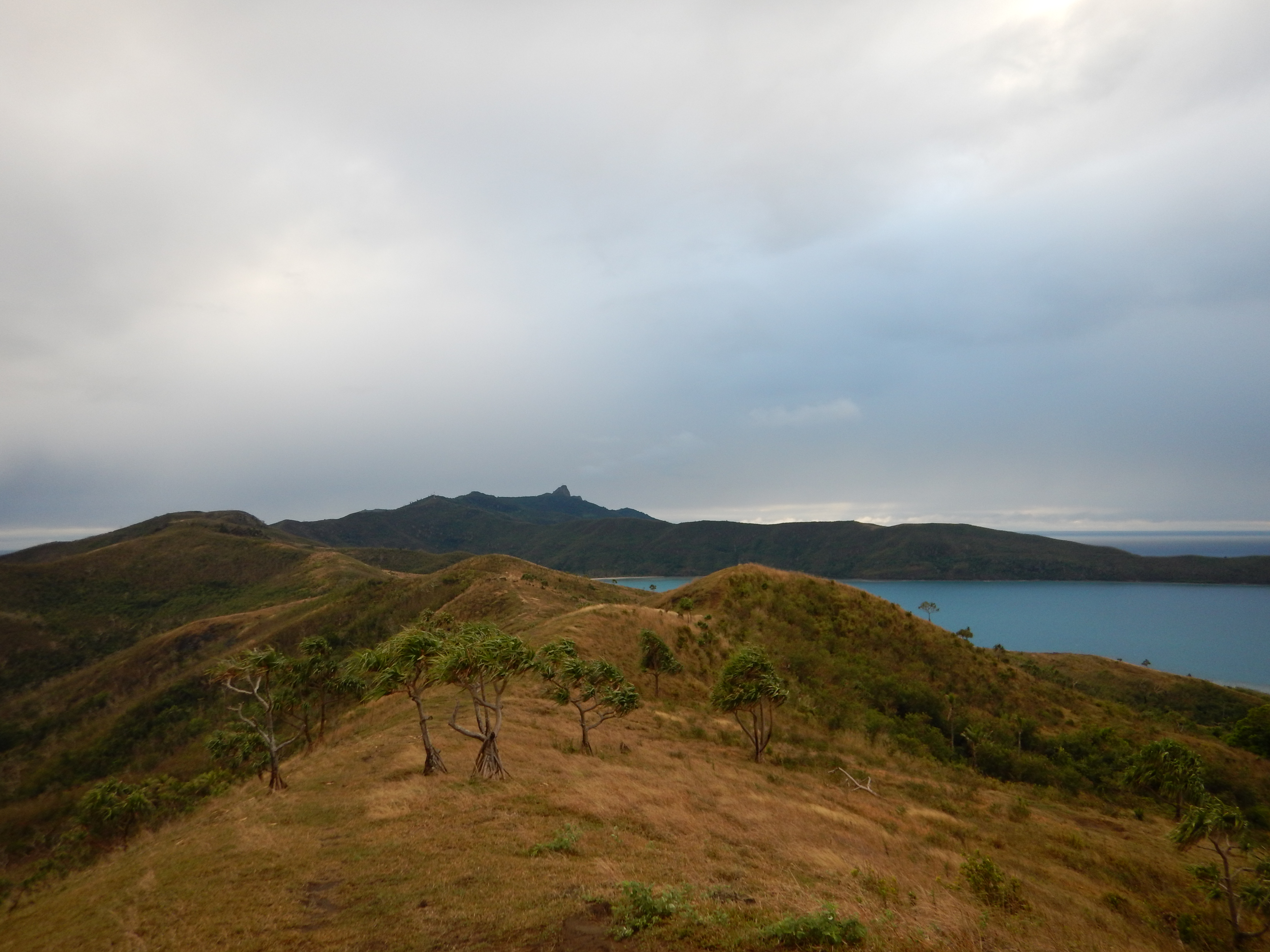
View from the ridge path in southern Naviti.

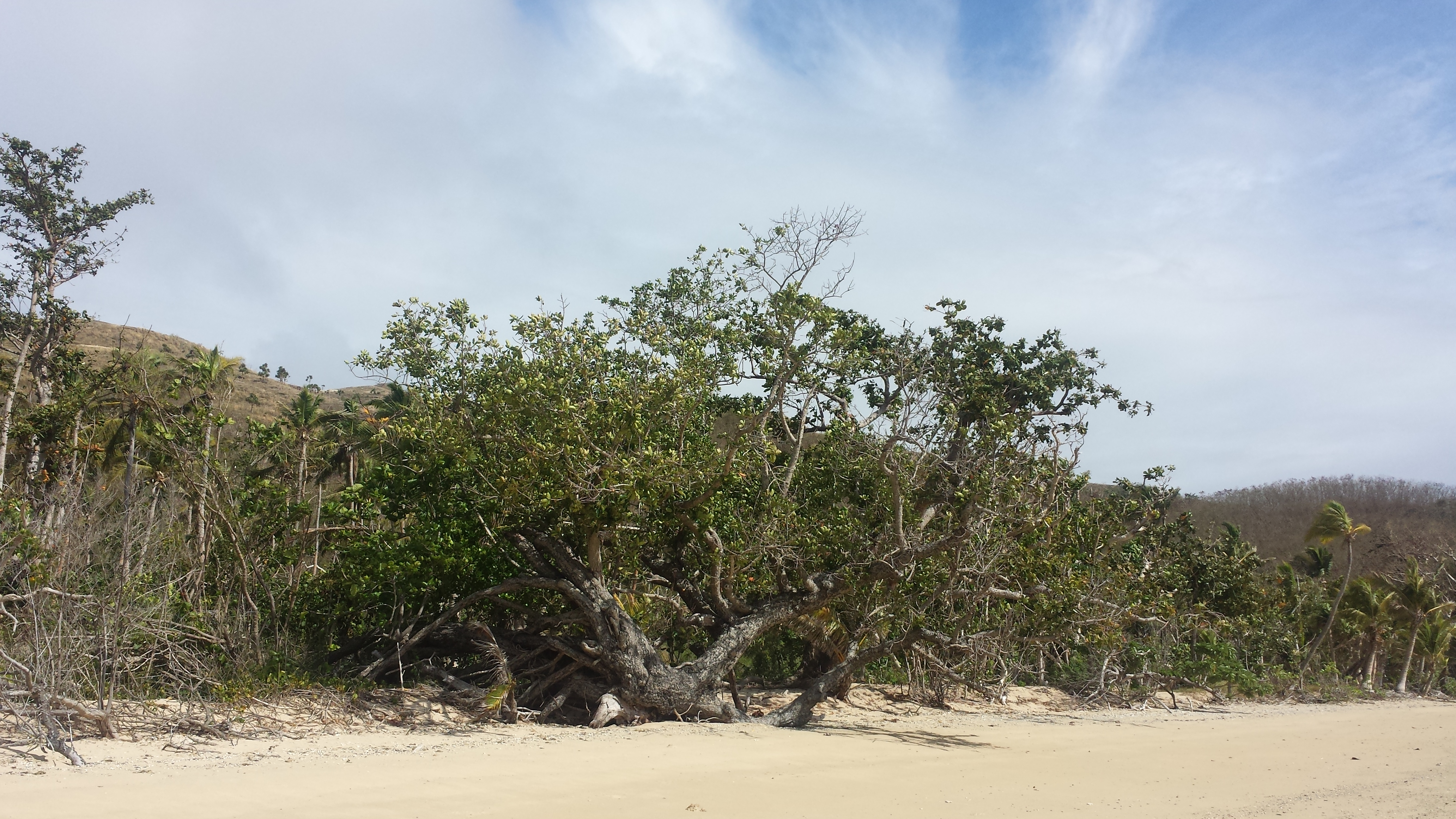
Beach on the west coast.

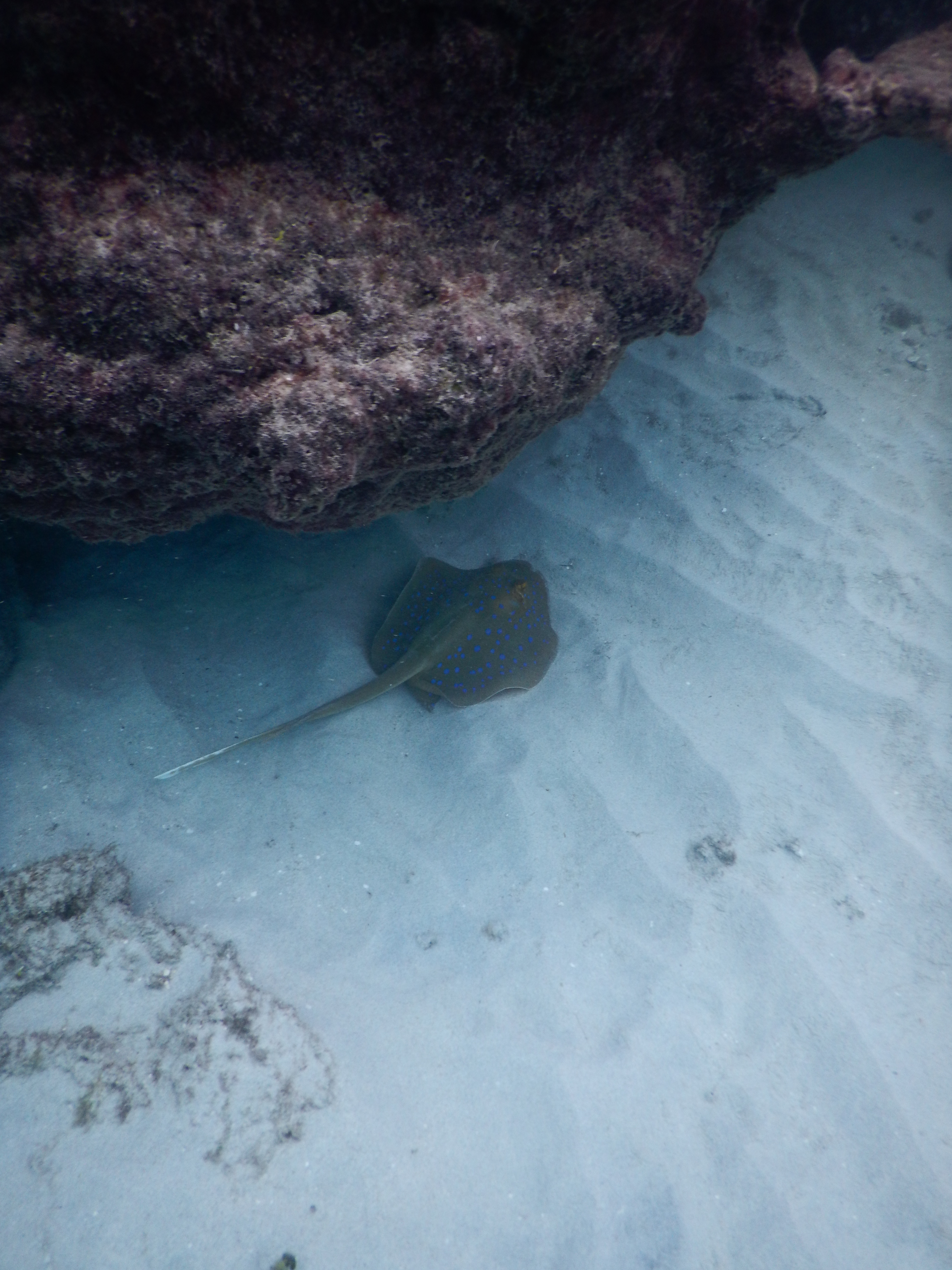
Stingray.

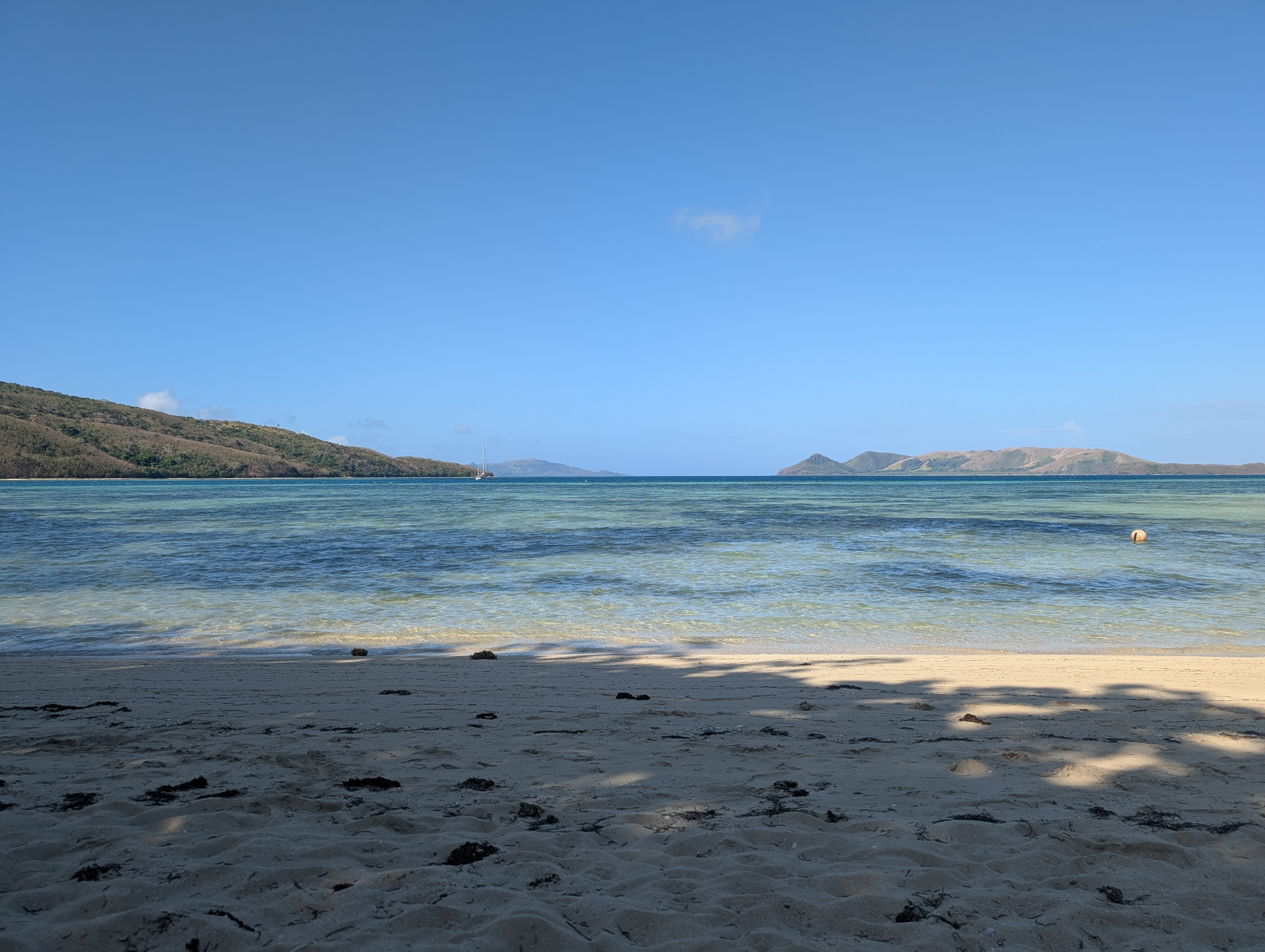
Beach on northern side of Naviti Island
