= Nacula =

Island in Ba Province, Fiji

Native name: Nacula
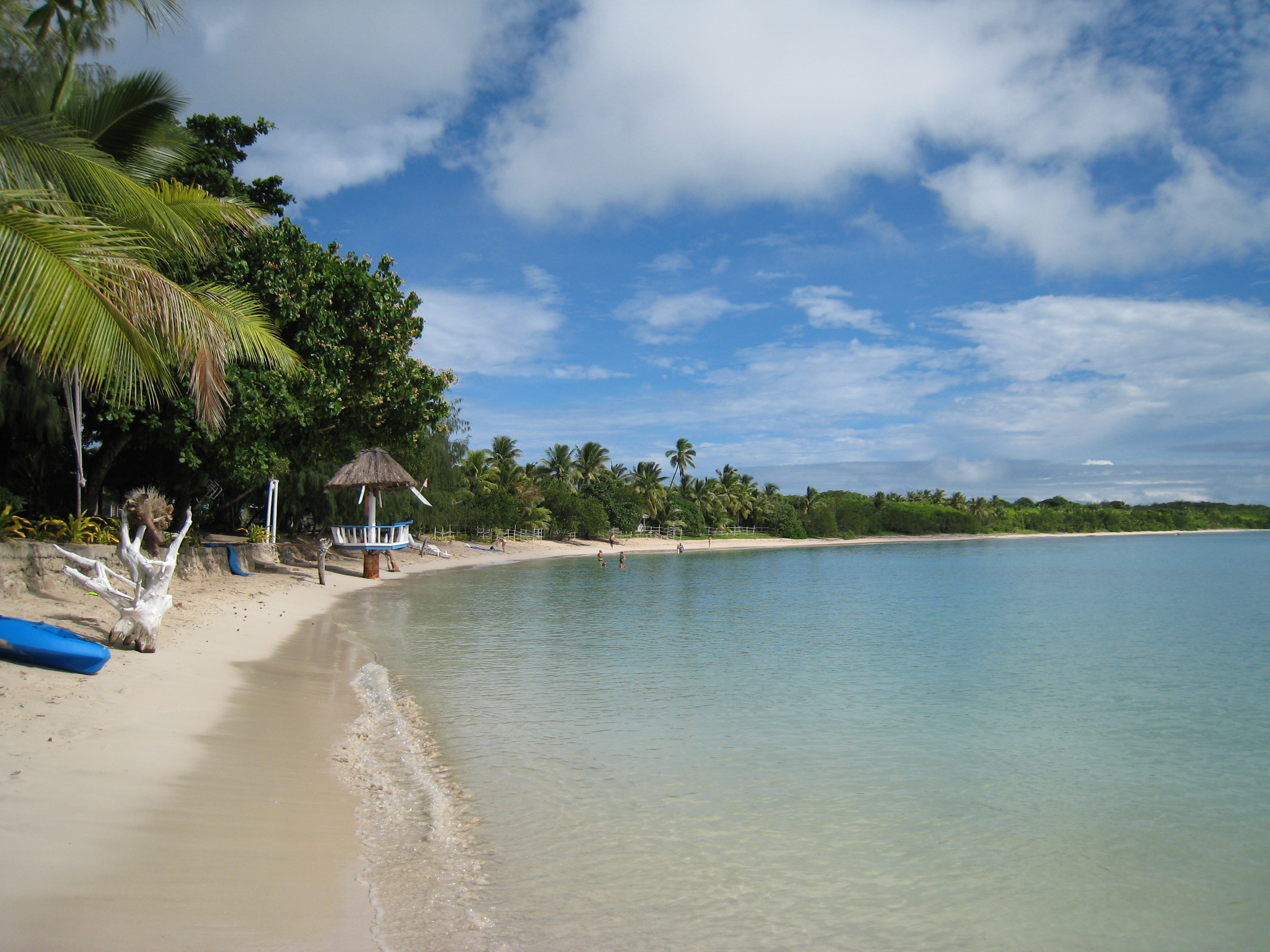
- A beach on Nacula

- Location within Fiji

Geography
- Location: South Pacific Ocean
- Coordinates: 16°53′S 177°25′E
- Archipelago: Yasawa Islands
- Total islands: 1
- Major islands: 1
- Area: 21.7 km^{2} (8.4 sq mi)
- Highest elevation: 243 m (797 ft)
- Highest point: 243

Administration
- Fiji
- Division: Western Division
- Province: Ba Province
- District: Yasawa

Demographics
- Population: c. 600 (2026)

Nacula is a hilly and volcanic island of the Yasawa Group in Fiji's Ba Province. It is the third-largest and is the second-farthest north in the group of islands.

There are 4 resorts on the island called Blue Lagoon Beach Resort, Safe Landing, Oarsman Bay Lodge and Nabua Lodge. Tourism is the main source of income on the island.

Nacula Island has 4 native villages, in descending order of size; Nacula village, Malakati village, Naisisili village and Navotua village.

The island's beaches have turquoise blue, gin-clear lagoons and are popular snorkeling and diving sites.

== Gallery ==
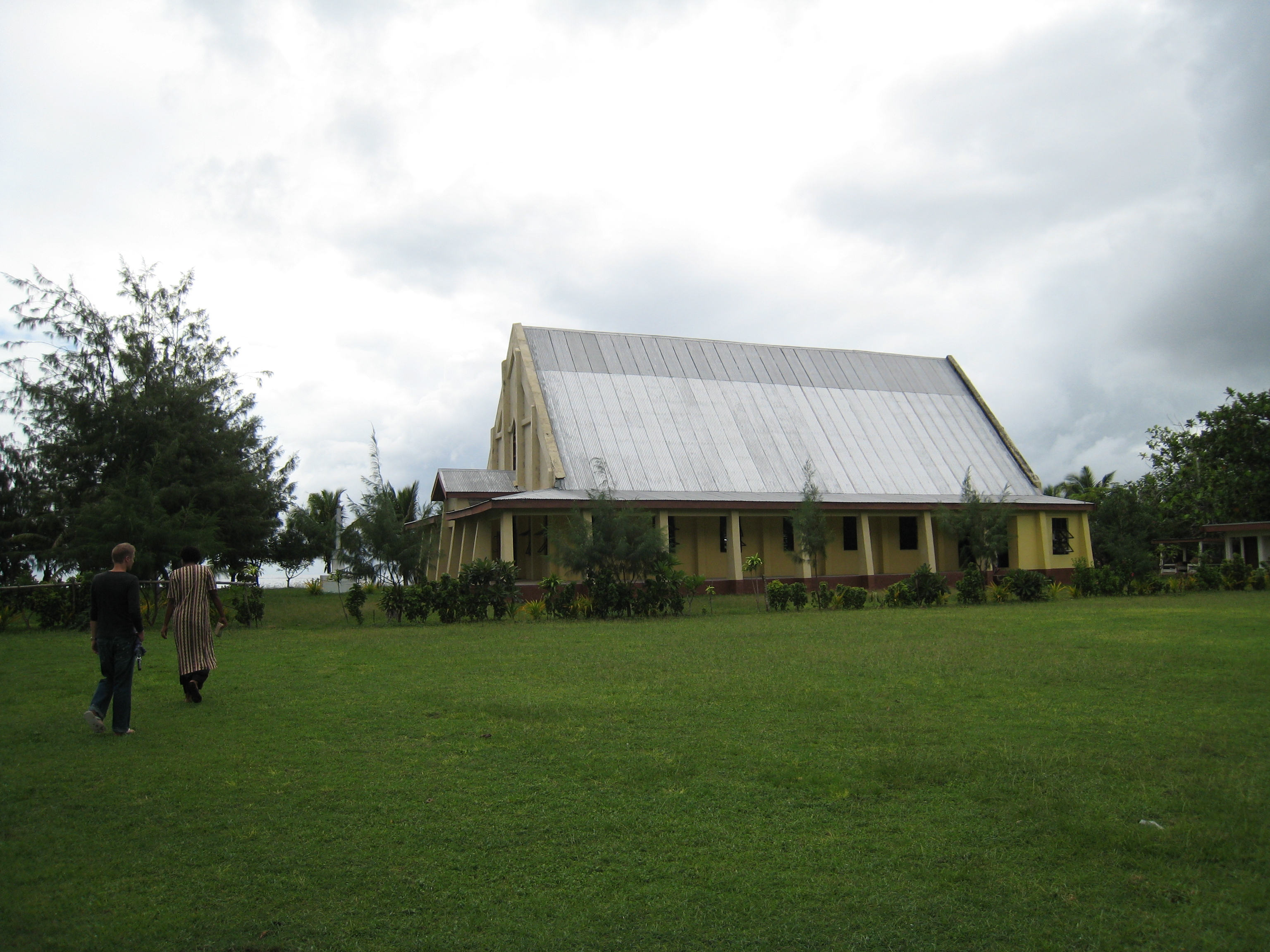
The local church on Nacula

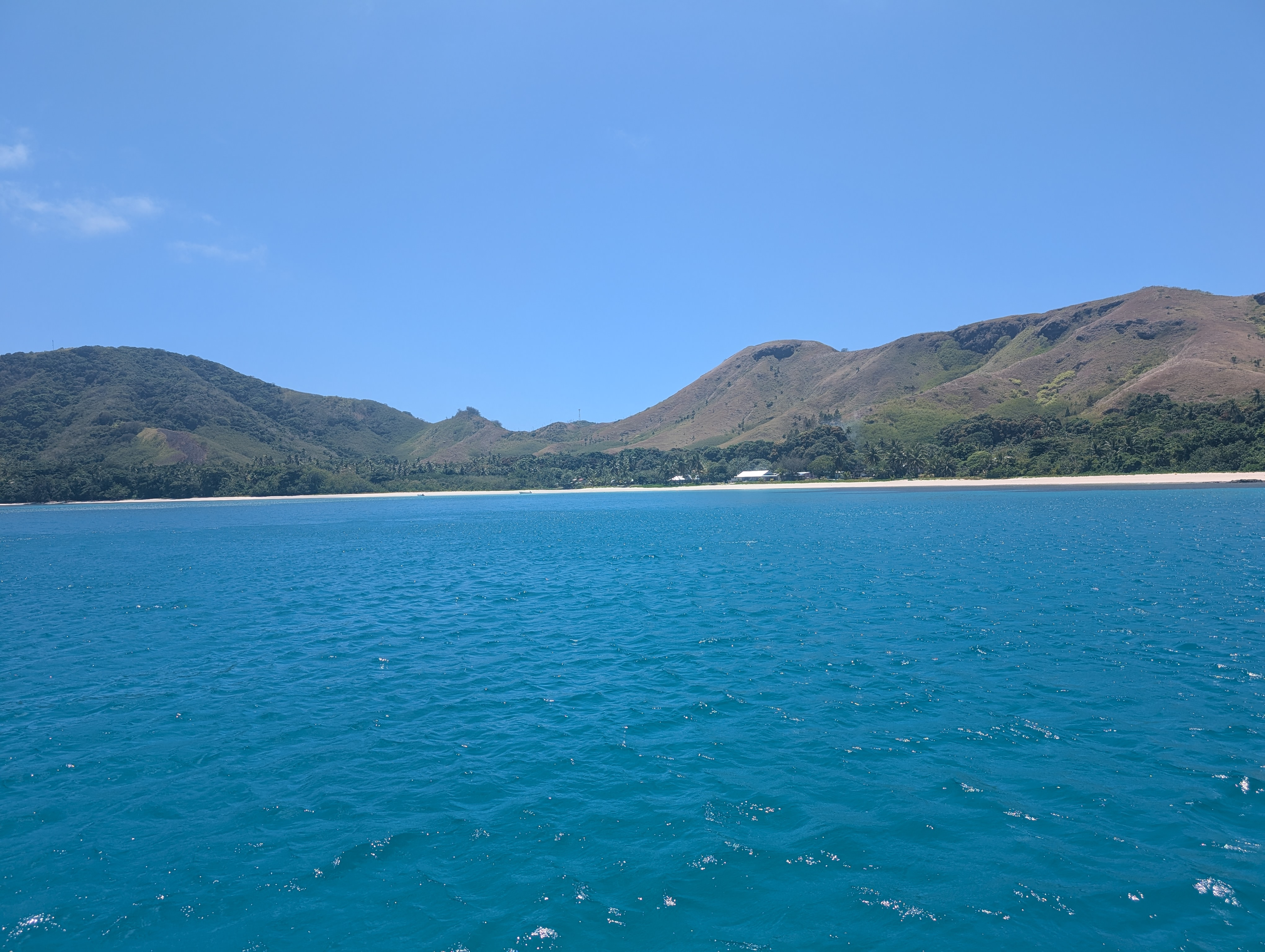
Beach and cove at Nacula Island
