= Nanuya Levu =

Private island in Yasawa Islands, Fiji

Native name: Turtle Island
- Location within Fiji

Geography
- Location: South Pacific Ocean
- Coordinates: 16.9621478°S 177.3640295°E
- Archipelago: Yasawa Islands

Administration
- Fiji
- Division: Western Division
- Province: Ba
- District: Yasawa

Nanuya Levu (pronounced [naˈnuja ˈleβu]) is a privately owned island of the Yasawa Group in Fiji and the site of the Turtle Island Resort, a sustainable luxury resort and also the locale for the romance adventure film The Blue Lagoon (1980). The island is owned by American entrepreneur Richard Evanson.
