= Tavewa =

Island in Ba, Fiji

- Location within Fiji

Geography
- Location: South Pacific Ocean
- Coordinates: 16.9252698°S 177.3490226°E
- Archipelago: Yasawa Islands
- Length: 3 km (1.9 mi)
- Width: 1 km (0.6 mi)

Administration
- Fiji
- Division: Western Division
- Province: Ba Province
- District: Yasawa

Tavewa is an island of the Yasawa Islands, measuring approximately 3 kilometres long by 1 km wide. It is part of the Nacula District that lies north-west of the Fijian island of Viti Levu.

== Island supplies and logistics ==
Tavewa does not have a pier; all supplies have to be loaded onto small landing boats from supply ships stopping between the islands. Depending on the arrival times of the supply boats and the tides, all goods have to be unloaded from the landing boats in places in the water in front of the beach. The residents unload and carry all goods from knee- to breast-deep water onto the beach. From there, the goods are either transferred into wheelbarrows or carried to their destination.

There are 4 motorised vehicles on Tavewa, Golf Cart, UTV and ATV, all privately owned. Tavewa has no roads, only paths.

Diesel & Fuel for generators is transported in drums, which explains why the generators are only used as required.

The regular supplies, with the tourists, arrive with the Yasawa Flyer (From Denarau, Nadi) or the Tavewa Seabus (From Lautoka Wharf), which operate a daily water-bus service between the mainland of Viti Levu and Tavewa. Other supply boats exist that operate either on an infrequent-but-regular or ad-hoc basis.

There are three shared phone lines between Tavewa and the mainland. Marine radio is a common communication platform. Both Vodafone and Digicel have a tower on the island however Mobile reception is patchy and unreliable. Some residents have Starlink.

=== Drinking water ===
Drinking water is a precious resource. Drinking water for tourists is brought in plastic bottles on the supply boats or caught in Rainwater tanks. The large number of non-degradable plastic bottles that are land-filled on the relatively small island are expected to cause environmental problems in the future.

== Tourism ==
The island is not very highly developed, affording visitors a realistic insight into the Fijian and Pacific Islands lifestyle.

Tavewa is not connected to any centralised power grid. The resorts on the island operate their own power supplies consisting of diesel-powered generators & Solar. These generators are only used on demand, usually starting at sunset. At around 10:00 pm the generators are shut down, and campfires and lanterns produce light.

The few cooling facilities rely on ice-blocks, which are regenerated while the generators are on.

=== Resorts ===
There are three resorts on Tavewa:

- Coconut Beach Resort
- Natabe Retreat
- Coral View Resort

And

- South Sea Kayak Camping Ground (April to November only for customers booking with that company)

== Local population ==
The island's people support themselves mainly by tourism. In addition to Tavewa residents, the population includes many resort staff who commute from nearby islands in the Yasawa group or from Nadi.

== Transport ==
Tavewa can be regularly reached either by the Yasawa Flyer ferry, Tavewa Seabus, Helicopter or seaplane.

The vast majority of tourists and supplies arrive on the Yasawa Flyer. It takes the Flyer about 5 hours to travel between Nadi and Tavewa, with several stops at the island resorts in-between.
