= Magodro =

Tikina in Ba Province Fiji

Magodro is a tikina in Fiji's Ba Province. According to the 2017 census, the district had a population of 4,806 inhabitants.

== Villages ==
The Fiji Bureau of Statistics recognizes 14 villages and 11 settlements outside of those villages in Magodro.

| Village | Population | Coordinates |
|---|---|---|
| Bukuya Village | 660 | 17°46′31.8″S 177°45′24.4″E |
| Nadevo Village | 127 | 17°49′55.8″S 177°46′30.2″E |
| Nadrugu Village | 76 | 17°42′38.5″S 177°44′42.9″E |
| Nalotawa Village | 30 | 17°38′24.2″S 177°36′25.4″E |
| Nadrugu Village | 76 | 17°42′38.5″S 177°44′42.9″E |
| Nanuku Village | 74 | 17°38′28.3″S 177°38′16.6″E |
| Nasivikoso Village | 470 | 17°49′21.5″S 177°43′17.1″E |
| Navaga Village | 80 | 17°48′37.6″S 177°46′41.4″E |
| Navilawa Village | 113 | 17°48′37.6″S 177°46′41.4″E |
| Rara Village | 24 | 17°40′24.0″S 177°38′28.5″E |
| Tabalei Village | 165 | 17°45′04.2″S 177°45′40.0″E |
| Tabuquto Village | 80 | 17°45′10.3″S 177°46′23.3″E |
| Toge Village | 165 | 17°37′47.2″S 177°44′22.9″E |
| Tukurakii Village | 165 | 17°38′57.2″S 177°38′47.2″E |
| Yaloku Village | 165 | 17°39′46.2″S 177°37′22.2″E |

| Settlement | Population | Coordinates |
|---|---|---|
| Babridan Settlement | 660 | 17°46′31.8″S 177°45′24.4″E |
| Balevuto Settlement | 338 | 17.6477717°S 177.7194464°E |
| Bukuya, Edela Settlement | 20 | 17°47′10.8″S 177°47′28.5″E |
| Bukuya, Nawavu Settlement | 4 | 17°47′55.1″S 177°40′08.4″E |
| Dogosu Settlement | 81 | 17°39′55.83″S 177°42′41.26″E |
| Nacaci Settlement | 71 | 17.632556°S 177.7208668°E |
| Nadrugu, Laoro Settlement | 3 | 17°40′04.4″S 177°45′43.6″E |
| Nadrugu, Lomakovei Settlement | 7 | 17°40′03.9″S 177°47′06.6″E |
| Nadrugu, Nuku Settlement | 5 | 17°41′38.08″S 177°46′38.44″E |
| Namau Settlement | 408 | 17°36′10.66″S 177°47′25.61″E |
| Nanuku, Cerelali Settlement | 26 | 17°38′36.79″S 177°38′26.30″E |
| Nanuku, Naisau Settlement | 2 | 17°38′40.47″S 177°38′09.28″E |
| Nasivikoso, Kenani Settlement | 6 | 17°49′31.7″S 177°43′56.4″E |
| Nasivikoso, Narabaraba Settlement | 19 | 17°49′57.7″S 177°43′57.8″E |
| Navaga, Edela Settlement | 30 | 17°47′13.9″S 177°47′28.7″E |
| Nukuloa Settlement | 337 | 17°37′50.87″S 177°42′00.08″E |
| Tabataba Settlement | 452 | 17°37′18.99″S 177°41′00.95″E |
| Tabuquto, Bila Settlement | 117 | 17°41′37.5″S 177°46′38.2″E |
| Toge Settlement | 137 | 17°38′09.87″S 177°43′45.39″E |
| Toge, Narere Settlement | 2 | 17°38′46.55″S 177°44′07.31″E |
| Tukiraki Ciri Settlement | 2 | 17°39′02.48″S 177°38′40.48″E |
| Tukiraki, Natinia Settlement | 5 | 17°38′53.38″S 177°39′11.23″E |
| Tukuraki Settlement | 3 | 17°38′44.90″S 177°39′26.43″E |
| Vatawai Settlement | 144 | 17°39′10.59″S 177°41′30.72″E |
