= Yasawa =

Island in Fiji

Native name: Assawa
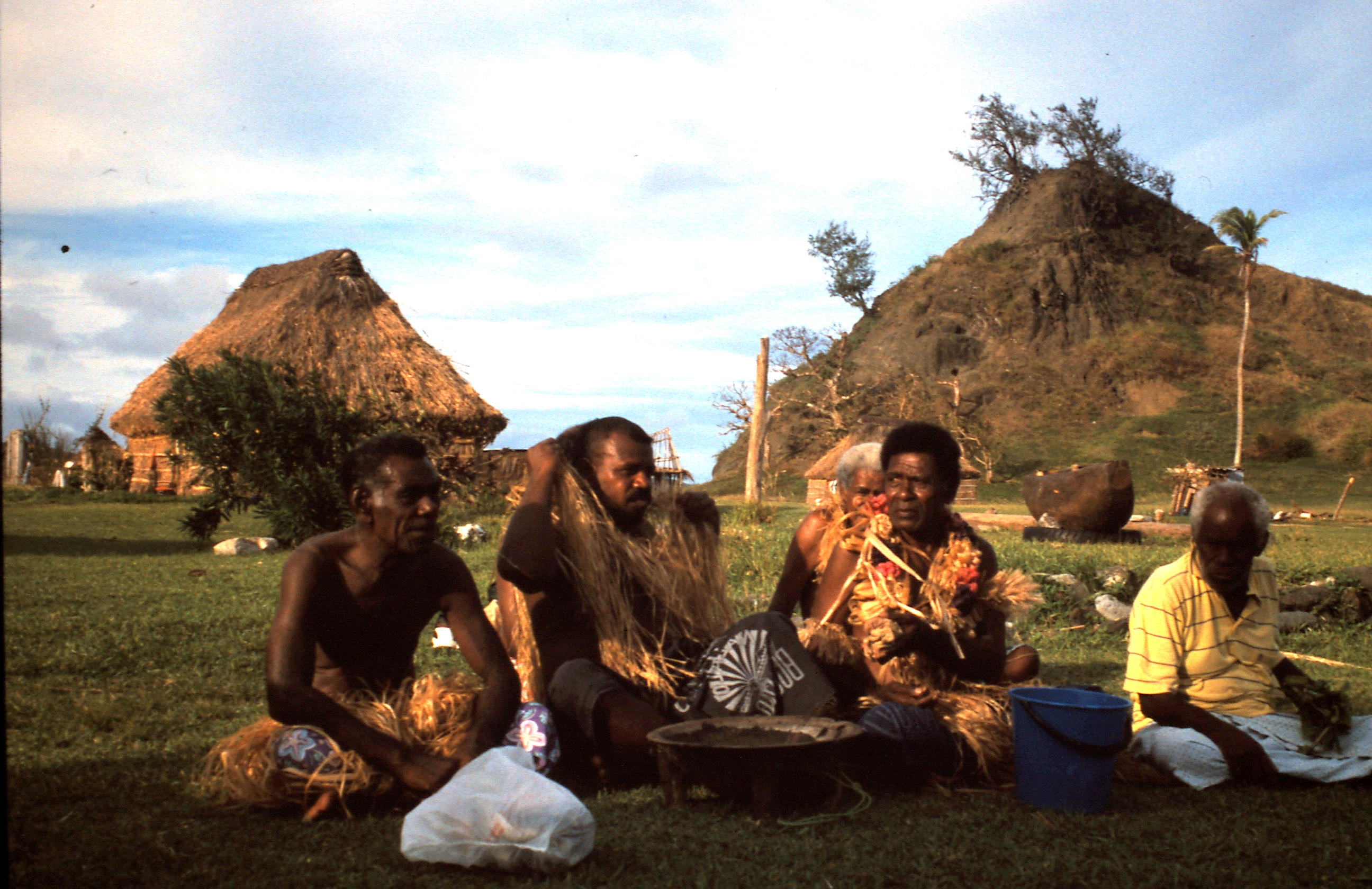

- Location within Fiji

Geography
- Location: South Pacific Ocean
- Coordinates: 16°46′33″S 177°30′50″E
- Archipelago: Yasawa Islands
- Area: 32 km^{2} (12 sq mi)
- Highest elevation: 244 m (801 ft)

Administration
- Fiji
- Division: Western
- Province: Ba

Demographics
- Population: 1,120 (1983)

Yasawa, also called Assawa and Ysava, is the northernmost large island of the Yasawa Group, an archipelago in Fiji's Western Division. Located at 17.00° South and 177.23° East, it covers an area of 32 square kilometres (12 square miles). It has a maximum altitude of 244 metres (801 feet) above sea level. The population was 1,120 in 1983.

The islands are served by the Yasawa Island Airport.
