= Vomo =

Island of the Mamanuca Islands, Fiji

- Interactive map of Vomo

Geography
- Location: South Pacific
- Coordinates: 17.4951225°S 177.2660769°E
- Archipelago: Mamanuca Islands
- Area: 0.87 km^{2} (0.34 sq mi)
- Highest elevation: 116 m (381 ft)

Administration
- Fiji
- Division: Western
- Province: Ba Province
- District: Vuda

Vomo is an island within the Mamanuca Islands of Fiji in the South Pacific. It is located on the cusp of the Yasawa Islands.

== Geography ==
Vomo is high volcanic triangular island with a beach along its western side. The island is a home of the private resort. The sister islet is Vomolailai or Little Vomo. Vomo is just a 15-minute helicopter ride from Nadi International Airport.
