= Waya's Passover =

Waya's Passover, also known as Waya Day, is a holiday celebrated in the Yasawa Islands of Fiji yearly on February 17th. It is in remembrance of the influenza pandemic of 1918 to 1920; though, some attribute the outbreak to one of measles. Its origin story involves a minister, Samuela Jeke, seeing words in the sand telling people to fast and pray in order to avoid disease. The people of the area were supposedly subsequently not affected. It is a holiday for the people of the area who feast and have a church service.

== See also ==
- Passover
