= Vomolailai =

Island of the Mamanuca Islands, Fiji

- Interactive map of Vomolailai

Geography
- Location: South Pacific
- Coordinates: 17.4814°S 177.25041°E
- Archipelago: Mamanuca Islands
- Area: 0.14 km^{2} (0.054 sq mi)
- Highest elevation: 61 m (200 ft)

Administration
- Fiji
- Division: Western
- Province: Ba Province
- District: Vuda

Demographics
- Population: 0

Vomolailai (also Vomo Lailai) is a tiny uninhabited islet within the Mamanuca Islands of Fiji in the South Pacific. The islands are a part of the Fiji's Western Division.

== Geography ==
Vomolailai (Little Vomo) lies just northwest of Vomo island.
