= Wailagi Lala =

Atoll in Lau Islands, Fiji

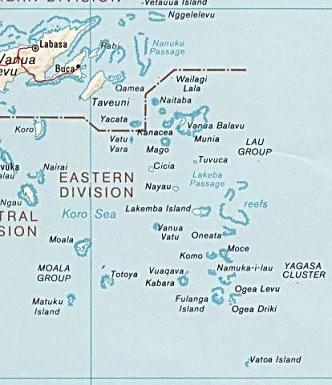

- Location within Fiji

Geography
- Location: South Pacific Ocean
- Coordinates: 16.7471295°S 179.1068887°W
- Archipelago: Northern Lau Islands
- Adjacent to: Koro Sea
- Area: 30 ha (74 acres)
- Highest elevation: 3 m (10 ft)

Administration
- Fiji
- Division: Eastern Division
- Province: Lau
- Tikina: Lau Outer Islands

Demographics
- Population: 0

Additional information
- Time zone: FJT (UTC+12)
  - Summer (DST): FJST (UTC+13)

Wailagi Lala (pronounced [waiˈlaŋi ˈlala]) is the northernmost outpost of Fiji's Lau Islands. This tiny atoll, with an area of just 30 hectares (74 acres) and rising no more than 3 metres (10 ft) above mean sea level, is situated at 16.45° South and 179.6° West. It is the only true atoll in Fiji.

Literally translated as "no water or rain", Wailagilala lies to the eastern sea border of the Fiji archipelago in the South Pacific, and is the gateway to Fiji for ships coming or going to Samoa through the Nanuku Passage. Its crystal-clear waters are attributed to its remote location and lack of terrestrial water run-off.

The island has an abandoned cast iron lighthouse, 95 feet (29 m) long, built about 1909. It is believed to have been prefabricated in England and shipped in sections to the South Pacific. The island has been uninhabited since the lighthouse was converted to automatic operation.

Dominated by its lighthouse, the sand island is surrounded by spectacular lagoon and coral reefs. The reef protecting the island has a deep, wide, fairly well marked pass that appears to have been blasted through it, allowing easy passage into the lagoon and the sandy anchorage just off the island.

The island is composed of carbonate sands and gravel, and beach-rock. Alexander Agassiz bored a hole there late in the 19th century. It passed through 15 metres (49 ft) of coarse sand with coral and shell fragments before reaching "yellow limestone", which continued to the end of the hole at 24 metres (79 ft). There are submerged terraces 5 metres (16 ft), 8 metres (26 ft) and possibly 25 metres (82 ft) below mean sea level, and marine notches 25 metres (82 ft) and possibly 45 metres (148 ft) and 60 metres (200 ft) below MSL.

The seabird nesting colony and marine ecosystem of the atoll contribute to its national significance as outlined in Fiji's Biodiversity Strategy and Action Plan.

The island was leased in early 2007 and will be developed as a luxury private retreat.

== See also ==
- Desert island
- List of islands
