= Kanacea =

Island in Fiji

Coordinates: 17°16′S 179°09′W

Kanacea Island
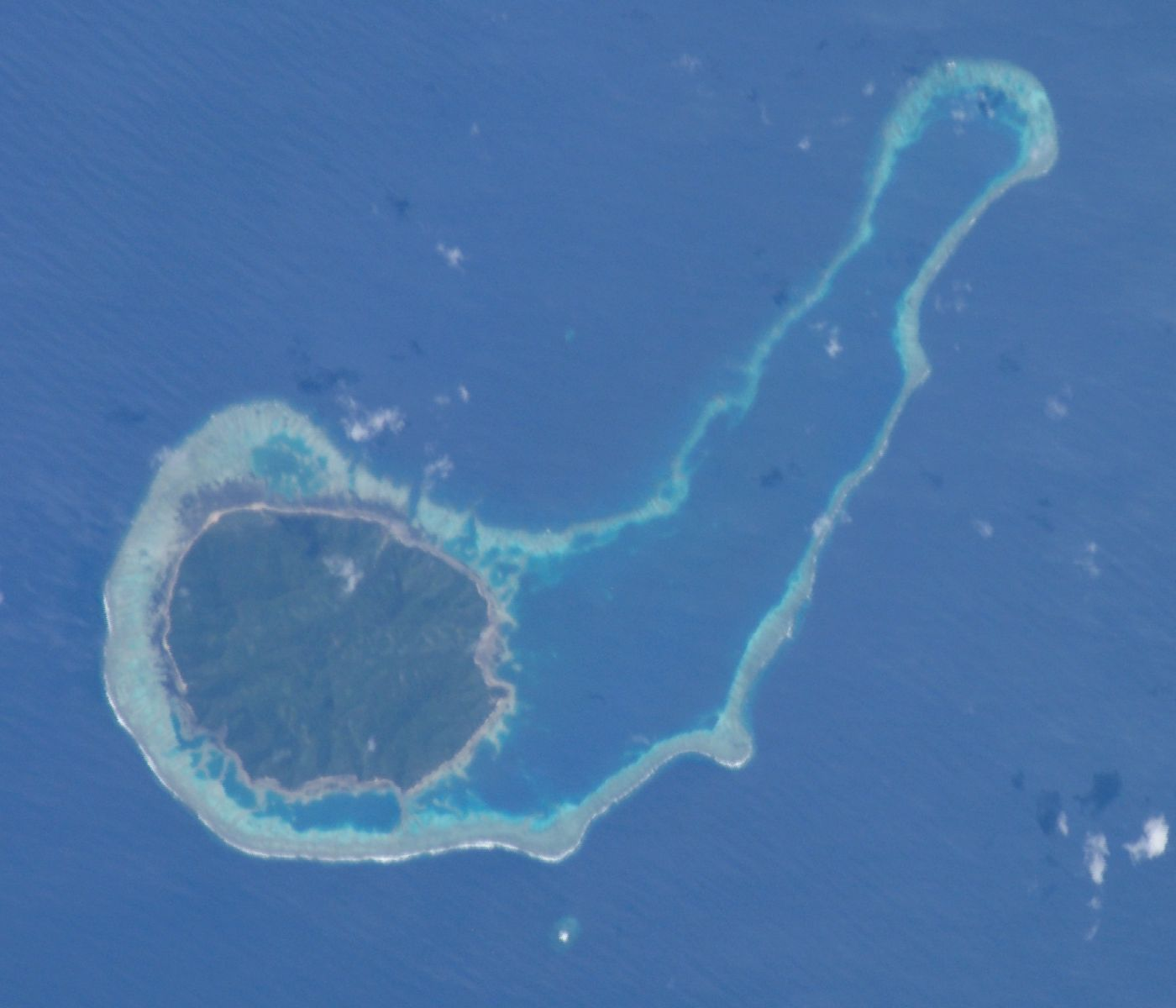
- NASA astronaut image of Kanacea Island, Lau Archipelago, Fiji

- Location within Fiji

Geography
- Location: Fiji
- Archipelago: Lau Islands
- Area: 12.48 km^{2} (4.82 sq mi)
- Highest elevation: 259 m (850 ft)

Administration
- Fiji
- Division: Eastern Division
- Province: Lau Province
- District: Lau Other Islands

Kanacea (pronounced [kanaˈðea]) (Kanathea) is a volcanic island with seven peaks in Fiji's Lau archipelago. It is 15 kilometres (9.3 mi) west of Vanua Balavu. Covering an area of 12.48 square kilometres (3,084 acres), it has a maximum elevation of 259 metres (850 ft).

The island features a coconut plantation and many streams, and is circled by great beaches and fringing reefs with a boat opening and a large lagoon on the northeastern side. Plantation buildings and a school remain.

Kanacea is privately owned. Its main economic activity was centered on copra and sugarcane, and it retains a coconut plantation.

== Controversy ==
In 1991, when the island of Kanacea, which the paramount chief of Cakaudrove, the Tui Cakau, had originally sold to a European settler in 1868, was sold by an Australian company, Carpenters (Fiji) Ltd., to an American company, the government persuaded Carpenters to pay compensation to the island's original landowners, Kanacea people, who had been relocated to the island of Taveuni at the time of the original sale. However, to the outrage of both the chief of Kanacea and the Tui Cakau, a number of Kanacea commoners demanded that the island be returned to its original landowners because the original sale by the Tui Cakau had been invalid. In response to the populist attack of Kanacea people's consultant Francis Waqa Sokonibogi on the Tui Cakau for having sold his people's land, the government and chiefs of Cakaudrove pressured the chiefs and people of Kanacea to distance themselves from Sokonibogi.

As reported in the Fiji Times, the Bauan chief Ratu William Toganivalu, who was minister for lands in the interim government, said that the Tui Cakau, Ratu Golea, had sold the island of Kanacea because Kanacea people had sided with Tongans in a war between the people of Cakaudrove and Tonga saying, “The Tui Cakau at that time owned all the land because he was the ‘Head Chief’ and for that reason he did not need the permission from anybody to sell the land" Ratu William reportedly said The government rejected Waqa's demand, and the government, chiefs of Kanacea, and Carpenters agreed that out of the F$6, 000,000 for which the island was sold, Carpenters would pay the sum of F$1,000,000 as compensation to the people of Kanacea.

This island was listed for USD 26,000,000.00
