= Nagigia Island =

Island in Fiji

Coordinates: 19°07.7′S 177°56.5′E

Nagigia
Native name: Denham Island
- Location within Fiji

Geography
- Location: South Pacific Ocean
- Archipelago: Kadavu Group
- Area: 0.11 km^{2} (0.042 sq mi)

Administration
- Fiji
- Division: Eastern Division
- Province: Kadavu
- District: Nabukelevu

Nagigia Island is an island located at the most south-western point of the Fiji Islands. It is also known on some charts and maps as Denham Island. The island has an area of 26 acres (11 ha), is privately owned and has a large sheltered lagoon suitable for snorkelling.

Nagigia Island lies off the coast of the western end of Kadavu Island, Fiji's fourth largest island where the village of Nabukalevu-Ira is situated.

The Nagigia Island Resort is located on the south east part of the island. The island has high tourism value with surf beaches and dive sites.
