= Hatana =

Islet in Rotuma, a dependency of Fiji

Coordinates: 12°28′48″S 176°57′42″E

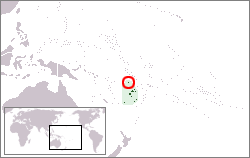
- Rotuma (dark green) in Fiji (light green)

- Location within Fiji

Geography
- Location: South Pacific Ocean
- Archipelago: Rotuma Group

Administration
- Fiji
- Division: Eastern
- Province: Rotuma
- Tikina: Ituʻtiʻu

Demographics
- Population: 0

Hatana Island is considered the most sacred or "haʻa" islet of the Rotuma Group, Fiji, commonly featuring in various Rotuman Creation myths.

== Rotuman mythology ==
The island's potency is connected to the supposed founder of Rotuma, Raho. Legend maintains that Raho, a Samoan chief, after fleeing his home island, "planted" the island of Rotuma with two baskets of sand, and was subsequently tricked out of his newfound paradise by a Tongan chief named Tokaniua. In a fit of pique, Raho climbed up Rotuma's old volcano, Mamfiri, and dug a stick into its peak, the dirt flying off becoming the surrounding islets of Hafliua, Hatana, Hafhaveiaglolo, Solkope and the Haua islands. Thus, Raho left the main island of Rotuma and made his home on the island of Hatana, with a bevy of maidens. He is presumed to have died there, given that there is a site on the island referred to as his burial place. There remain two small boulders, said to resemble two crouching figures, marking the burial places of the sau he rua, Tuimanuka and Famafu. Around these stand 27 smaller rocks in a circle, supposedly symbolising the 27 saʻsina (maidens) whose deaths were mandated upon the death of the King, presumably to attend to him in the after world. There is a small umefe (eating table) upon which people have left gifts of garlands, coins, alcohol and any other offering deemed precious enough to appease the God-King and warrant safe passage on the return voyage.

== Geography ==
Accessing the island of Hatana is a complicated process. Its landowners are the people of the village of Losa, district Ituʻtiʻu, on the west coast of the main island, and hence no one is allowed to land on the island without the permission of the Losa people, and must travel with a Losa villager in their party. Groups generally go to collect seabirds or their eggs, delicacies made all the more remarkable by the difficulty in process to procure them. However, groups do also go on day trips to visit the burial place of Raho, and picnic on the island.

The island is surrounded by a perimeter of high reef that boats cannot breach, meaning that to reach the island, travellers must disembark from their vessels at the edge of the reef and either swim or run along the coral to the land at a distance of around 50 metres. This requires careful timing: should one embark on the run or swim at the wrong moment, they can find themselves struck against the reef or a rock by the large waves that pound against the sides of the island.

Once on the island, given its sacred, taboo or haʻa status, there are various prohibitions which people cannot contravene. For example, visitors must not defile the island by relieving themselves on the land, and must do so into the sea. Also, any physical or even verbal act of insult, directed to the burial site, the ancestors associated with it or the people of Losa can cause the seas to become quite rough, and groups have been recorded as being stranded on the island for up to several days, until actions were taken to pacify the angry spirits.

== See also ==
- Desert island
- List of islands
