= Kadavu Province =

Province of Fiji

Coordinates: 19°03′S 178°15′E

- Province
- Interactive map of Kadavu Province
- Country: Fiji
- Division: Eastern Division

Area
  - Total: 478 km^{2} (185 sq mi)

Population (2017)
  - Total: 10,869
  - Density: 22.7/km^{2} (58.9/sq mi)

Kadavu Province (Fijian pronunciation: [kanˈdaβu]) is one of fourteen provinces of Fiji, and forms part of the Eastern Division, which also includes the provinces of Lau, Lomaiviti and Rotuma. Kadavu also belongs to the Burebasaga Confederacy, a hierarchy of chiefs from southern and western Fiji with Roko Tui Dreketi of Rewa as the paramount chief.

It consists of Kadavu Island, Ono Island, Galoa Island, Dravuni Island, Matanuku Island, Buliya Island, Nagigia Island, and a few other islands. Kadavu has a total land area of 408 square kilometers, with a population of 10,869 at the most recent census in 2017, making it the fourth least populous province.

The Kadavu group is volcanic in nature, the main island being Kadavu, which is 93 km long and varies in width from several hundred metres to 13 km, All its coasts are deeply indented, some bays biting so far into the land that they almost divide the island. One geographer has suggested that the shape of Kadavu resembles that of a wasp, with the head, thorax and abdomen linked by narrow waists.

Thus Vunisea (the administrative center), Namalata Bay and Galoa Harbor are separated by only a sandy isthmus standing a few meters above sea level; and at Vunisei the heads of Daku Bay and Soso Bay are within 1100 meters of each other, with only a low ridge between.

Kadavu is also the home of the second-largest living organism on Earth, the Great Astrolabe Reef, which lies along the southern side of the island and stretches from the northern part of the island, Ono island, to the southern tip of Kadavu Island, Muanasika Point near Nasau village. The edges of this reef are indicated by two lighthouses: the Solo Light House near Ono Island, and the Washington Lighthouse close to Nagigia Island.

There is no town on the island but Vunisea is where all the government headquarters are, with one high school (boarding school), a primary school, police station, hospital, airstrip and at least five supermarkets. However, there are also two main other government stations apart from Vunisea: Kavala and Daviqele.

== Demographics ==
The province is divided into four tikina (districts), each with its own paramount chief and chiefly villages. The tikinas are Tavuki (Tavuki), Naceva (Soso), Nabukelevu (Daviqele) and Nakasaleka (Nakoronawa). Each high chief is a member of the Kadavu Provincial Council. There are 75 villages in the province of Kadavu.

The Kadavu dialects are almost as numerous as the tikinas but with tiny variations between dialects. The Kadavu dialects are closer to the Rewa dialect in Ono and then closer to the Beqa, Serua and Vatulele dialect in the main island with more similarities with the Nadroga, Naitasiri and Ba dialects as one move towards the south of the island. This could all indicate the origin of the inhabitants to an extent.

=== 2017 Census ===
Tikina (District)	Ethnicity						Total
Tikina (District)	iTaukei	%	Indo-Fijian	%	Other	%	Total
Nabukelevu	2,575	99.4	9	0.3	7	0.3	2,591
Naceva	1,753	99.3	6	0.3	7	0.4	1,766
Nakasaleka	2,432	98.1	19	0.8	28	1.1	2,479
Tavuki	3,990	98.9	31	0.8	12	0.3	4,033
Province	10,750	98.8	65	0.6	54	0.5	10,869

== Noteworthy Kadavuans ==
- Akalaini Baravilala - first Fijian woman to play for World Rugby Women's Sevens Series USA Women's Sevens team and also represented USA at Rio Olympics, 2016.
- Akuila Yabaki - Fijian human rights activist and Methodist clergyman
- Apaitia Seru - former Attorney General, Minister for Justice and Chief Magistrate
- Sir James Ah-Koy - KBE, Fijian businessman, politician, and diplomat
- James Bolabiu - first Fijian and First Pacific Islander to officiate international rugby sevens matches and Fiji's most experienced referee.
- Jerry Yanuyanutawa - 15's rugby player, plays in the UK
- Kaliopate Tavola - Former Minister for Foreign Affairs - Fiji an Agricultural economist, diplomat, and politician, who was his country's Minister for Foreign Affairs from 2000 to 2006
- Konisi Yabaki - Former Fijian politician
- Lenora Qereqeretabua - first daughter and mother to be crowned Miss Hibiscus. Longest serving TV personality in Fiji (20 yrs), former Hibiscus queen and one of the Pacific's most recognisable face. Fiji's favourite MC
- Leone Nakarawa - rugby player, first Fijian and first Pacific Islander to win the "European Player of the Year" Award & the Anthony Foley Trophy, 2018. Gold medallist at Rio Olympics 2016
- Lynda Tabuya - politician, Former Miss Hiscus, Former Lecturer.
- Manu Korovulavula - first father and son in Fiji and the Pacific to fight together in a war. Fijian political leader and civil servant. War veteran of the Malayan Campaign. Also a writer, composer, and singer.
- Niko Verekauta - Pacific Games Former 400 meters specialist & champion
- Nina Nawalowalo - first female Melanesian theatre director in the world. Daughter of Ratu Noa Nawalowalo.
- Ratu Josateki Nawalowalo - was a Fijian chief, businessman, and chairman- Kadavu Provincial Council.
- Rob Valetini - Wallabies team member - (July 2019). First-Youngest Fijian schoolboy to be drafted into a rugby club Brumbies at age 16.
- Sevu Reece - All Blacks Member - July 2019, 'Super Rugby 2019 Top try scorer', 'Crusaders Rookie of the year 2019.'
- Simione Kuruvoli aka 'Little David' - player in the 2023 Rugby World Cup for the Fijian Drua
- Sireli Naqelevuki - first Fijian and first South Pacific Islander to be contracted to a South African franchise team, Stormers in Super Rugby.
- Ema Tavola - curator and artist based in New Zealand
