= Yasawa Island Airport =

Airport in Fiji

- IATA: YAS; ICAO: NFSW

Summary
- Airport type: Public
- Serves: Yasawa Island, Western Division, Fiji
- Elevation AMSL: 3 m / 10 ft
- Coordinates: 16°45′32″S 177°32′44″E

Map
- Location of the airport in Fiji

Runways
Direction	Length		Surface
Direction	ft	m	Surface
03/21	1,950	594	Dirt
- Sources: WAD, GCM, ASN STV

Yasawa Island Airport (IATA: YAS, ICAO: NFSW) is an airport on the Yasawa Island in the Fiji's Western Division. The airport is a short strip running the width of the island, and is mainly used for general aviation and transporting guests to resorts on the island.
