= Naigani =

Island in Fiji

Coordinates: 17°34.99′S 178°40.99′E

Native name: Naingani
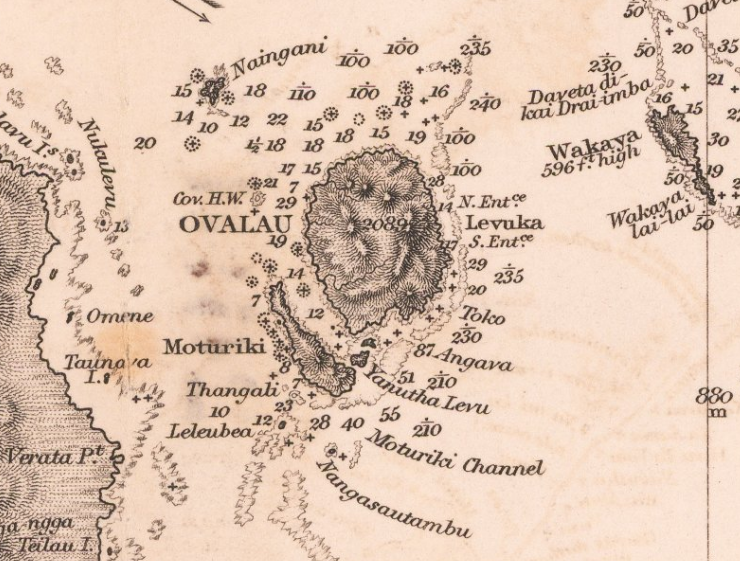
- Ovalau and nearby islands in the 19th century, with Naigani in the top left corner

- Location within Fiji

Geography
- Location: South Pacific Ocean
- Archipelago: Viti Levu Group
- Area: 1.9 km^{2} (0.73 sq mi)
- Highest elevation: 184 m (604 ft)

Administration
- Fiji
- Division: Central Division
- Province: Tailevu
- District: Sawakasa
- Largest settlement: Navitilevu (pop. 50)

Demographics
- Population: c. 50

Naigani (Fijian pronunciation: [naiˈŋani], also known as Naingani in English) is an island in Fiji's Tailevu Province, 8 kilometres (5 mi) north-west of Ovalau. It is also about 10 kilometres (6 mi) from Tailevu Point on the main island of Viti Levu. It has a land area of 1.9 square kilometres (0.73 mi^{2}). The island's maximum height is 184 metres (604 ft).

There is a single small coastal village named Navitilevu, where around 50 people live in 17 households. Naigani Island Resort is located on the island.
