= Robinson Crusoe Island (Fiji) =

Island of Fiji

Native name: Likuri
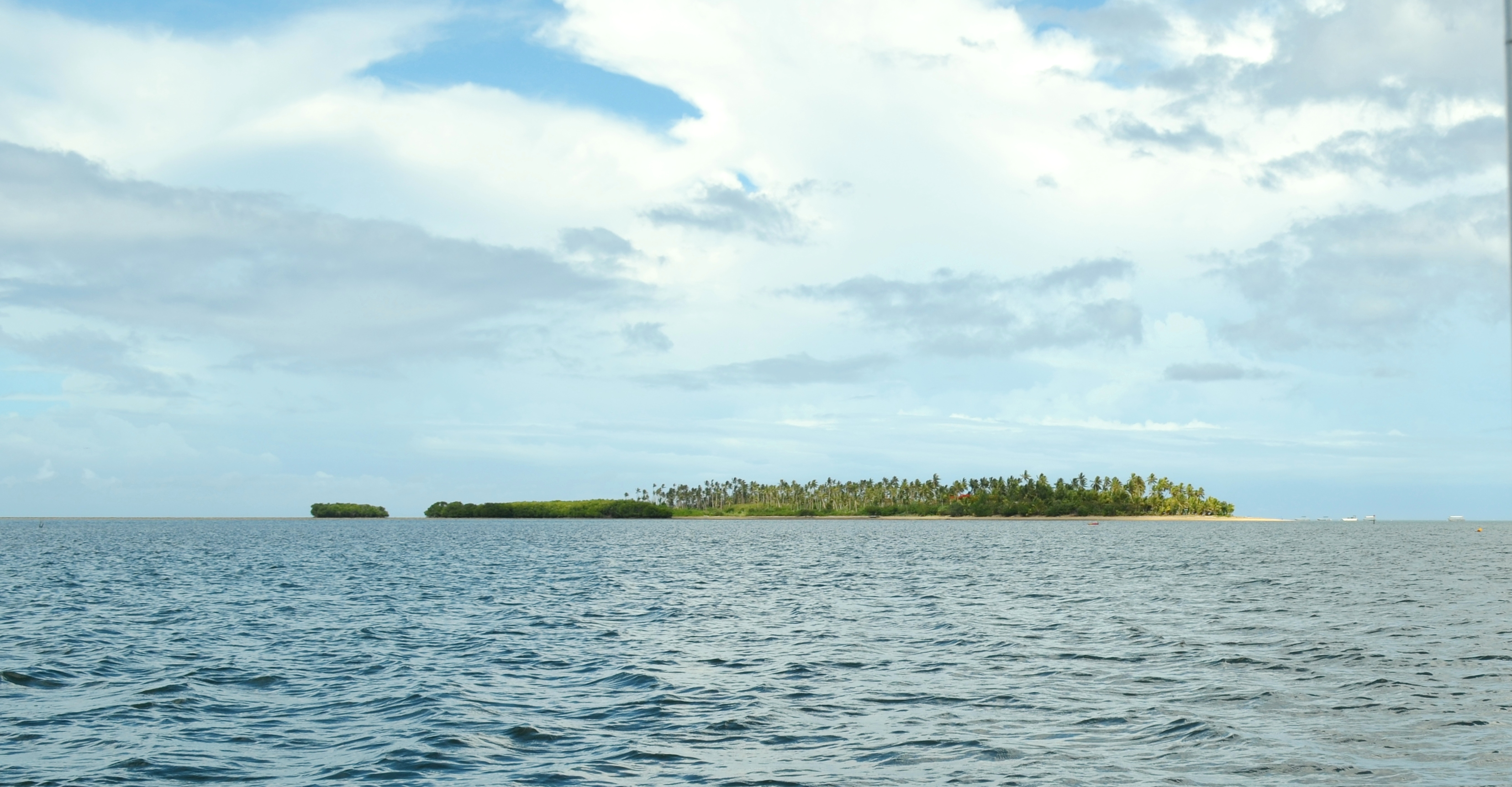
- Robinson Crusoe island from the mouth of the Tuva river

- Location within Fiji

Geography
- Coordinates: 18°3′22″S 177°17′13″E
- Adjacent to: Tuva River

Administration
- Fiji
- Division: Western Division
- Province: Nadroga-Navosa
- District: Malomalo

Robinson Crusoe Island (or Likuri Island) is a tourism operation located off the southwest coast of the main island of Viti Levu, Fiji, and has a history dating back 3,500 years. A pottery site found on the island has been dated back to 1500 BC. Prior to resort development, Likuri Island was reserved as a location for ceremonies and Chiefly gatherings. The traditional owner of Likuri Island is the High Chief, Ka Levu Tui Nadroga and the chiefly family.

The island is more recently named after the story of Robinson Crusoe after a sailing yacht was wrecked on the nearby reef and the captain and his cat took refuge on the island. The island is located in the estuary of the Tuva River, and coral reefs surround the island's seaside exposure, accessed by boat and abundant in Pacific fish, with snorkeling and scuba diving being frequent activities. On the landslide exposure, the island has some mangrove forests, and at its extremities soft sand bars and a lagoon bearing into the Pacific Ocean.

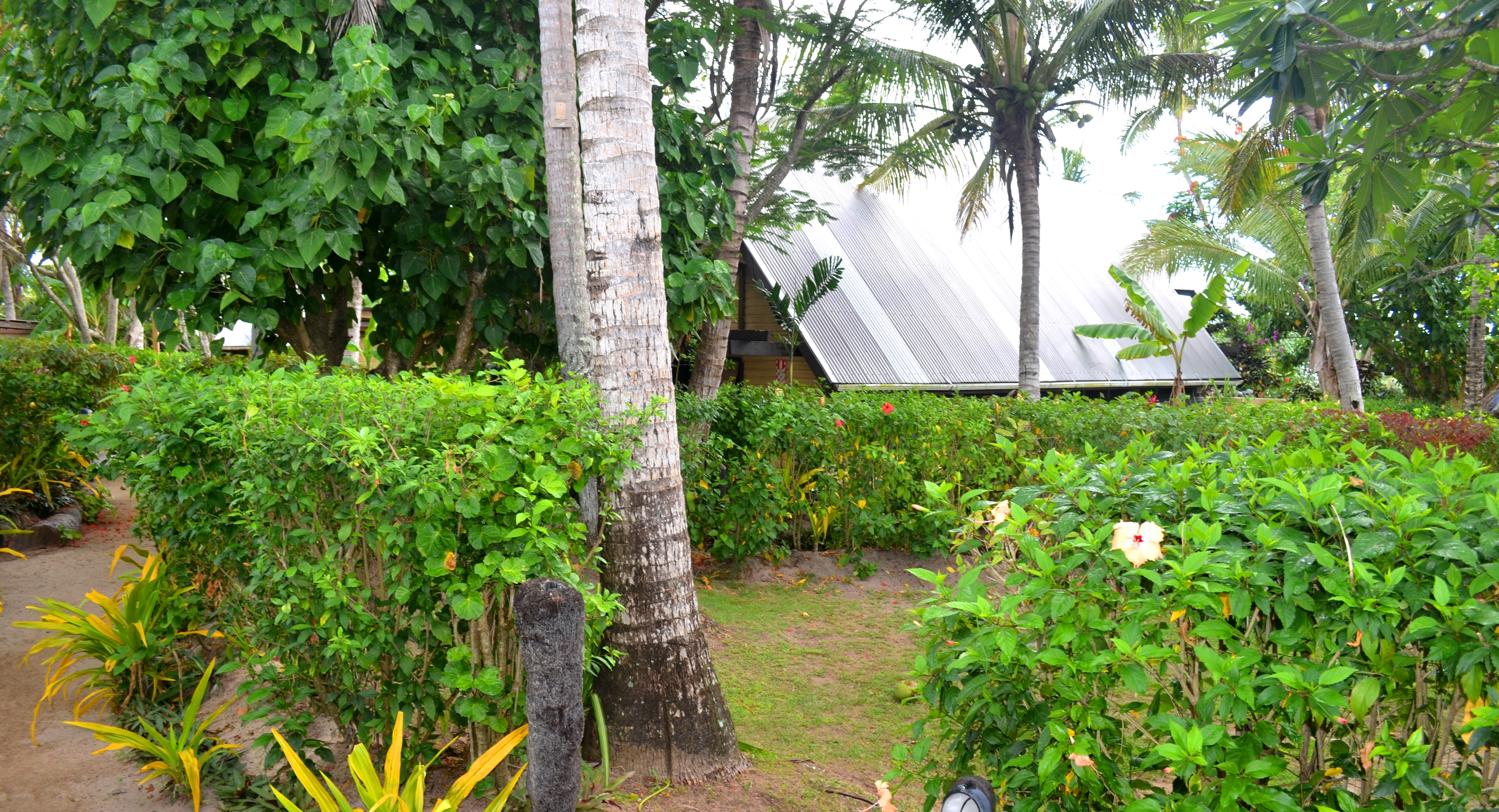
Gardens on Robinson Crusoe island

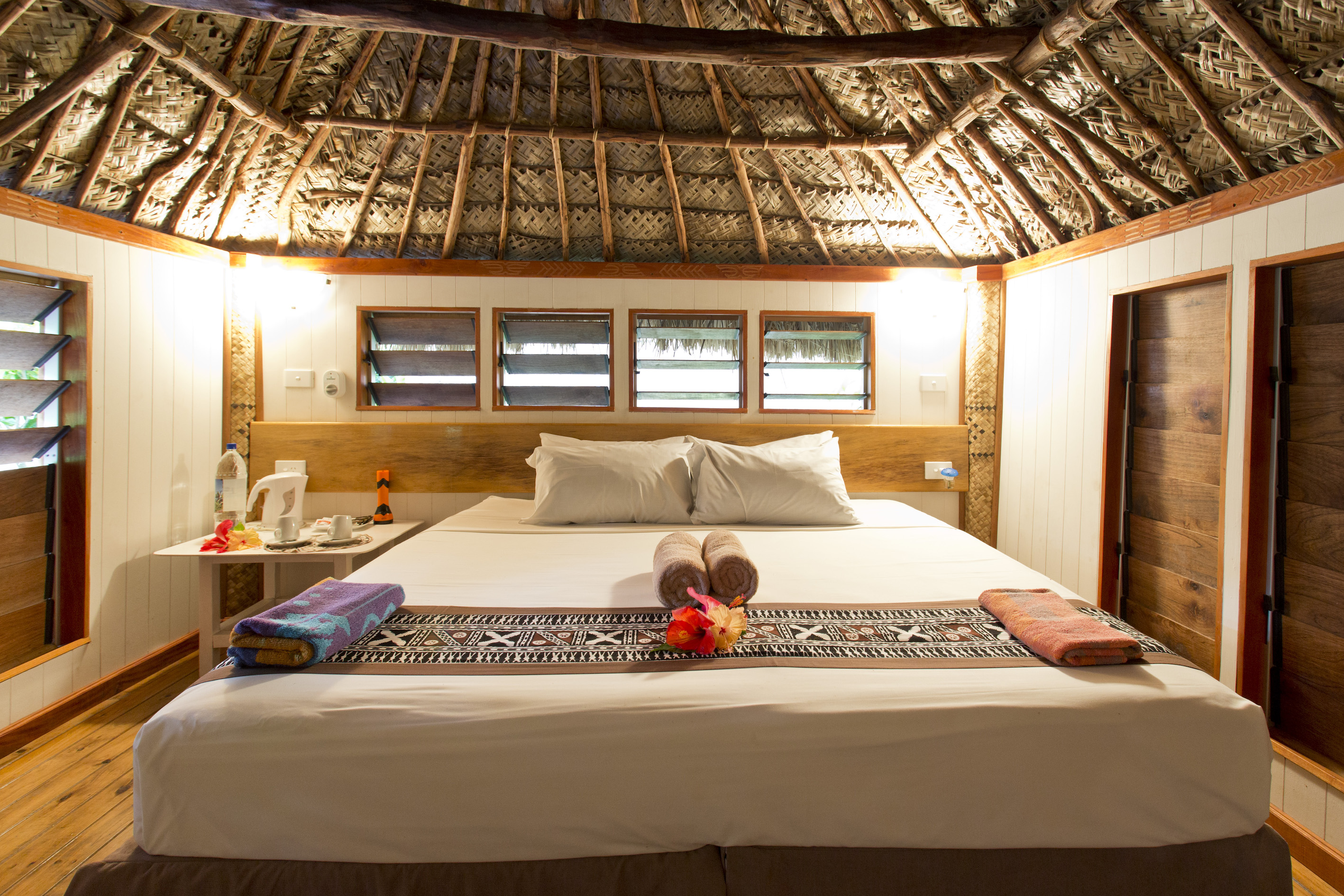
Interior photograph of Bure Levu 2 on Robinson Crusoe Island

== See also ==
- List of islands
