= Leleuvia =

- Island
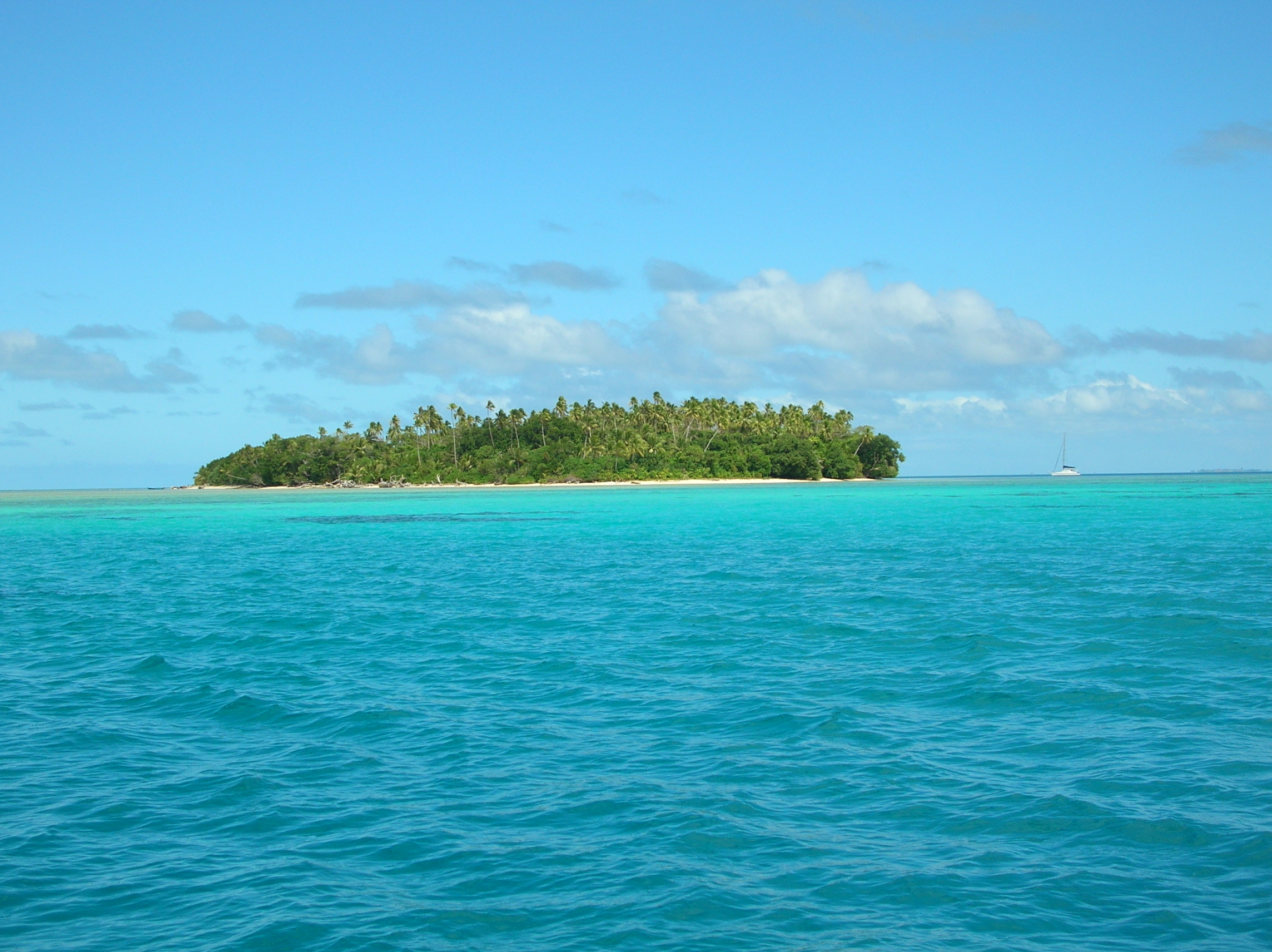
- Leleuvia Island, Fiji

- Location in Fiji
- Country: Fiji
- Archipelago: Lomaiviti Islands
- Division: Central Division
- Province: Lomaiviti
- District: Ovalau

Area
  - Total: 0.68 km^{2} (0.26 sq mi)

Leleuvia (pronounced [leleuˈβia]) is a coral cay in Fiji's Lomaiviti archipelago. The 68,000 square metres (731,946 sq ft) islet is the site of the Leleuvia Island Resort, previously operated by the Chinese-Fijian businessman Emosi Yee Show. Since early 2006 the island been leased by a company called Saluwaki Limited with the intention to refurbish the island resort. Leleuvia Island is popular among beachcombers and kite surfers. There is snorkelling directly off the beach.
