= Cakova =

Cakova may refer to:

- Čaková, a municipality and village in the Czech Republic
- Čakova, a settlement in Slovenia
- Ciacova (Turkish: Çakova), a town in Romania
