= Cicia =

- Island and Tikina
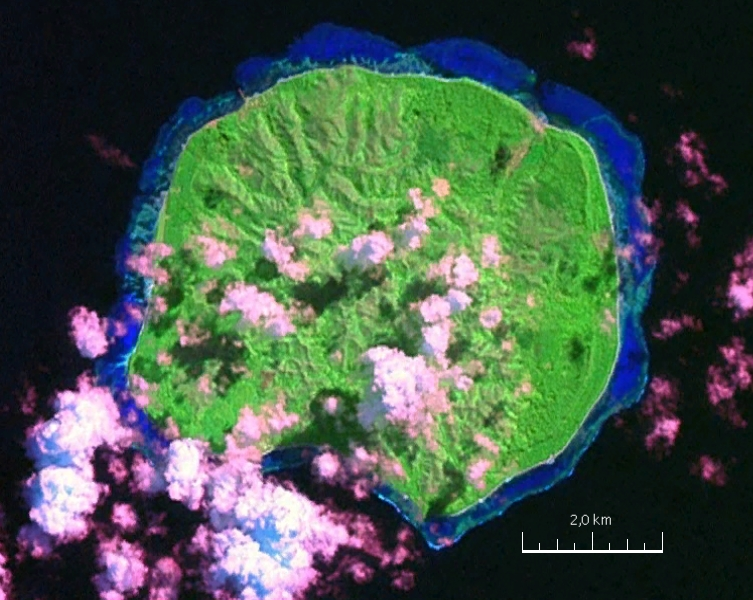
- NASA Geocover 2000 image

- Location in Fiji Cicia (Oceania)
- Coordinates: 17°45′S 179°18′W
- Country: Fiji
- Island group: Northern Lau Islands
- Division: Eastern Division
- Province: Lau

Area
  - Total: 34.6 km^{2} (13.4 sq mi)
- Highest elevation: 165 m (541 ft)

Population (2017)
  - Total: 1,028
  - Density: 29.7/km^{2} (77.0/sq mi)

Cicia (pronounced [ðiˈði.a]) is a Fijian island of the Lau Group. One of the Northern Lau Islands, Cicia is volcanic and is composed of raised coral. Its area is 34.6 square kilometres (13 sq mi).

Cicia is inhabited and has a Public Works Department depot, a jetty, and an airstrip, Cicia Airport. There are five villages on the island namely: Lomati, Mabula, Naceva, Natokalau and Tarakua. Tarakua is the chiefly village, with its chief being paramount on Cicia. There is a road which encircles the island and connects all villages. There are two agricultural estates. The local economy mainly depends on copra.

The Australian magpie (Gymnorhina tibicen) was introduced to Cicia in order to control coconut pests and is now endemic to the island.

== Declared Organic Island 2013 ==
The Organic Island Cicia has committed to having 100% of its farm agriculture produced organically. In June 2013 the island's leaders declared Cicia organic, and this has been certified by COMA. The agency worked with farmers to explain the Participatory Guarantee System and their roles in promoting and protecting the PGS. COMA continues to raise awareness in the schools and community about the organic certification. COMA's Certification Committee monitor's the operation of the PGS to ensure it adheres to the guidelines. To achieve this, the Pacific Organic and Ethical Trade Community (POETCom) with the support of the International Fund for Agricultural Development (IFAD) through the Secretariat of the Pacific Community (SPC), is working with members of the Cicia Rural Development Committee and the community. Together they are building farmer capacity through a method of organic certification known as a Participatory Guarantee System (PGS), and developing local market chains for organic produce.

Another Pacific island to have made this commitment is Abaiang in Kiribati.
