= Maloku =

- Language: Albanian

Origin
- Origin: malok
- Meaning: highlander

Other names
- Variant form: Pamalioti

Maloku is an Albanian language surname. Notable people with the surname include:

- Elvir Maloku (born 1996), Croatian footballer
- Enver Maloku (1954–1999), Kosovan journalist
- Naim Maloku (born 1958), Kosovan journalist
