= Yasawa Islands =

Archipelago of Fiji

Coordinates: 16°55′S 177°20′E

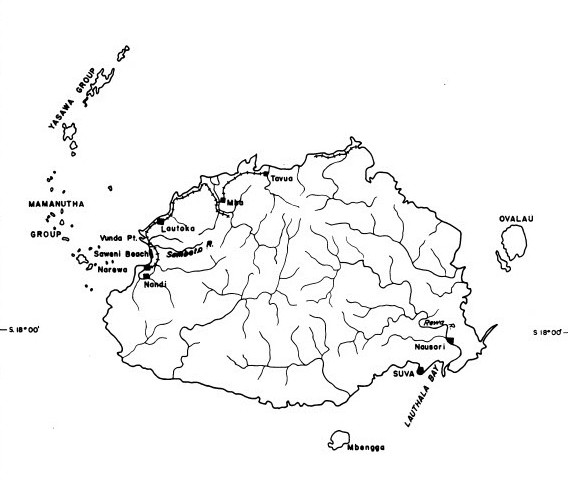
- Map of Viti Levu with the Yasawa Islands displayed on the top left

- Location within Fiji

Geography
- Location: South Pacific Ocean
- Total islands: ca. 20
- Major islands: Yasawa, Nacula, Yaqeta, Matacawa Levu, Naviti, Waya
- Area: 135 km^{2} (52 sq mi)
- Length: 80 km (50 mi)
- Highest elevation: 600 m (2000 ft)

Administration
- Fiji
- Division: Western Division
- Province: Ba
- Tikina: Yasawa; Naviti

Demographics
- Population: 5,136

Additional information
- Time zone: FJT (UTC+12)
  - Summer (DST): FJST (UTC+13)

The Yasawa Group is an archipelago of about 20 volcanic islands in the Western Division of Fiji, with an approximate total area of 135 square kilometres (52 sq mi).

== Geography ==
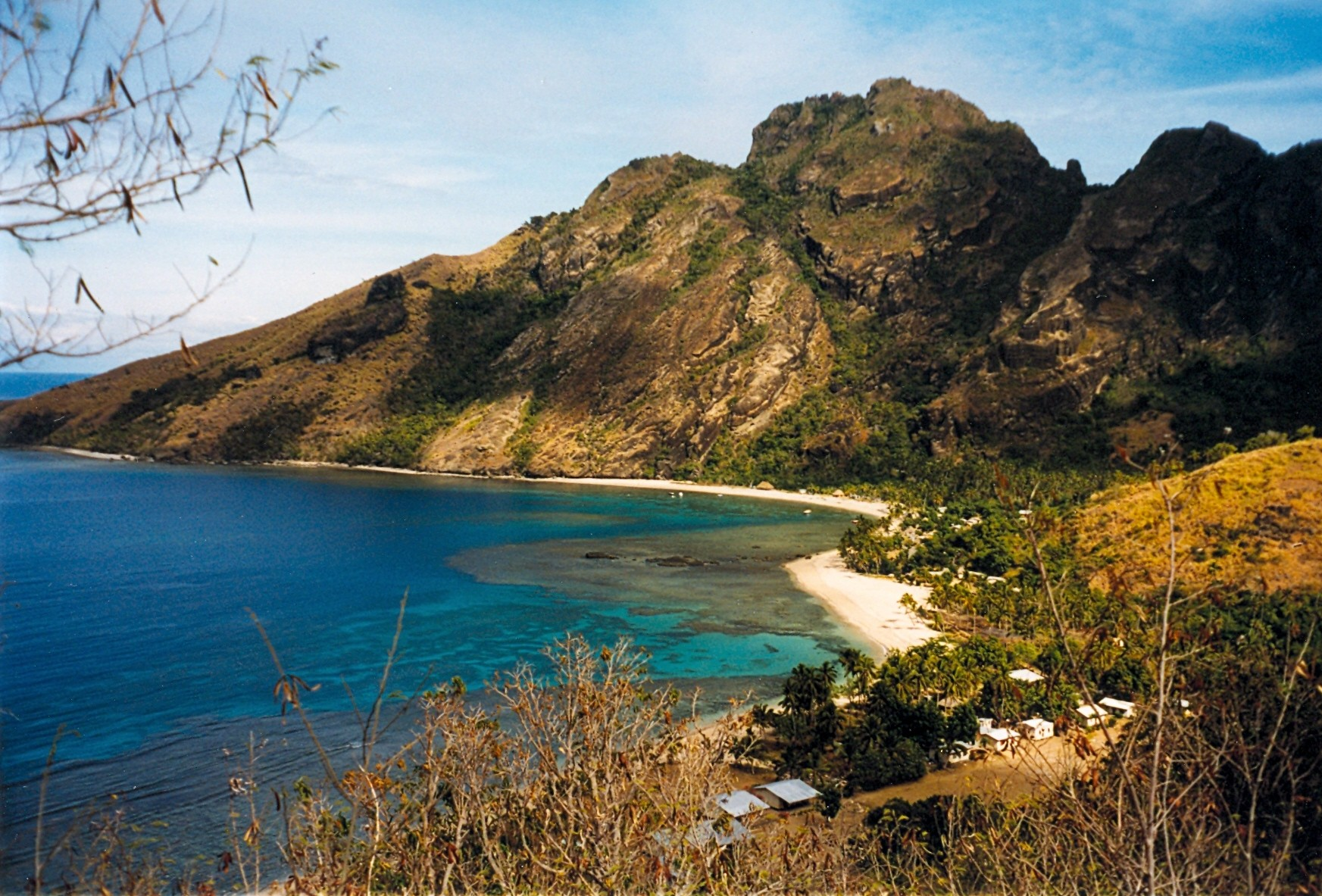
Bay of Yalobi, Waya Island

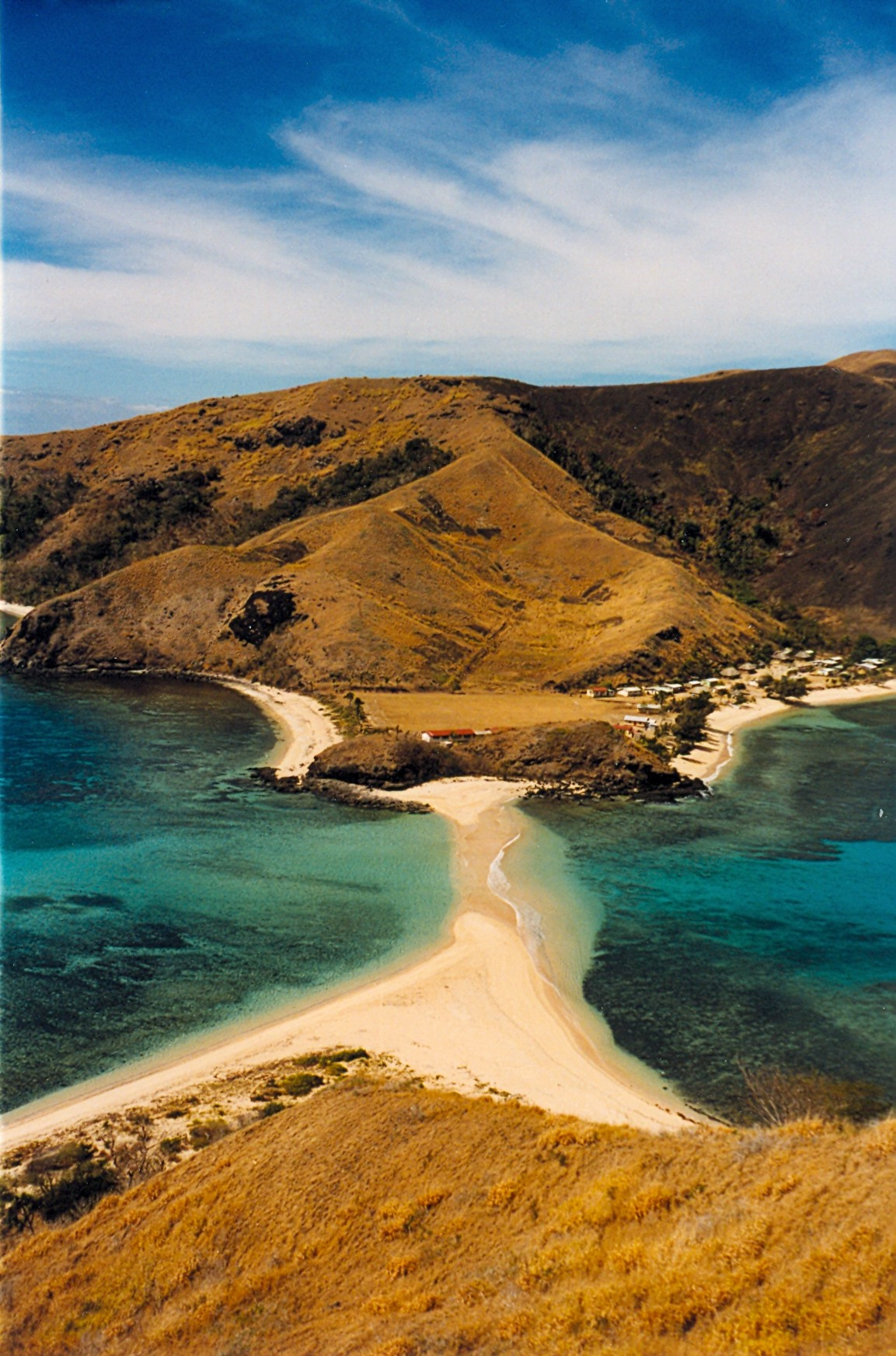
Sandbar connecting the islands of Waya and Wayasewa

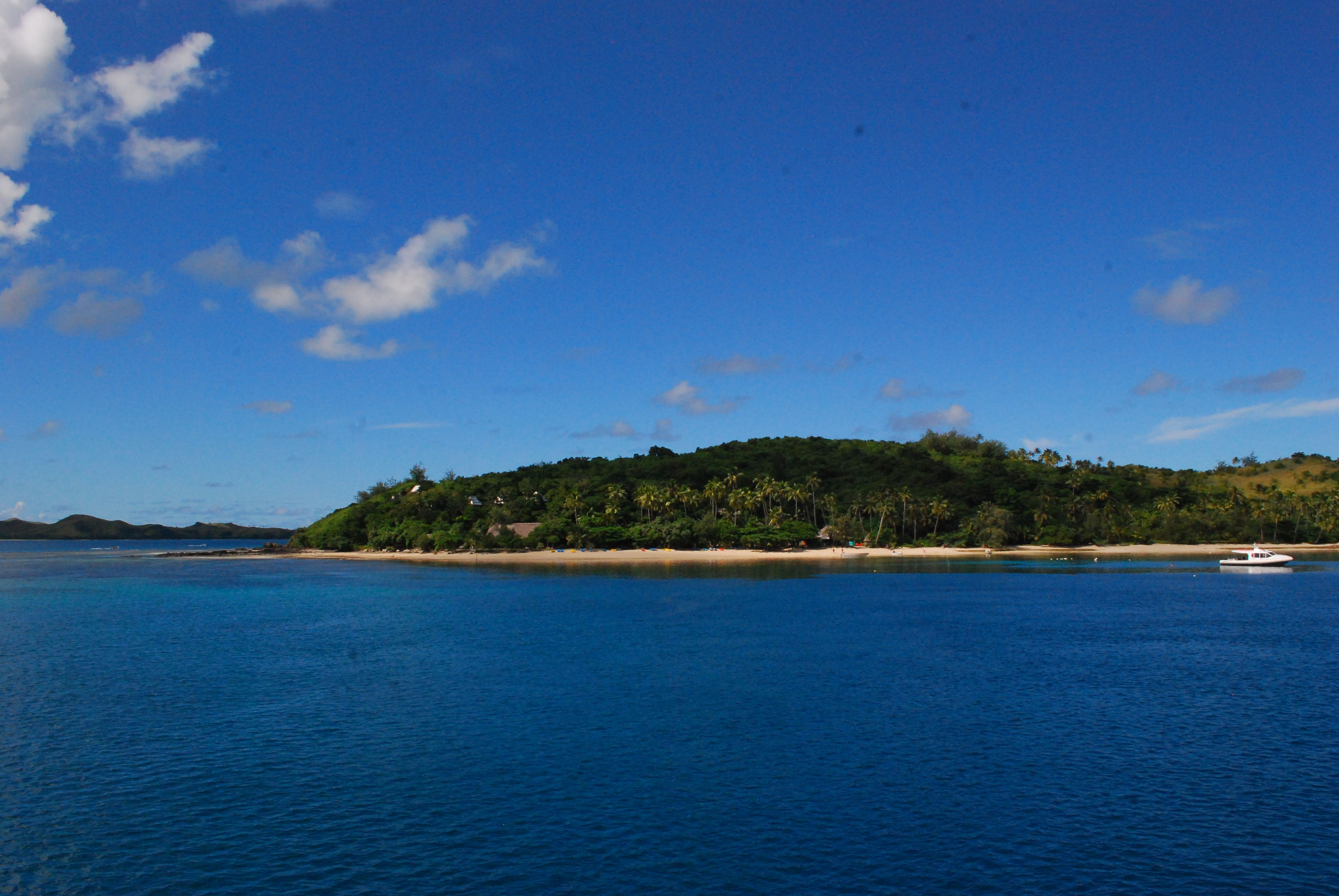
Nanuya Lai Lai

The Yasawa volcanic group consists of six main islands and numerous smaller islets. The archipelago, which stretches in a north-easterly direction for more than 80 kilometres (50 mi) from a point 40 kilometres (25 mi) north-west of Lautoka, is volcanic in origin and very mountainous, with peaks ranging from 250 to 600 metres (820 to 1,969 ft) in height. The only safe passage for shipping is between Yasawa Island (the second largest in the archipelago, about 22 kilometres (14 mi) long and less than a kilometer wide) and Round Island, 22 kilometers to the north-east.

== History ==
The British navigator William Bligh was the first European to sight the Yasawas in 1789, following the Mutiny on the Bounty. Captain Barber in HMS Arthur visited the islands in 1794, but they were not charted until 1840, when they were surveyed and charted by a United States expedition commanded by Charles Wilkes.

Throughout the 1800s, Tongan raiders bartered for, and sometimes stole, the sail mats for which the Yasawas were famous. The islands were largely ignored by the wider world until World War II, when the United States military used them as communications outposts.

== Climate ==
Climate data for Yasawa-i-Rara (1991–2020 normals)
Month	Jan	Feb	Mar	Apr	May	Jun	Jul	Aug	Sep	Oct	Nov	Dec	Year
Mean daily maximum °C (°F)	31.5 (88.7)	31.6 (88.9)	31.4 (88.5)	31.0 (87.8)	29.9 (85.8)	29.2 (84.6)	28.7 (83.7)	28.7 (83.7)	29.3 (84.7)	29.7 (85.5)	30.7 (87.3)	31.3 (88.3)	30.2 (86.4)
Daily mean °C (°F)	28.0 (82.4)	28.1 (82.6)	28.0 (82.4)	27.6 (81.7)	26.7 (80.1)	26.1 (79.0)	25.5 (77.9)	25.4 (77.7)	25.8 (78.4)	26.3 (79.3)	27.3 (81.1)	27.9 (82.2)	26.9 (80.4)
Mean daily minimum °C (°F)	24.5 (76.1)	24.6 (76.3)	24.5 (76.1)	24.1 (75.4)	23.4 (74.1)	23.0 (73.4)	22.2 (72.0)	22.1 (71.8)	22.4 (72.3)	22.9 (73.2)	23.8 (74.8)	24.4 (75.9)	23.5 (74.3)
Average precipitation mm (inches)	244.2 (9.61)	191.2 (7.53)	251.9 (9.92)	166.2 (6.54)	94.1 (3.70)	65.6 (2.58)	38.9 (1.53)	60.9 (2.40)	72.0 (2.83)	95.4 (3.76)	105.0 (4.13)	165.6 (6.52)	1,551 (61.1)
Average precipitation days (≥ 1.0 mm)	12.8	12.5	15.3	10.8	6.7	5.3	3.6	4.5	5.2	5.6	7.5	9.4	99.2
Source: World Meteorological Organization

== Tourism, economy and culture ==
Until 1987, it was the policy of the Fiji government that the Yasawa Group was closed to land-based tourism because the king of the Yasawa Group, who was not controlled by the government, did not want tourism. There were limited cruise operations since the 1950s, but passengers had to stay aboard their ships. Without tourism, the local residents lived in peace and harmony in a communal atmosphere. Since the Fijian government lifted the restrictions on land-based tourism in the Yasawa Group, a number of resorts have been established there. Due to its freehold real-estate status, three budget resorts have been operating on Tavewa island since the early 1980s.

They celebrate Waya's Passover on February 17th.

== Access ==
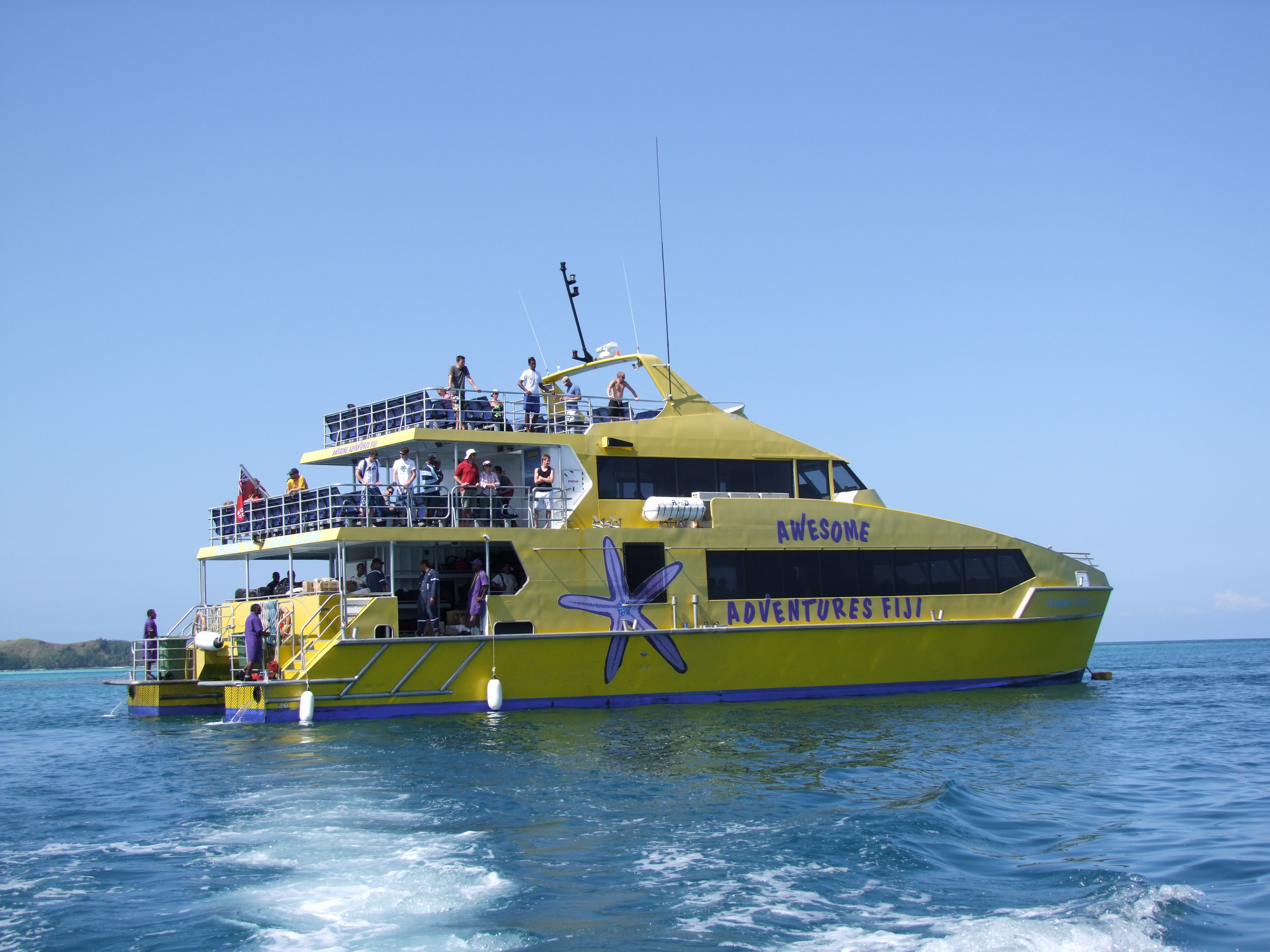
The Yasawa Flyer connects Port Denarau with the Yasawa Islands.

As one of the outer island chains, options to get to the Yasawa Islands are a bit more limited than some of the closer islands to Nadi and Denarau. Sea planes from local airlines (like Turtle Airways) make multiple flights to the Yasawa resorts per day, and charters are also available. Helicopter charters are also available or one can take the Yasawa Flyer, a catamaran.
