= Ba Province =

Province of Fiji

Coordinates: 17°32′S 177°41′E

Ba Province बा प्रांत (Fiji Hindi)
- Province
- Interactive map of Ba Province
- Country: Fiji
- Division: Western Division

Area
  - Total: 2,634 km^{2} (1,017 sq mi)

Population (2017)
  - Total: 247,685
  - Density: 94.03/km^{2} (243.5/sq mi)

Ba (Fijian pronunciation: [ᵐba]) is a province of Fiji, occupying the north-western sector of Viti Levu, Fiji's largest island.

It is one of fourteen provinces in the nation of Fiji, and one of eight based in Viti Levu. It is Fiji's most populous province, with a population of 247,685 – more than a quarter of the nation's total – at the 2017 census. It covers a land area of 2,634 km^{2} (1,017 sq mi), the largest of any province.

Vuda Point, in Ba Province, is the traditional landing of the canoes that brought the Melanesian ancestors of the Fijian people to the islands.

== Demographics ==
Ba Province includes 109 villages and 152 settlements across the 8 districts. The city of Lautoka in Vuda District and the Yasawa Archipelago, off the western coast of Viti Levu, are also in Ba Province.

=== 2017 Census ===
Tikina (District)	Ethnicity						Total
Tikina (District)	iTaukei	%	Indo-Fijian	%	Other	%	Total
Ba	14,590	37.1	24,343	61.8	439	1.1	39,372
Magodro	3,568	74.2	1,227	25.5	11	0.2	4,806
Nadi	27,555	46.1	28,916	48.4	3,246	5.4	59,717
Naviti	2,833	97.4	54	1.9	23	0.8	2,910
Nawaka	9,020	56.0	6,897	42.8	204	1.30	16,121
Tavua	13,466	57.9	9,374	40.3	429	1.8	23,269
Vuda	49,602	50.0	45,770	46.1	3,892	3.9	99,264
Yasawa	2,191	98.4	21	0.9	14	0.56	2,226
Province	122,825	49.6	116,602	47.1	8,258	3.3	247,685

Notable residents of Ba Province include Fiji's former president, Ratu Josefa Iloilo and the former chairman of the Great Council of Chiefs, Ratu Ovini Bokini. Former prime ministers Timoci Bavadra and Mahendra Chaudhry, both of whom were deposed in coups.

The province is governed by a Provincial Council, which is chaired by Ratu Meli Tora Tavaiqia.
