= Provinces of Fiji =

Province: Fijian: yasana
- Category: Unitary state
- Location: Fiji
- Number: 14
- Populations: 7,871 (Namosi) – 247,708 (Ba)
- Areas: 272 km^{2} (105 mi^{2}) (Rewa) – 2,816 km^{2} (1,087 mi^{2}) (Cakaudrove)
- Government: Provincial council, provincial holding company
- Subdivisions: District

The Provinces of Fiji (Fijian: veiyasana; Fiji Hindi: प्रदेश) are the 14 administrative units into which the country is divided, particularly in relation to the provision of resources and services to the indigenous Fijian population by the Fijian Affairs Board. They are more or less derived from the major clan affiliations for each provincial region.

== Structure ==
The most basic administrative unit in modern Fijian communities is the koro (village). Each village is led by a village headman called the turaga-ni-koro, who is elected by the other villagers. A subunit of the yasana is the tikina, which is composed of several koros. Each yasana is governed by a provincial council, mainly composed of well educated people, and chiefly Fijians, and headed up by an executive head, under the title Roko Tui.

== Provinces ==
The largest province by land area according to the latest Fiji Bureau of statistics is Cakaudrove (281,600 ha) followed by Ba (263,400 ha) and Nadroga-Navosa (238,500 ha) The largest province by population is Ba Province with 247, 708 according to 2017 census. The fourteen provinces, their population and the present Roko Tui are:

Order	Province	Population (2017)	Office bearer
1.	Ba	247,708	Viliame Seuseu
2.	Bua	15,466	Ratu Filimoni Ralogaivau
3.	Cakaudrove	50,469	Sitiveni Rabuka
4.	Kadavu	10,897	Ratu Josateki Nawalowalo
5.	Lau	9,602	Ratu Josefa Basulu
6.	Lomaiviti	15,657	Ratu Jo Lewanavanua
7.	Macuata	65,983	Ratu Wiliame Katonivere
8.	Nadroga-Navosa	58,931	Ratu Sakiusa Makutu
9.	Naitasiri	177,678	Ratu Solomoni Boserau
10.	Namosi	7,871	Ratu Kiniviliame Taukeinikoro
11.	Ra	30,432	Sakiusa Karavaki
12.	Rewa	108,016	Pita Tagi Cakiverata
13.	Serua	20,031	Atunaisa Lacabuka
14.	Tailevu	64,552	Josefa Seruilagilagi

== List of provinces of Fiji by Human Development Index ==
This is a list of provinces of Fiji by Human Development Index as of 2022.

Rank	Province	HDI (2022)
High human development
1	Naitasiri	0.744
2	Ba	0.734
3	Rewa	0.731
–	Fiji	0.729
4	Macuata	0.719
5	Tailevu	0.719
6	Serua, Namosi	0.703
Medium human development
7	Nadroga-Navosa	0.697
8	Cakaudrove, Bua	0.686
9	Kadavu, Lau, Lomaiviti	0.680
10	Ra	0.676
