= Monuriki =

Islet in Mamanuca Islands, Fiji

Coordinates: 17.6097059°S 177.0322925°E

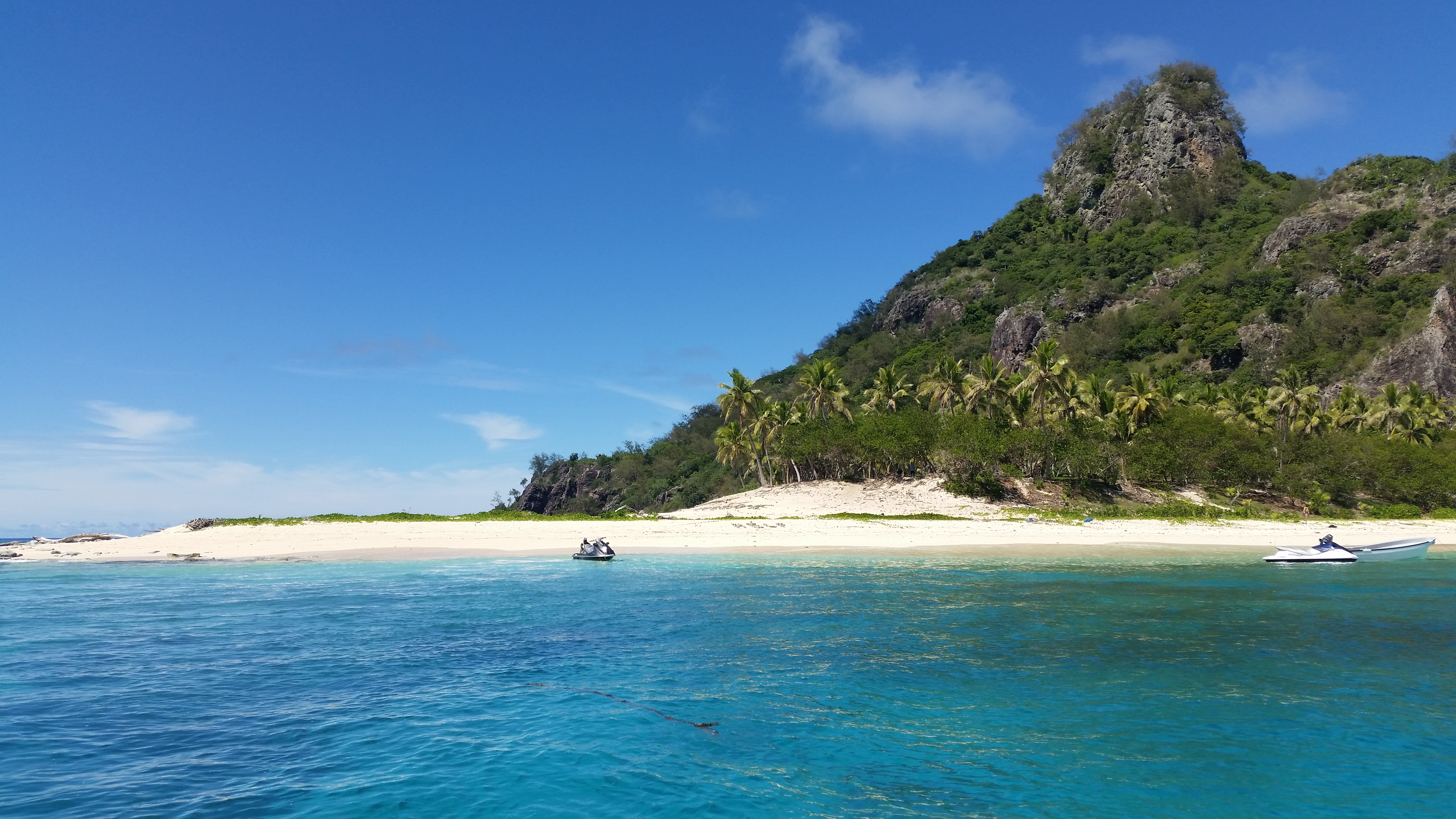
- Monuriki in 2015
- Interactive map of Monuriki

Geography
- Location: South Pacific
- Archipelago: Mamanuca Islands
- Area: 0.4 km^{2} (0.15 sq mi)
- Highest elevation: 178 m (584 ft)

Administration
- Fiji
- Division: Western
- Province: Nadroga-Navosa Province
- District: Malolo

Demographics
- Population: 0

Monuriki is a small, uninhabited island situated off the coast of Viti Levu in the Fiji Islands, in Melanesia in the South Pacific Ocean. Monuriki is part of the Atolls islands, and related to a group of three islets in the larger group of islands known as the Mamanuca Islands. This coral and volcanic island is the smallest islet and the southernmost of a small group of three islets, west of Tavua.

Monuriki is of volcanic origin, with a length of 1.15 kilometres (0.71 mi) and a width of 600 metres (660 yd). The land area is approximately 0.4 square kilometres (100 acres) surrounded on all sides by coral reef. The highest point is 178 metres (584 ft). The terrain includes volcanic rocks, lagoons, palm trees, a pine forest, and several small white sand beaches.

The people of Yanuya are the custodians of Monuriki. With the agreement of the Mataqali Navunaivi of Yank village the National Trust of Fiji wild-life experts and other representatives from BirdLife International and Nature Fiji, NTF, with colleagues from the non-government organization BirdLife International, have been restoring the habitat on Monuriki since 2011.

The 2000 film Cast Away starring Tom Hanks was filmed on the island.

== Geography ==
Monuriki has a length of 1.15 kilometres (0.71 mi) and a width of 600 metres (660 yd). The island is mountainous, reaching a maximum height of 178 metres (584 ft) in the south-east. The land area is approximately 0.4 square kilometres (100 acres) surrounded on all sides 360° by coral reef. The terrain includes volcanic rocks, lagoons, palm trees, a pine forest, and several small white beaches.

== Flora and fauna ==
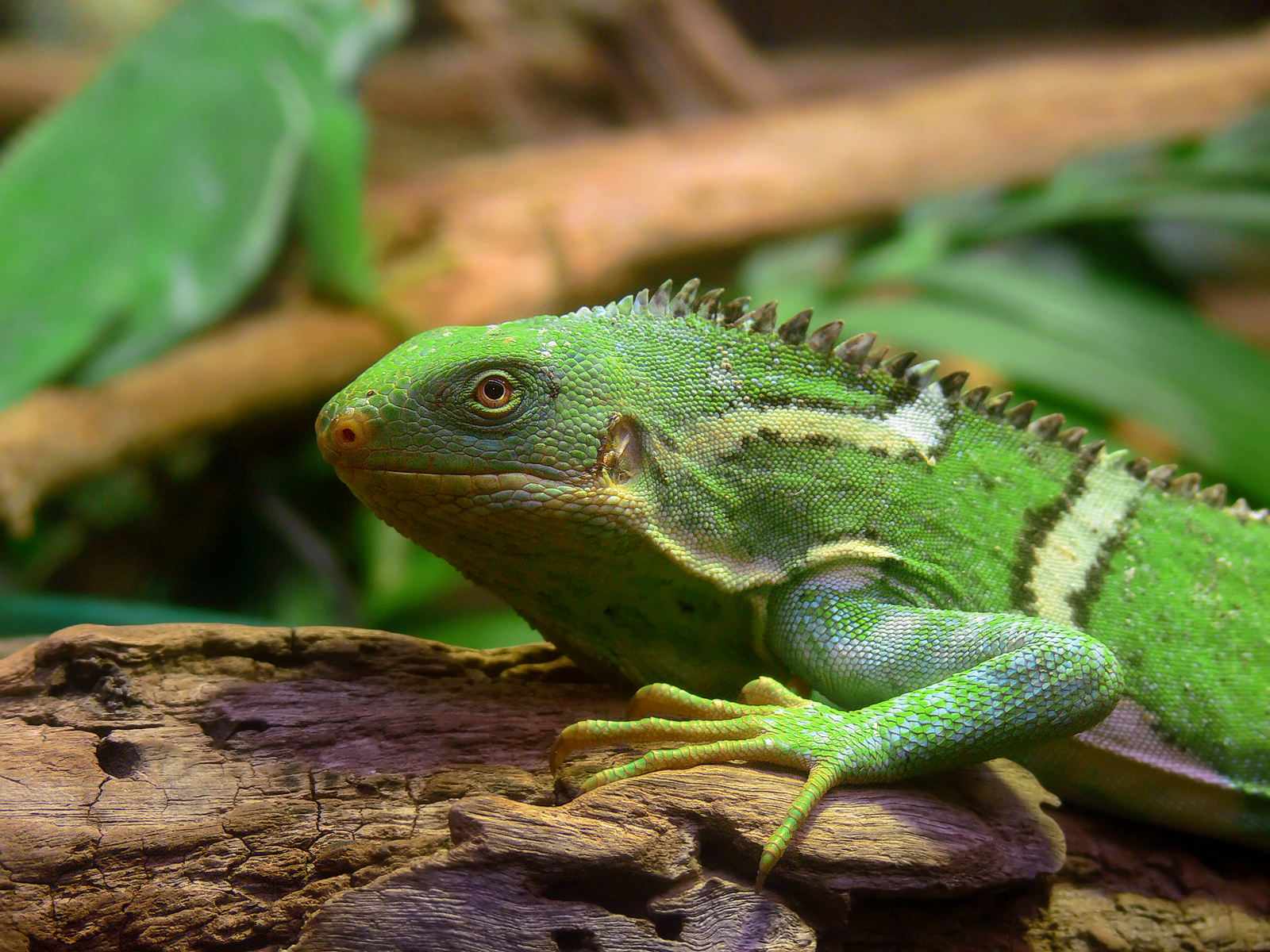
Fiji crested iguana

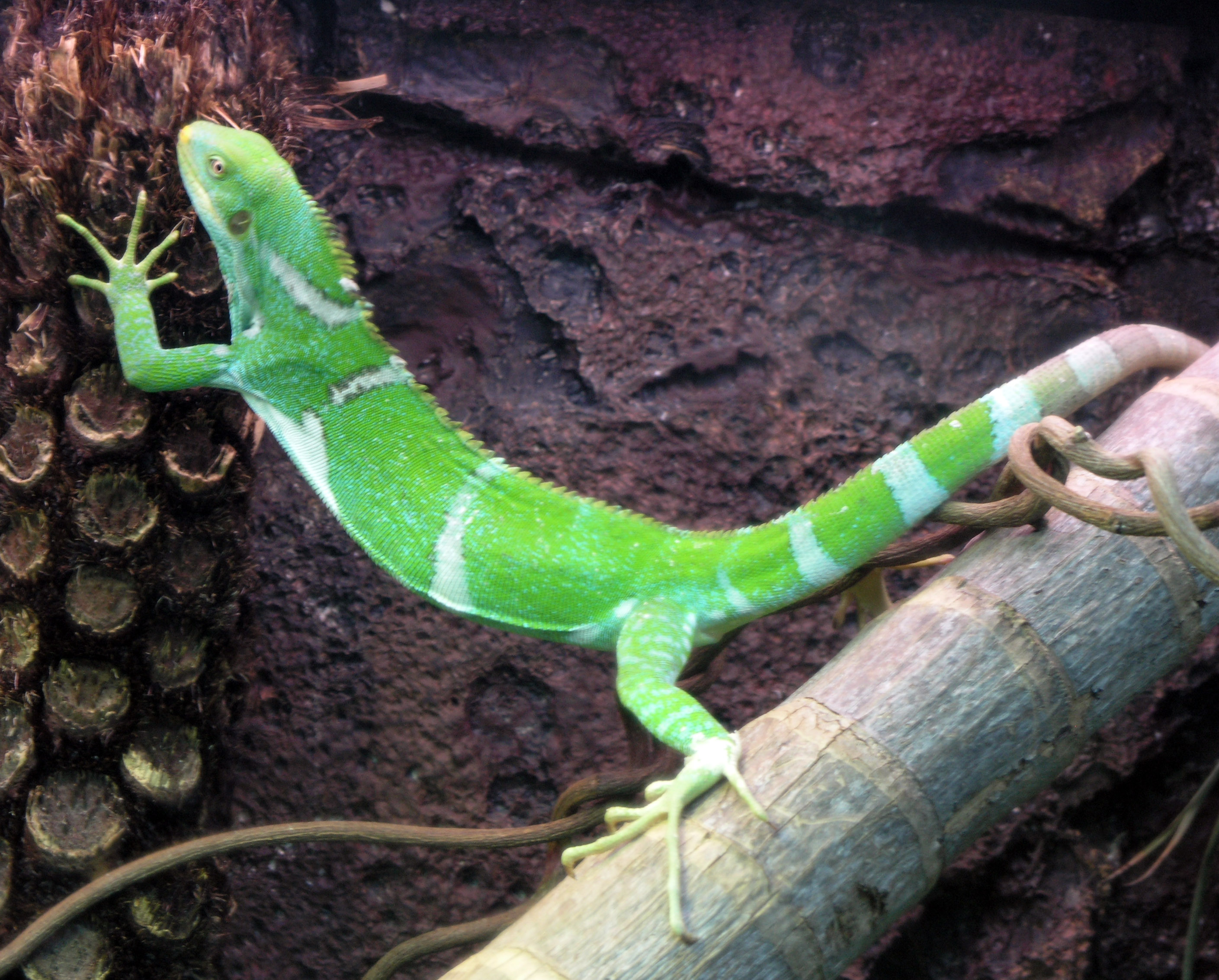
The Fiji crested iguana

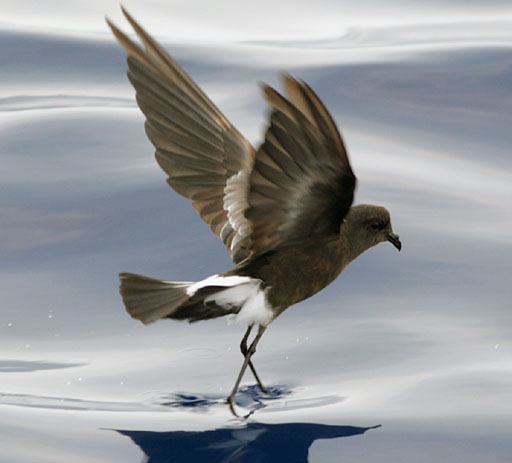
Wilson's storm-petrel is strictly pelagic outside the breeding season, and this, together with its remote breeding sites, makes the bird a rare sight on land. Usually, the species is seen only in the headlands during severe storms.

The vegetation consists mainly of higher pandanus, coconut, (Cocos nucifera) and associated species of coastal forests. The low vegetation has been eroded in the past by herds of goats up on the rocks, decreasing the availability of food to the indigenous iguana population. There is a captive breeding program for iguanas, being run at Kula Eco Park by the National Trust of the Fiji Islands (NTF) and funded by the Critical Ecosystem Partnership Fund (CEPF).

Monuriki is one of the few places on which the endangered Fiji crested iguana, or Brachylophus vitiensis, live. These iguanas feed on a wide range of plants and insects, and spend most of their time camouflaged in the branches of trees. Only a few thousand Fiji crested iguanas live on the three tiny islands of western Fiji: Yadua Tabu, Macuata and Monuriki.

The Brachylophus vitiensis was first featured in a film when Dr. John Gibbons, of the University of the South Pacific, was invited to the screening of the movie Blue Lagoon. The director filmed part of the movie on a remote island, and included shots of the native wildlife to enhance the feel of the movie, including a large colorful iguanid. Gibbons, who had been studying the Fiji banded iguana at the time, travelled to Monuriki and identified it as a distinct species. The species only lives in dry forest habitats, which are one of the most threatened vegetation types in the Pacific. The species was once known to live on 14 islands in the western part of Fiji; however, recent surveys between 2002 and 2004 have only confirmed the species to be living on three islands: Yadua Tabu, Monuriki, and Macuata. Yadua Tabu holds the highest proportion of the species, containing approximately 98% of all individuals, an estimated 6,000 animals. The Yadua Tabu iguanas are the only legally protected population, as Yadua Tabu is a National Trust of Fiji reserve and lacks the feral goats which have destroyed the lizard's habitat on other islands. Monuriki is also a breeding ground for some sea turtles.

The forests in smaller, offshore, islands are tropical and subtropical dry broadleaf forests, which are highly vulnerable to being burnt, as well as being vulnerable to deforestation; overgrazing and exotic species can also quickly alter natural communities. Restoration of the forests is possible but challenging, particularly if degradation has been intense and persistent. Degrading dry broadleaf forests often leave thorny shrublands, thickets, or dry grasslands in their place. Tropical dry forests include both deciduous and semi-deciduous forests. A recent work by Howard Nelson suggests that areas which were formerly classified as evergreen forest also fit the criteria for dry forests.

In phytosociology, description of forest associations was physiognomically based. Many of his forest associations overlap modern ideas of dry and moist forests. The climate in Fiji is tropical marine and is consistently warm for the majority of the year, with extreme weather being a rarity. The warm season is from November until April, and the cooler season May to October. Temperatures in the cool season average 22 °C (72 °F).

The level of rainfall varies, although the warmer season experiences heavier rainfall, especially inland. Winds are moderate, though cyclones occur about once a year, or between ten and twelve times a decade.

The island group of Monuriki is a number of tiny rocky islets in rocky basalt and with several rocky islets, consisting broken cliffs and hills, coasts and corals and a few golden sand coves, surrounded by a coral reef and lagoon, and its white sand beaches.

The group of islets has a drier climate and different habitat from the rain forests that cover most of the Fiji islands. Although not as rich as the rainforest, the plant life of the coast is quite varied, including a number of endemic species. The coast is traditionally home to a number of endangered animals, including terrestrial and marine birds. See List of birds of Fiji. Dry forests are always vulnerable to forest fires, and human intervention. The original vegetation of the coast has been cleared for farming, particularly cattle ranching. There are remains of a coconut plantation. Only two percent of natural dry forest remaining, and it is located in isolated patches, none of which are in protected areas. Dry forests are elected for urban areas, farms and farming communities all along the coast.

Pandanus is common in the littoral habitat, and is a component of strandline and coastal vegetation, including grassy or swampy woodlands, secondary forests, and scrub thickets developed on makatea (raised fossilized coralline limestone terraces). It occurs on the margins of mangroves and swamps, as an understory tree in the plantation of coconut and forest, either planted or naturalized. Associated species of native habitat include creepers such as Ipomoea pes-caprae, Canavalia sericea, and Vigna marina. Other coastal thickets and forest associates include Acacia simplex, Amaroria soulameoides, Tournefortia argentea, Barringtonia asiatica, Bruguiera gymnorhiza, Calophyllum inophyllum, Casuarina equisetifolia, Cerbera manghas, Chrysobalanus icaco, Cocos nucifera, Cordia subcordata, Excoecaria agallocha, Guettarda speciosa, Hernandia nymphaeifolia, Hibiscus tiliaceus, Intsia bijuga, Morinda citrifolia, Podocarpus neriifolius, Santalum insulare, Scaevola taccada, Schleinitzia insularum, Terminalia catappa, Terminalia littoralis, Thespesia populnea, and Vitex trifoliata. Peat swamp associates include Sphagnum cuspidatum and various sedges.

While all pandanus is distributed in the tropical Pacific islands, low islands of the Polynesia and Micronesia are their favorite spot: it covers the barren atolls. The tree is grown and propagated from shoots that form spontaneously in the axils of lower leaves. Its fruit can float and spread to other islands without help from man. The fruit is an edible drupe. They grow wild mainly in seminatural vegetation in littoral habitats throughout the tropical and subtropical Pacific, where it can withstand drought, strong winds, and salt spray. Cocos nucifera was probably aided in many cases by seafaring people. Coconut fruit in the wild is light, buoyant and highly water resistant, and evolved to disperse significant distances via marine currents. It has been collected from the sea as far north as Norway.

With the agreement of the Mataqali Navunaivi of Yanua village, the National Trust of Fiji wild-life experts and other representatives from BirdLife International and Nature Fiji, NTF, with colleagues from the non-government organization BirdLife International, have been restoring the habitat on Monuriki since 2011. In recent years conservationists have scrambled to save these beautiful creatures, scientifically named Brachylophus vitiensis, after it emerged that goats and rats were the biggest threat to their ongoing survival on their picturesque island haven. Although the iguanas have bred on the island for centuries, the emergence of predators and others competing with the same resources on Monuriki has made its future survival difficult.

== History ==
Following the mutiny on HMS Bounty on 28 April 1789, Captain William Bligh was the first westerner to sight this group of 20 islands, when Bligh's open-boat journey made the first passage by Europeans through the Fiji Islands. However, the Yasawas remained largely ignored by the wider world until the United States used them for communication outposts during World War II. On his way to Kupang, Captain Bligh and his crew became the first Europeans to visit several islands in the Fijian island group, which is why the sea area north of Viti Levu, which encloses Monuriki, is named "Bligh Water". Bligh Water, together with the Koro Sea, are situated in the middle of the map of Fiji and more or less separate the north of the country from the south.

The uninhabited island was used as the filming location for the 2000 film Cast Away, starring Tom Hanks. As the sole survivor of a plane crash, he is forced to survive on an island like a modern-day Robinson Crusoe. Since the film, Monuriki has become a tourist attraction.

== In popular culture ==
Monuriki was featured as the anonymous island in the 2000 Robert Zemeckis film Cast Away, starring Tom Hanks; some tourists and travel agents refer to Monuriki as 'Cast Away Island', which is not to be confused with Castaway Island, or Qalito, an actual Fijian island within the Mamanuca Islands.

On April 6, 2026, the cruise ship Fiji Princess ran aground on the island suffering serious damage.

== See also ==
- Desert island
- List of islands
