= List of airports in Fiji =

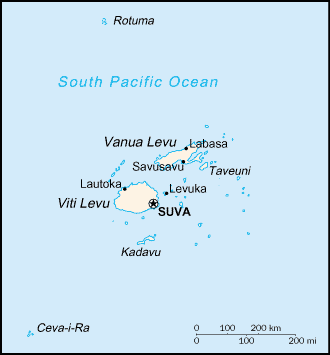
Map of Fiji

This is a list of airports in Fiji, sorted by location.

Fiji, officially the Republic of the Fiji Islands, is an island nation with an approximate population of 920,000, in the South Pacific Ocean about 2,000 km (1,200 mi) north of New Zealand's North Island. Its immediate neighbors are Vanuatu to the west, New Caledonia to the southwest, New Zealand's Kermadec to the southeast, Tonga to the east, Wallis and Futuna to the northeast and Tuvalu to the north. The country comprises an archipelago of more than 332 islands, of which 110 are permanently inhabited, and more than 500 islets, amounting to a total land area of about 18,300 km^{2} (7,100 sq mi). The two major islands, Viti Levu and Vanua Levu, account for 87% of the population of almost 850,000. Fiji's capital and largest city is Suva, located on Viti Levu. Its major partners are Australia, New Zealand, United States, China, Japan, South Korea, India and other nations for its dependence of importation and exportation.

== Airports in Fiji ==
Airports in Fiji

=== International airports ===
Location served	Archipelago	ICAO	IATA	Airport name
Nadi, Viti Levu	Viti Levu Group	NFFN	NAN	**Nadi International Airport**
Nausori / Suva, Viti Levu	Viti Levu Group	NFNA	SUV	**Nausori International Airport**

=== Domestic airports ===
Airport names shown in bold have scheduled passenger service on commercial airlines.

Location served	Archipelago	ICAO	IATA	Airport name
Ba, Viti Levu	Viti Levu Group	NFFA		Ba Airport
Bua, Vanua Levu	Vanua Levu Group	NFNU	BVF	Dama Airport
Castaway Island (Qalito)	Mamanuca Group	NFCS	CST	Castaway Island Heliport
Cicia	Lau Islands	NFCI	ICI	**Cicia Airport**
Gau	Lomaiviti Group	NFNG	NGI	**Gau Airport**
Kaibu	Lau Islands	NFKB		**Kaibu Airport**
Koro	Lomaiviti Group	NFNO	KXF	**Koro Airport**
Labasa, Vanua Levu	Vanua Levu Group	NFNL	LBS	**Labasa Airport**
Lakeba	Lau Islands	NFNK	LKB	**Lakeba Airport**
Laucala	Viti Levu Group	NFNH	LUC	Laucala Airport
Levuka / Bureta, Ovalau	Lomaiviti Group	NFNB	LEV	**Levuka Airfield**
Malolo Lailai (Malololailai)	Mamanuca Group	NFFO	PTF	**Malolo Lailai Airport**
Mana	Mamanuca Group	NFMA	MNF	**Mana Island Airport**
Matei, Taveuni	Vanua Levu Group	NFNM	TVU	**Matei Airport**
Moala	Lau Islands	NFMO	MFJ	**Moala Airport**
Ono-i-Lau	Lau Islands	NFOL	ONU	Ono-i-Lau Airport
Pacific Harbour / Deuba, Viti Levu	Viti Levu Group	NFND	PHR	Pacific Harbour/Deuba Seaplane Base
Rabi	Vanua Levu Group	NFFR	RBI	Rabi Airport
Rotuma	Rotuma	NFNR	RTA	**Rotuma Airport**
Savusavu, Vanua Levu	Vanua Levu Group	NFNS	SVU	**Savusavu Airport**
Vanua Balavu (Vanuabalavu)	Lau Islands	NFVB	VBV	**Vanuabalavu Airport**
Vatukoula, Viti Levu	Viti Levu Group	NFNV	VAU	Vatukoula Airport
Vatulele	Viti Levu Group	NFVL	VTF	Vatulele Airport
Vunisea (Namalata), Kadavu	Kadavu Group	NFKD	KDV	**Vunisea Airport**
Wakaya	Lomaiviti Group	NFNW	KAY	Wakaya Airport
Yasawa	Yasawa Group	NFSW	YAS	Yasawa Island Airport

== See also ==
- Transport in Fiji
- List of airports by ICAO code: N#NF - Fiji, Tonga
- Wikipedia:WikiProject Aviation/Airline destination lists: Oceania#Fiji
