= Tivua Island =

Island in Fiji

Tivua
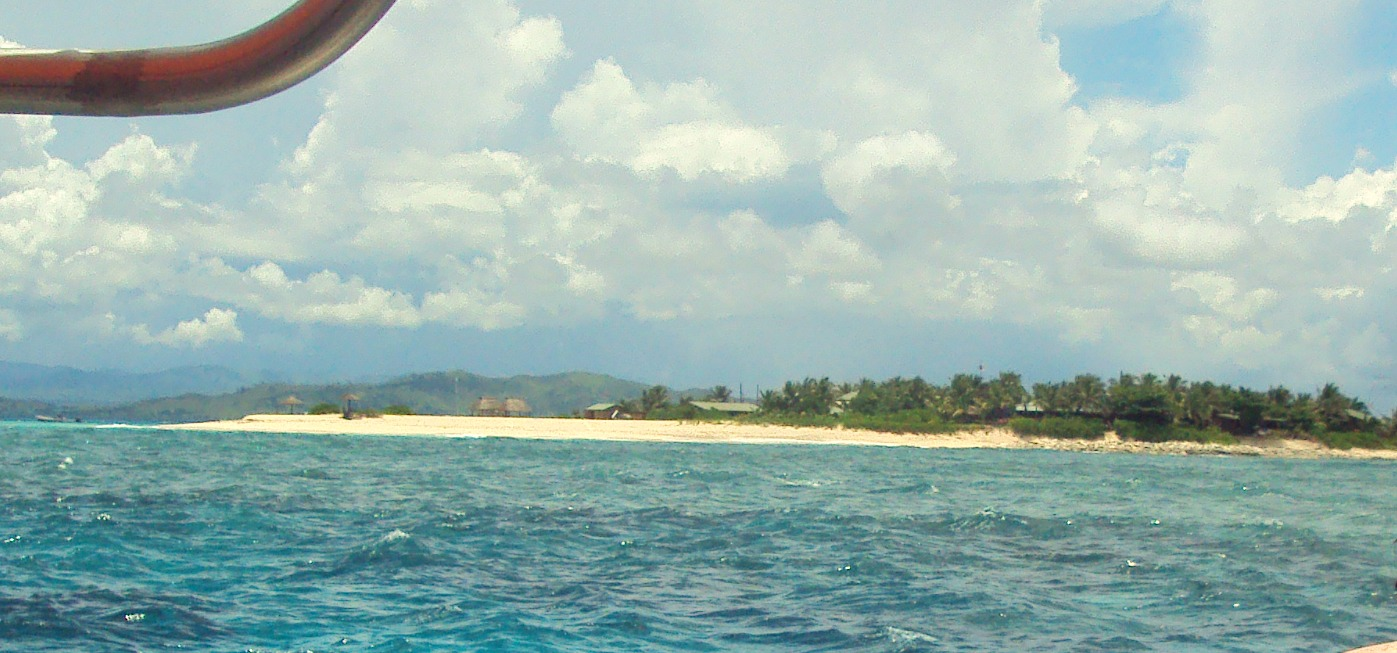
- Tivua Island, Mamanuca Group, Fiji
- Interactive map of Tivua

Geography
- Location: South Pacific
- Coordinates: 17.6140347°S 177.344349°E
- Archipelago: Mamanuca Islands

Administration
- Fiji
- Division: Western
- Province: Ba Province
- Tikina: Vuda

Demographics
- Population: 0

Tivua Island is an island of the Mamanuca Islands, Fiji.

Tivua is a small coral cay located in the northeastern part of the Mamanuca group of islands, northeast of Kadavulailai and Lovuka islands. The island is fringed with white sand and is surrounded by 500 acres (202 hectares) of reef.

The island can be walked around in 15 minutes and contains 2 bures (traditional Fijian huts) that are used as accommodation for guests. Captain Cook Cruises operates day cruises to Tivua.

Tivua is primarily accessed via Port Denerau, with cruising time of approximately 90 minutes from port to the island.

Tivua Island has a tropical climate with the rainy season December to February.

The island is currently not inhabited by a local population, but rather serves as a destination for day tourists.

== See also ==
- List of islands
