= Nautanivono =

Island in Fiji

Native name: Yadua
- Interactive map of Nautanivono

Geography
- Location: South Pacific
- Coordinates: 17.628853°S 177.1248666°E
- Archipelago: Mamanuca Islands

Administration
- Fiji
- Division: Western
- Province: Nadroga-Navosa Province
- District: Malolo

Demographics
- Population: unknown

Nautonivono is a privately leased island, also called Yadua (pronounced [janˈdua]).

The island is located at the centre of Fiji's Mamanuca Islands, east of Tavua Island and northeast of Mana.

It was used as a filming location for the "Edge of Extinction" in Survivor: Edge of Extinction and Survivor: Winners at War.
