= Kadomo =

Island of the Mamanuca Islands, Fiji

- Interactive map of Kadomo

Geography
- Location: South Pacific
- Coordinates: 17°29′33″S 177°3′7″E
- Archipelago: Mamanuca Islands
- Area: 0.53 km^{2} (0.20 sq mi)
- Highest elevation: 100 m (300 ft)

Administration
- Fiji
- Division: Western
- Province: Nadroga-Navosa Province
- District: Malolo

Demographics
- Population: unknown

Kadomo is an island within the Mamanuca Islands of Fiji in the South Pacific. The islands are a part of the Fiji's Western Division.

== Geography ==
Kadomo a high volcanic island. It is located south of Navadra and north of Yanuya and Tokoriki and just 50 kilometers (31 miles) from the Fiji's Nadi International Airport.
