= Malamala Island =

Island of the Mamanuca Islands, Fiji

Nickname: Daydream Island
- Interactive map of Malamala Island

Geography
- Location: South Pacific
- Coordinates: 17.7237°S 177.27523°E
- Archipelago: Mamanuca Islands
- Area: 0.046 km^{2} (0.018 sq mi)
- Highest elevation: 5 m (16 ft)

Administration
- Fiji
- Division: Western
- Province: Nadroga-Navosa Province

Demographics
- Population: 0

Additional information
- Official website: Official

Malamala is a tiny islet within the Mamanuca Islands of Fiji in the South Pacific. The islands are a part of the Fiji's Western Division.

== Geography ==
The islet is also known as Daydream Island. There is a private resort (Malamala Beach Club) there. The islet is located east of Malolo and southwest of Vunivadra and just 25 minutes from Port Denarau.
