= Navini =

Island of the Mamanuca Islands, Fiji

Coordinates: 17.7216368°S 177.1713962°E

- Interactive map of Navini

Geography
- Location: South Pacific
- Archipelago: Mamanuca Islands
- Area: 0.09 km^{2} (0.035 sq mi)
- Highest elevation: 3 m (10 ft)

Administration
- Fiji
- Division: Western
- Province: Nadroga-Navosa Province

Demographics
- Population: 0

Additional information
- Official website: Official

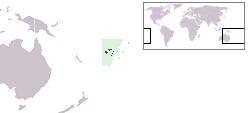
Geographical location of Fiji (green)

Navini is a small, private island within the Mamanuca Islands of Fiji in the South Pacific. The islands are a part of the Fiji's Western Division.

== Geography ==
Navini is a tiny reef island, located northeast of Malolo and northwest of Malamala islands. There is a small private resort there.
