= Monu Island =

Island in Mamanuca Islands, Fiji

Coordinates: 17°36′S 177°03′E

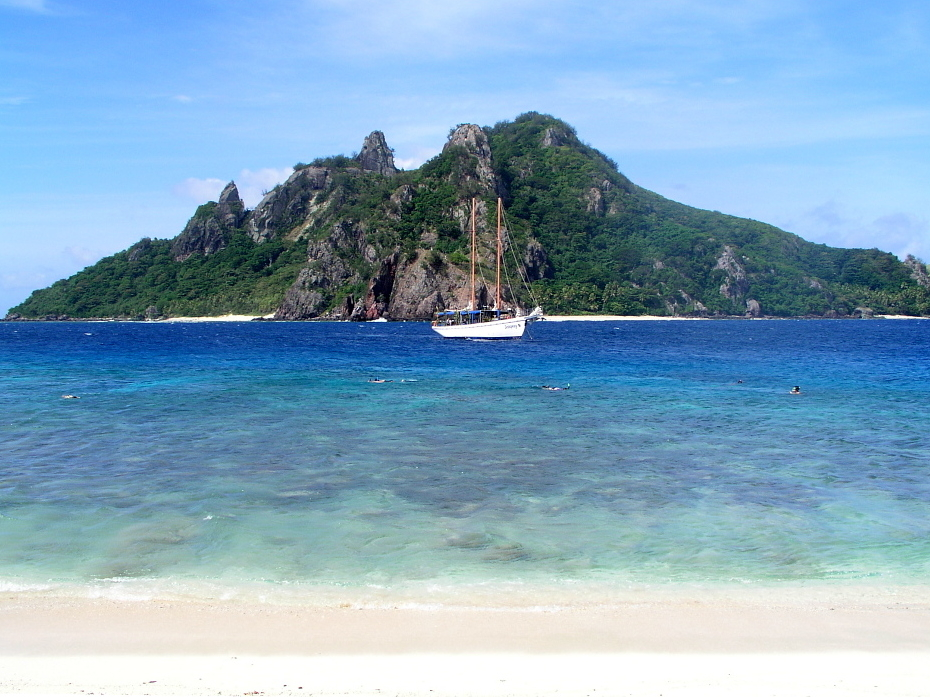
- Monu Island in 2006
- Interactive map of Monu Island

Geography
- Location: South Pacific
- Archipelago: Mamanuca Islands

Administration
- Fiji
- Division: Western
- Province: Nadroga-Navosa Province
- District: Malolo

Demographics
- Population: 0

Monu Island is an uninhabited island of the Mamanuca Islands, Fiji. It is located 700 metres west of Yanuya. It is 1,370 metres long from north to south, and up to 1,070 metres wide.

== See also ==
- Desert island
- List of islands
