= Wadigi Island =

Island of the Mamanuca Islands, Fiji

- Interactive map of Wadigi Island

Geography
- Location: South Pacific
- Coordinates: 17.7495378°S 177.1130004°E
- Archipelago: Mamanuca Islands
- Area: 0.022 km^{2} (0.0085 sq mi)
- Highest elevation: 37 m (121 ft)

Administration
- Fiji
- Division: Western
- Province: Nadroga-Navosa Province
- District: Malolo

Wadigi is a tiny islet within the Mamanuca Islands of Fiji in the South Pacific. The islands are a part of the Fiji's Western Division.

== Geography ==
The islet is located just west of Malolo and only 10 minutes by helicopter from the Nadi International Airport. There is a private resort there. The islet has two pristine beaches for swimming, diving, and snorkelling.
