= Matamanoa =

Island of the Mamanuca Islands, Fiji

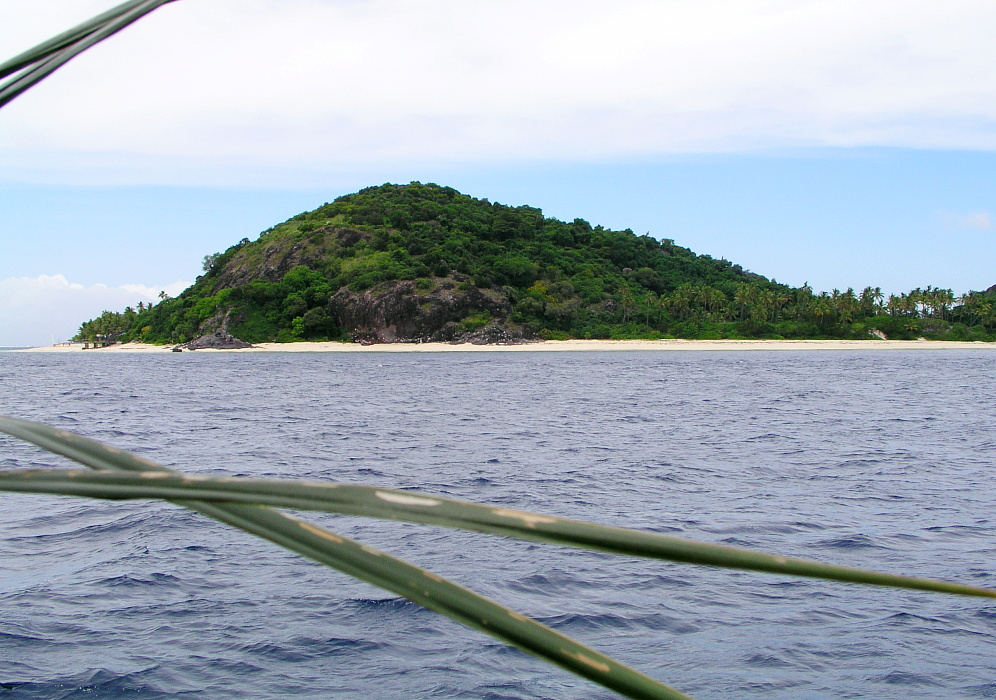
- Interactive map of Matamanoa

Geography
- Location: South Pacific
- Coordinates: 17°37′32″S 177°01′56″E
- Archipelago: Mamanuca Islands
- Area: 19.85 km^{2} (7.66 sq mi)
- Highest elevation: 32 m (105 ft)

Administration
- Fiji
- Division: Western
- Province: Nadroga-Navosa Province
- District: Malolo

Demographics
- Population: unknown

Matamanoa is a small, private island within the Mamanuca Islands of Fiji in the South Pacific. The islands are a part of the Fiji's Western Division.

== Geography ==
The island is located southwest of Tavua and northwest of Mana and 30 km west of Viti Levu (one of the main islands of the Fiji archipelago). Matamanoa can be reached by sea or by helicopter directly from Nadi International Airport. The island has a beach of fine white sand that surrounds it almost entirely—and lush vegetation that covers the hilly interior. The lagoon is not very wide due to the presence of the reef. The island shape suggests that it is a former volcanic cone.

The island is home to a secluded private resort.

== See also ==
- List of islands
