= Tokoriki =

Island of the Mamanuca Islands, Fiji

Coordinates: 17°35′S 177°06′E

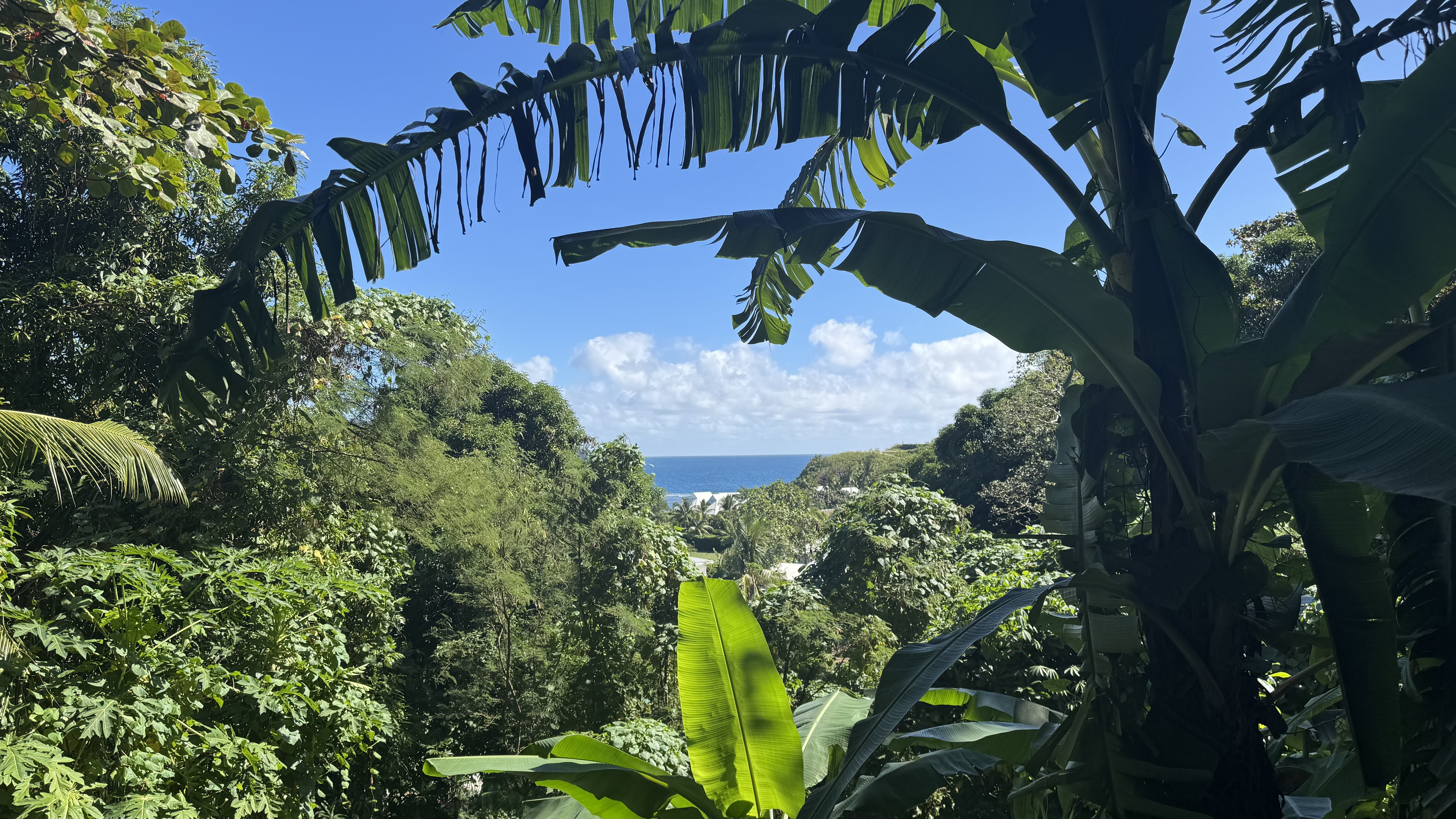
- A lookout in Tokoriki
- Interactive map of Tokoriki

Geography
- Location: South Pacific
- Archipelago: Mamanuca Islands
- Area: 0.88 km^{2} (0.34 sq mi)
- Length: 1.9 km (1.18 mi)
- Width: 0.8 km (0.5 mi)
- Highest elevation: 77 m (253 ft)

Administration
- Fiji
- Division: Western
- Province: Nadroga-Navosa Province
- District: Malolo

Demographics
- Population: unknown

Tokoriki is an island within the Mamanuca Islands of Fiji in the South Pacific. It is located east of Yanuya and north of Tavua Island.

== Resorts ==
It is home to two independent resorts, the privately owned luxury award winning resort Tokoriki Island Resort for honeymooners and couples and nearby is the Marriott Sheraton Resort & Spa. The island has its own reef which has many diving and snorkeling sites.
