= Kadavulailai =

Island of the Mamanuca Islands, Fiji

Nickname: Bounty Island
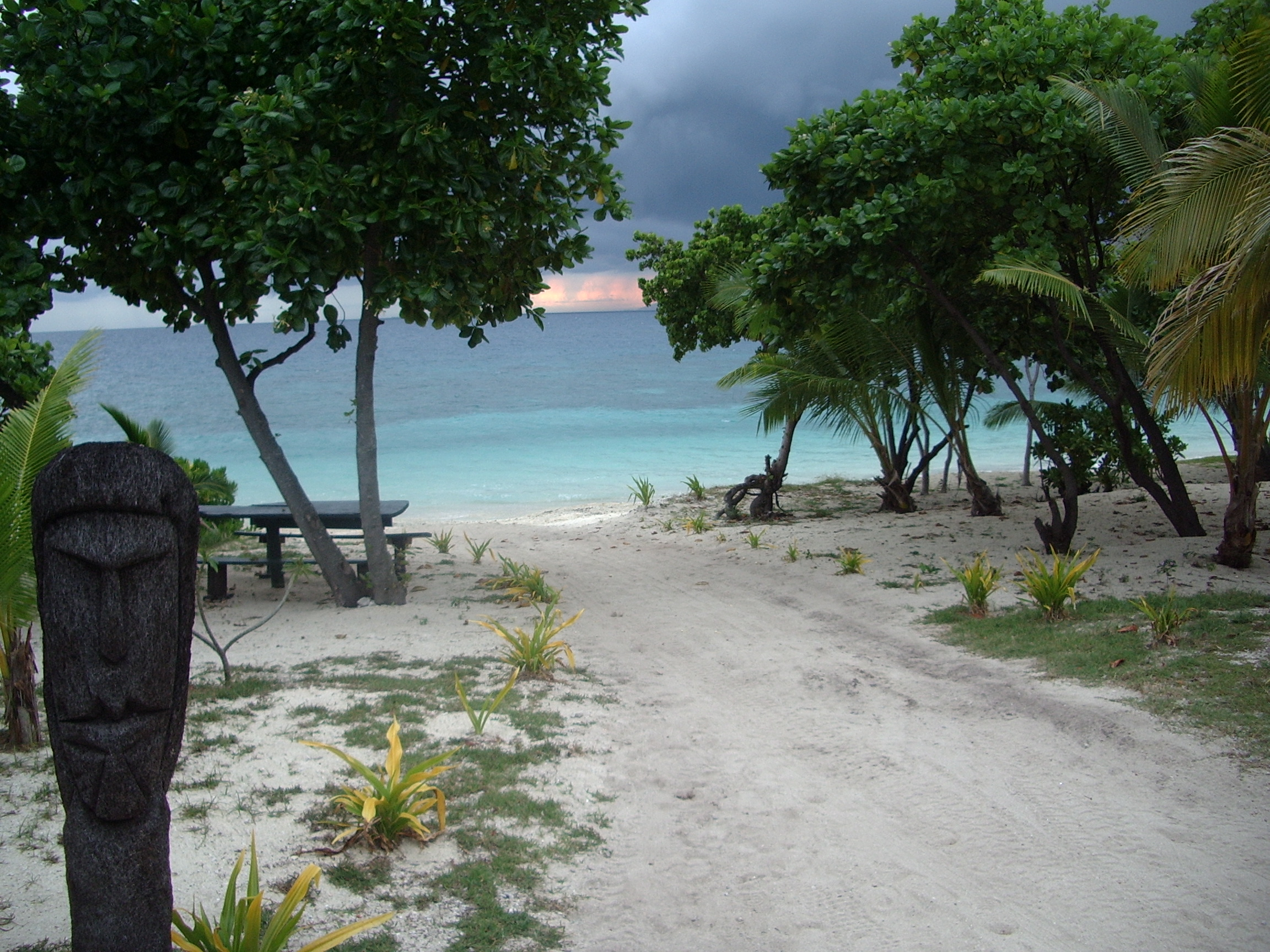
- Interactive map of Kadavulailai

Geography
- Location: South Pacific
- Coordinates: 17.67305919°S 177.3083884°E
- Archipelago: Mamanuca Islands
- Area: 0.28 km^{2} (0.11 sq mi)
- Highest elevation: 3 m (10 ft)

Administration
- Fiji
- Division: Western
- Province: Ba Province
- Tikina: Vuda

Demographics
- Population: unknown

Kadavulailai (also known as Bounty Island) is a small, private island within the Mamanuca Islands of Fiji in the South Pacific. The islands are a part of the Fiji's Western Division.

== Geography ==
Kadavulailai is a low reef island, located southeast of Treasure Island and north of South Sea Island. It s home to a private resort. There are lots of sandy beaches on one side, with more rocky exposed beaches on the other.
