= Navadra =

Island in Mamanuca Islands, Fiji

- Interactive map of Navadra

Geography
- Location: South Pacific
- Coordinates: 17.4556669°S 177.0472231°E
- Archipelago: Mamanuca Islands

Administration
- Fiji
- Division: Western
- Province: Nadroga-Navosa Province

Demographics
- Population: 0 (2024)

Navadra is a volcanic island located in the Mamanuca Group of Fiji. It is uninhabited, but has an anchorage where local fishermen and visiting yachts anchor. It is located south of Eori and north of Kadomo islands.

== Transportation ==
Navadra is accessible by boat.

== See also ==
- Desert island
- List of islands
