= Beachcomber Island =

Island of the Mamanuca Islands, Fiji

Beachcomber
Native name: Tai
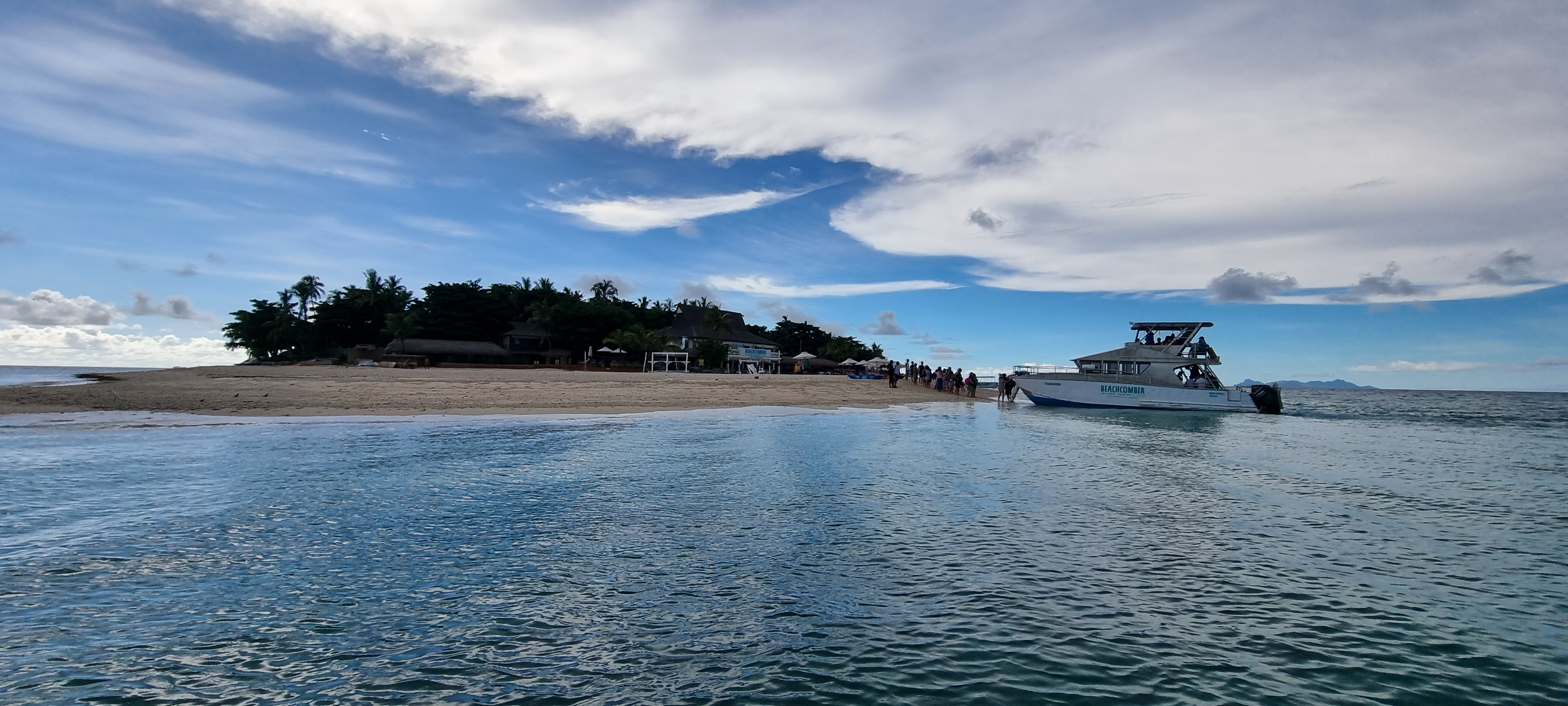
- Beachcomber Island pictured in 2026.
- Interactive map of Beachcomber

Geography
- Location: South Pacific
- Coordinates: 17.654259°S 177.254851°E
- Archipelago: Mamanuca Islands
- Area: 0.08 km^{2} (0.031 sq mi)
- Highest elevation: 4 m (13 ft)

Administration
- Fiji
- Division: Western
- Province: Ba Province
- Tikina: Vuda

Demographics
- Population: unknown

Additional information
- Official website: Official

Beachcomber Island is a private island within the Mamanuca Islands of Fiji in the South Pacific, which in turn are a part of Fiji's Western Division.

Being one of the closest islands to Denarau, it has been a key tourism icon of the South Pacific since its development.

In November 2024, it was purchased by brothers, Brendon and Mark Deeley (owners of Vision Hotels Australia and Iririki Island Resort in Vanuatu) who started a $10m redevelopment of the resort.

== Geography ==
Beachcomber Island, also known as Tai, is one of the resort islands of Fiji, located west of Treasure Island (Lovuka) and about 18 km west of Lautoka, the second largest city of the state, located on the main island of Viti Levu. Beachcomber is also called barefoot island, as it is common on the island not to wear shoes.

The original name Tai was changed to Beachcomber Island in the 1960s, mainly to make the island more attractive to tourists. The island is mainly used for tourism, for water sports such as swimming, snorkeling, and diving as well as motor water sports such as jet skiing, water skiing, and motor boating.

The port is situated on the north side of the island.

== See also ==
- List of islands
