= Mana Island (Fiji) =

Island of the Mamanuca Islands, Fiji

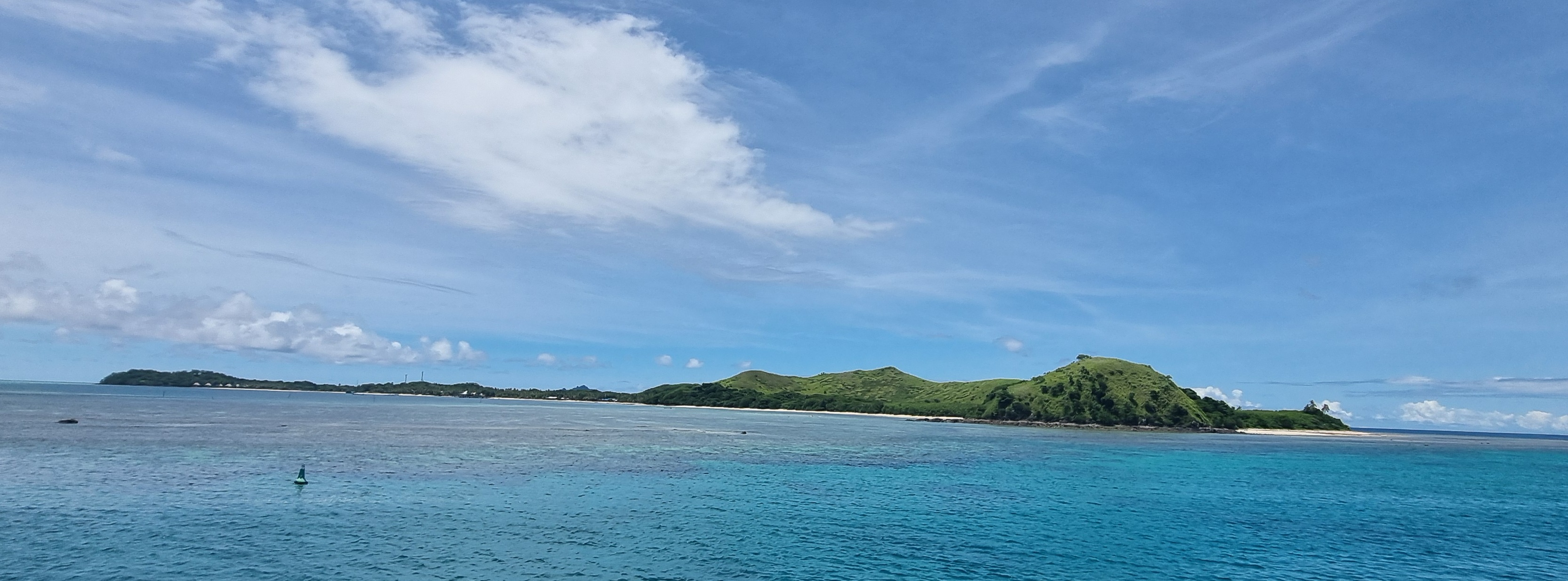
- Mana Island pictured in 2026.
- Interactive map of Mana Island

Geography
- Location: South Pacific
- Coordinates: 17.67318°S 177.10768°E
- Archipelago: Mamanuca Islands
- Area: 1.75 km^{2} (0.68 sq mi)
- Highest elevation: 70 m (230 ft)

Administration
- Fiji
- Division: Western
- Province: Nadroga-Navosa Province
- District: Malolo

Demographics
- Population: unknown

Mana Island belongs to the Mamanuca Islands, Fiji. It is Survivor Island, where the reality survival show is set and recorded. Mana was used as a tribe name in Survivor: Game Changers. The islands Malolo and Qalito are to the south and Matamanoa and Tavua are located north of the island.

== Facilities ==
Mana Island Airport is located there. The island is a home to a private resort.
