= EORI =

EORI may refer to:

- Eori, an island of Fiji
- EORI number, an EU identification number for the import or export of goods
