= Castaway Island =

Island in Fiji

Castaway Island Qalito
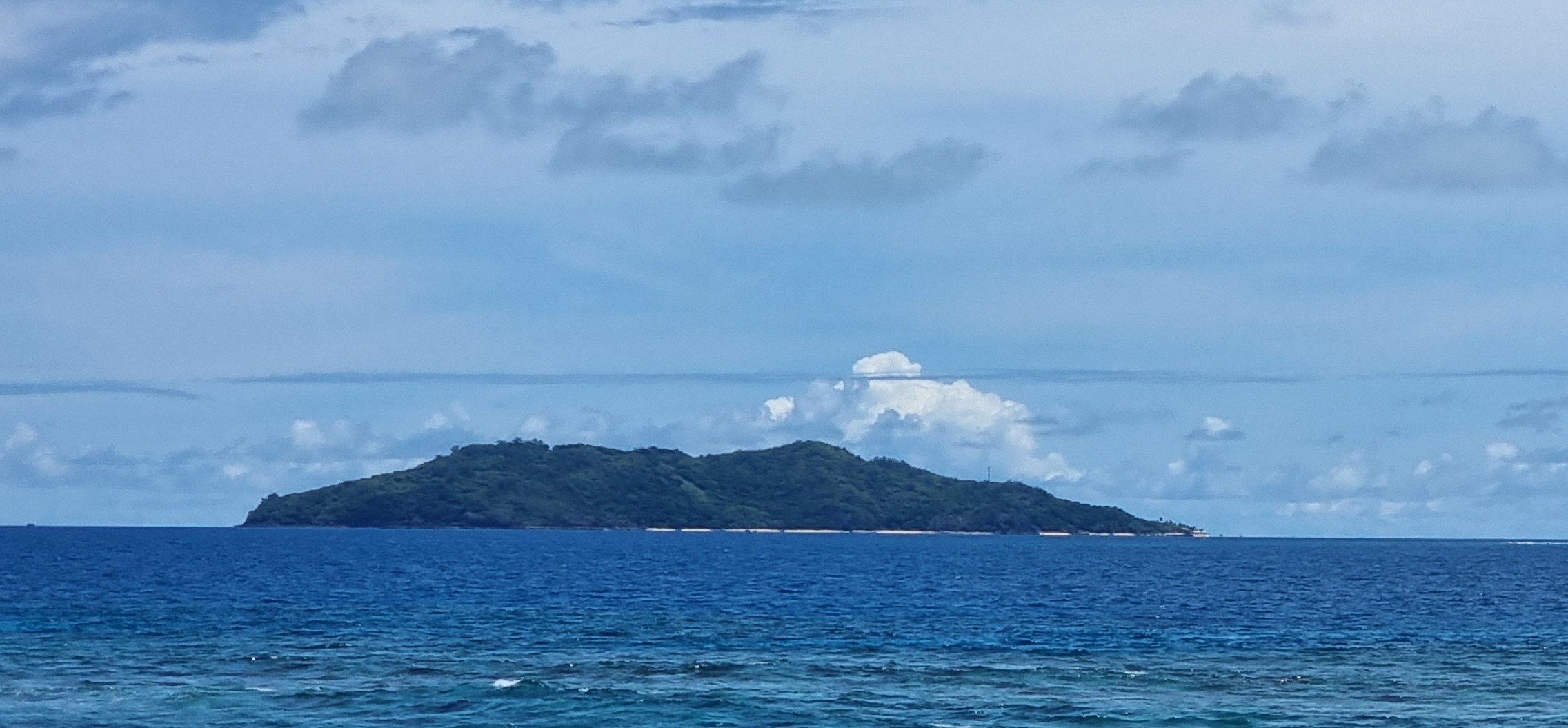
- Castaway (Qalito) Island pictured in 2026

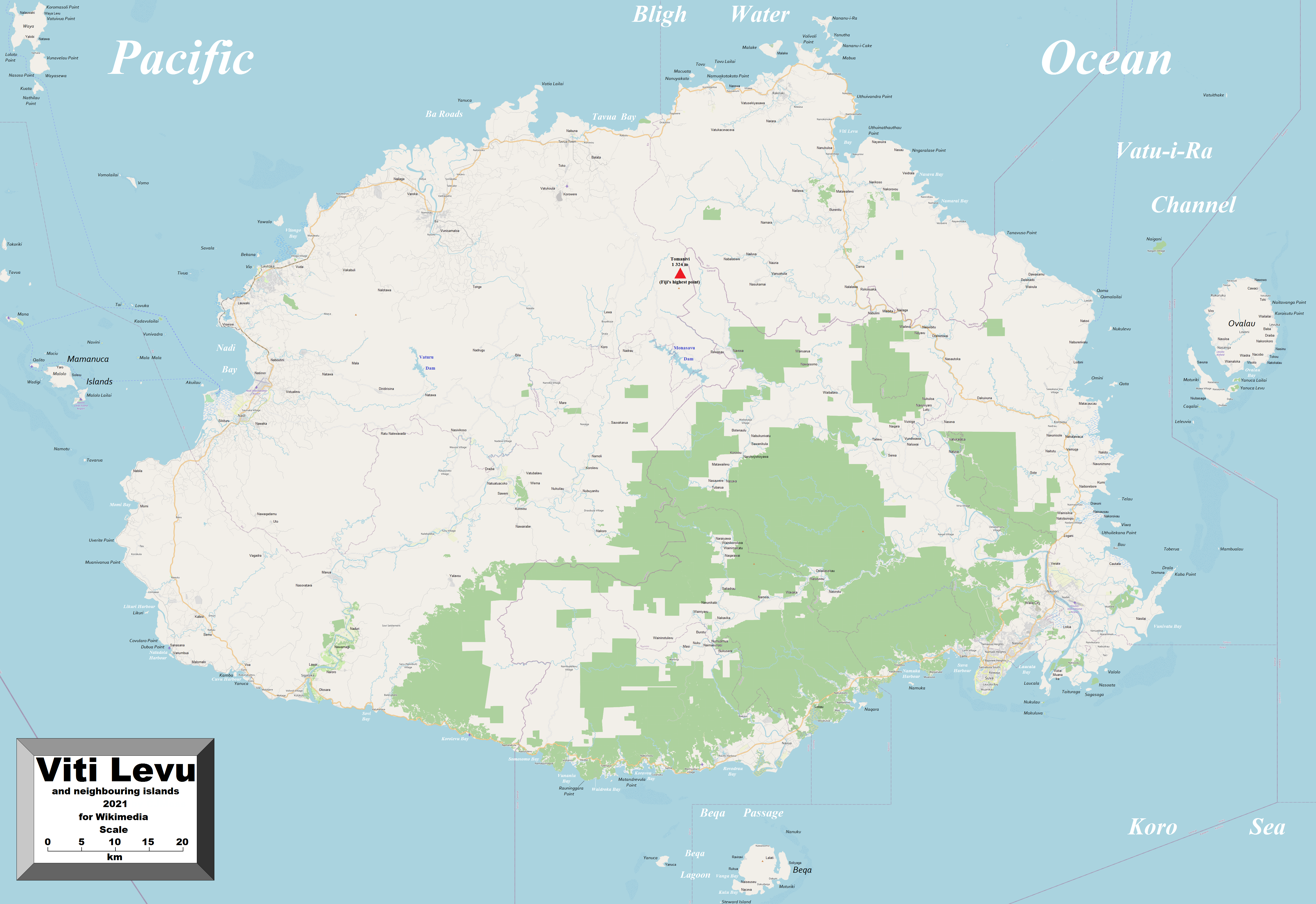
- Viti Levu with Qalito off the west coast

- Location in Fiji
- Country: Fiji
- Archipelago: Mamanuca
- Division: Western Division
- Province: Nadroga-Navosa
- District: Malolo

Area
  - Land: 0.27 sq mi (0.7 km^{2})
- Time zone: UTC+12

Castaway Island (or Qalito) is an island of the Mamanuca Group in Fiji. It is inhabited, with a tourist resort on its west side. The island has an area of 70 hectares (170 acres).

== Geography and transportation ==
Castaway Island is located off the northeast tip of Malolo and south of Mana islands and about 20 kilometres (12 mi) offshore from Nadi International Airport. It is accessible by either boat, seaplane or helicopter. The sea trip takes about 1 hour and 50 minutes, travelling past several other Mamanuca Islands.

== Traditional Fijian name and present-day use ==
Known traditionally by the Fijians as “Qalito”, Castaway Island today is a private island resort used for holidays and vacations - in particular honeymoons and family holiday vacations.

== Island inhabitants ==
The Fijian resort staff live on-island in a staff village. The bulk of the staff are from the Main island of Viti Levu.
