= Cast Away =

2000 film by Robert Zemeckis

- Theatrical release poster
- Directed by: Robert Zemeckis
- Written by: William Broyles Jr.
- Produced by: Steve Starkey; Tom Hanks; Robert Zemeckis; Jack Rapke
- Starring: Tom Hanks; Helen Hunt; Nick Searcy
- Cinematography: Don Burgess
- Edited by: Arthur Schmidt
- Music by: Alan Silvestri
- Production companies: 20th Century Fox; DreamWorks Pictures; ImageMovers; Playtone
- Distributed by: 20th Century Fox (United States and Canada); DreamWorks Pictures (through United International Pictures, international)
- Release date: December 22, 2000
- Running time: 143 minutes
- Country: United States
- Language: English
- Budget: $90 million
- Box office: $429.6 million

Cast Away is a 2000 American survival drama film directed and co-produced by Robert Zemeckis, written by William Broyles Jr. and starring Tom Hanks, Helen Hunt, and Nick Searcy. Hanks plays a FedEx troubleshooter who is stranded on a deserted island after his plane crashes in the South Pacific, and the plot focuses on his desperate attempts to survive and return home. Filming took place from January to March 1999, and April to May 2000.

Cast Away was released on December 22, 2000, by 20th Century Fox in the United States and Canada and by DreamWorks Pictures through United International Pictures in other territories. It grossed $429.6 million worldwide, making it the third-highest-grossing film of 2000. The film received generally positive reviews from critics, who praised the screenplay and Hanks's performance. Hanks won Best Actor – Motion Picture Drama at the 58th Golden Globe Awards and was nominated for Best Actor in a Leading Role at the 73rd Academy Awards.

== Plot ==
In December 1995, a FedEx courier collects a package from a sculptor, whose gate carries the names "Dick & Bettina". The package, marked with pink angel wings, is delivered to her husband, who is in Moscow with another woman.

Meanwhile, Chuck Noland is a FedEx systems analyst who travels the world resolving productivity problems. He lives with his girlfriend Kelly Frears in Memphis, Tennessee. They talk of getting married but experience setbacks because Chuck is constantly called away to work, straining their relationship. During a Christmas dinner, Chuck experiences a recurring toothache just before he is summoned to resolve a FedEx problem in Malaysia. Before Chuck leaves, Kelly gives him her grandfather's pocket watch with a photo of her in it. He gives her a small box, saying she can wait to open it on New Year's Eve when he returns, implying that it is an engagement ring.

The FedEx cargo plane Chuck boards is off-course and out of radio contact due to a severe storm, and it crashes into the Pacific Ocean, leaving Chuck as the only survivor. He deploys an inflatable liferaft during the crash, but the attached survival kit rips free and is lost. After Chuck washes ashore on a deserted island, he discovers several FedEx packages washing up on shore as well, and eventually the body of one of the pilots, Albert Miller, which he buries. In the following days, Chuck struggles to locate food and water. After seeing a ship far away on the horizon, he tries to escape the island on the inflatable raft but is pushed back by waves, during which his leg is badly injured on a reef and the raft is irreparably punctured.

Realizing that it is unlikely he will be rescued, Chuck opens most of the FedEx packages, finding items he uses to improve his living conditions. However, he does not open a package with golden wings painted on it, thinking the wings have symbolic meaning. While attempting to start a fire, Chuck cuts his hand and furiously throws several objects including a Wilson volleyball, leaving a bloody handprint on the ball. He draws a face in the blood, names the ball Wilson, and adopts it as a surrogate companion. Chuck gradually acquires survival skills, including firestarting, spearfishing, and opening coconuts, but he realizes the chances of his rescue are low because the plane was so far off course when it went down. Chuck contemplates suicide. Because of the severe toothache, he performs his own extraction using a rock and the blade of an ice skate.

Four years later, Chuck, now bearded and disheveled, has adapted to life alone on the island. After a plastic section of a portable toilet enclosure washes up, he begins constructing a raft. He waits for the prevailing wind to make its annual shift to a favorable direction, then uses the panels as a makeshift sail to boost him through the surf, escaping the island with Wilson and the unopened FedEx package secured to the raft. A strong storm destroys the sail and severely damages the raft, and Wilson is dislodged and floats away. Devastated, Chuck loses all hope, discarding his oars and surrendering to fate. A passing container ship rescues a semi-conscious Chuck on the remnants of the raft.

After four weeks, Chuck returns to the United States, where he was presumed dead. As he is given a hero's welcome at the FedEx headquarters in Memphis, he is met by his endodontist, and now Kelly's husband, Dr. Jerry Lovett, who says Kelly is emotionally unable to greet him. Later that night, he visits Kelly and discovers she has a daughter. Chuck returns the pocket watch so it can remain as an heirloom within Kelly's family. Kelly shows him that she has kept his Jeep Cherokee, and gives it back to him. They share a passionate kiss and confess their love for each other. For a brief moment, it seems Kelly might drive off with Chuck, but then they both realize she cannot leave her family, and she goes back into her house.

Later, Chuck tells his friend Stan that he will miss Kelly, but his experience has taught him that he must move on. Chuck drives to Texas to return the angel-winged package to the address of the sender: the sculptor's home, where the gate now reads only "Bettina". A sculpture of golden wings stands in the yard. Finding no one home, Chuck leaves the package at the door with a note saying that it saved his life. He drives away and stops at a crossroads. The sculptor, in a pickup truck, stops and tells him where each road leads. As she drives off, Chuck notices the same angel wings painted on the tailgate of her truck. He looks down each road and smiles as he faces the road taken by her truck.

== Cast ==
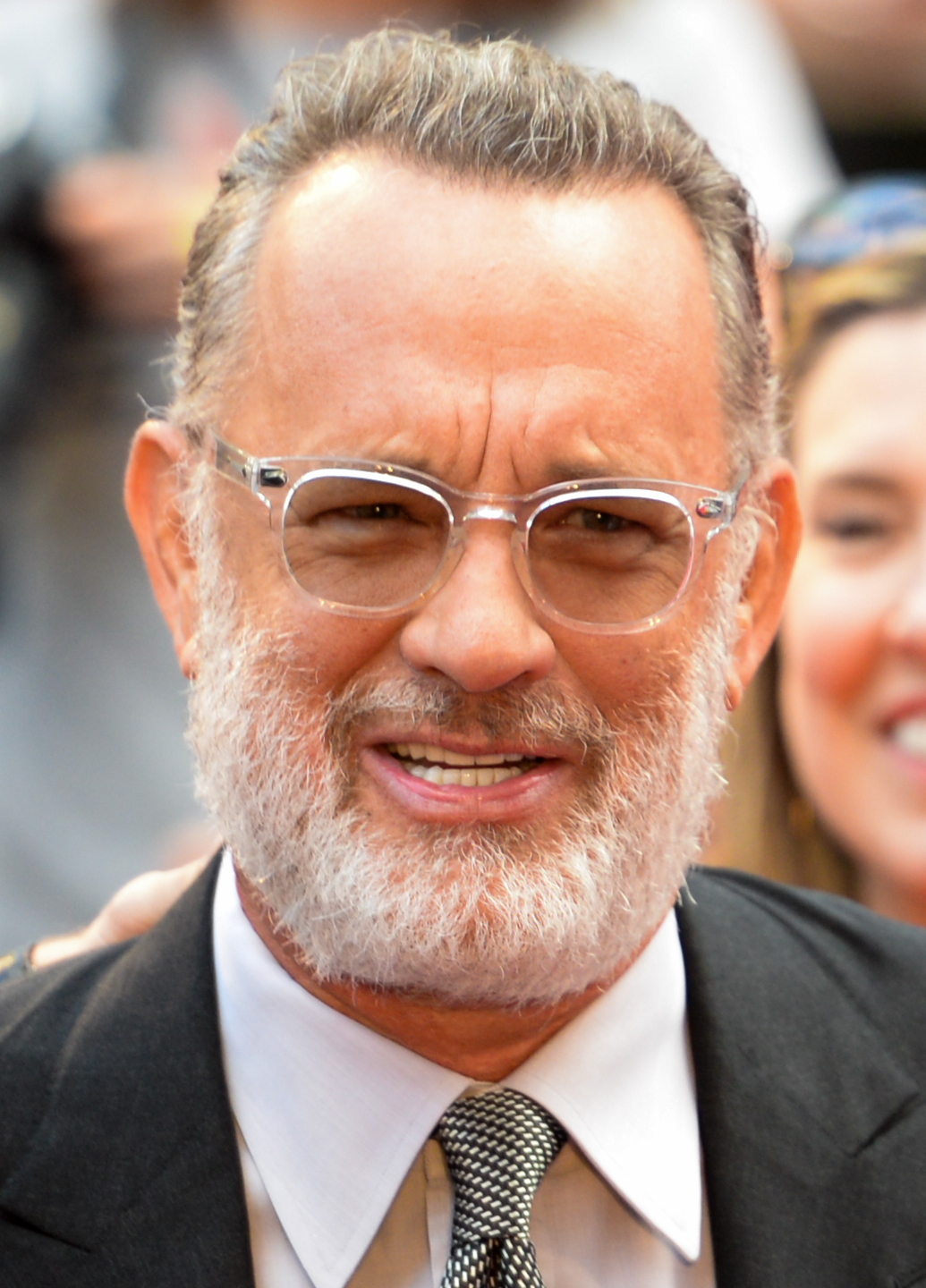
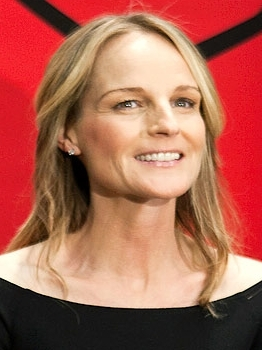
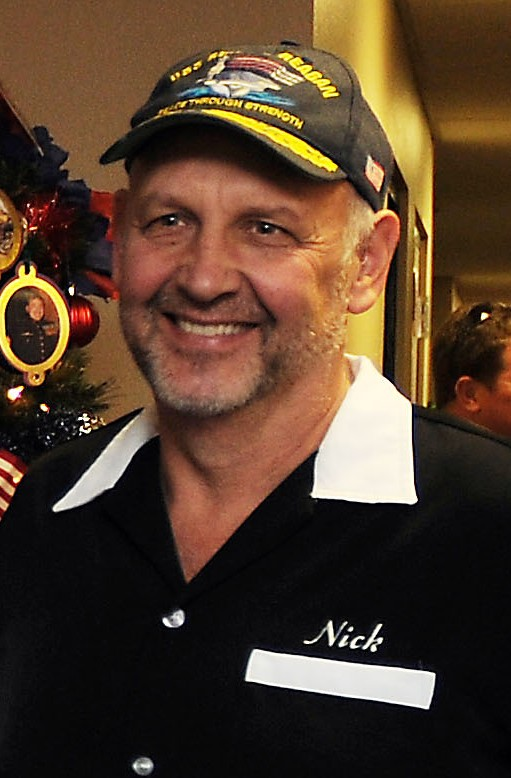
(Left to right) Tom Hanks (pictured in 2019), Helen Hunt (2011), and Nick Searcy (2014)
- Tom Hanks as Chuck Noland, a FedEx systems analyst
- Helen Hunt as Kelly Frears, Chuck's girlfriend
- Nick Searcy as Stan, Chuck's best friend and co-worker
- Jenifer Lewis as Becca Twig
- Geoffrey Blake as Maynard Graham
- Peter Von Berg as Yuri
- Chris Noth as Dr. Gerald "Jerry" Lovett, an endodontist who is later Kelly's husband
- Lari White as Bettina Peterson, a sculptor
- Michael Forest as Pilot Jack
- Viveka Davis as Pilot Gwen
- Nan Martin as Kelly's mother
- Dennis Letts as Dennis Larson
- Valerie Wildman as Virginia Larson
- Steve Monroe as Steve Larson
- Elden Henson as Elden Madden
- Timothy Stack as Morgan Stockton
- Joe Conley as Joe Wally
- Vin Martin as Pilot Albert "Al" Miller, a FedEx pilot who is buried by Chuck on the island
- Garret Davis as Pilot Blaine
- Jay Acovone as Pilot Peter
- Fred Smith as himself

== Production ==
=== Development ===
Cast Away marked the second collaboration between Robert Zemeckis and Tom Hanks, following Forrest Gump in 1994. In January 1999, Helen Hunt, who had previously worked on Twister and As Good as It Gets, was hired to play the role of Kelly Frears in the film.

In a 2017 Actor Roundtable with The Hollywood Reporter, Tom Hanks stated

I made Cast Away because I wanted to examine the concept of four years of hopelessness, in which you have none of the requirements for living—food, water, shelter, fire and company. But it took us six years to put together the alliance that would actually examine that. I only had a third of it, and Bill Broyles only had a third of it, until Bob Zemeckis comes along and provided that other third. I had that original idea. I was reading an article about FedEx, and I realized that 747s filled with packages fly across the Pacific three times a day. And I just thought, "What happens if that goes down?"

— Tom Hanks in 2017

=== Filming ===
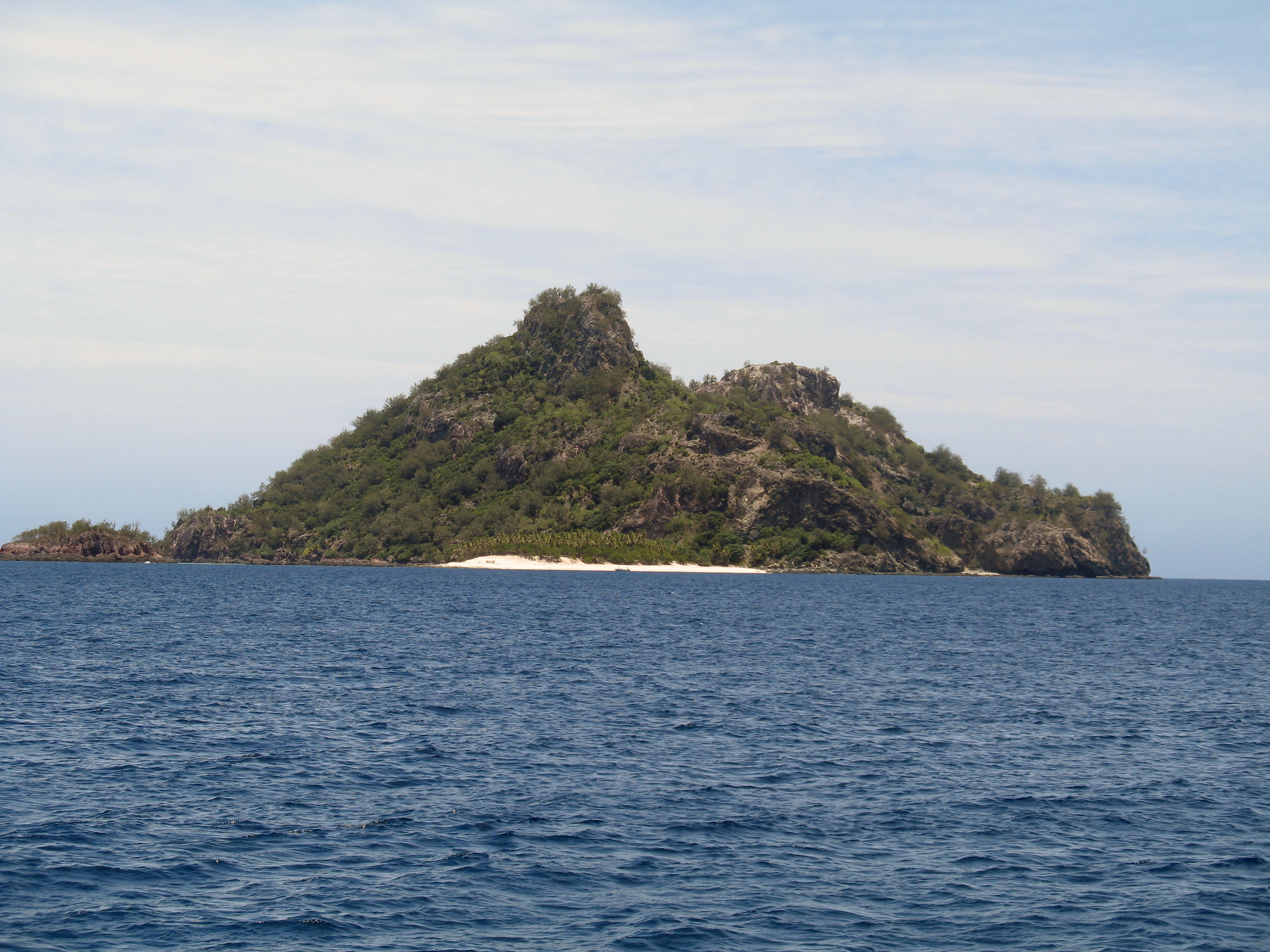
The island of Monuriki

The film was not shot chronologically. It began on January 18, 1999, before halting two months later. Filming resumed on April 3, 2000, and finished the following month. Hanks gained 50 pounds (23 kg) during pre-production to make his physical transformation more dramatic. After most of the film was shot, production was paused so he could lose the weight and grow his hair and beard to look like he had been living on the island for years. Another four-month production halt preceded the filming of the return scenes. During the year-long hiatus, Zemeckis used the same film crew to make another film, What Lies Beneath. While the film was in production, Hanks nearly died when he suffered an infected cut on his leg. He was rushed to a local hospital to undergo surgery and stayed there for three days. Filming of Cast Away was suspended for three weeks to allow Hanks to recover from the injury. Filming lasted for sixteen months.

Cast Away was filmed on Monuriki, one of the Mamanuca Islands in Fiji. It is in a subgroup of the Mamanuca archipelago, which is sited off the coast of Viti Levu, Fiji's largest island. The island became a tourist attraction after the film's release. After Chuck's return, it is identified by Kelly as being "about 600 miles [970 km] south of the Cook Islands," but there is no land between the southernmost Cook Islands of Mangaia and Antarctica.

The film begins and ends in the same location, on the Arrington Ranch in the Texas Panhandle south of the city of Canadian, Texas.

=== Music ===
The film's minimal score was composed and conducted by Alan Silvestri for which he won a Grammy Award in 2002. The film's soundtrack is most notable for its lack of score and creature sound effects (such as bird song or insect sounds) while Chuck is on the island, which is intended to reinforce the feeling of isolation. Cast Away contains no original musical score until Chuck escapes the island. However, there is a Russian choral piece heard near the start of the film that was not composed or even recorded by Silvestri, so it does not appear on the film's soundtrack list. It is a traditional Russian song written by Lev Knipper called "Oh, My Field" ("Polyushko, Polye") and it is available on various collections of Red Army hymns.

The official soundtrack CD is an anthology of musical pieces from all the films up to that point that were directed by Zemeckis and scored by Silvestri. The only track from Cast Away itself is the theme from the end credits. The album was released in 2001 by soundtrack specialty label Varèse Sarabande, rather than by Fox Music or DreamWorks Records, which were the in-house labels of 20th Century Fox and DreamWorks Pictures.

The soundtrack featured in Cast Away consists of 10 tracks, with performers including Elvis Presley, Chuck Berry, and Charles Brown.

=== FedEx ===
FedEx provided access to their facilities (Memphis, Los Angeles, and Moscow) as well as airplanes, trucks, uniforms, and logistical support. A team of FedEx marketers oversaw production through more than two years of filming. FedEx CEO Fred Smith made an appearance as himself for the scene where Chuck is welcomed back, which was filmed on location at FedEx's home facilities in Memphis, Tennessee. The idea of a story based on a FedEx plane crashing gave the company "a heart attack at first", but the overall story was seen as positive. FedEx, which paid no money for product placement in the film, saw an increase in brand awareness in Asia and Europe following the film's release.

=== Wilson the volleyball ===
Wilson the volleyball

In the film, Wilson the volleyball serves as Chuck Noland's personified friend and only companion during the four years that Noland spends alone on a deserted island. Named after the volleyball's manufacturer, Wilson Sporting Goods, the character was created by screenwriter William Broyles Jr. While researching for the film, he consulted with professional survival experts, and then chose to deliberately strand himself for one week on an isolated beach in the Gulf of California, to force himself to search for water and food, and obtain his own shelter. During this time, a Wilson-branded soccer ball washed up on shore, providing the inspiration for the film's inanimate companion. When the idea was presented to Tom Hanks, he happily agreed on the volleyball as a memento to his wife, Rita Wilson, knowing he would be away from home for a long period for filming. From a screenwriting point of view, Wilson also serves to realistically allow dialogue to take place in a solitary scenario.

It is rumored, but not true, that one of the original volleyball props was sold at an auction for $18,500 to the ex-CEO of FedEx Office, Ken May. At the time of the film's release, Wilson launched its own joint promotion centered on its products "co-starring" with Tom Hanks. Wilson manufactured a volleyball with a reproduction of the bloodied handprint face on one side. It was sold for a limited time during the film's initial release and continues to be offered on the company's website. An original Wilson the volleyball prop sold via Heritage Auctions on December 7, 2024, for $162,500.

== Release ==
=== Theatrical ===
Cast Away was released theatrically in North America by 20th Century Fox on December 22, 2000, the same day as Nicolas Cage's The Family Man, Sandra Bullock's Miss Congeniality, Gerard Butler's Dracula 2000, William H. Macy's State and Main, Cate Blanchett's The Gift, George Clooney's O Brother Where Art Thou?, and Javier Bardem's Before Night Falls.

=== Home media ===
In North America (Region 1), Cast Away was released on VHS and DVD on June 12, 2001, by 20th Century Fox Home Entertainment. The DVD version of the film is a THX certified two-disc Special Edition release that features a DTS 6.1 ES audio track and several bonus features, including galleries, special effects vignettes, an audio commentary, trailers, TV spots, behind-the-scenes footage, interviews, featurettes, and more. Within its first week, it became the fastest-selling DVD release in 20th Century Fox history, selling 1.8 million copies and surpassing X-Men. Additionally, the film generated $5.5 million in rentals, which broke Traffic's record for having the highest first week DVD rentals. Cast Away went on to hold this record until 2002 when it was taken by The Fast and the Furious. In total, the film made $57 million in home video sales and $20.6 million in home video rentals during its first week of release. It had the third-highest first week home video rentals of any film, behind Meet the Parents and The Sixth Sense.

By the end of 2001, the film collected $97 million in North American home video sales, selling 4.4 million units. It also earned $93.6 million in home video rentals, making it the year's third-highest rentals, after Meet the Parents and What Women Want. For the VHS rentals, it ranked fourth with $74.9 million, only behind the latter two films and Miss Congeniality. The DVD rentals generated $18.7 million, once again ranking fourth, this time behind Meet the Parents, The Family Man, and Unbreakable.

In Region 2 and Region 4 areas such as Australia, the United Kingdom and Europe, the initial home video releases were handled by DreamWorks Home Entertainment rather than 20th Century Fox Home Entertainment. The international prints also featured the 1997 DreamWorks Pictures opening logo, while North American prints featured the 1994 20th Century Fox opening logo. In South Korea (Region 3), the film was released on DVD on April 20, 2002, by CJ Entertainment. CJ Entertainment had also handled the South Korean theatrical distribution for Cast Away and other DreamWorks films such as American Beauty and Gladiator.

In North America, a single-disc DVD version of the film was released alongside the Fox film Independence Day on May 21, 2002.

20th Century Fox Home Entertainment released the film on Blu-ray in North America on December 4, 2007.

==== Rights and streaming ====
In February 2006, Viacom (now known as Paramount Skydance) acquired the international rights to Cast Away, along with the rights to all other 58 live-action films DreamWorks had released since 1997, following its $1.6 billion acquisition of the company's live-action assets. During this period, DreamWorks' live-action studio functioned as a semi-autonomous label of Viacom's Paramount Pictures, with Paramount handling distribution for the studio's new releases. In March 2006, shortly after the acquisition, Viacom sold the DreamWorks live-action film library, including the international rights of Cast Away, to Soros Strategic Partners (led by investor George Soros) and Dune Capital Management. This was done to help Viacom finance the acquisition of DreamWorks' live-action studio, as the film library alone was valued at $900 million. Soros and his associates temporarily took a majority 51% ownership stake in the library, while Viacom retained a minority 49% stake, with Paramount Pictures being given exclusive distribution rights under a five-year agreement, which could renew if Soros continued to hold a majority stake in the assets. In 2008, DreamWorks separated from Viacom to become independent again, partnering with Reliance Anil Dhirubhai Ambani Group, but Paramount Pictures retained distribution rights to the live-action DreamWorks library, including Cast Away's international components, which was still technically controlled by Soros. In February 2010, Viacom exercised its option to buy back Soros's 51% stake in the library for $400 million, regaining full control over the assets. Paramount Pictures continues to hold the rights to the Soros/Dune-acquired films, including ongoing distribution. Paramount Home Entertainment did not release Cast Away on Blu-ray internationally until 2012, possibly due to complications with Soros and Fox. Prior to regaining full control of the DreamWorks library in 2010, Paramount had already released other live-action DreamWorks films on home video.

In March 2019, the film's domestic rights transferred to The Walt Disney Company, after Rupert Murdoch sold most of 21st Century Fox's film and television assets to Disney. The film has since been made available to stream on Paramount+ in international markets such as Scandinavia and the British Isles, and was also on the streaming service for the Paramount-owned Australian broadcaster Network 10. In North America, the film has not been made available on Disney+, instead streaming on Hulu (one of the additional assets Disney acquired from Fox in 2019).

In 2024, it was reported that Disney were preventing the release of 4K masters for Cast Away and other Fox catalog titles like Die Hard 2 and The French Connection. However, an international 4K release may still possibly occur through Paramount's joint ownership of the film.

== Reception ==
=== Box office ===
Cast Away opened in 2,774 theaters in North America and grossed $28.9 million (an average of $10,412 per theater) in its opening weekend. For the four-day Christmas long holiday weekend, it took in a total of $39.9 million. At that point, it had the highest Christmas opening weekend of any film, surpassing Patch Adams. Cast Away reached the number one spot at the box office upon opening, beating another Helen Hunt film, What Women Want, as well as The Family Man and Miss Congeniality. It would also compete against How the Grinch Stole Christmas, which was released the previous month. With a total gross of $8.5 million, Cast Away held the record for having the biggest New Year's Eve gross until Meet the Fockers took it in 2004. The film remained at the top of the box office for three weeks until it was overtaken by Save the Last Dance. By early February 2001, it crossed the $200 million mark, becoming the third film of 2000 to do so, after Mission: Impossible 2 and How the Grinch Stole Christmas.

Cast Away kept performing well and ended up earning $233.6 million domestically and $196 million internationally, for a total of $429.6 million, against its production budget of $90 million. It became the third-highest-grossing film of 2000, behind Mission: Impossible 2 and Gladiator.

=== Critical response ===
On Rotten Tomatoes, Cast Away holds an approval rating of 88% based on 156 reviews, with an average rating of 7.6/10. The site's critical consensus reads, "Flawed but fascinating, Cast Away offers an intelligent script, some of Robert Zemeckis' most mature directing, and a showcase performance from Tom Hanks." On Metacritic, the film has a weighted average score of 74 out of 100 based on reviews from 32 critics, indicating "generally favorable" reviews. Audiences polled by CinemaScore gave the film an average grade of "B" on an A+ to F scale.

Roger Ebert of the Chicago Sun-Times gave the film three stars out of four. In his review, he praised Hanks for doing "a superb job of carrying Cast Away all by himself for about two-thirds of its running time" by "never straining for effect, always persuasive even in this unlikely situation, winning our sympathy with his eyes and his body language when there's no one else on the screen." However, he also mentioned how he felt that the film is "a strong and simple story surrounded by needless complications, and flawed by a last act that disappoints us and then ends on a note of forced whimsy." Stephen Holden of The New York Times gave the film a four out of five scoring and said, "At its best, Cast Away, like Titanic, awes us with its sheer oceanic sweep and its cosmic apprehension of human insignificance."

In an article on its website, Rotten Tomatoes ranked Cast Away as the 23rd best film of 2000, based on its audience and critic scores. In 2024, CBR ranked it fifth on a list of the "10 Best Live-Action DreamWorks Movies of All Time". In 2025, it was one of the films voted for the "Readers' Choice" edition of The New York Times' list of "The 100 Best Movies of the 21st Century," finishing at number 291.

=== Accolades ===
Award	Category	Recipient(s)	Result	Ref.
Academy Awards	Best Actor	Tom Hanks	Nominated	
Academy Awards	Best Sound	Randy Thom, Tom Johnson, Dennis S. Sands and William B. Kaplan	Nominated	
American Cinema Editors Awards	Best Edited Feature Film – Dramatic	Arthur Schmidt	Nominated	
Boston Society of Film Critics Awards	Best Actor	Tom Hanks	Nominated	3rd place
ASCAP Award	Top Box Office Films	Alan Silvestri (also for What Lies Beneath and What Women Want)	Won	
BAFTA Awards	Best Film Actor in a Leading Role	Tom Hanks	Nominated	
Critics' Choice Awards	Best Inanimate Object	Wilson	Won	
Critics' Choice Awards	Best Picture		Nominated	
Chicago Film Critics Association Awards	Best Actor	Tom Hanks	Won	
Chicago Film Critics Association Awards	Best Cinematography	Don Burgess	Nominated	
Chicago Film Critics Association Awards	Best Director	Robert Zemeckis	Nominated	
Cinema Audio Society Awards	Outstanding Achievement in Sound Mixing for a Feature Film	Randy Thom, Tom Johnson, Dennis S. Sands and William B. Kaplan	Nominated	
Dallas-Fort Worth Film Critics Association Awards	Best Actor	Tom Hanks	Nominated	3rd place
Golden Globe Awards	Best Actor in a Motion Picture – Drama	Tom Hanks	Won	
Grammy Awards	Best Instrumental Composition	Alan Silvestri (for "Cast Away End Credits")	Won	
Las Vegas Film Critics Society Awards	Best Actor	Tom Hanks	Nominated	
Las Vegas Film Critics Society Awards	Best Cinematography	Don Burgess	Nominated	
Las Vegas Film Critics Society Awards	Best Director	Robert Zemeckis	Nominated	
Las Vegas Film Critics Society Awards	Best Visual Effects	John Frazier and Ken Ralston	Nominated	
MTV Movie Awards	Best Action Sequence in a Movie	Plane crash	Nominated	
MTV Movie Awards	Best Kiss in a Movie	Tom Hanks and Helen Hunt	Nominated	
MTV Movie Awards	Best On-Screen Duo or Team in a Movie	Tom Hanks and Wilson	Nominated	
MTV Movie Awards	Best Performance in a Movie	Tom Hanks	Nominated	
Screen Actors Guild Awards	Outstanding Performance by a Male Actor in a Leading Role in a Motion Picture	Tom Hanks	Nominated	

== In popular culture ==
A 2002 FedEx commercial aired during Super Bowl XXXVII parodied the final scene of the film, in which a character similar to Noland returns a package to its sender after being stranded with it for five years. The survivor curiously asks the woman living in a suburban house what was in the box, to which the woman replies, "Just a satellite phone, GPS locator, fishing rod, water purifier, and some seeds. Just silly stuff," all items that would have alleviated or ended his situation quickly. This commercial inspired one of the main plot points in "Mr. Monk and the End", the 2009 series finale of the television series Monk.

Media executive Lloyd Braun of ABC first suggested the idea of a Cast Away–type television series at a dinner party in 2003. Thom Sherman later pitched the idea for Cast Away – The Series, but never developed the idea. The concept was later developed and pitched with the title Nowhere, which later turned into the ABC show Lost.

The second episode of the seventh season of It's Always Sunny in Philadelphia, "The Gang Goes to the Jersey Shore", refers to a Cast Away scene. When Frank loses his "rum ham" while floating on a raft in the Atlantic Ocean, his anguish resembles that of Tom Hanks' character losing Wilson the volleyball.

On December 31, 2002, at Madison Square Garden, Phish played a clip from the film on the jumbotron to introduce their song "Wilson" during their concert. They later introduced "Tom Hanks" during the song onstage, but it was later revealed to be keyboardist Page McConnell's brother Steve.

On April 15, 2022, at Progressive Field, Tom Hanks threw the ceremonial first pitch at the Cleveland Guardians home opener, accompanied by a replica of Wilson from the movie.

Dale Earnhardt Jr. raced with a Wilson replica in his car to two victories in fall 2001 at Dover and Talladega. This was due to a joke on the radio that he felt lonely in the car during a race.

In a 2001 episode of The King of Queens, Doug Heffernan (Kevin James) is interviewed for a job at FedEx. He references Cast Away when he sees a model of a FedEx plane on his interviewer's desk and jokingly imitates the crash scene.

In the 2005 animated film Madagascar, Alex the Lion (Ben Stiller) reacts to being stranded on the titular island in a similar way to Chuck, including talking to an inanimate basketball that he refers to as "Spalding."

In the 2011 animated film Alvin and the Chipmunks: Chipwrecked, the Chipmunks become stranded on a tropical island and encounter Zoe Cooper (Jenny Slate), the sole inhabitant of the island for several years, who introduces the Chipmunks to her "friends" Rawling (baseball), Spalding (basketball), Callaway (golf ball), Dunlop (tennis ball), and Nerf (football) whom she interacts with over the course of the movie.

The 2023 South Korean television series Castaway Diva was directly inspired by Cast Away's plot, as evidenced by the series title and protagonist Seo Mok-ha's shared experiences being stranded on an uninhabited, deserted island off the coast of South Korea. Additionally, the series explores similar themes, including isolation, perseverance, adaptability to change, and the necessity of meaningful social connection, while simultaneously addressing physiological, social, and psychological considerations and effects that were left ambiguous in the source material.
