= Eori =

Island of the Mamanuca Islands, Fiji

- Interactive map of Eori

Geography
- Location: South Pacific
- Coordinates: 17.4380828°S 177.060535°E
- Archipelago: Mamanuca Islands
- Area: 0.245 km^{2} (0.095 sq mi)
- Highest elevation: 64 m (210 ft)

Administration
- Fiji
- Division: Western
- Province: Nadroga-Navosa Province

Demographics
- Population: unknown

Eori is a privately held island, which lies at the extreme northwestern end of the Mamanuca Islands group. It is located north of Navadra.

== Geography ==
It has an area of 9.7 hectares (24 acres) and was advertised as being for lease in April 2008 with a price of €9,000,000. In 2009 it was offered at auction but failed to sell at a top bid of A$1 million.

== Ownership ==
Eori was for many years owned by real estate firm Pacific Islands Partnership Limited, which is in turn solely owned by Tim Manning's Chaylor Investments. Chaylor investor Eric Rush held a 7 percent share in Eori specifically.

In 2009, Manning and Chaylor sold the island to investor Graeme Hart., who controls the island through a 100% interest in LLC Eori Island Limited via his personal investment corporation, Rank Group Ltd.

== See also ==
- Desert island
- List of islands of Fiji
