= South Sea Island =

Island of the Mamanuca Islands, Fiji

Native name: Vunavadra, Vunavadra
- Interactive map of South Sea Island

Geography
- Location: South Pacific
- Coordinates: 17.636497°S 177.18161°E
- Archipelago: Mamanuca Islands
- Area: 0.018 km^{2} (0.0069 sq mi)
- Highest elevation: 3 m (10 ft)

Administration
- Fiji
- Division: Western
- Province: Ba Province
- District: Vuda

Demographics
- Population: 0

Additional information
- Official website: Official

South Sea Island (also known as Vunivandra or Vunivadra) is a tiny island within the Mamanuca Islands of Fiji in the South Pacific. The islands are a part of the Fiji's Western Division.

== Geography ==
Vunivadra is a low reef island, one of the smallest among the Mamanuca group. It is located south of Kadavulailai and home to a private resort.
