= Yanuya =

Island within the Mamanuca Islands of Fiji

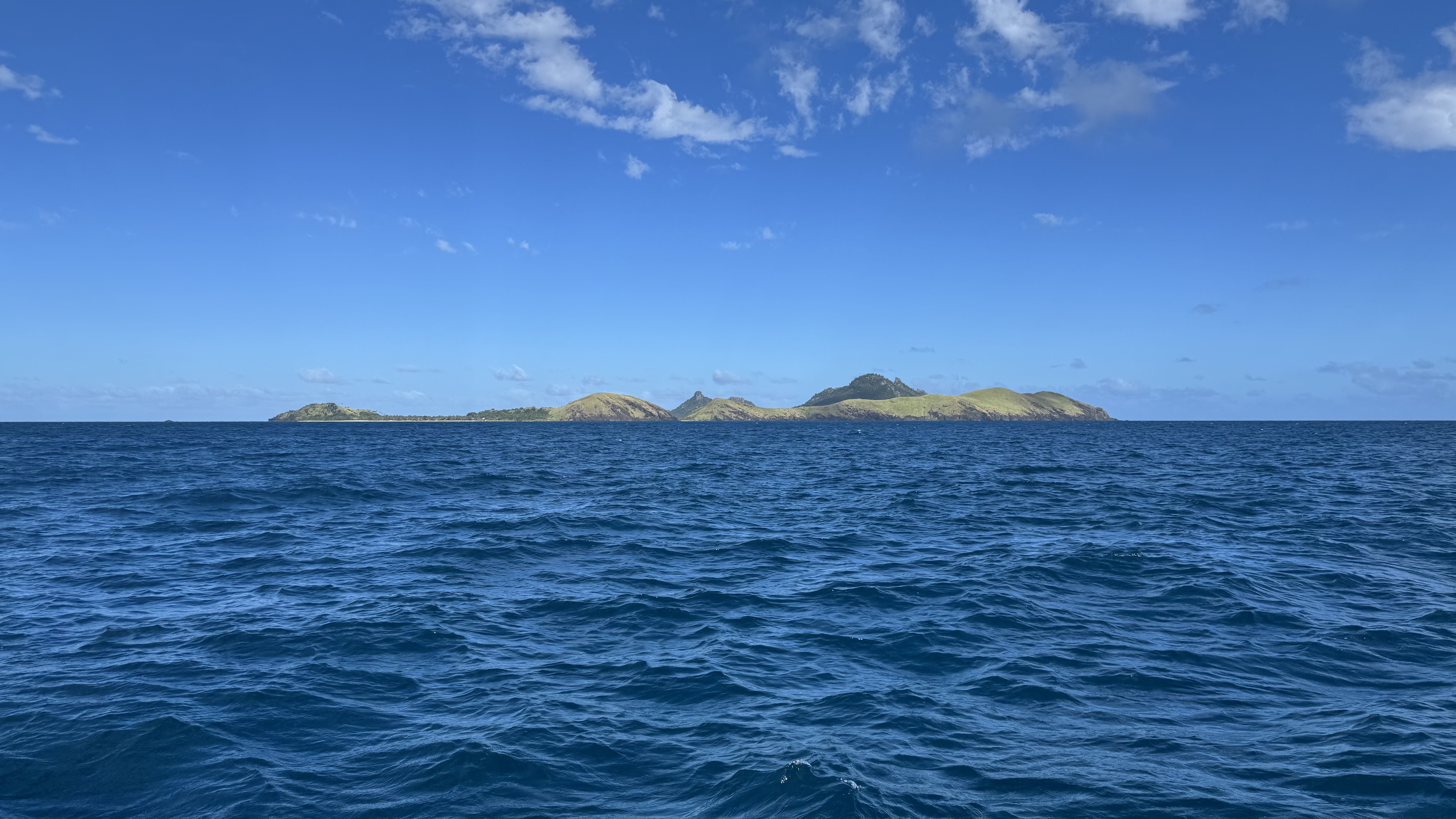
- Yanuya from Tokoriki in June 2026
- Interactive map of Yanuya

Geography
- Location: South Pacific
- Coordinates: 17.5960724°S 177.0577188°E
- Archipelago: Mamanuca Islands
- Area: 1.65 km^{2} (0.64 sq mi)
- Highest elevation: 104 m (341 ft)

Administration
- Fiji
- Division: Western
- Province: Nadroga-Navosa Province
- District: Malolo

Demographics
- Population: unknown

Yanuya is an island within the Mamanuca Islands of Fiji in the South Pacific. The island is located east of Monu, west of Tokoriki and northwest of Tavua Island.

== History ==
The majority of the Mamanuca islands were never inhabited because of the intense sun and lack of fresh water. Just three of the large volcanic islands—Malolo, Yanuya, and Tavua—were able to provide enough support for fishing villages. The village in Yanuya is known for pottery making.

== Cruising ==
Yachts that wish to visit the Monoriki Island, where the Tom Hanks movie Castaway was filmed, must first make a visit to the chief at Yanuya for sevu sevu. There are moorings at Yanuya and in addition to the traditional kava root offering, cruisers must also pay $20FJD for landing at Monoriki. This must be done before going to the other island.
