= Mana Island Airport =

Airport in Fiji

- IATA: MNF; ICAO: NFMA

Summary
- Airport type: Public
- Serves: Mana Island, Fiji
- Coordinates: 17°40′23″S 177°05′54″E

Map
- Location of airport in Fiji

Mana Island Airport (IATA: MNF, ICAO: NFMA) is an airport serving Mana Island, one of the Mamanuca Islands in Fiji.

== Airlines and destinations ==
Following the closure of Pacific Island Air in January 2025, the airport no longer has regularly scheduled passenger flights.
