= Tavua Island =

Island in Fiji

- Interactive map of Tavua Island

Geography
- Location: South Pacific
- Coordinates: 17.6178079°S 177.0866925°E
- Archipelago: Mamanuca Islands

Administration
- Fiji
- Division: Western
- Province: Nadroga-Navosa Province
- District: Malolo

Demographics
- Population: unknown

Tavua Island is an island of the Mamanuca Islands, Fiji. It is located south of Tokoriki and Yanuya and northeast of Matamanoa.

Tavua was used as a tribe name in Survivor: Game Changers.

== See also ==
- List of islands
