= Malolo Lailai Airport =

Airport in Fiji

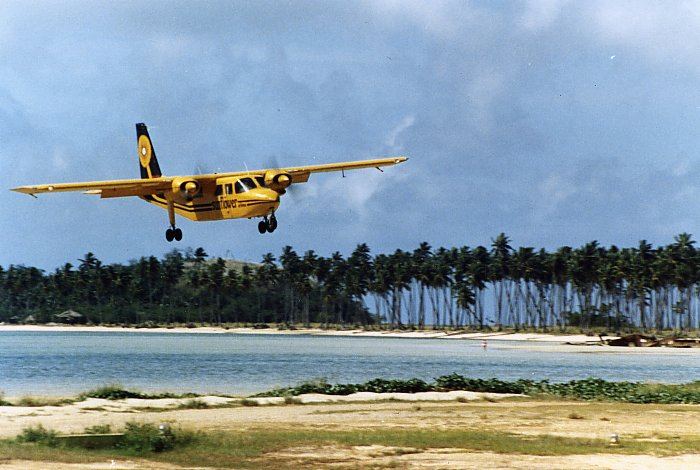
- IATA: PTF; ICAO: NFFO

Summary
- Airport type: Public
- Serves: Malolo Lailai, Western Division, Fiji
- Elevation AMSL: 3 m (9.8 ft)
- Coordinates: 17°46′59″S 177°12′59″E

Map
- Location of the airport in Fiji

Runways
Direction	Length		Surface
Direction	m	ft	Surface
03/21	640	2,100	Dirt
- Sources: WAD, GCM, ASN STV

Malolo Lailai Airport (IATA: PTF, ICAO: NFFO) is an airport on the Malolo Lailai island in the Fijian Western Division. The airport is a short strip running the width of the island, and is mainly used for general aviation and transporting guests to resorts on the island, such as Musket Cove Resort, Lomani Island Resort and Plantation Island Resort.

== Airlines and destinations ==
Pacific Island Air connects Malolo Lailai Airport to Nadi International Airport.
