= Denarau Island =

Private Resort Development in Fiji

Coordinates: 17.773°S 177.373°E

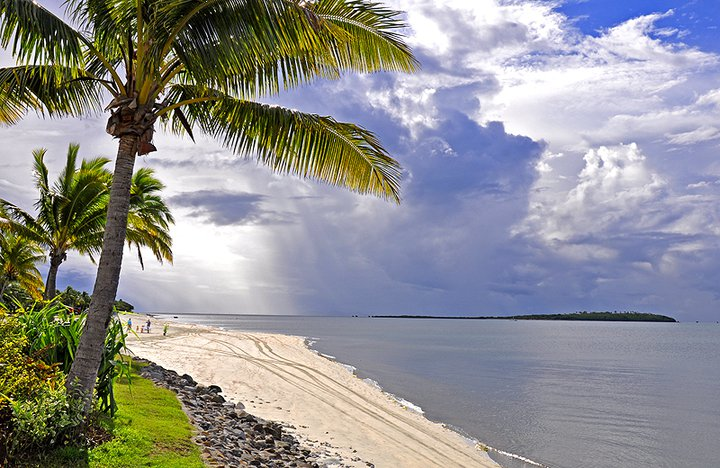
- Denarau Island
- Interactive map of Denarau Island

Geography
- Location: South Pacific
- Area: 2.55 km^{2} (0.98 sq mi)

Administration
- Fiji
- Division: Western
- Province: Ba Province
- Tikina: Vuda

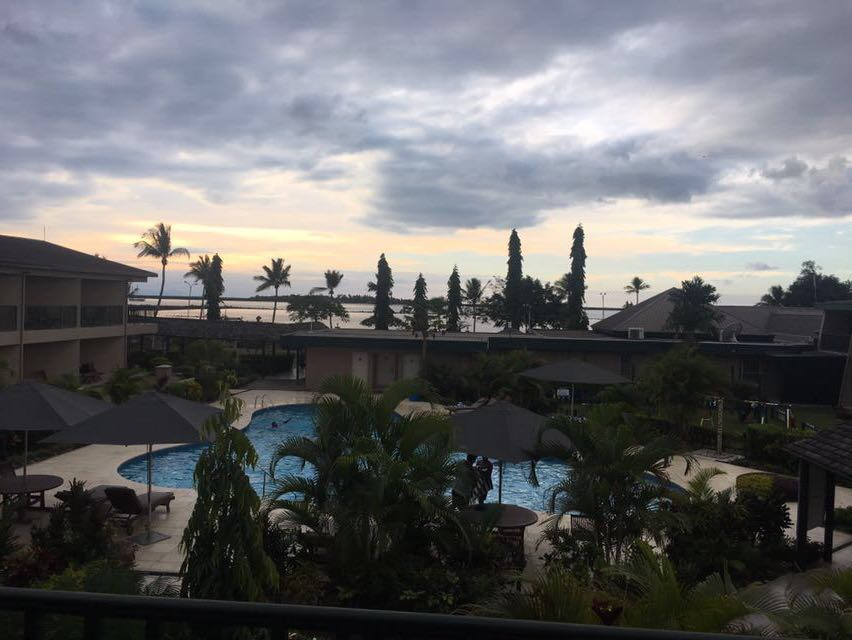
Sunset at Denarau Island

Denarau Island (Fijian pronunciation: [ndenarɔu̯]) is a small private resort development on the western side of Viti Levu in the Republic of Fiji. The 2.55 km^{2} resort is reached via a short causeway over a creek and is located 5 km north west of the town Nadi and 10 km west of Nadi International Airport.

Denarau is known for its hotels and resorts, with the 18-hole Denarau Golf course as its centrepiece. The development includes international chains such as Hilton, Sheraton, Radisson, Westin, Sofitel and Wyndham (formerly Worldmark).

Denarau Marina is located in Denarau Island and provides sea transfer services to the island chains of the Mamanucas and the Yasawas.

Port Denarau, as well as containing Denarau Marina, is a shopping precinct with a variety of restaurants, a supermarket, bakery, hairdressers and tour operators.

== History ==
The development of Denarau Island started in 1969, when American developer Dennis McElrath purchased the land. The first hotel, the Regent of Fiji (now the Westin Denarau) opened in 1975. Between 1988 and 1991, Japanese property developer EIE International purchased all of Denarau in stages and started on a $200 million development project, bulldozing 850 acres of mangrove forest and building an 18-hole golf course, a marina and more hotels. After EIE went bankrupt in 1995, the resort was purchased by a consortium of Tabua Investments of New Zealand, ITT Sheraton and Air Pacific.
