= Treasure Island (Fiji) =

Island of the Mamanuca Islands, Fiji

Native name: Lovuka, Eluvuka, Elevuka
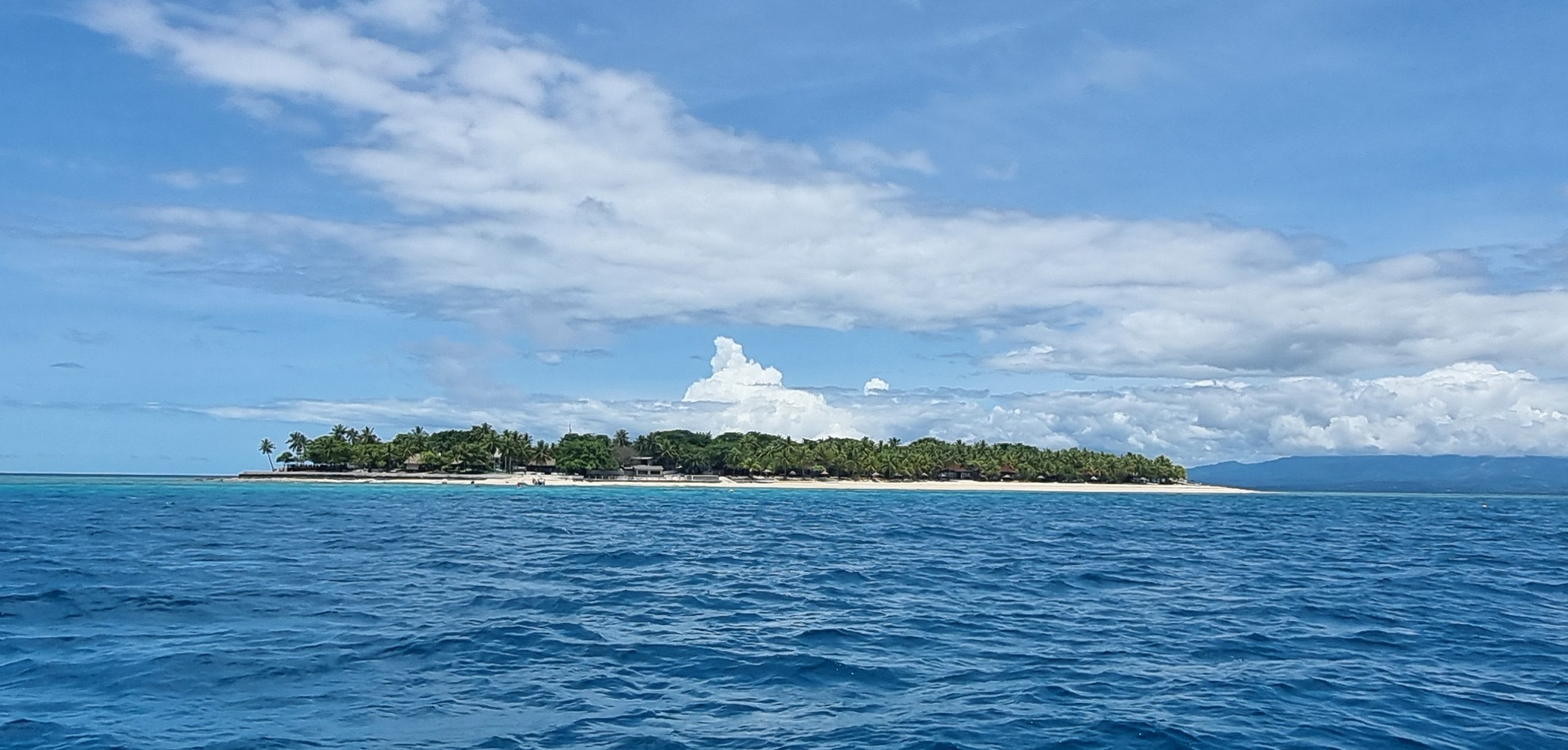
- Treasure Island pictured in 2026.
- Interactive map of Treasure Island

Geography
- Location: South Pacific
- Coordinates: 17.6540329°S 177.2639903°E
- Archipelago: Mamanuca Islands
- Area: 0.18 km^{2} (0.069 sq mi)
- Highest elevation: 3 m (10 ft)

Administration
- Fiji
- Division: Western
- Province: Ba Province
- Tikina: Vuda

Treasure Island (also known as Lovuka or Elovuka) is a small island within the Mamanuca Islands of Fiji in the South Pacific. The islands are a part of the Fiji's Western Division.

== Geography ==
Treasure Island is a low reef island, located east of Beachcomber Island. It is home to a private resort. Treasure Island is close to Nukasiga Sand Bar.
