= Mamanuca Islands =

Volcanic archipelago in Fiji

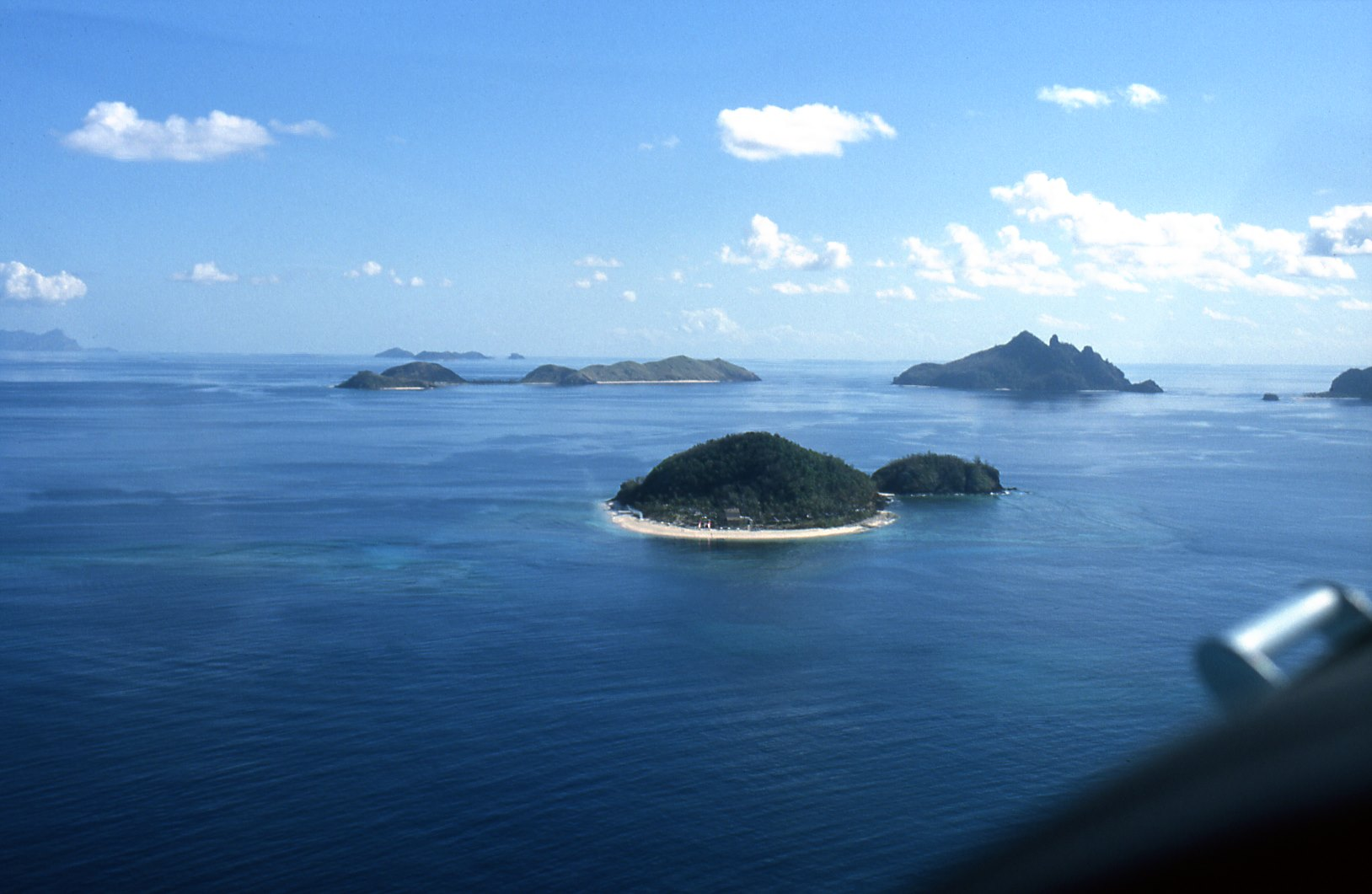
- Mamanuca Islands from the air

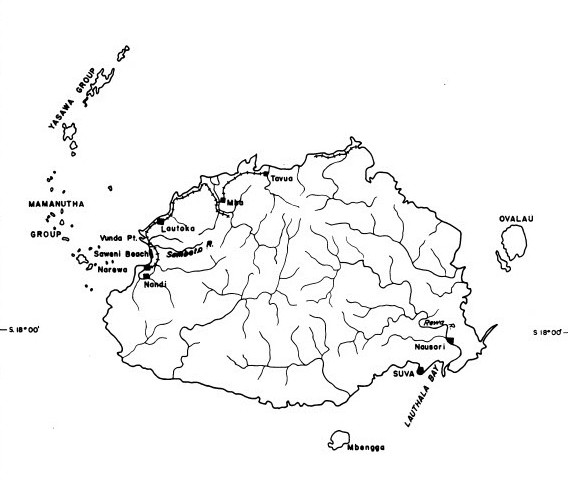
- Map of Viti Levu with the Mamanuca Islands labelled as Mamanutha Group on the left

Geography
- Location: South Pacific Ocean
- Coordinates: 17°40′S 177°05′E
- Total islands: c. 28
- Major islands: Matamanoa, Mana, Malolo

Administration
- Fiji

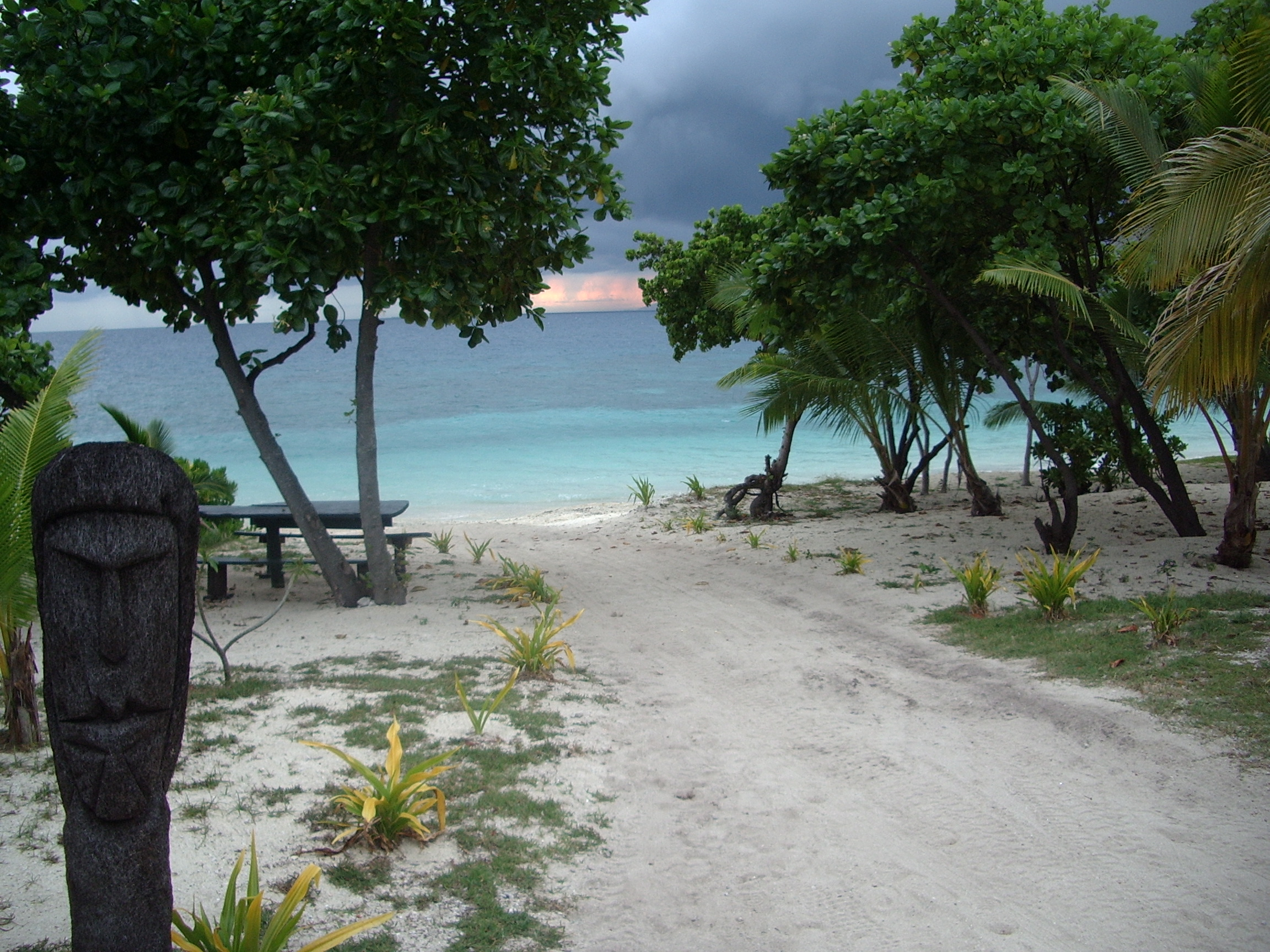
Bounty Island

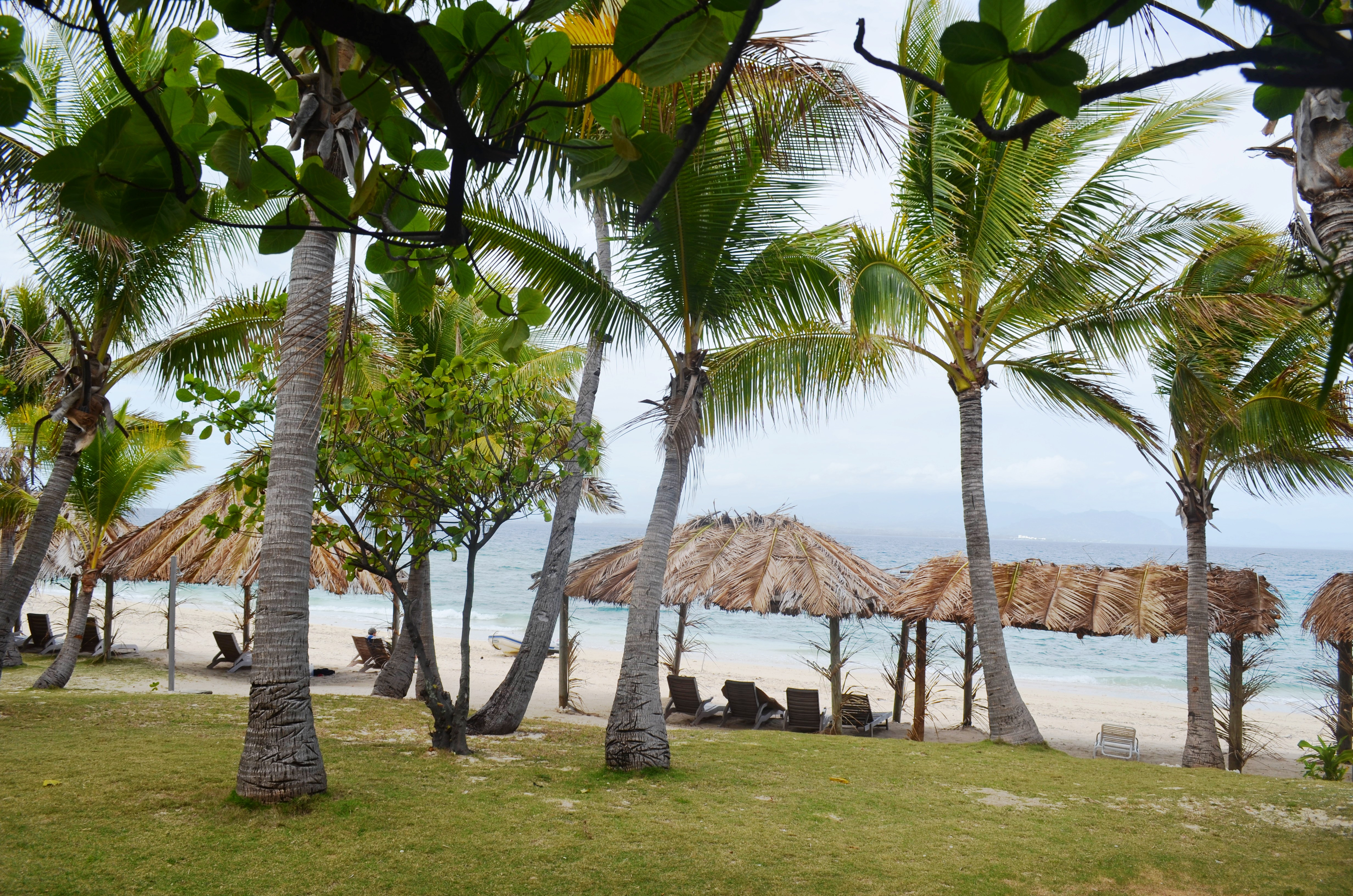
Beach on Kadavulailai (Bounty Island)

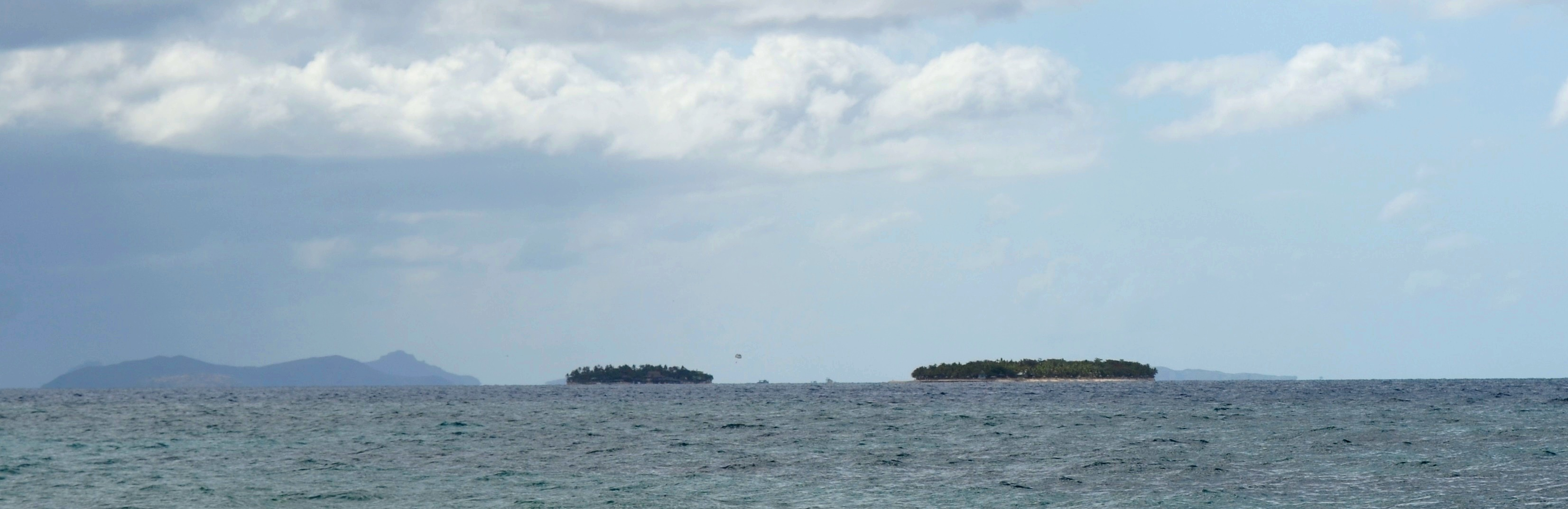
From left to right - Mana Island, Beachcomber Island, Treasure Island and Tokoriki Island (behind Treasure Island)

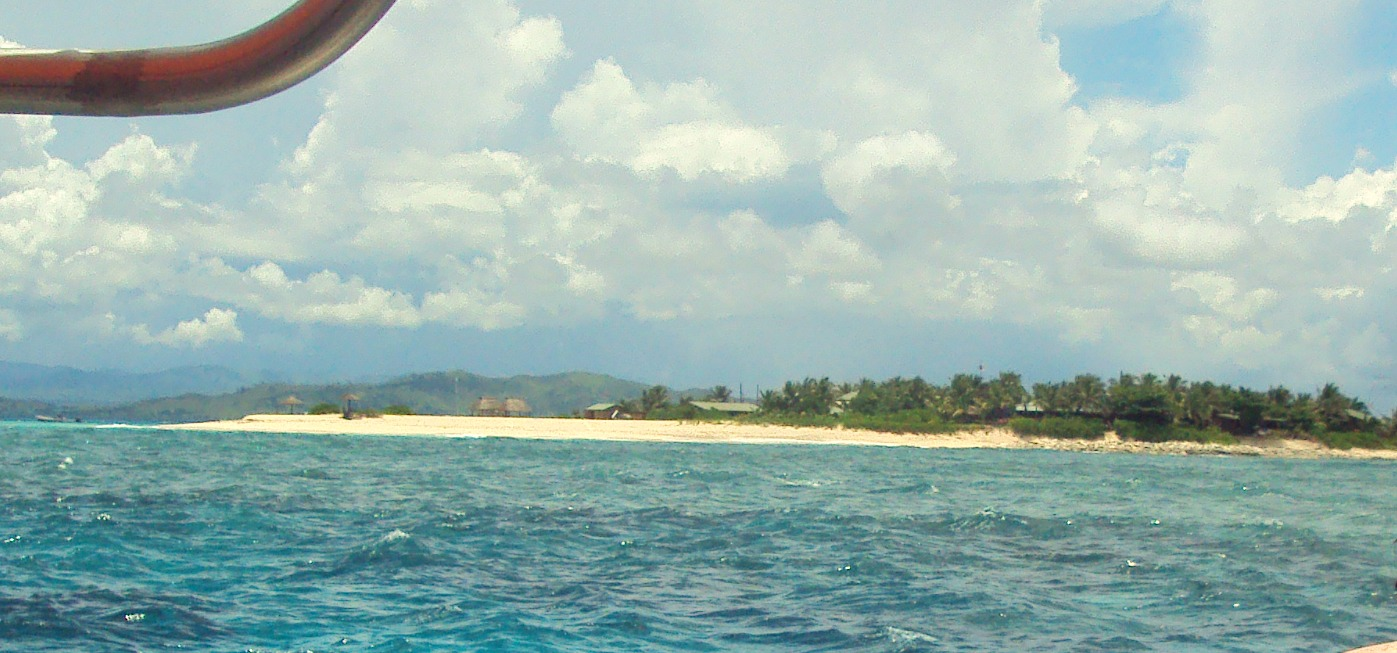
Tivua Island

The Mamanuca Islands (Fijian: [mamaˈnuða]) of Fiji are a volcanic archipelago lying to the west of Nadi and to the south of the Yasawa Islands. The group, a popular tourist destination, consists of about 20 islands, but about seven of these are covered by the Pacific Ocean at high tide.

The islands offer crystal clear waters, palm fringed sandy beaches and live coral reefs. There are islands, villages, resorts to visit, snorkel and swim.

The coastal/marine ecosystem and recreation value of the archipelago contribute to its national significance as outlined in Fiji's Biodiversity Strategy and Action Plan.

Since 2016, the islands have been the filming location of the television series Survivor. One of the islands, Monuriki, was made famous as the anonymous island that featured in the 2000 Robert Zemeckis film Cast Away, starring Tom Hanks.

== Islands ==
Politically, the islands are a part of the Nadroga-Navosa Province, which is itself a part of the Fiji's Western Division.

Islands in the Mamanuca chain, not all of which are inhabited, include:

- Beachcomber
- Eori
- Kadavulailai (aka Bounty)
- Kadomo
- Malamala
- Malolo
- Malololailai
- Mana
- Manu
- Matamanoa
- Modriki
- Monu
- Monuriki
- Namotu
- Nautanivono (Yadua)
- Navadra
- Navini
- Qalito (Castaway)
- South Sea
- Tavarua
- Tavua
- Tivua
- Tokoriki
- Treasure
- Vomo
- Vomolailai
- Wadigi
- Yanuya

== Activities ==
Port Denarau is the gateway to the Mamanuca and Yasawa islands. One may take day trips from Denarau to the Mamanuca Islands or find a resort to stay overnight. The resorts located in the Mamanucas run the gamut from high-end luxury accommodations to less expensive options targeted towards backpackers and budget-conscious travelers.

Activities in the Mamanucas include sailing, swimming, snorkelling, kayaking, semi-submersible coral viewing, diving, swimming with reef sharks, windsurfing, hiking, visiting villages, mini golf and discovering secluded beaches.

== Survivor ==
The American edition of Survivor has used the islands as the location for filming, beginning with its 33rd season (Survivor: Millennials vs. Gen X) in April 2016. Typically, two seasons of the show will be filmed back to back between March and June of a given year, with the first season airing in the fall of that year, and the second airing in the spring of the following year. This marks the longest consecutive period that Survivor has filmed in one location. (The show had previously filmed its fourteenth season, Survivor: Fiji, in the Macuata Province.)

Before the airing of the 35th season (Survivor: Heroes vs. Healers vs. Hustlers), host Jeff Probst said in an interview with Entertainment Weekly that the Mamanuca Islands is the optimal location for the show and he would like to stay there permanently.

The following seasons have filmed in the Mamanuca Islands:

- Survivor: Millennials vs. Gen X
- Survivor: Game Changers
- Survivor: Heroes vs. Healers vs. Hustlers
- Survivor: Ghost Island
- Survivor: David vs. Goliath
- Survivor: Edge of Extinction
- Survivor: Island of the Idols
- Survivor: Winners at War
- Survivor 41
- Survivor 42
- Survivor 43
- Survivor 44
- Survivor 45
- Survivor 46
- Survivor 47
- Survivor 48
- Survivor 49
- Survivor 50: In the Hands of the Fans
- Survivor 51

== See also ==
- List of islands
