= Malolo =

- Island and Tikina
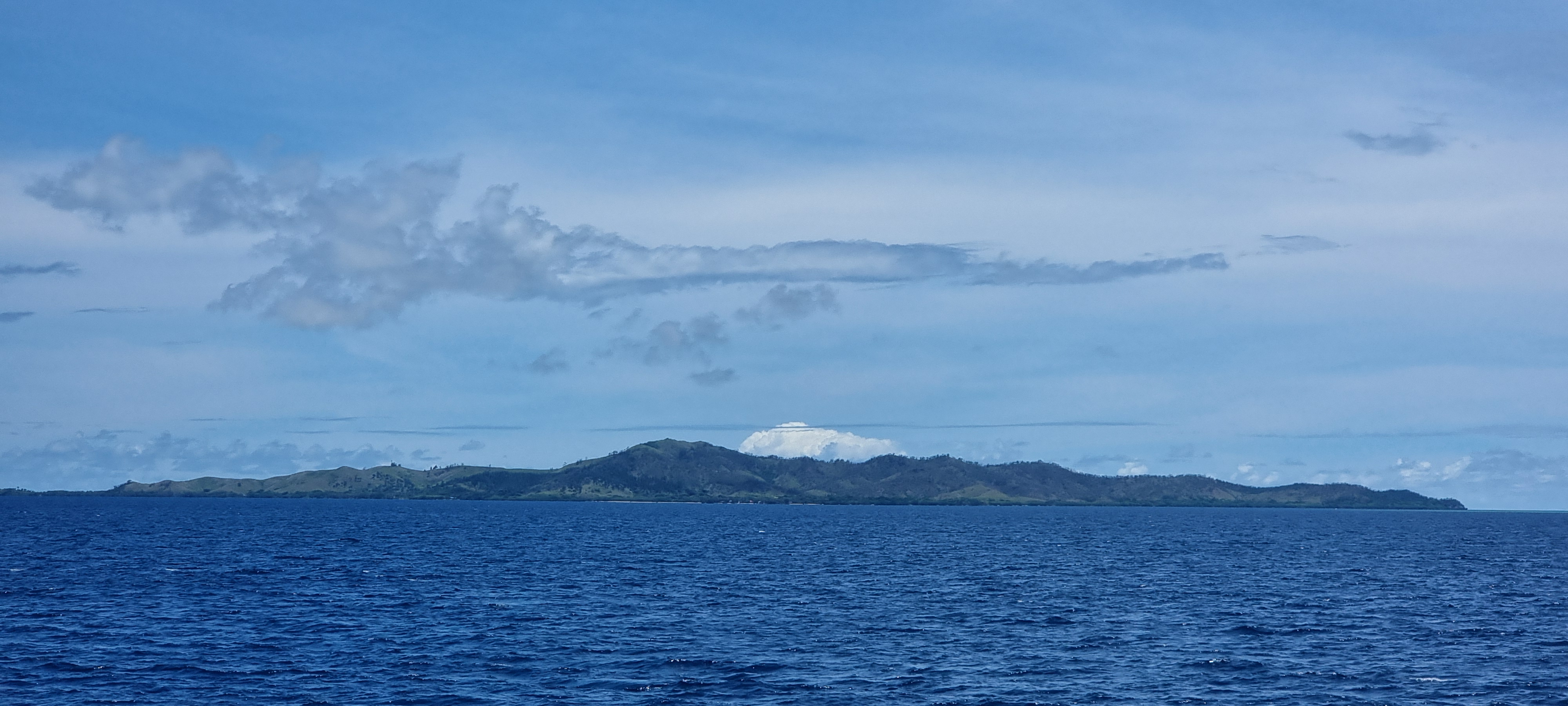
- Malolo Island pictured in 2026.

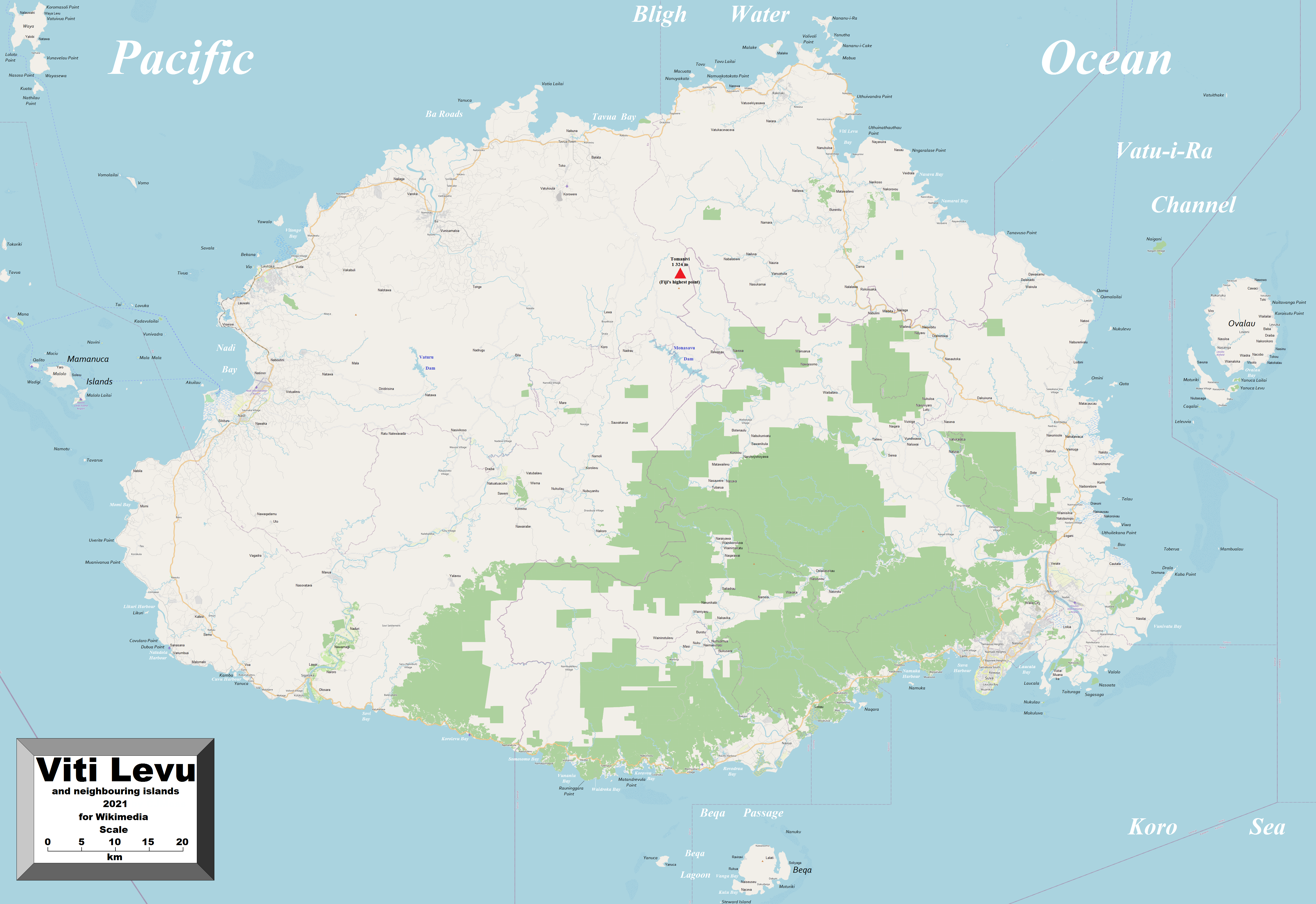
- Viti Levu with Malolo off the west coast

- Location in Fiji
- Coordinates: 17°44′58″S 177°10′10″E
- Country: Fiji
- Archipelago: Mamanuca
- Division: Western Division
- Province: Nadroga-Navosa
- Time zone: UTC+12

Malolo is a volcanic island in the Pacific Ocean, near Fiji as wel as a tikina (district) of Nadroga-Navosa Province. Malolo was used as a tribe name in Survivor: Ghost Island. Malolo Island is the largest of the Mamanuca Islands and is home to two villages.

== History ==
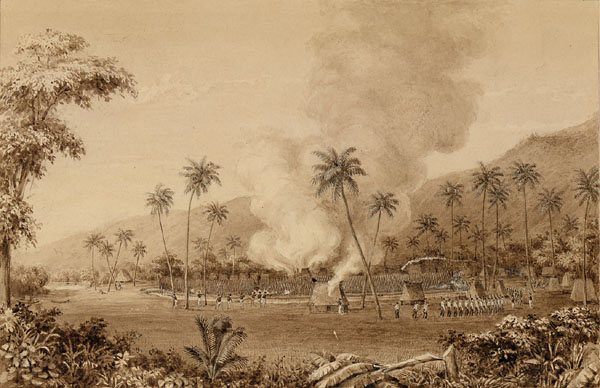
Retaliation taken against Malolo during the United States Exploring Expedition, drawn by Alfred Thomas Agate

Malolo was one of the locations surveyed by members the United States Exploring Expedition under Charles Wilkes in 1840. During their visit, two members of the party, including Midshipman Wilkes Henry, Wilkes' nephew, were killed by natives as they attempted to negotiate for food. In retaliation, 80 plus crewmen from the Expedition's ships attacked and destroyed the villages on Malolo, killing 87, and laid waste to all of the crops.

== Tourism ==
Malolo Island is home to five resorts: Tropica Island Resort, Malolo Island Resort, Likuliku Island Resort, 6 Senses Resort and Spa, and Funky Fish Resort.

== Access ==
Malolo Island is accessible by boat South Sea Cruises / helicopters for the resorts that have Helipads or through the nearby Malolo Lailai Airport.
