= Western Division, Fiji =

Division of Fiji

Coordinates: 18°00′S 177°30′E

Western Division पश्चिमी प्रभाग (Fiji Hindi)
- Division
- Map of Fiji showing Western division.
- Country: Fiji
- Capital: Lautoka

Area
  - Total: 6,360 km^{2} (2,460 sq mi)

Population (2017)
  - Total: 337,071
  - Density: 53.0/km^{2} (137/sq mi)

The Western Division is one of Fiji's four divisions. It consists of three provinces in western and northern Viti Levu, namely Ba Province, Nadroga-Navosa Province, and Ra Province. The largest city and capital is Lautoka.

It also includes a few outlying islands, including the Yasawa Islands, Viwa Island, and Mamanuca Islands. It has a land border with the Central Division on Viti Levu, and sea borders with the Northern Division and Eastern Division.
