= Culture of Fiji =

The culture of modern-day Fiji is a blend of indigenous Fijian, Indian, European, Chinese cultures.

Fiji had influence from various other cultures from the Pacific neighbors of Fiji; in particular the Tongan and Rotuman cultures.

== Tradition and hierarchy ==
Fijian indigenous society is very communal, with great importance attached to the family unit, the village, and the vanua (land). A hierarchy of chiefs presides over villages, clans, and tribes. Chiefly positions are hereditary; a deceased chief is invariably followed by a kinsman or kinswoman, though not necessarily his own son or daughter. This reflects Polynesian influence: in most other Melanesian societies, chiefs are appointed on merit.

The largest social unit for Fijians is the Yavusa, defined by R.A. Derrick as the "direct agnate descendants of a single kalou-vu" (deified ancestor). Chiefly succession was from older brother/sister to younger brother/sister, after the death of their father/mother. When the youngest brother/sister died, the eldest son/daughter of the eldest brother/sister became chief. This tradition still influences Fijian society today, though less rigidly: there is more of a tendency nowadays towards primogeniture.

Each brother/sister in the family then formed his own branch of the yavusa, called the Mataqali. Each mataqali became the custodian of a specific task. A fully developed Yavusa has several mataqali:

- Turaga: This mataqali descends from the original ancestor through primogeniture - inheritance of the eldest son in each succeeding generation. The chief of a village is always chosen from the Turaga mataqali.
- Sau turaga: These are next in rank to the chiefs, support him, and enforce his commands and also have final say in the installation of a Chief. The sau-turaga clan is often one and the same with that of the turaga as they can be considered one family unit.
- Mata ni vanua: These form the official heralds of the village. They are also in charge of ceremonial functions.
- Bete: This was the traditional priestly class. The kalou-vu was believed to speak through the Bete. This is why they are also considered "oracle priests".
- Bati: This mataqali forms the traditional warrior class.
- Dau (skill) and Matai: these are the crafts people and specialized skilled people of the tribe e.g. Dau ni vucu (Poet/choreographer/composer), Dau ni yau (treasurer), Mataisau (carpenter/or Canoe builder)

The mataqali are subdivided into Tokatoka, each comprising closely related families.

Several mataqali comprise a village, several of which form a yavusa or district. The British colonial rulers amalgamated the districts into Yasana, or Provinces. The districts also form three Matanitu, or Confederacies. These are often said to be agglomerations of provinces, but as the latter were a colonial imposition, the boundaries do not coincide exactly, and the provinces of Tailevu, Ra, Naitasiri, Lomaiviti and parts of Yasawa and Ba make up the Kubuna Confederacy. This Confederacy in modern Fiji is considered to be the most senior. The other two are Burebasaga (covering the rest of Viti Levu), and Tovata, covering Vanua Levu, Lau archipelago and Rotuma. Despite its isolation and relatively small size, Tovata has been politically dominant since Fiji gained its independence in 1970.

== Language ==
English, Fijian (based on the speech of Bau Island), and Hindustani are the official languages of Fiji. The Fijian language has many dialects, and there is a clear distinction between the dialects of the West, Central and Eastern parts of the country.

Other languages spoken in the country are Fiji Hindi, Cantonese, Rotuman, Gilbertese (Rabi Island), and Tuvaluan (Kioa Island). The Fiji Islands are traditionally linked to their island neighbours Rotuma, Tonga and Samoa, and this is evident in the culture and dialects of the Northern and Eastern provinces being Cakaudrove, Bua, Macuata, and Lau. The many dialects spoken in these four provinces consistently use sounds that are heard in Tongan and Samoan, but not so with dialects from the Western and South Western parts of Fiji. The Fijian language uses a Latin alphabet. However, the Fijian alphabet is dissimilar from the English alphabet. The following conventions exist:

- The letter "c" is pronounced like the English "th" sound in then. Laucala Bay is pronounced as 'Lauthala' Bay.
- The letter "d" is pronounced like English "nd". Nadi (the airport town) is pronounced 'Nandi'.
- The letter "b" is pronounced like English "mb" in bombast. The town of Ba is pronounced 'mBa'.
- The letter "q" is pronounced like the "ng" in the English word "finger". Beqa is pronounced mBengga.
- The letter "g" is pronounced like the "ng" in the English word "sing".
- The letter "r" is rolled as in Spanish.

In Fijian words, each vowel is given its full weight and never shortened, skipped or slurred.

=== Fiji English ===
The existence of many dialects within the Fijian language as well as exposure to the other languages spoken has contributed to many Fiji Islanders being bilingual. For general communication in an informal environment, a cross use of the languages has developed, resulting in slang now commonly referred to as Fiji English, although in formal settings, correct usage is adhered to. Fiji English comprises aspects of Fijian, English and Hindi, which reflects the history and identity of the people of Fiji.

Fiji English is non-rhotic.

The vowel sounds for Fiji English are:

| Keyword | Phoneme | Transcription |
|---|---|---|
| kit | /ɪ/ | [kɪt] |
| dress | /ɛ/ | [dɹɛs] |
| trap | /æ/ | [tɹæp] |
| lot | /ɔ/ | [lɔt] |
| strut | /ʌ/ or /ɐ/ | [stɹʌt] or [stɹɐt] |
| foot | /ʊ/ | [fʊt] |
| fleece | /i/ | [flis] |
| face | /eː/ | [feːs] |
| palm | /aː/ | [paːm] |
| thought | /ɔ/ | [t̪ɔt] or [θɔt] |
| goat | /oː/ | [goːt] |
| near | /iə/ or /ɪə/ | [niə] or [nɪə] |
| square | /ɛə/ | [skɛə] |
| start | /ɑː/ | [stɑːt] |
| force | /oː/ | [foːs] |
| cure | /joə/ | [kjoə] |
| bath | /a/ | [baθ] or [bɑt̪] |
| nurse | /əː/ or /ɐː/ | [nəːs] or [nɐːs] |
| goose | /u/ | [gus] |
| price | /ɐe/ | [pɹɐes] |
| choice | /ɔɪ/ | [tʃɔɪs] |
| mouth | /aɔ/ | [maɔt̪] or [maɔθ] |
| happy | /i/ | [hɑ.pi] |
| letter | /ɐ/ or /a/ | [lɛt.a] or [lɛt.ɐ] |
| horses | /ɪ/ | [hoːsɪz] |
| comma | /a/ or /ɐ/ | [kom.a] or [kom.ɐ] |

Fiji English recordings can be found here.

== Cultural arts and social polity ==
In culture, its various crafts and music give it an identity along with its traditional etiquette and varying forms of clothing attire, its unique architecture also tells a story of a culture and its evolution, the following will discuss these aspects of culture in Fiji.

=== Arts and crafts ===
Fiji's arts and crafts reflect local adaptations of their Polynesian and Melanesian heritage. By tradition, the men's and women's crafts are separate.

==== Women's crafts ====
The village of Na lotu on Kadavu Island is famous for its pottery, the making of which is still governed by strict rituals. Nadroga and Rewa also produce fine pottery. Each region has its own unique style in the making of pottery. The making of Tapa cloth, or (masi), is another craft associated with women. Tapa is made from the bark of the paper mulberry tree and decorated in charcoal with symbolic motifs and various patterns. In modern times, it has become fashionable for a masi to bear the name of the person who made it. Masi are often exchanged as gifts on formal occasions. The island of Vatuelele of the southern coast of Viti Levu is famous for its masi products.

Most Fijian mats are made from the leaves of the pandanus tree. The long process of preparation includes scraping and boiling the leaves, and drying them in the sun. There are different mats used for different occasions, and some are made as gifts for formal occasions such as weddings. Most mats are bordered with highly decorative and brightly coloured wool. One well-known Fijian mat is the kuta, made by women in Vanua Levu, particularly Bua. Also made out of Masi/tapa cloth, is the headdress called I-sala. Most of the time it is white.

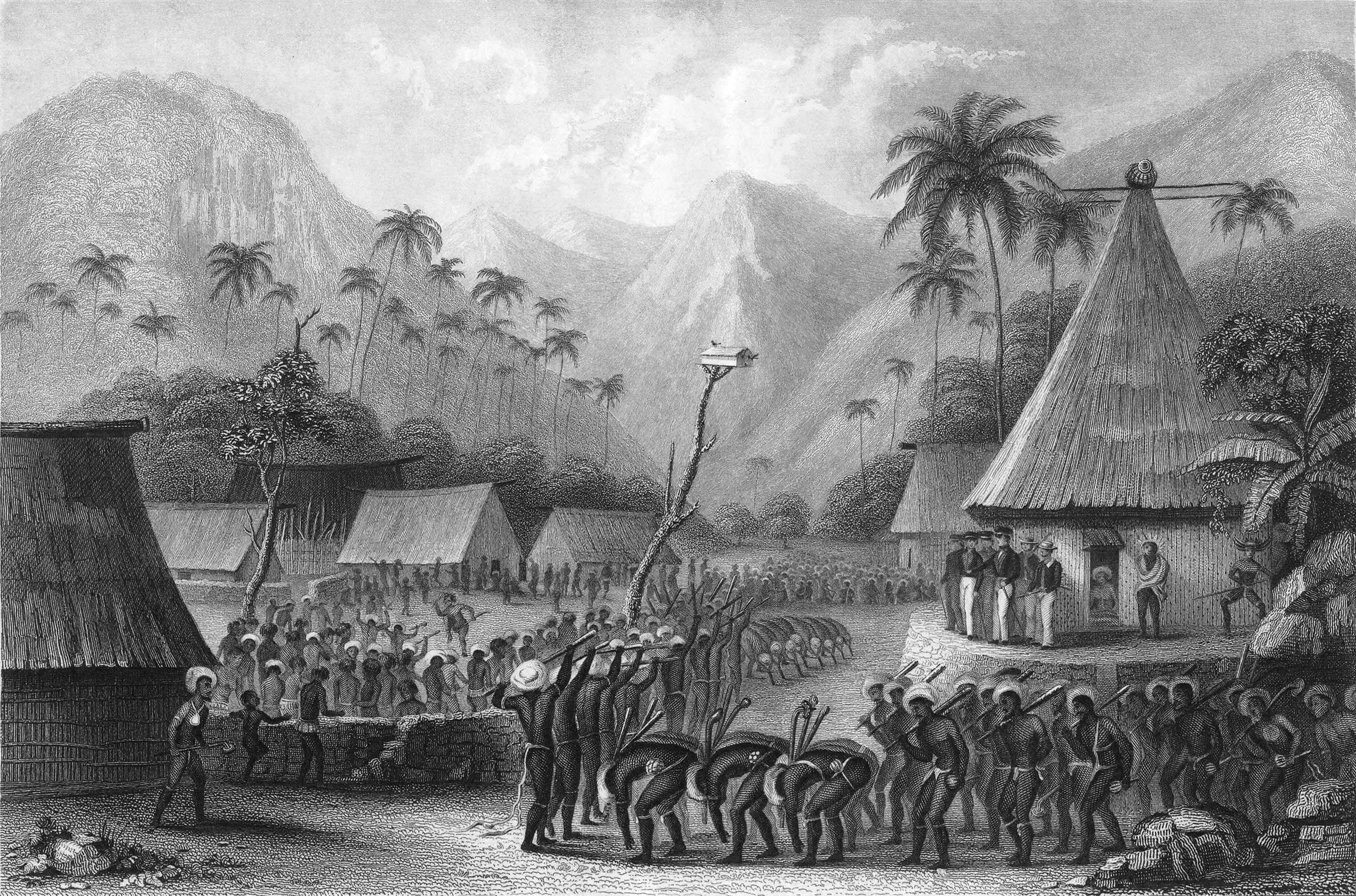
Fijian Dance, with men wearing the I-sala. Drawing by J. Drayton, 1845

Weaving using various materials was another craft generally mastered by the women but also aspects of weaving were mastered only by the men, various types of weaving practiced were and still are; basket weaving, coconut rope weaving, and coconut leaves weaving.

==== Men's crafts ====
Carving was practiced by the men; carving would be used for items of practical use, simple shapes and designs . A lot of effort was put into well adorned weapons and items for the home and ceremony. Today carving is practiced for its use in tourism and no longer plays a major role in Fijian society and life except in the case of the tanoa used for drinking kava.

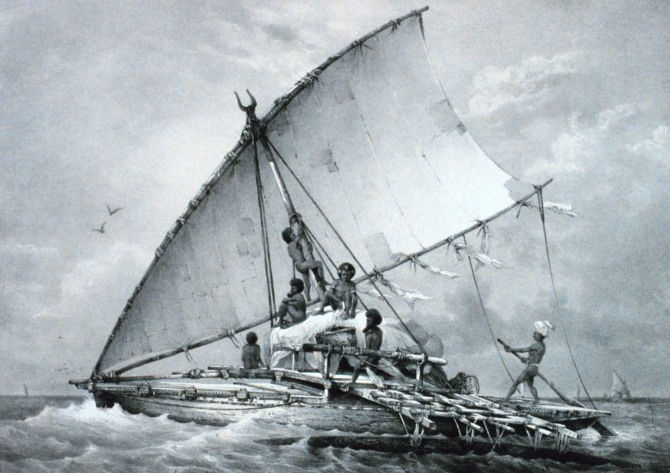
A Drua, the most impressive Fijian canoe.

Canoe building was another art practiced only by the men. Canoes were not only the major form of communication, but were important in all aspects of Fijian society, from the gathering of food and transporting of crops to use in presentation ceremonies and they were instrumental in fighting wars and the balance of politics. The art of canoe building was varied across the group and had several different types but of a similar design. The camakau was a small twin-hulled canoe for fishing or small transportation purposes. The most impressive canoes in Fiji were that of the Drua. In Fiji's early history before European involvement, control of the seaways was a major and decisive objective; disrupting or cutting off the enemy's supply and reinforcements gave great advantage in battle and would ensure victory. Sea battles involving hundreds of canoes were frequent. The canoe, which inspired fear and awe and so often held the balance was the mighty Drua. One of the most elaborate and beautiful artifacts of Oceania, the Drua was a product of considerable group effort and human labor. Double hulled and of gigantic proportions, the Drua was a masterpiece of design and craftsmanship, requiring total community involvement in its construction and in its launching. Its speed out at sea would be in excess of twenty knots and still remained highly manoeuvrable, it was capable of carrying upward of 150 warriors and took some 6 to 7 years to build and would vary in length from 100 feet to 118 feet and have a mast height of 60 to 70 feet, in the mid-19th century the following accounts were recorded:

"Up went the huge sail, down went the great steering oars, splashing into the sea, and away we shot like a racehorse. Owing to the great rate at which we were going, the sea was like a hissing cauldron on either side of our course, and the vessel, instead of having time to mount over the smaller waves, cut its way through them." (West, 1869).

"It had a magnificent appearance with its immense sail of white mats; its velocity was almost inconceivable." (Wilkes, 1840).

Ratu Seru Cakobau commanded an impressive fleet which had Several Drua with armed warriors ready for battle the led Canoe was named 'Rusi I Vanua' or 'Cursed is the land'. Much of the art of Canoe building has been lost and only a small few still practice the art on a very small scale as its use in this modern era seems to have lost its place. The craft of Canoe building was traditionally reserved for the male.

=== Performing arts ===
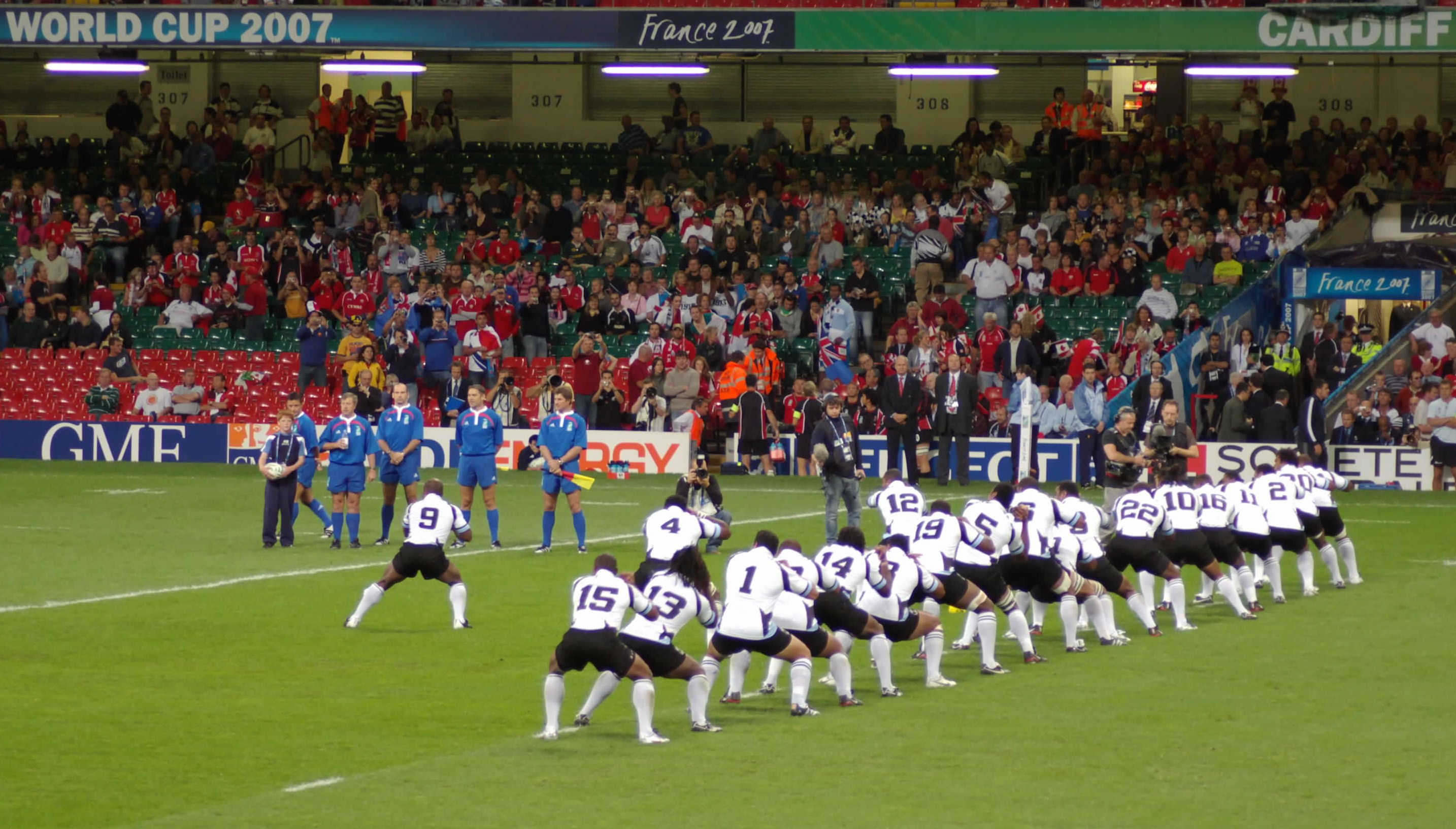
Fijian rugby team performing a traditional war dance before their rugby encounter with Canada

==== Meke ====
An indigenous art form is the Meke, which may incorporate the seasea (women's fan dance) or a meke wesi (men's spear dance). It is usually a narrative of an important event such as a war, a chiefly installation, or even a scandal. Some mekes are generations old, and form an important part of Fiji's oral history. In olden times, the meke was considered to be an oracle from the gods, and the Dau ni vucu, or composer, would often go into a trance before a performance. Others are modern, composed for a particular event, much as a poet laureate might write a poem to celebrate an event in a Western country.

Each district of Fiji has its own form of meke, performed in the local dialect. Other forms of Polynesian and Melanesian dance art forms exist with most widely known being dances of Rotuma and Tonga. There are also various Indian dances and Chinese dances which are performed at relevant festivals marking important times for these communities which are now a part of Culture in Fiji.

==== Music ====
Music of Old Fiji consisted of various chants which often told a story or preserved information to be passed on from generation to generation, these songs used various traditional instruments.

With the introduction of European and Asian cultures music in Fiji has evolved and songs sung in the Fijian vernacular are popular but so also are songs in Indian and English, some local artists mix all three languages and traditional instruments from each culture. A distinct Indian sound has evolved in Fiji that some see as influencing modern Indian music and even jazz.

=== Clothing and costume ===
The traditional attire was grass skirts for women and loin cloths for men. Skirts were short for single women, and long for married women, with girls wearing virgin locks before marriage. Most girls had the lower parts of their bodies decorated with tattoos after their first menstruation, as an initiation from girlhood into womanhood. Chiefs dressed more elaborately.

Modern Fiji's national dress is the sulu, which resembles a skirt. It is commonly worn by both men and women. One type worn by both men and women is the 'Sulu vaka Toga' pronounced Sulu vakah Tonga which is a wrap around piece of rectangular material which is elaborately decorated with patterns and designs of varying styles this is for more casual and informal occasions. Many men, especially in urban areas, also have Sulu vaka taga which is a tailored sulu and can be tailored as part of their suit. Many will wear a shirt with a western-style collar, tie, and jacket, with a matching Sulu vaka taga and sandals, this type of sulu can be worn to a semi formal or formal occasion. Even the military uniforms have incorporated the Sulu vaka taga as part of their ceremonial dress.

Women usually wear a multi-layered Tapa cloth on formal occasions. A blouse made of cotton, silk, or satin is often worn on top. On special occasions, women often wear a tapa sheath across the chest, rather than a blouse. On other occasions, women may be dressed in a chamba, also known as a sulu i ra, a sulu with a specially crafted matching top.

There are many regional variations throughout Fiji. Residents of the village of Dama, in Bua Province Fiji wear finely woven mats called kuta, made from a reed.

While traditional and semi-traditional forms of dress are still very much in use amongst indigenous Fijian culture, there is a greater influence for Western and Indian Fashion in urban areas as in neighboring developed nations.

=== Traditions and ceremonies ===
Etiquette in indigenous Fijian ceremony is rather intricate depending on the function as various formalities and presentations do several things; firstly it shows respect between two communal groups, strengthens tribal and family ties and reinforces social, tribal and family ties. Various items are used in ceremony and surrounded by ceremony such as Kava, known in Fiji as yaqona, which is Fiji's national drink. Traditionally, it was used only in important ceremonies. Nowadays, it is a social beverage. There is a strict protocol associated with yaqona drinking. One should clap once, clasping the hands, take the cup, and drink the yaqona in a single draft before returning the cup to the bearer. Another highly prized item in ceremony is the tabua or Whale's tooth, other items also the use of tapa cloth (masi) and mats are also used traditionally in ceremony. In modern day, practices such as the bulubulu ceremony (which acts as a mediation between two people, a victim and offender) will incorporate the kava and tabua into the ritual. Also various regions have tradition that has been passed down generation to generation for centuries one example are the firewalkers of beqa. The Sawau tribe of Beqa are noted for their ability to walk on white hot stones without being burned. Strict rituals have to be observed before the firewalking ceremony. There is an ancient myth about how an ancestor of the Sawau tribe was given this power by a spirit god in exchange for his life, after the god was captured by the man who was fishing for eels.

=== Cuisine ===
The cuisine of Fiji in pre-colonial times consisted of root crops, vegetables, and fruits, as well as various land animals such as wild pig, and various birds. The coastal tribes would have had the same, but also had a large amount of local seafood. These would have been prepared with local herbs and spices on wood fire rock ovens. Most cooking areas were located in the center of the house so the smoke would repel insects and strengthen the roof thatching. Another popular method of cooking, which is still used today, is the lovo which is an earth oven — a fire made in a pit in the ground lined with heat-resistant stones. It closely resembles the hāngī of the New Zealand Māori. When the stones are hot, food wrapped in (banana) leaves are placed in the pit, covered with soil and left to cook before being exhumed and eaten. Dishes cooked this way include palusami, parcels of taro leaves saturated with coconut milk, onions, and sometimes tinned meat.

Modern Fijian Cuisine is rather diverse with great influence from Indian cuisine and spices. When these are applied to local traditional dishes, it makes for interesting eating. European, Indian, and Chinese variants of cuisine, along with traditional foods, are commonplace in most, if not all households in Fiji.

=== Architecture ===
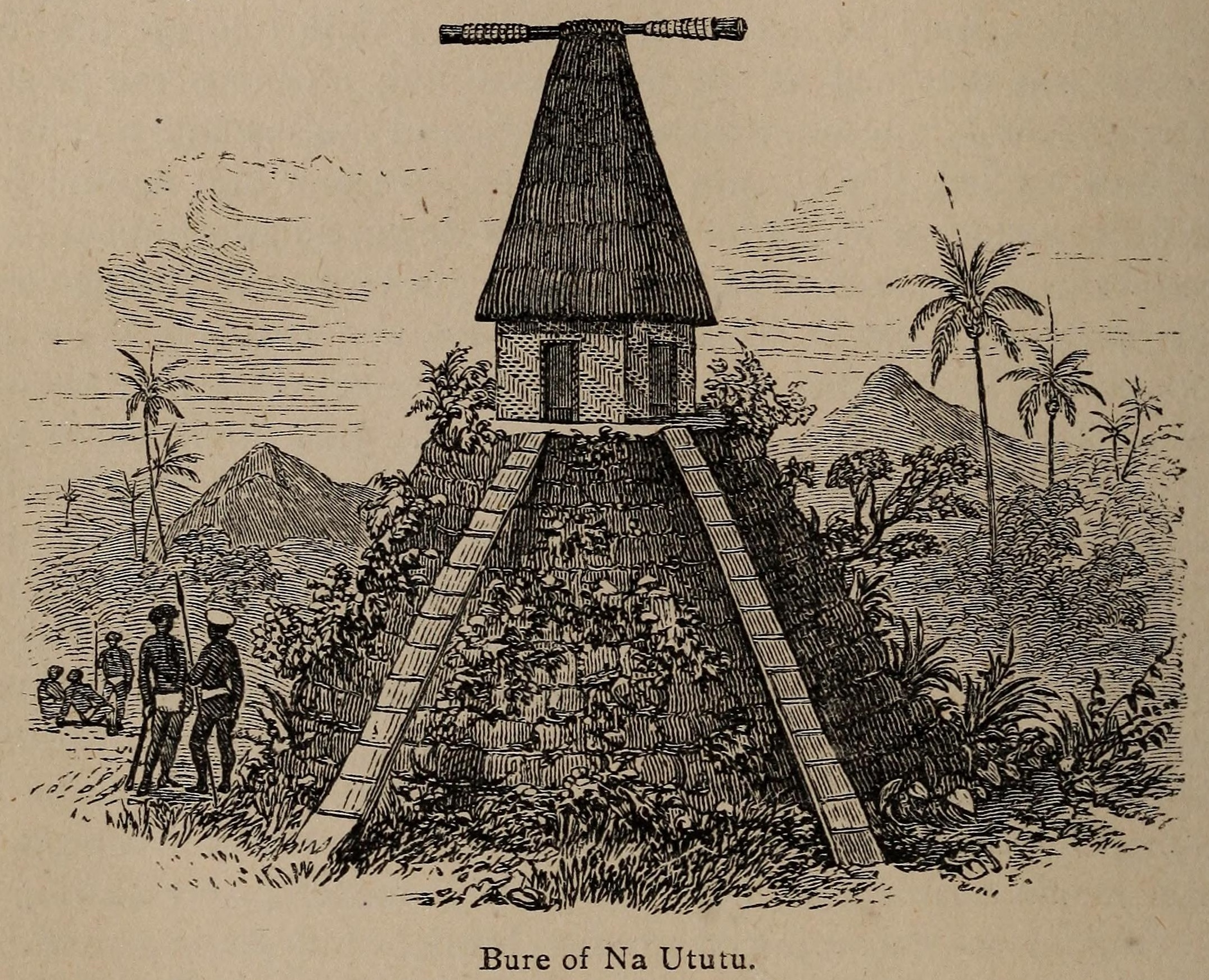
A bure kalou, a sketch done in the early 1800s.

In Old Fiji, the architecture of villages was simple and practical to meet the physical and social needs of the people and to provide communal safety. The houses were square in shape and with pyramid like shaped roofs, and the walls and roof were thatched and various plants of practical use were planted nearby, each village having a meeting house and a Spirit house. The spirit house was elevated on a pyramid like base built with large stones and earth, again a square building with an elongated pyramid like roof with various scented flora planted nearby.

The houses of Chiefs were of similar design and would be set higher than his subjects houses but instead of an elongated roof would have similar roof to those of his subjects homes but of course on a larger scale.

With the introduction of communities from Asia aspects of their cultural architecture are now evident in urban and rural areas of Fiji's two main Islands Viti Levu and Vanua Levu. A village structure shares similarities today but built with modern materials and spirit houses (Bure Kalou) have been replaced by churches of varying design.

The urban landscape of early Colonial Fiji was reminiscent of most British colonies of the 19th and 20th century in tropical regions of the world, while some of this architecture remains, the urban landscape is evolving in leaps and bounds with various modern aspects of architecture and design becoming more and more evident in the business, industrial and domestic sector, the rural areas are evolving at a much slower rate.

=== Literature ===
The emergence of Fiji's literature (as distinct from oral literature) coincides with the country's transition to independence in 1970. Among the first published works of Fijian literature, in the late 1960s and early 1970s, were Raymond Pillai's short stories (in English) and Pio Manoa's poetry (in English and in Fijian). More recent notable Fiji writers include Satendra Nandan (poet and novelist), Sudesh Mishra (poet), Larry Thomas (playwright), and Joseph Veramo (novelist).

=== Christmas ===
Christmas is an official holiday of Fiji. It is a special time of celebration, observed by the majority of the Fijian people. They wear local unique attires, symbolising the celebration of new beginnings. The lovo, a type of earth oven, is the main form of meal preparation and includes a traditional feast of staples such as fish, taro and pork. Most resorts are erected with Christmas decorations and put on special events for the holiday season. In cities such as Nadi and Suva, Western-style Christmas decorations can be seen in outdoor public spaces.

== Education ==
- Foundation for the Education of Needy Children in Fiji

== Religion ==
Religion is quite diverse with Christianity being the dominant faith in Fiji. Many Christian denominations are present in Fiji, the most prevalent of which is Methodist. Of the other Asian religions the Hindu faith is dominant, followed by Islam. There are other belief systems observed by Fijians as well.

=== The impact of Christianity ===
The impact of Christianity in the 19th century resulted in certain traditions being proscribed. In the pre-Christian era, human sacrifice was practiced. Men were buried alive to hold the pillars to the house of a chief. Cannibalism was practiced, too: the bodies of enemies slain in battle, or in sacrifice, were piled up and cooked for festivals, such as the installation of chiefs or the launching of a great canoe. Seru Epenisa Cakobau, the Bauan warlord who united the disparate tribes of Fiji and proclaimed himself King in 1871, renounced cannibalism on his conversion to Christianity in 1854.

A bure kalou, a pre-Christian Fijian religious building.

=== Old religion ===
Fiji's old religion is no longer practiced by the majority in the indigenous community who have adopted Christianity. Old deities are still acknowledged and respected, but not worshipped. Fijian rituals still exist in private.

=== Demographics ===
Of the various faiths, Christianity is the dominant belief system and including all the various denominations of the Christian faith they number in total 449,482. Hindus, with their various denominations, number in total 261,097. Muslims make up 54,324 of Fiji's population. Followers of other belief systems make up 10,166 of Fiji's population.

== Sports ==
Sports culture is unique as different racial mixes and cultures come together in a common interest. Fiji is fanatical about sports, the two most dominant being rugby and soccer.

=== Traditional sports ===
Sports in older times had a practical place, apart from recreation: helping to train young warriors. One such practice would have the older men bring the male children a severely injured captive of war, allowing the boys to practice their archery skills against this living target. There were other sports that were practiced in older times which are not practiced now. Notable traditional sports used to be played were tiqa, ulutoa, veisaga, and veicolo.

=== Modern sports ===
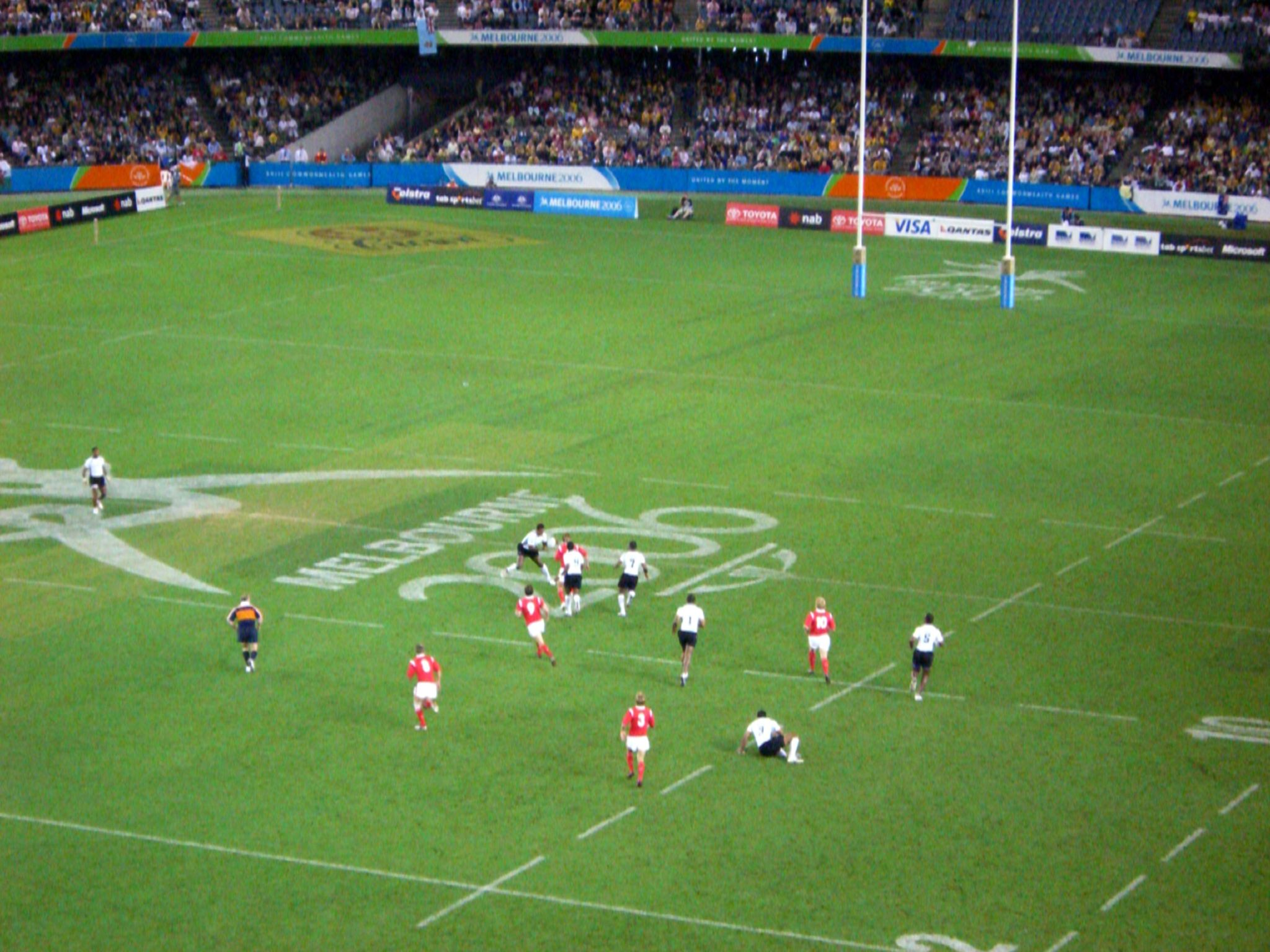
The Fiji sevens team at the 2006 Commonwealth Games in Melbourne

Sports have developed greatly over the past two decades in Fiji with a wide variety of sports undertaken. Fiji is most well known for its prowess in the game of rugby union and in particular rugby sevens.

==== Rugby union ====
Rugby union is the most popular sport in Fiji. The highest level of competition is the Colonial Cup. The Fiji national rugby union team has competed in five Rugby World Cup competitions. The Fijian Rugby Sevens team is constantly one of the top two or three teams in the world, often the premier team.

==== Rugby league ====
Rugby league is a popular team sport played in Fiji. The Fiji national rugby league team is known as Fiji Bati, with the team competing in three Rugby League World Cup competitions. They made it to the semi-finals of the 2008 Rugby League World Cup.

==== Soccer ====
Soccer was a minor sport, but over the last decade with further international funding from FIFA and sound local management of the sport has grown in popularity amongst the Indian community initially but now also the Fijian community.

==== Other sports ====
Many other sports have a following. Vijay Singh has been a world champion in golf, as has Tony Philps in surfing. Cricket, Sailing of varying forms, various adventure sports, athletics, martial arts and boxing are all popular.
