= Nadroga dialect =

West Fijian dialect of Fiji

Nadroga
- Native to: Fiji
- Region: South-Eastern quarter of Viti Levu, Vatulele and the Mamanuca Group
- Native speakers: (undated figure of 15,000)
- Language family: Austronesian: Malayo-Polynesian; Oceanic; Central Pacific; West Fijian - Polynesian; West Fijian – Rotuman; West Fijian; Nadroga

Language codes
- ISO 639-3: –
- Glottolog: None

Nadroga (pronounced [naˈɳɖʳoŋa]), is a prominent dialect of the West Fijian languages spoken in mostly in the western region of the Fiji Islands. It is often used as the generic standard of West Fijian. It takes its name from the ancient region and modern day province of Nadroga/Navosa, in Viti Levu, an area already unique for its own material culture, language and beautiful landscapes. Known as one of the prestige dialects of Fiji (which include the dialects of Rewa, Cakaudrove and Lau), Nadroga is popularly identified, and sometimes lampooned, by the change of Standard Fijian 's' to 'h' and the turbulent pitch and rapidness in which the language is spoken and can widely be identified by non-speakers within Fiji as a result of those characteristics. It is a dialect that is less understood by native Fijian speakers due to different sounds and spelling of common words.(Becker E. Anne, 1995) For example, the Fijian greeting word "bula" is "cola" in Nadroga/Navosa dialect.

== Geography and Distribution ==
Nadroga is spoken along the Southern-Western coast of the island of Viti Levu, the islands of Vatulele (or Vahilele), within the Mamanuca Group as well as parts of Serua and Nadi. It is closely related to the Nadi and Serua Dialects and to a lesser extent, the dialects of Ba and Yasawa. Nadroga is spoken primarily as a first language by close to 10,000 people within the province of Nadroga-Navosa, by migrants in urban centers in Fiji and the world. It is spoken as a second language by close to 5000 more, mostly of Indian descent. It also known by various other names such as the Nadroga Dialect, the Nadroga Language and colloquially as Nadrogan. The population of Nadroga and Navosa province are distributed in 24 districts with very strong cultural ties with their chiefly households.

== Nadroga Phrases ==
Hello/Life: Cola

How are you?: I Kuca Koto?

Pleased to meet you: E kwa marautaki na ledaru hota

What's your name?: O cei mu yaca

Thankyou: Vina or Vinakwa

My name is...: Qu yaca o...

Sorry: Vohosia

Please: Kerekere

Excuse me: Julou

Hot/Cold: Katakata/Kakahali

Rain: Ku /Juru na luvu

Sun: Higa

Good Morning: Cola

Goodnight/Goodbye: Moce re

I understand: Qi kilasia

Finished: Osi ho

I can't: Qi tamu/tahi/tabu rewa /tahi rewa/tasi rewa

== See also ==
- Culture of Fiji
