= Naivalu =

Naivalu is a surname. Notable people with the surname include:

- Jovesa Naivalu (born 1978), Fiji-American athlete
- Sainimili Naivalu (1986–2019), Fijian paralympic athlete
- Sefa Naivalu (born 1992), Australian rugby union player
- Solomone Naivalu (fl. 2001–2006), Fijian politician
