= Fiji national rugby league team =

International rugby league football team

Fiji

Team information
- Nickname: Fiji Bati
- Governing body: Fiji National Rugby League
- Region: Asia-Pacific
- Head coach: Mick Potter
- Captain: Tui Kamikamica
- Most caps: Kevin Naiqama (25)
- Top try-scorer: Akuila Uate (14)
- Top point-scorer: Wes Naiqama (132)
- Home stadium: National Stadium
- IRL ranking: 7th

Uniforms
First colours

Team results
- First international
- Western Samoa 32–18 Fiji (Apia, Samoa; 1992)
- Biggest win
- Fiji 72–6 Wales (Townsville, Australia; 5 November 2017)
- Biggest defeat
- New Zealand 78-0 Fiji (Cbus Super Stadium, Gold Coast; 31 October 2026)
- World Cup
- Appearances: 7 (first time in 1995)
- Best result: (bronze) Semifinals (2008, 2013, 2017)

The Fiji national rugby league team, nicknamed the Bati (Fijian: [mˈbatʃi], lit. 'Warriors'), has been participating in international rugby league football since 1992. The team is controlled by the governing body for rugby league in Fiji, Fiji National Rugby League (FNRL), which is currently a member of the Asia-Pacific Rugby League Confederation (APRLC). Fiji have thrice reached the semi-finals of the Rugby League World Cup, in 2008, 2013 and 2017, and are currently ranked 6th in the International Rugby League's World Rankings. They are coached by Fijian Wise Kativerata, and their captain is Tui Kamikamica. The team will typically perform the hymn "Noqu Masu" before each match, singing in unison.

== History ==
=== 1990s ===
The game was introduced to Fiji only in 1992 but despite this there has been a long history of Fijian players making their mark in rugby league, most notably back in the 1960s when great players such as Joe Levula and Laitia Ravouvou joined Rochdale Hornets and became household names in the English competition.

Interest and participation in rugby league snowballed throughout Fiji, and as well as continued success in the Rugby League World Sevens, the Batis began playing full 13-aside games against international teams. By 1994, Fiji had hammered the Great Britain amateurs 40–8 and, captained by mighty front-rower James Pickering, beat France 20–12.

They had also produced their first rugby league superstar after winger Noa Nadruku joined Canberra Raiders and in 1993 became the top try-scorer in the Australian competition.

Fiji took part in their first World Cup in 1995 where, just as the 2000 World Cup, they had the misfortune to be placed in the same group as both England and Australia. But the Batis made a massive impression in their opening World Cup game in which they ran riot against South Africa, 52–6, and had the crowd on their feet at Keighley.

During the Super League war, Fiji, like most countries other countries, aligned itself with Super League. In search of international competition, the Australian Rugby League played a match against a "National Rugby League of Fiji" team in 1996. This match has been granted Test status by the ARL, but not by the Rugby League International Federation.

=== 2000s ===
Coached by Don Furner, Sr. and captained by Lote Tuqiri, Fiji competed in the 2000 World Cup but did not progress past the tournament's group stage.

The Fiji Bati qualified for the 2008 Rugby League World Cup held in Australia after finishing second in Pacific qualifying behind Tonga. Fiji's qualification campaign started with a thrilling 30–28 loss to Samoa before reversing the scoreline a few days later with a 30–28 win over the Tongans. Fiji won their final qualifying game against Cook Islands 40–4. Having qualified the Vodafone Fiji Bati team started their Rugby League World Cup 2008 campaign with 42–6 win over France followed by a 2-point defeat to Scotland, however they topped their group with a superior points difference. Beating Ireland in their quarter final they came within one match of the World Cup final, but were defeated by Australia, ending the tournament in 4th place.

=== 2010s ===
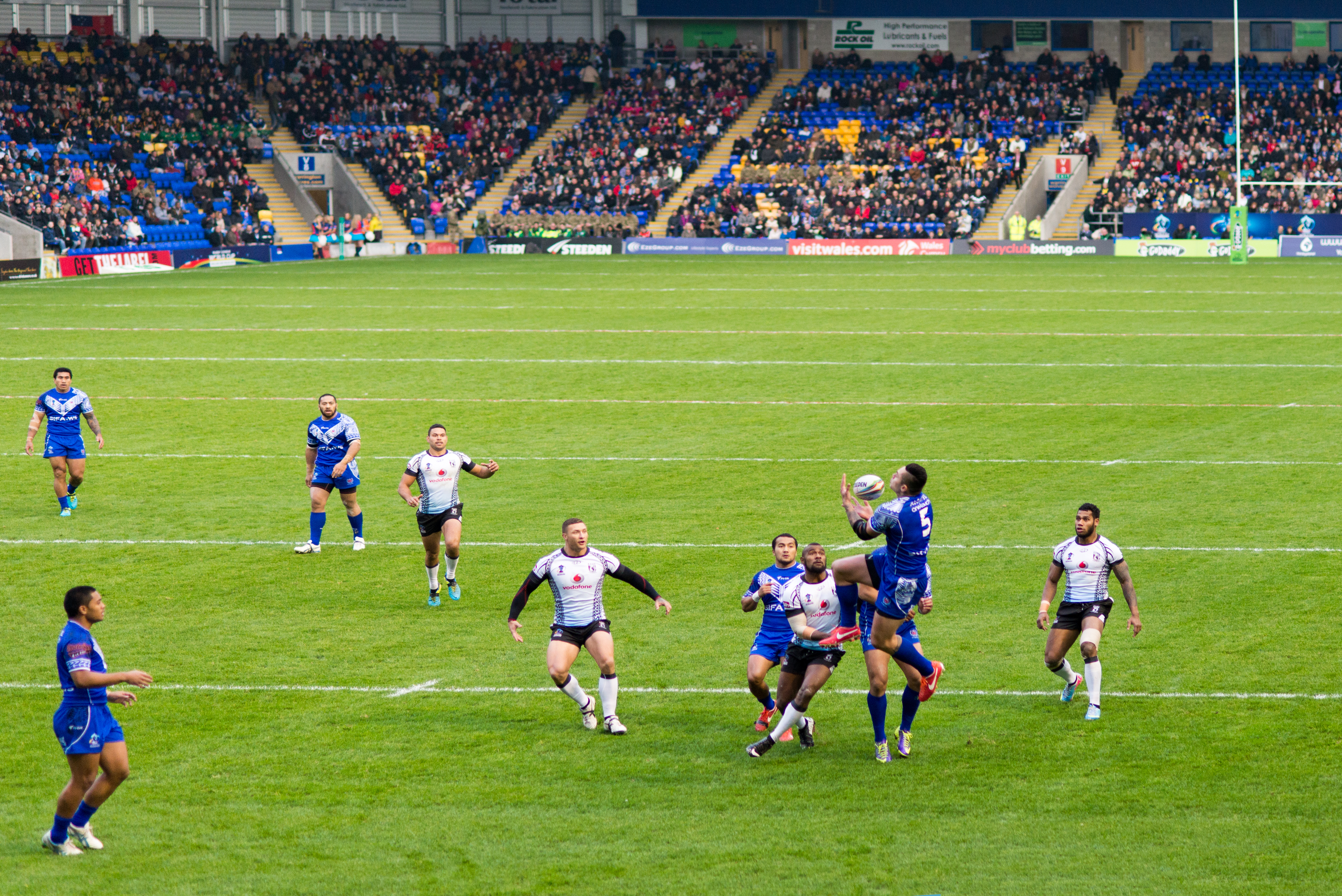
Fiji vs Samoa at the 2013 Rugby League World Cup

Fiji automatically qualified for the 2013 Rugby League World Cup after participating in the 2008 tournament. They took on Australia, England and Ireland in the pool stage. In their first match they took on 'the Wolfhounds'. They played at the famous Spotland Stadium, in Rochdale, where Fiji have an historic affiliation with. The Fijians convincingly won by a score of 32–14. As expected Fiji lost to both Australia and England, although they surprised many, as they only conceded 34 points against the teams in each game and they led 2–0 against Australia, and were within a few minutes of taking a half-time lead against England. Fiji would take on 'fierce Pacific rivals' Samoa in the quarter-final. They won the, passionate pacific, fixture and they would celebrate with a 22–4 victory. They celebrated even more, as it meant Fiji reached their second consecutive World Cup semi-final. They took on Australia again, but this game was nothing like the group stage fixture. Fiji's errors conceded them 62 points against a classy Australian side. This defeat ended and equalled their best World Cup campaign in their history.

In May 2014, Fiji took on Samoa in the 2014 Pacific Rugby League Test at Penrith Stadium. The International was created as a qualifier for the final 2014 Four Nations spot. It was also a chance for the Four Nations team (winner of this international) to warm-up before the event kicked off later in the year. Fiji failed to qualify with their fierce pacific rivals getting the better of them by 32–16.

In May 2015, Fiji took on Papua New Guinea in the 2015 Melanesian Cup test at Cbus Super Stadium. Fiji won the match and the inaugural Melanesian Cup title. Fiji never looked like losing the match after an easy first half performance, leading 18–0 at the break. They went on to win the test match by 22–10.

In May 2016, Fiji took on Papua New Guinea in the 2016 Melanesian Cup test at Pirtek Stadium. Fiji had a similar situation in this year's Melanesian Cup with a half-time score of 16–8 but this time around they conceded too many second half points allowing the Kumuls to make a shock comeback and win the match 24–22.

In the 2017 Rugby League World Cup in New Zealand & Australia, Fiji topped Group D before recording their biggest upset victory, defeating New Zealand 4–2 in the quarter-finals. They then lost to Australia 54–6 in the semi-finals.

=== 2020s ===
Fiji automatically qualified for the 2021 Rugby League World Cup having reached the semi-finals of the previous Rugby League World Cup. The 2021 tournament will take place in England.

== Kit ==
Primary	1992–1995	1995 World Cup	2008 World Cup

=== Kit suppliers and sponsors ===
Period	Kit provider	Sponsor on front of shirt	Sponsor on top of back of shirt	Sponsor on sleeves
2024–present	(Australia) Dynasty Sport	Sky Sport		

== Players ==
=== Current squad ===
A squad of 23 players selected for the 2026 Rugby League World Cup was announced on 5 October 2026 on social media.

Jersey numbers in the table reflect team selection for the Round 3 match against New Zealand.

Statistics in the table are drawn from the website, Rugby League Project.

J#	Player	Age	Position(s)	Fiji Bati						Club	Club Matches
J#	Player	Age	Position(s)	Dbt	M	T	G	F	P	Club	Tier 1	Tier 2
1	Sunia Turuva	24	Fullback, Wing	2022	13	5	0	0	20	Wests Tigers	97	33
2	Ronald Philitoga	25	Wing	2025	3	0	0	0	0	Northern Pride RLFC	0	46
3	Waqa Blake	32	Centre	2019	13	15	0	0	60	Bradford Bulls	207	41
4	Solomone Saukuru	21	Centre	2025	5	4	0	0	16	Wests Tigers	4	19
5	Semi Valemei	27	Wing	2022	13	8	0	0	32	Castleford Tigers	53	35
6	Kurt Donoghoe	24	Five-eighth	2024	6	0	0	0	0	Dolphins (NRL)	56	24
7	Brandon Wakeham	27	Halfback	2019	16	1	59	1	123	Manly Warringah Sea Eagles	57	76
8	Jacob Saifiti	30	Prop	2015	10	1	0	0	4	Newcastle Knights	192	19
9	Apisai Koroisau	33	Hooker	2013	20	1	21	0	46	Wests Tigers	254	5
10	Emosi Ravosai	—	Prop	2026	3	0	0	0	0	New Zealand Warriors	0	3
11	Taane Milne	31	Second-row, Centre	2017	20	6	16	0	56	Huddersfield Giants	132	73
12	Kitione Kautoga	24	Second-row	2022	8	2	0	0	8	Parramatta Eels	37	41
13	Caleb Navale	23	Lock	2023	10	3	0	0	12	Manly Warringah Sea Eagles	12	30
14	Josese Lanyon	22	Hooker	2026	3	0	0	0	0	Wests Tigers	4	17
15	Elijah Keung	20	Prop	2026	2	0	0	0	0	South Sydney Rabbitohs	0	1
16	Jordan Miller	21	Prop	2024	3	0	0	0	0	Parramatta Eels	2	21
17	Joseph Litidamu	—	Centre, Wing	—	1	0	0	0	0	Melbourne Storm	0	24
18	Jordin Leiu	27	Second-row, Lock	2026	2	0	0	0	0	Norths Devils	0	103
19	Apenisa Driti	26	Prop	2026	1	0	0	0	0	Northern Pride RLFC	0	10
20	Zion Johnson	25	Wing	—	0	0	0	0	0	Sunshine Coast Falcons	0	42
21	Bayleigh Bentley-Hape	26	Fullback	2026	2	0	0	0	0	South Sydney Rabbitohs	10	42
22	Kylan Mafoa	—	Prop	2024	3	0	0	0	0	Manly Warringah Sea Eagles	0	14
S	Mitchell Prest	23	Prop	2026	2	0	0	0	0	Mackay Cutters	0	40

Notes:

- Age is as at the last update, 31 October 2026 (after the match against New Zealand).
- Clubs outside the NRL and Super League are shaded in the above table.
- Zion Johnson was brought into the squad to replace initial selection, Jimmy Ngutlik, who had previously played (3 matches) for Papua New Guinea in the 2021 World Cup).

== Records ==
- **Bold**- denotes that the player is still active.

=== Most capped players ===
#	Name	Career	Caps
1	**Kevin Naiqama**	2009-2022	25
2	Akuila Uate	2006-2018	18
3	**Apisai Koroisau**	2013-2022	17
3	**Tui Kamikamica**	2016-2022	17
3	Eloni Vunakece	2007-2018	17
6	**Viliame Kikau**	2015-2022	16
6	Junior Roqica	2011-2019	16
8	Ashton Sims	2008-2017	15
9	Wes Naiqama	2006-2014	14
9	James Storer	2008-2017	14
9	**Ben Nakubuwai**	2016-2022	14

=== Top try scorers ===
#	Name	Career	Tries
1	Akuila Uate	2006-2018	14
2	**Suliasi Vunivalu**	2017-2019	12
3	**Viliame Kikau**	2015-2022	11
4	**Kevin Naiqama**	2009-2022	10
5	Jarryd Hayne	2008, 2017–2018	8

=== Top points scorers ===
#	Name	Career	Points	Tries	Goals	Field Goals
1	Wes Naiqama	2006-2014	132	7	52	0
2	**Brandon Wakeham**	2019-2022	66	1	31	0
3	Akuila Uate	2006-2018	56	14	0	0
4	**Suliasi Vunivalu**	2017-2019	50	12	1	0
5	**Apisai Koroisau**	2013-2022	46	1	21	0

== Competitive record ==
The table below shows Fiji's all-time international rugby league record. They have been participating in International fixtures since 1992.

As of 22 October 2026

Country	Matches	Won	Drawn	Lost	Win %	For	Aga	Diff
American Samoa	1	1	0	0	100%	16	14	+2
Australia	7	0	0	7	0%	24	378	–354
Australian Aboriginies	1	1	0	0	100%	21	20	+1
Canada	1	1	0	0	100%	26	12	+14
Cook Islands	16	10	1	5	62.5%	489	263	+226
England	3	0	0	3	0%	22	146	–124
England Knights	1	1	0	0	100%	44	8	+36
France	2	2	0	0	100%	62	18	+44
Great Britain	1	0	0	1	0%	4	72	–68
Ireland	2	2	0	0	100%	62	28	+34
Italy	2	2	0	0	100%	98	14	+84
Lebanon	4	2	0	2	50%	118	118	0
Māori	1	0	0	1	0%	12	32	–20
New Zealand	2	1	0	1	50%	22	26	-4
New Zealand Residents	1	1	0	0	100%	34	16	+18
Niue	2	1	0	1	50%	34	38	–4
Papua New Guinea	17	5	0	12	29.41%	279	425	–146
Rotuma	1	1	0	0	100%	32	12	+20
Russia	1	1	0	0	100%	38	12	+26
Samoa	12	8	0	4	66.67%	274	184	+90
Scotland	2	1	0	1	50%	46	32	+14
South Africa	1	1	0	0	100%	52	6	+46
Tonga	13	5	1	7	38.46%	221	296	–75
United States	1	1	0	0	100%	58	12	+46
Wales	1	1	0	0	100%	72	6	+66
Total	94	48	2	44	51.06%	2,102	2,126	–24

=== Rugby League World Cup ===
World Cup record
Year	Round	Position	GP	W	L	D
(England) 1995	Group stage	6/10	3	1	2	0
(England) (France) (Ireland) (Scotland) (Wales) 2000	Group stage	12/16	3	1	2	0
(Australia) 2008	Semi-finals	4/10	4	2	2	0
(England) (Wales) 2013	Semi-finals	4/14	5	2	3	0
(Australia) (New Zealand) (Papua New Guinea) 2017	Semi-finals	4/14	5	4	1	0
(England) 2021	Quarter-Finals	6/16	4	2	2	0
(Australia) (Papua New Guinea) 2026	Group Stage	8/10	3	1	2	0
Total	0 Titles	4/13	27	13	14	0

=== Four Nations ===
Four Nations record
Year	Round	Position	GP	W	L	D
(England) (France) 2009	Not Invited					
(Australia) (New Zealand) 2010	Failed to Qualify					
(England) (Wales) 2011	Not Invited					
(Australia) (New Zealand) 2014	Failed to Qualify					
(England) 2016	Not Invited					
Total	0 Titles	0/5	0	0	3	0

=== Pacific Cup ===
Pacific Cup record
Year	Round	Position	GP	W	L	D
(New Zealand) 1992	Group stage	9/10	4	1	3	0
(Fiji) 1994	Second Place	2/10	6	4	2	0
(New Zealand) 1997	Group stage	5/6	3	0	2	1
(New Zealand) 2004	Group stage	4/6	2	1	1	0
(New Zealand) 2006	Second Place	2/6	3	2	1	0
(Papua New Guinea) 2009	Semi-finals	3/5	2	1	1	0
Total	0 Titles	6/12	20	9	10	1

=== Margins and streaks ===
Biggest winning margins

Margin	Score	Opponent	Venue	Date
66	72–6	Wales	1300SMILES Stadium	5 Nov 2017
56	60–4	Italy	Kingston Park	22 Oct 2022
52	58–6	Cook Islands	Carlaw	26 Oct 1992
50	56–6	Cook Islands	HFC Bank Stadium	26 Oct 2024
46	58–12	United States	1300SMILES Stadium	28 Oct 2017
44	58–14	Lebanon	Leichhardt Oval	22 June 2019
36	42–6	France	WIN Stadium	1 Nov 2008

Biggest losing margins

Margin	Score	Opponent	Venue	Date
66	0–66	Australia	Alfred McAlpine Stadium	14 Oct 1995
64	0–64	Australia	Wembley Stadium	23 Nov 2013
52	0–52	Australia	Aussie Stadium	16 Nov 2008
50	0–50	England	AJ Bell	7 Oct 2022
48	6–54	Australia	Suncorp Stadium	23 Nov 2017

== IRL Rankings ==
IRL Men's World Rankings
Official rankings as of August 2026
Rank	Change	Team	Pts %
1	Steady	Australia	100
2	Steady	New Zealand	82
3	Steady	England	70
4	Steady	Samoa	56
5	Steady	Tonga	54
6	Steady	Papua New Guinea	47
7	Steady	Fiji	34
8	▲1	Cook Islands	24
9	▲2	Netherlands	23
10	▲2	Ukraine	21
11	▼3	France	21
12	▼2	Serbia	20
13	Steady	Wales	18
14	Steady	Ireland	17
15	Steady	Greece	14
16	Steady	Malta	14
17	▲12	Canada	13
18	▼1	Italy	11
19	▼1	Jamaica	9
20	▲7	Scotland	8
21	▲1	United States	8
22	▼3	Poland	7
23	▼3	Lebanon	7
24	▼1	Germany	7
25	▼1	Czech Republic	6
26	▼5	Norway	6
27	▼2	Chile	5
28	▲2	Philippines	5
29	▼1	South Africa	4
30	Steady	Brazil	3
31	Steady	Morocco	3
32	▲1	Argentina	3
33	▲2	Ghana	2
34	▲2	Kenya	2
35	▼1	Montenegro	2
36	▲1	Nigeria	2
37	▼5	North Macedonia	1
38	Steady	Albania	1
39	Steady	Turkey	1
40	Steady	Bulgaria	1
41	Steady	Cameroon	0
42	Steady	Japan	0
43	Steady	Spain	0
44	Steady	Colombia	0
45	Steady	Russia	0
46	Steady	El Salvador	0
47	Steady	Bosnia and Herzegovina	0
48	Steady	Hong Kong	0
49	Steady	Solomon Islands	0
50	Steady	Vanuatu	0
51	Steady	Hungary	0
52	Steady	Latvia	0
53	Steady	Denmark	0
54	Steady	Belgium	0
55	Steady	Estonia	0
56	Steady	Sweden	0
57	Steady	Niue	0
Complete rankings at www.internationalrugbyleague.com

== See also ==
- Fiji National Rugby League Competition
- Fiji women's national rugby league team
- Fiji National Rugby League
- Rugby league in Fiji
