= Steward Island, Fiji =

Island in Fiji

Steward Island
Native name: Davui
- Interactive map of Steward Island

Geography
- Location: South Pacific
- Coordinates: 18.4329932°S 178.0723715°E
- Archipelago: Viti Levu Group

Administration
- Fiji
- Division: Central
- Province: Rewa Province
- Tikina: Beqa

Demographics
- Population: unknown

Steward Island (also known as Davui) is a small resort island off the southwest coast of Beqa Island in Fiji in the South Pacific.

== Geography ==
Davui is a low reef island, located at the Beqa Lagoon. It is home to a private resort.
