= Nadroga-Navosa Province =

Province of Fiji

Coordinates: 18°00′S 177°40′E

Province of Nadroga-Navosa Nadroga-Navoha
- Province
- Nickname: Province of Stallions
- Motto: Hakwa Nadro
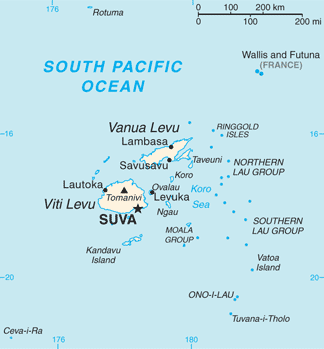
- Nadroga - South-Western corner of Vitilevu
- Interactive map of Province of Nadroga-Navosa
- Province: Nadroga-Navosa
- Island: Viti Levu
- Division: Western Division

Government

Area
  - Total: 921 sq mi (2,385 km^{2})

Population (2017)
  - Total: 58,931
  - Density: 64.00/sq mi (24.71/km^{2})
- Time zone: UTC+12 (1200 GMT)

Nadroga-Navosa (Nadroga: Nadroga-Navoha) is one of the fourteen provinces of Fiji and one of eight based in Viti Levu, Fiji's largest island. It is about 2,385 square kilometers and occupies the South-West and Central areas of Viti Levu, Fiji's principal island. The province includes the Mamanuca Archipelago, Malolo Islands, off the west coast of Viti Levu, Vatulele (or Vahilele in the Nadroga dialect), as well as the remote Conway Reef in the southwest.

== Geography ==
Nadroga is famous for its sunshine and white sandy beaches. Navosa remains wild, with the region significantly less developed than Nadroga. However, it is an area of rushing rivers, deep ravines and rugged mountains. The province of Nadroga-Navosa encompasses contrasting landscapes: the rugged and mountainous northern edges towards Viti Levu's interior, sand dunes and floodplains, to rolling hills of its hinterland, roamed by the province's symbol — the wild horse. Nadroga's coast is famous for its fine beaches and lagoons. The Mamanucas, a chain of reef-fringed islands off the western coast of Viti Levu are popular tourist and surfing destinations. Nadroga's coastal belt is an integral part of Fiji's Coral Coast — containing its leading hotels and resorts such as Shangri-La's Fijian Resort, Outrigger Fiji Beach Resort, Intercontinental Fiji Golf Resort & Spa, and others. Popular areas in Nadroga include Tavarua Island, Natadola Beach, Korotogo, Sigatoka, the Sand Dunes and the "Salad Bowl of Fiji" (Valley Road).

The Sigatoka Sand Dunes, a world heritage site and one of Fiji's principal archeological and historical locations, is in the province, about half a mile from Sigatoka Town. In July 1989, the dunes were designated as Fiji's first national park under the management of the National Trust of Fiji Islands. This distinct feature covers an area of 650 hectares and offers a rich combination of geomorphological, ecological, cultural and aesthetical attributes. The national park is of great importance for educational and recreational use and is a milestone in Fiji's drive for environment. The Sigatoka valley is known as the salad bowl of Fiji.

Other sites of great historical value are the 'Tavuni Hillfort' site (an ancient Tongan fortified settlement in the Sigatoka Valley) and the 'Momi Gunsite' (the site of two long-range cannons and played sentry to Momi Bay during World War II). Furthermore, Kula Eco Park which is a centre for conserving and housing native flora and fauna adds to the steps made by Nadroga and Fiji to safeguard the treasures of the islands.

Nadroga is of immense historical and archaeological importance. The Lapita people made their settlements in the province, the first in the country being at Bourewa, Nadroga. Nadroga was one of the larger states of Fiji in pre-colonial times.

== Culture ==
The people of Nadroga/Navosa are amongst the friendliest in Fiji, which has contributed to a vibrant and substantial tourism industry in the province. The iTaukei of Nadroga/Navosa speak their own language/dialect and possess their own material culture. Culture has a strong hold in Nadroga, where the traditional art of pottery making is kept alive, brought by the Lapita, who made their first Fiji settlement in Nadroga. Masi or Tapa making flourishes on Vatulele; in other parts, traditional salt making persists.

== Administration/governance ==
Nadroga-Navosa Province comes under the administrative jurisdiction of the Fiji Ministry of iTaukei Affairs through the Provincial Council. The council is chaired by Na Kalevu Ratu Sakiusa Makutu, who is also the traditional paramount chief of the province. Ratu Sakiusa is one of Fiji's hereditary chiefs, who exert a lot of political clout over the native Fijian population and take active part in national affairs. The province normally has three representatives in the Fiji Parliament.

=== Districts ===
Nadroga-Navosa includes the districts of Cuvu, Nasigatoka, Tuva, Malomalo, Wai, Malolo, Naqalimare, Namataku, Noikoro, Conua, Raviravi, Nokonoko, Waicoba, Mavua, Bemana, Navatusila, Koroinasau, Komave, Korolevu I Wai, Nasikawa, Nadrau, and Vatulele. The population is dispersed between the coastal and hinterlands, although major economic activity is focused more toward the coast where tourism and sugar are important sources of income.

== Demographics ==
The population at the 2017 census was 58,940, being the fifth largest province. The main town in Nadroga-Navosa is Sigatoka, with a population of 9622 (2007 census). Nadroga/Navosa's principal town is Sigatoka, situated near the mouth of the Sigatoka River.

=== 2017 Census ===
| Tikina (District) | Ethnicity | | | | | | Total |
| Tikina (District) | iTaukei | % | Indo-Fijian | % | Other | % | Total |
|---|---|---|---|---|---|---|---|
| Baravi | 6,473 | 77.7 | 1,667 | 20.0 | 192 | 2.3 | 8,332 |
| Cuvu | 4,643 | 63.9 | 2,494 | 34.3 | 127 | 1.7 | 7,264 |
| Malolo | 2,935 | 91.4 | 201 | 6.3 | 75 | 2.3 | 3,211 |
| Malomalo | 7,565 | 48.9 | 7,851 | 50.7 | 68 | 0.4 | 15,484 |
| Nasigatoka | 8,391 | 58.5 | 5,638 | 39.3 | 309 | 2.2 | 14,338 |
| Navosa | 5,038 | 98.7 | 58 | 1.1 | 10 | 0.2 | 5,106 |
| Ruwailevu | 3,546 | 80.0 | 876 | 19.8 | 8 | 0.2 | 4,430 |
| Vatulele | 768 | 99.1 | 1 | 0.1 | 6 | 0.8 | 775 |
| Province | 39,359 | 66.8 | 18,786 | 31.9 | 795 | 1.3 | 58,940 |

=== Christian State ===
Flag of the self-proclaimed "Nadroga-Navosa Sovereign Christian State"

There was an attempt in 2015 to create a "Christian state" in Nadroga-Navosa. This was described by the then Chief of Police, Ben Groenewald, as a harmless cult, but the prime minister Frank Bainimarama took a sterner view and ordered a clamp-down by the army.

== Economy ==
Nadroga-Navosa has one of the largest provincial economies in Fiji. Nicknamed the Coral Coast, Nadroga contains a high concentration of hotels and resorts outside of Nadi. Recently, there has been major growth in international residential developments. Tourism accounts for a large number of employees and provincial development.

Nadroga is regarded and nicknamed the 'Salad Bowl of Fiji', specifically the Sigatoka Valley, which produces a high volume of the nation's fruits, spices and vegetables, for local consumption and export. Dalo (or taro), often the domain of Eastern Fiji, is not as widely produced in Nadroga. Cassava (tapioca) is produced for consumption and export. The province is one of Fiji's sugar-producing areas, but the number of farms and production have declined in the past 10 years as farmers seek to diversify their crops and move to more lucrative crop options. Expiring native land leases have also contributed to a decline in sugar production. Cattle (beef) farming used to be a major economic activity led by the government-supported Yalavou Cattle Scheme, however, this has also declined in recent years.

== Prominent persons ==
Nadroga has produced some of modern Fiji's most recognized names in the fields of government, science, religion and sports. Some of the best known sons and daughters of Nadroga include:

- Chandra, Rajesh, academic
- Domolailai, Apisai, Rugby Sevens Player, 2016 Rio Olympics gold medalist
- Gavoka, Viliame, CEO of Fiji Visitors Bureau, General Manager of Resorts and Sodelpa Opposition Member
- Khaiyum, Aiyaz Sayed, former Attorney General
- Naiqamu, Osea, former member of Parliament
- Qiliho, Apimeleki, first indigenous Fijian Bishop in the Anglican Church
- Sharma, Gabriel, Anglican Episcopal Bishop of Western Viti Levu
- Vayeshnoi, Lekh Ram, former MP and minister of Youth and Sports
- Veremalua, Jasa (born 1988), rugby union player for the Tel Aviv Heat
- Vereniki Nalio, former 1960 Nadroga Rugby and Fiji Rugby Union player from Raiwaqa Village, Nadroga.

== Sports ==
Nadroga is a famous sporting hub of the Fiji Islands. It is the provincial home of Fiji's Para athlete, Iliesa Delana, who won Fiji's and the Pacific's first ever Paralympic gold medal.

Rugby is the obsession of Nadroga, with it being the most successful in both rugby competitions and producing rugby players for the national team. The Nadroga rugby team previously held the prestigious BSP Farebrother-Sullivan Cup from 2009 to September 29, 2012, after losing it to Suva. The re-took the Farebrother-Sullivan Cup in 2013 from holders Tailevu. They currently hold the Digicel Cup after winning it in 2013,2012, 2011, 2009, 2004, 2005, 2006, and 2007. The Farebrother-Sullivan Cup is the Holy Grail of Fiji rugby: Whoever holds the trophy is considered Fiji rugby champions.

Fiji's second largest sporting arena — Lawaqa Park, second only in size to the National Stadium — is in the province's capital of Sigatoka.

Nadroga is famous for the annual Bilibili Race, a festive sporting event involving employees of the province's hotels and resorts, located along the Coral Coast. Apart from the tug-of-war, sack race and other competitions, the highlight of the event is the famous "bilibili" (bamboo raft) race along the Sigatoka River.

=== Rugby ===
The Nadroga rugby team is the most successful and greatest provincial rugby team in Fiji rugby history. As of July 22, 2017, they have retained Fiji rugby's premier trophy, the Farebrother-Sullivan Cup for a record 111 times since the inception of the Farebrother-Sullivan challenge. The team held the Farebrother-Sullivan Cup for a record 9 years in a row from 1971 to 1979. The team known as the "Stallions" have held the Fiji Rugby Union Cup (under various sponsorship names) a record 26 times. Nadroga has contributed the highest number of rugby players to the Fiji national rugby 15s and 7s teams than any other team in Fiji rugby history. The team's junior grade (U20 and U21) has equally been successful.

The province have produced rugby league internationals like Lote Tuqiri, Noa Nadruku and current NRL New Castle Knights star winger, Akuila Uate, and current Parramatta Eels superstar [Maika Sivo]. The province have produced Super rugby stars internationals like former Crusaders & Waratahs winger[Nemani Nadolo], former Wallabies & Brumbies winger[Tevita Kuridrani], New Zealand Allblacks rugby winger[Waisake Naholo], and is also home to the Current Waikato Chiefs Rugby & New Zealand Allblacks rugby player Pita Gus Sowakula.

=== Other sports ===
Nadroga-Navosa province has produced Fiji boxing champions like Mitieli Navuilawa, Paula Kavika, Niko Degei, Mosese Kavika, Sakeasi Dakua, Luke Sisiwa, Iliavi Bose, Jone Mataitini, Ilatia Vaka, and Saiyad Hussein. In football, they have been national champions on three occasions. In athletics, Nadroga/Navosa has produced outstanding athletes like Napolioni Kurucibi, Mereoni Vibose, Temesia Kaumaiya and paralympic athlete Iliesa Delana — the 2011 IPC athletics world championship silver medalist and Paralympic champion in London 2012.
