= Firewalking =

Practice of walking over hot embers or stones

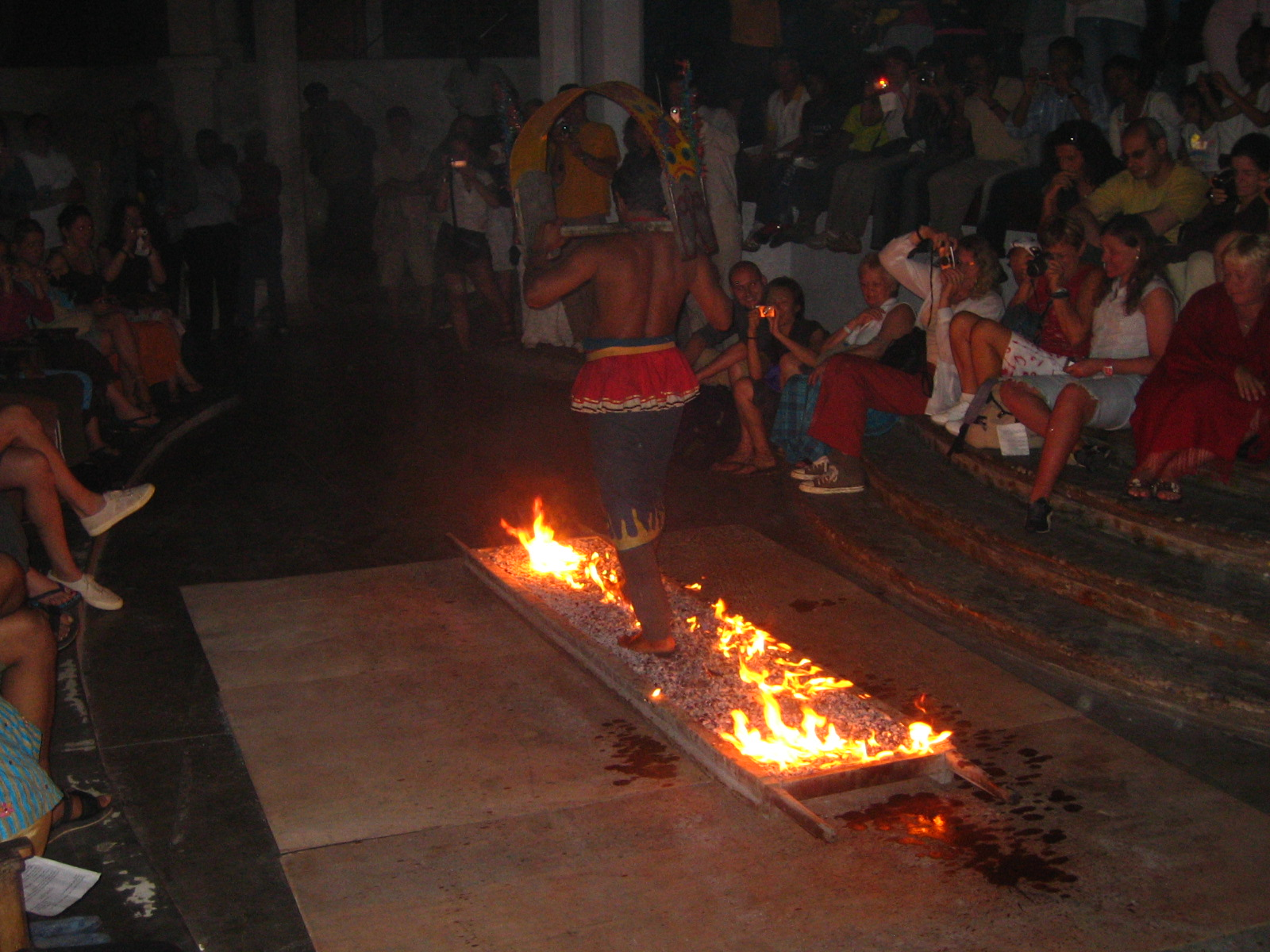
Firewalking in Sri Lanka

Firewalking is the act of walking barefoot over a bed of hot embers or stones. It has been practiced by many people and cultures in many parts of the world, with the earliest known reference dating from Iron Age India c. 1200 BCE. It is often used as a rite of passage, as a test of strength and courage, and in religion as a test of faith.

Firewalking festival in Japan, 2016

Modern physics has explained the phenomenon, concluding that the foot does not touch the hot surface long enough to burn and that embers are poor conductors of heat.

== History ==
Walking on fire has existed for several thousand years, with records dating back to 1200 BCE. Cultures across the globe use firewalking for rites of healing, initiation, and faith.

Firewalking is also practiced by:

- The Sawau clan on the island of Beqa, 10 kilometres (6 miles) to the south of Viti Levu in the Fijian Islands. The phenomenon was examined in 1902 when it was already a tourist attraction, with a "Probable Explanation of the Mystery" arrived at.
- San Pedro Manrique, a village of Soria, Central Spain
- Eastern Orthodox Christians in parts of Greece (see Anastenaria) and Bulgaria (see nestinarstvo), during some popular religious feasts.
- Tribes throughout Polynesia, documented in scientific journals (with pictures and chants) between 1893 and 1953.
- The Pà Thẻn people of Vietnam celebrate the Fire Dancing (or Fire Jumping) Festival, which includes walking, jumping, and dancing over fire and burning embers.

== Persistence and functions ==
Social theorists have long argued that the performance of intensely arousing collective events such as firewalking persists because it serves some basic socialising function, such as social cohesion, team building, and so on. Émile Durkheim attributed this effect to the theorized notion of collective effervescence, whereby collective arousal results in a feeling of togetherness and assimilation. A scientific study conducted during a fire-walking ritual at the village of San Pedro Manrique, Spain, showed synchronized heart rate rhythms between performers of the firewalk and non-performing spectators. Notably, levels of synchronicity also depended on social proximity. This research suggests that there is a physiological foundation for collective religious rituals, through the alignment of emotional states, which strengthens group dynamics and forges a common identity amongst participants.

== Physics ==
Per the second law of thermodynamics, when two bodies of different temperatures meet, the hotter body will cool off, and the cooler body will heat up, until they are separated or until they meet at a temperature in between. What that temperature is, and how quickly it is reached, depends on the thermodynamic properties of the two bodies. The important properties are temperature, density, specific heat capacity, and thermal conductivity.

The square root of the product of thermal conductivity, density, and specific heat capacity is called thermal effusivity, and determines how much heat energy the body absorbs or releases in a certain amount of time per unit area when its surface is at a certain temperature. Since the heat taken in by the cooler body must be the same as the heat given by the hotter one, the surface temperature must lie closer to the temperature of the body with the greater thermal effusivity. The bodies in question here are human feet (which mainly consist of water) and burning coals.

Due to these properties, David Willey, professor of physics at the University of Pittsburgh at Johnstown, points out that firewalking is explainable in terms of basic physics and is neither supernatural nor paranormal. Willey notes that most fire-walks occur on coals that measure about 1,000 °F (538 °C), but he once recorded someone walking on 1,800 °F (980 °C) coals.

Additionally, Jearl Walker has postulated that walking over hot coals with wet feet may insulate the feet due to the Leidenfrost effect.

=== Factors that prevent burning ===
- Water has a very high specific heat capacity (4.184 J g^{−1} K^{−1}), whereas embers have a very low one. Therefore, the foot's temperature tends to change less than the coal's.
- Water also has a high thermal conductivity, and on top of that, the rich blood flow in the foot will carry away the heat and spread it. On the other hand, embers have a poor thermal conductivity, so the hotter body consists only of the parts of the embers which are close to the foot.
- When the embers cool down, their temperature sinks below the flash point, so they stop burning, and no new heat is generated.
- Firewalkers do not spend very much time on the embers, and they keep moving.

=== Risks when firewalking ===
- People have burned their feet when they remained in the fire for too long, enabling the thermal conductivity of the embers to catch up.
- One is more likely to be burned when running through the embers since running pushes one's feet deeper into the embers, resulting in the top of the feet being burnt.
- Foreign objects in the embers may result in burns. Metal is especially dangerous since it has a high thermal conductivity.
- Embers which have not burned long enough can burn feet more quickly. Embers contain water, which increases their heat capacity as well as their thermal conductivity. The water must be evaporated already when the firewalk starts.
- Wet feet can cause embers to cling to them, increasing the exposure time.

A myth that persists is that safe firewalking requires the aid of a supernatural force, strong faith, or an individual's ability to focus on "mind over matter".

Since the 20th century, this practice is often used in corporate and team-building seminars and self-help workshops as a confidence-building exercise.

== See also ==
- Bed of nails
- Fire eating
- Timiti
