= Carlaw =

Carlaw is a surname. Notable people with the name include:

- Arthur Carlaw, New Zealand rugby league player
- Dane Carlaw (born 1980), Australian professional rugby league footballer
- Jackson Carlaw CBE (born 1959), Scottish Conservative politician
- James Carlaw, New Zealand rugby league administrator
- John Carlaw (born 1975), Australian professional rugby league footballer
- Walter M. Carlaw DFC (1899–1956), Scottish flying ace during World War I
- Thomas Carlaw Martin FRSE LLD (1850–1920), Scottish newspaper editor, Director of the Royal Scottish Museum

== See also ==
- Carlaw Park, multi-purpose stadium in Parnell, a central suburb of Auckland, New Zealand
