= Sainimili Naivalu =

Fijian athlete and disability rights activist (1986-2019)

- Occupations: Disability rights activist, table tennis champion

Sainimili Naivalu (1986–2019) was a paralympic athlete and disability activist from Fiji. She represented Fiji in international wheelchair table tennis competitions and was awarded gold and silver medals.

== Biography ==
Naivalu was born in 1986 and was from Dakuibeqa on Beqa island in Fiji. She was born with caudal regression syndrome, which meant that she was a wheelchair user all her life. Her father was a church elder and her mother a housewife. She was a member of the Spinal Injury Association in Fiji. She was also a representative of the Fiji Disabled People's Federation. She was vocal about how people with disabilities needed to be consulted so that Fiji could progress to greater inclusivity. She saw three central concerns for disabled people in Fiji: accessibility, medical supplies and security - in particular in the aftermath of natural disasters.

A wheelchair table tennis para-athlete, Naivalu competed at an international level, winning a silver medal in doubles table tennis with partner Merewalesi Rodan at the 2017 Oceania Para Championships. In 2015 she won gold in the doubles with partner Mark Harris at the International Table Tennis Federation Oceania Cup.

Naivalu died in 2019.

== Selected works ==
- Devine, A., Carrol, A., Naivalu, S., Seru, S., Baker, S., Bayak-Bush, B., & Marella, M. (2017). They don't see my disability anymore’–The outcomes of sport for development programmes in the lives of people in the Pacific. Journal of Sport for Development, 5(8), 4–18.
- Devine, A., Carroll, A., Naivalu, S., & Seru, S. (2018). Promoting Effective Implementation of Disability Inclusive Sports for Development Programmes. Lessons Learnt from Australian Government Programs in the Pacific. Journal of Paralympic Research Group, 9, 43–62.
