= Foundation for the Education of Needy Children in Fiji =

NGO in Fiji

FENC Fiji is a Non-governmental organization in Fiji. Its mission is to provide education and related support to underprivileged children. The organisation was founded in 2009.

In 2023 FENC announced that it would broaden its mission to help needy families.

== Contributions ==
Fence Fiji offers scholarships and related support to children of the poorest families, which have been identified as Deceased parent(s) where the child is living under the care of a widow, widower or family member earning a weekly income below $100; Families with cash flow income below $100/week with one or several children with disabilities; children with one or both parents in prison; children of farm laborer's/seasonal laborer's engaged in piece-meal work in daily rates of $10–$15, etc. In 2019 it provided assistance to around 3000 students; in 2023, it had 5000 applicants for assistance. In 2024 it provided back-to-school packs to 1100 children.

Support from Fenc Fiji covers tuition at approved, zoned schools; and school supplies such as but not limited to books, bags, shoes, stationary, and uniforms. Fenc Fiji only assists children from Class 1 – Form 7; excludes Tertiary, Kindergarten and boarding schools unless cases of death, distance or emergencies. Fenc Fiji attempts to cover the entire Fiji Islands, with 3 Divisional Officers. The Nadi office covers the entire Western Division; the Labasa office covers the entire Northern Division and the office, and the Suva office covering the Central/Eastern Division.
