= Bati (Fiji) =

Bati (pronounced [mˈbatʃi]) are the traditional warriors of the Fiji Islands the word itself loosely translated means soldier, bodyguard in Fijian. it is derived from the word meaning teeth or edge and In old Fiji two types of subjection were recognized called Qali and Bati, The Qali was a province or town subject to a Chief town and Bati denotes those which are not directly subject but less respected than the Qali, the Bati bordered an area subject to the Chief and provided him with a service, and from here derives the terms Mataqali and Bati.

Bati is now understood in Fijian Culture as the term for the island's traditional warrior class or caste. The Bati are traditionally among the strongest Fijians.

Each Fijian village has an intricate traditional infrastructure and a Chieftain will have a Bati Clan traditionally aligned with him.

== Warrior Caste ==
There were several class of warrior or Bati, for example you could have Bati Balavu, these warriors would be the outer guard and would guard the chief from a great distance, then you would have Bati Leka these were the inner guard and bodyguards of the Chief, there was also Bati Kadi which were mercenaries for hire.
