= Vatulele =

Coral and volcanic island in Fiji

Native name: Vahilele
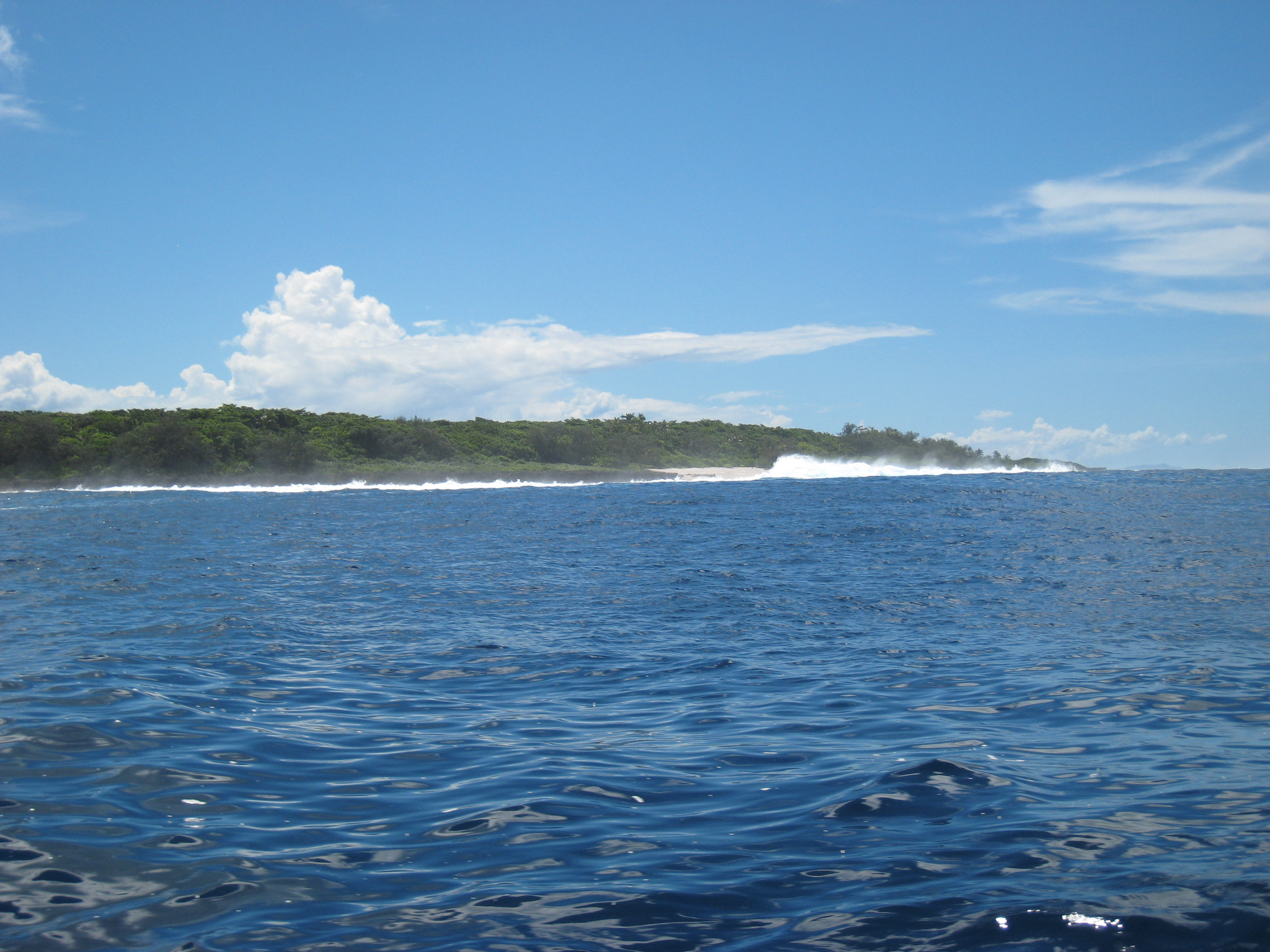
- Vatulele

- Location in Fiji Vatulele (Oceania)

Geography
- Location: South Pacific Ocean
- Coordinates: 18°32′30″S 177°37′40″E
- Archipelago: Viti Levu Group
- Area: 32 km^{2} (12 sq mi)
- Length: 13 km (8.1 mi)
- Width: 3 km (1.9 mi)
- Highest elevation: 320 m (1050 ft)

Administration
- Fiji
- Division: Western Division
- Province: Nadroga-Navosa
- Largest settlement: Ekubo

Demographics
- Population: 775 (2017)

Vatulele (pronounced [βatuˈlele]) is a coral and volcanic island 32 kilometres (20 miles) and tikina, located south of Viti Levu, Fiji's largest island.

There are four villages on the island: Lomanikaya, Ekubo, Taunovo and Bouwaqa. Economic activities include coconut and taro farming, fishing, and selling of Fijian hand printed tapa. Vatulele is known for its prawns and petroglyphs. The island has a chiefly title known as the Vunisa Levu.

== Tourism ==
Vatulele is a raised coral limestone island that lies to the south of Fiji's main island of Viti Levu. It is known for prawns known as ura-buta (cooked prawns) or uradamudamu (red prawn). The islanders treat the prawns with great respect, consider them sacred and are forbidden to kill or harm them in any way. Legend records that anyone who tries to take them away will suffer a shipwreck. The prawns live in anchialine habitats - pools some distance away from the sea but which still maintain tidal influence. Most of the pools are brackish due to interactions between the lens of freshwater under the island and the tidal influence. Linked with these anchialine pools is a network of caves and passages.

Vatulele has many makers of tapa cloth (masi). The masi comes from the bark of the paper mulberry tree, and all over the island there are small clearings in the forest which have been planted with this tree.

There are petroglyphs on Vatulele dated at 3000 years old. They were painted using dye made from haematite, and subjects include human figures, turtles, and abstract symbols.
