= Beqa =

- Island and Tikina
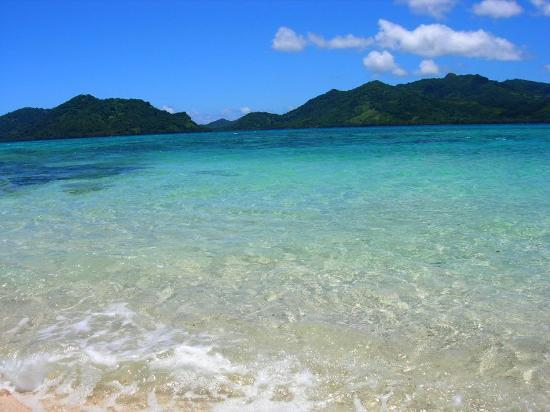
- Beqa

- Location in Fiji
- Coordinates: 18°24′S 178°08′E
- Country: Fiji
- Archipelago: Viti Levu Group
- Division: Central Division
- Province: Rewa

Area
  - Total: 36.3 km^{2} (14.0 sq mi)
- Elevation: 440 m (1,440 ft)

Population (2017)
  - Total: 1,356
  - Density: 37.4/km^{2} (96.7/sq mi)

Beqa (Fijian pronunciation: [mbeŋɡa], also spelled Mbengga in phonetic English) is an island in Fiji, an outlier to the main island of Viti Levu, 10 kilometres (6.2 miles) to the south. The island has a land area of 36.3 square kilometres (14 square miles) and reaches a maximum elevation of 440 metres (1,440 feet). Beqa has 9 villages divided between 2 tikinas (districts): Sawau and Raviravi. To the west is the island of Yanuca.

The villages of Dakuibeqa (the chiefly village of the Sawau people), Dakuni, Soliyaga, Naceva and Naiseuseu are part of the tikina (district) of Sawau. The villages of Nawaisomo, Raviravi, Lalati and Rukua are part of the tikina (district) of Raviravi.

== Tradition ==
Of the 9 villages on the island, Dakuibeqa, Dakuni, Soliyaga, Naceva, and Rukua are noted for the tradition of fire-walking. The phenomenon was examined in 1902 when it was already a tourist attraction, with a "Probable Explanation of the Mystery" arrived at.

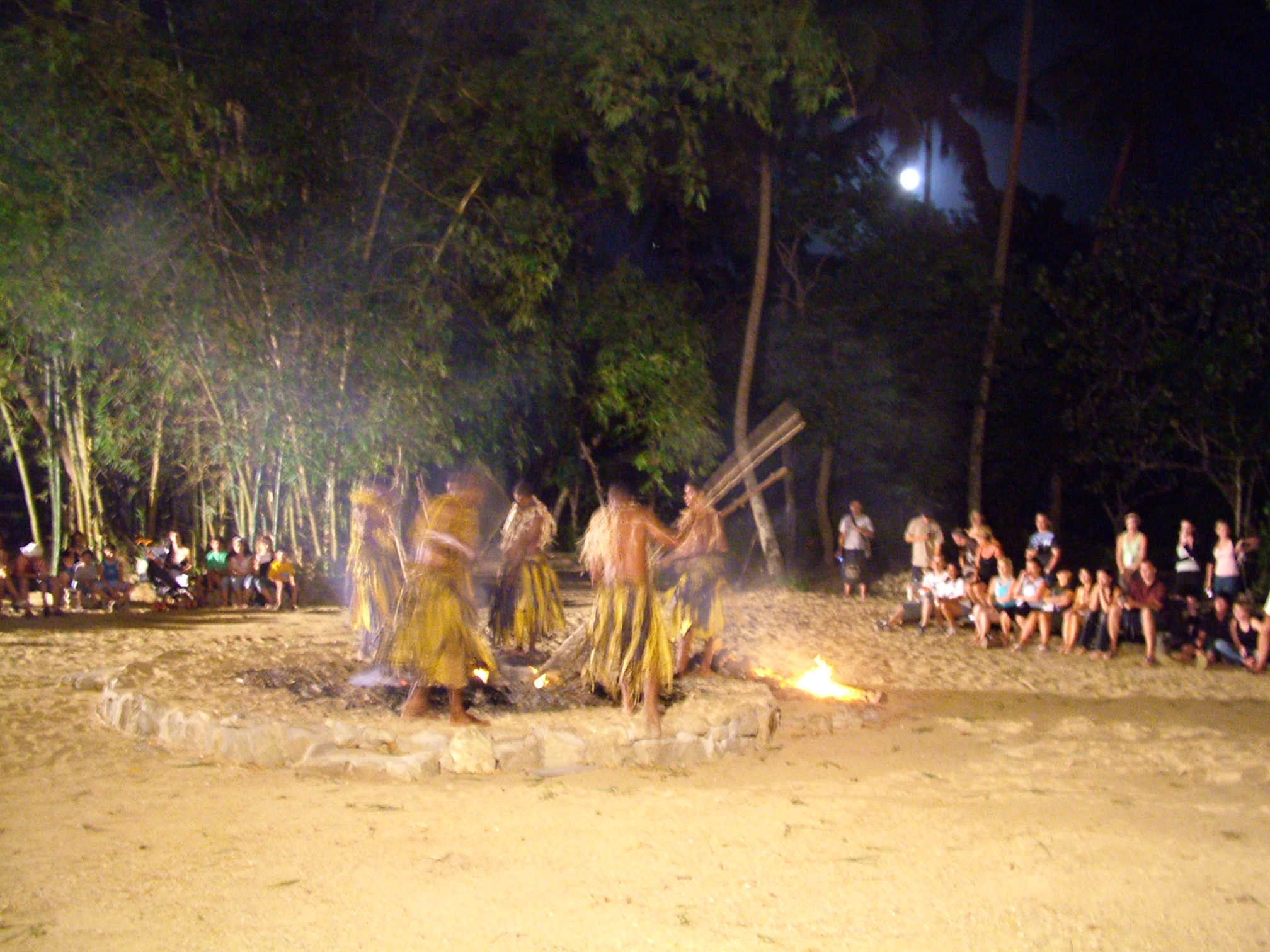
Vilavilairevo - Traditional Beqa Firewalking

== Energy ==
The Fiji Times reported on 25 February 2006 that over 3000 inhabitants of six villages and five resorts were exploring ways to find a reliable source of electricity for Beqa. Wind and solar power were being considered, as was a cable across Beqa Strait from the mainland.

== Economy ==
Beqa's main source of income is tourism; it has 4 resorts: Lawaki Beach House, Beqa Lagoon Resort (formerly Marlin Bay Resort), Kulu Bay Resort, Lalati Resort. Additionally, Royal Davui Resort is located on an Islet off Beqa, Steward Island. No other resorts are planned for Beqa. There is some small scale farming ventures and with improved infrastructure this could be expanded and become a larger revenue earner for the various villages of Beqa.

Beqa has developed a name for off season tomatoes, due to the unique climate Beqa has which allows tomatoes to be planted year round.

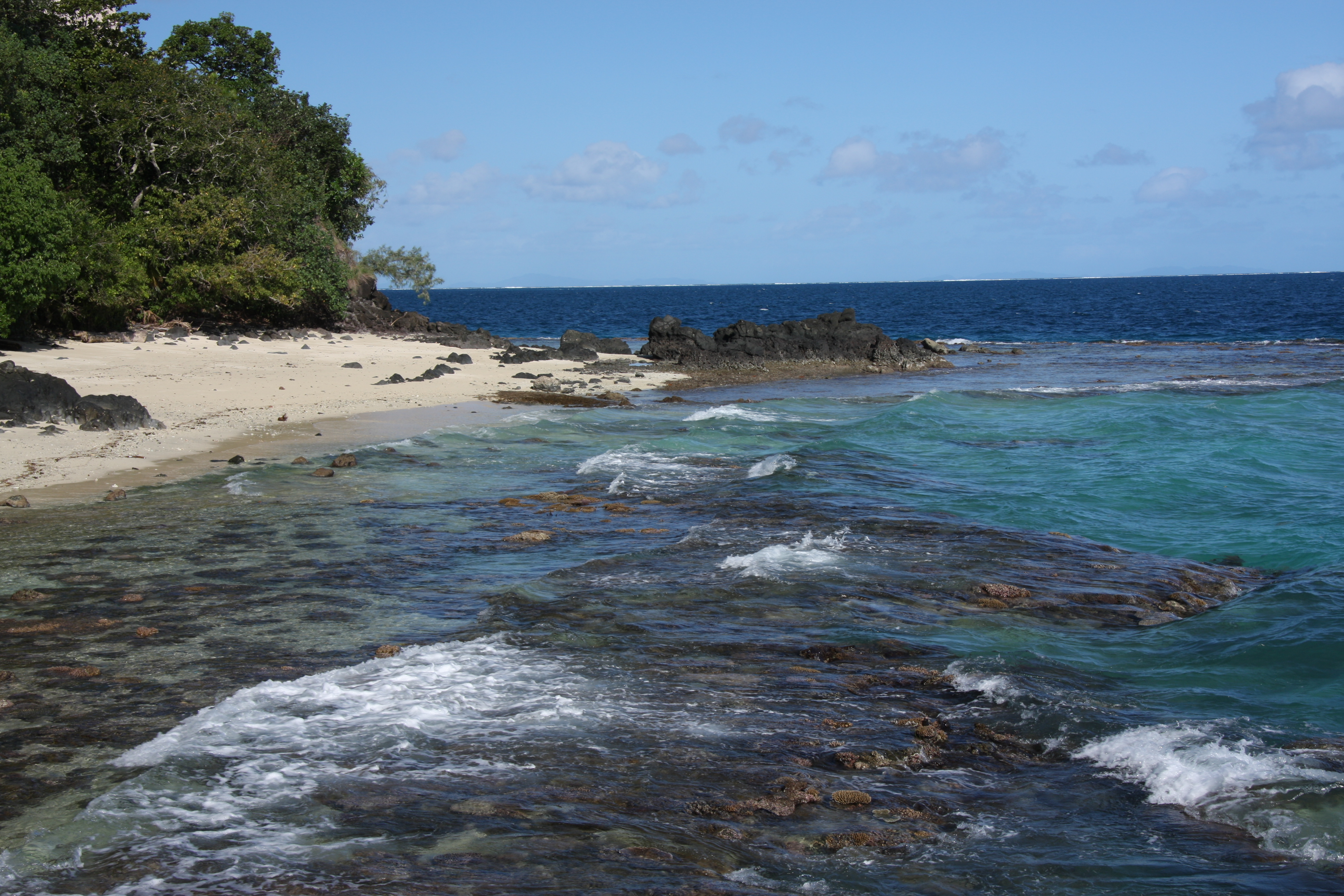
Beach - Royal Davui Resort - Beqa Lagoon - Fiji

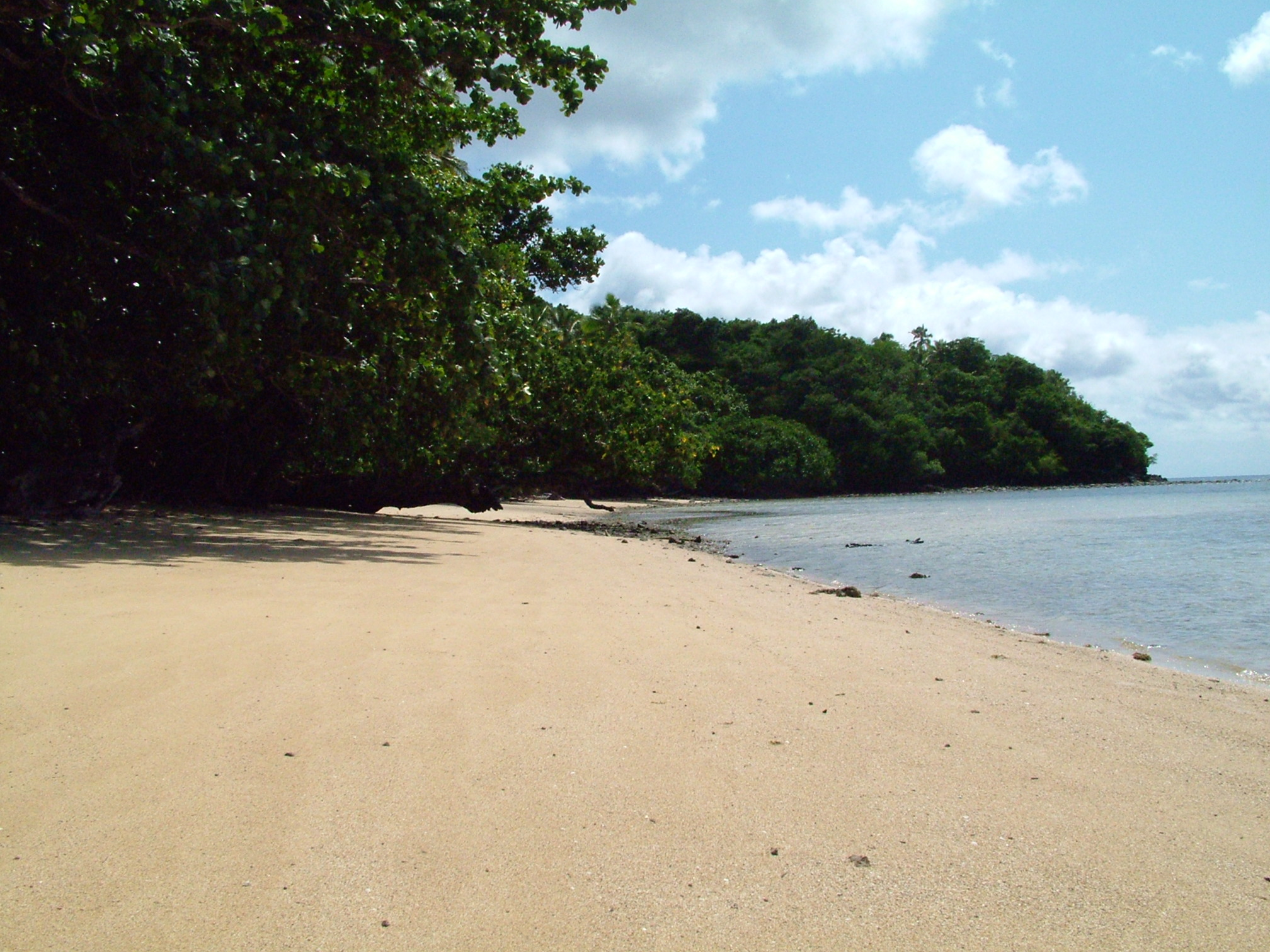
Beach - Dule Beach Beqa Island - Fiji

== Notable people ==
- Sainimili Naivalu, wheelchair table tennis medalist and disability rights activist.
- Elina Nasaudrodro, Fijian international judōka, originally from Dakuni village

== See also ==
- List of islands
