= Sawau =

- Tikina (district)
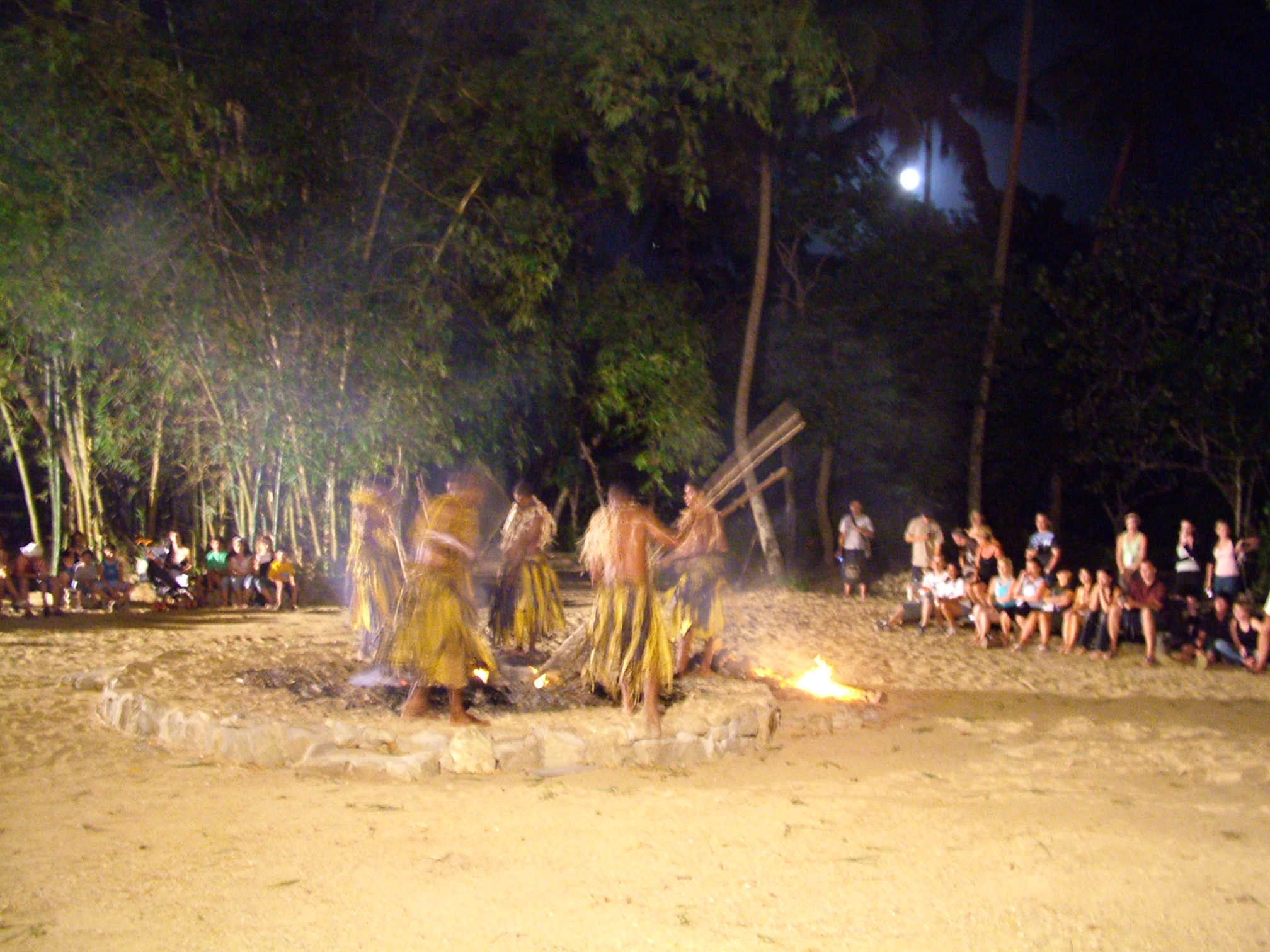
- Vilavilairevo - Traditional Beqa Firewalking

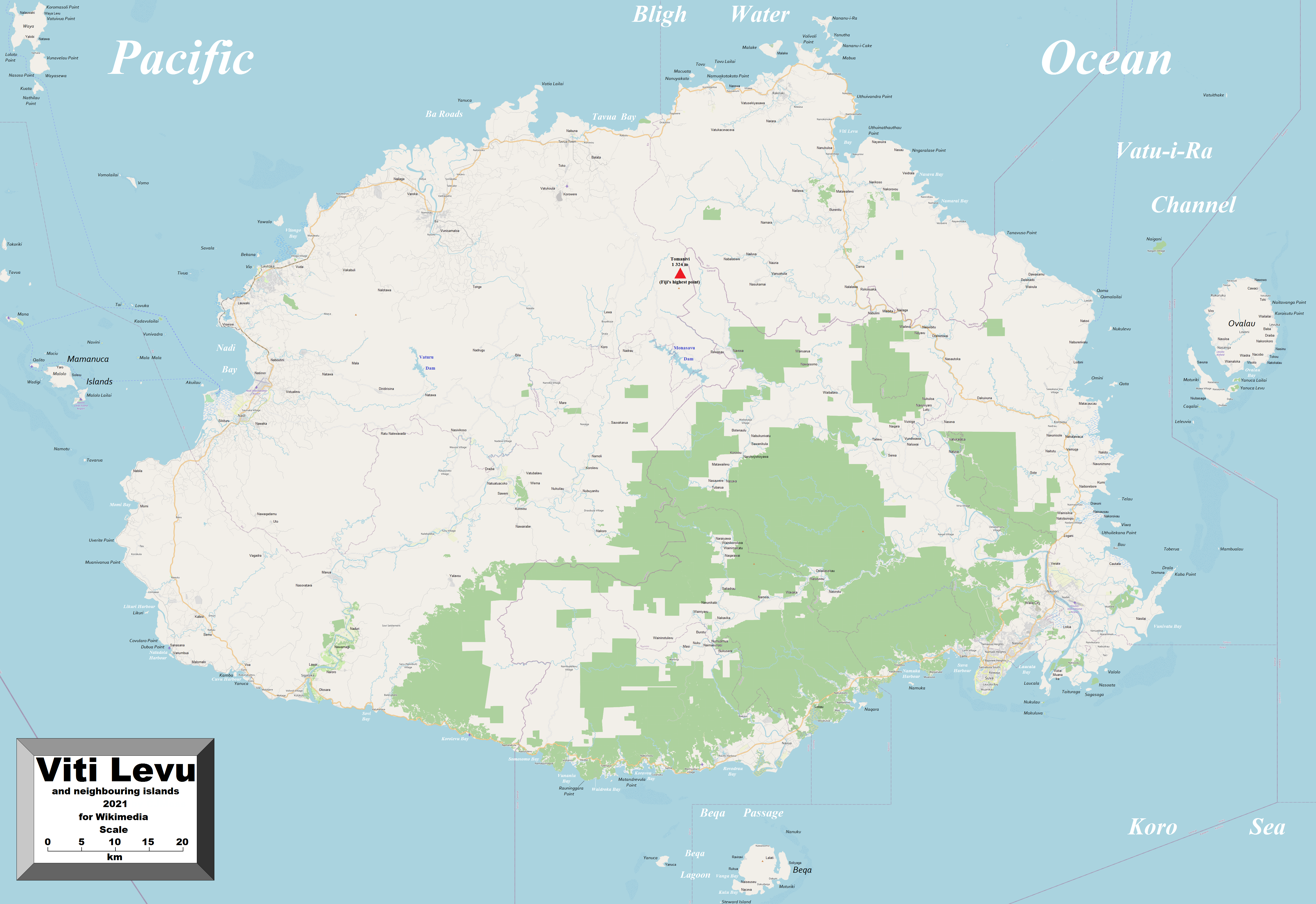
- Viti Levu with Dakuibeqa on Beqa off the south coast

- Location in Fiji
- Coordinates: 18°24′32.65″S 178°8′24.67″E
- Country: Fiji
- Island: Beqa
- Division: Central Division
- Province: Rewa
- Time zone: UTC+12

The Sawau (Fijian pronunciation: [saɰɔu̯]) tribe in Fiji is made of 6 villages on the island of Beqa, 10 kilometres (6.2 miles) to the south of Viti Levu, but the District is only made up of 5 villages. They are as follows:

- Dakuibeqa (Chiefly Village –Tui Sawau),
- Dakuni,
- Soliyaga,
- Naceva,
- Naseuseu and
- Rukua – (Part of the Tribe of Sawau but part of the District of Raviravi)

The people of Sawau are known for performing two cultural expressions:

- Vilavilairevo (Firewalking) The phenomena was examined in 1902 when it was already a tourist attraction, with a "Probable Explanation of the Mystery" arrived at.
- Yavirau or Qolikubu – (Fish drive)
