= Viti Levu Group =

Archipelago in Fiji

Coordinates: 18°23′34″S 177°47′40″E

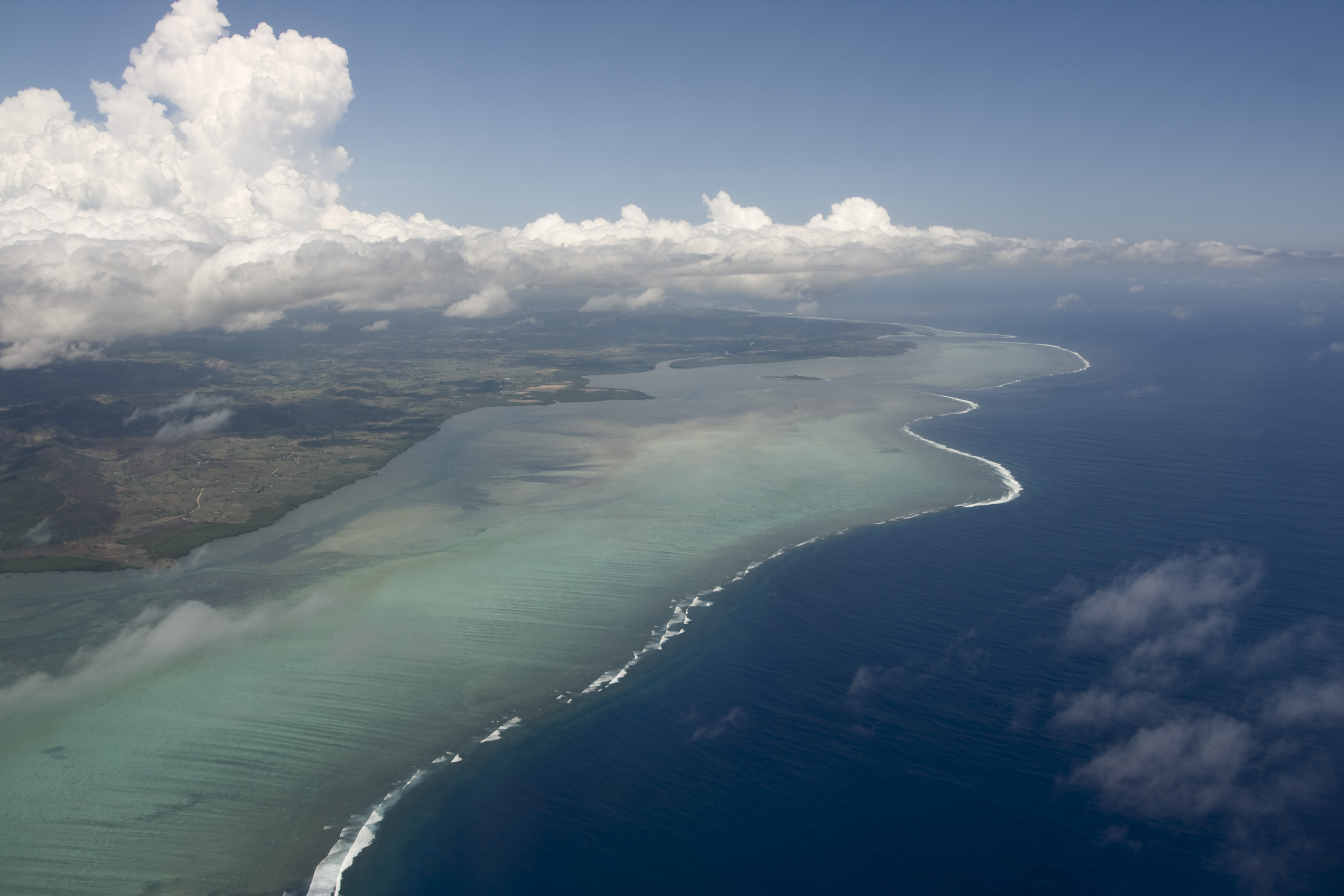
Viti Levu coast from the air

The Viti Levu Group is an archipelago in Fiji consisting Viti Levu island and its outlying islands.

== Geography ==
The group had an aggregate area of 10,453 square kilometres (4,036 sq mi), and a population of 574,801 at the 1996 census.

In 2001, Viti Levu itself accounted for 57% of the land area and 75% of the population of Fiji.

The outlying islands include:

- Bau
- Beqa
- Nukulau
- Vatulele

Several island groups close to Viti Levu, such as the Lomaiviti archipelago and Yasawa islands, could be considered outliers, but are usually classified as separate island chains in their own right.

== History ==
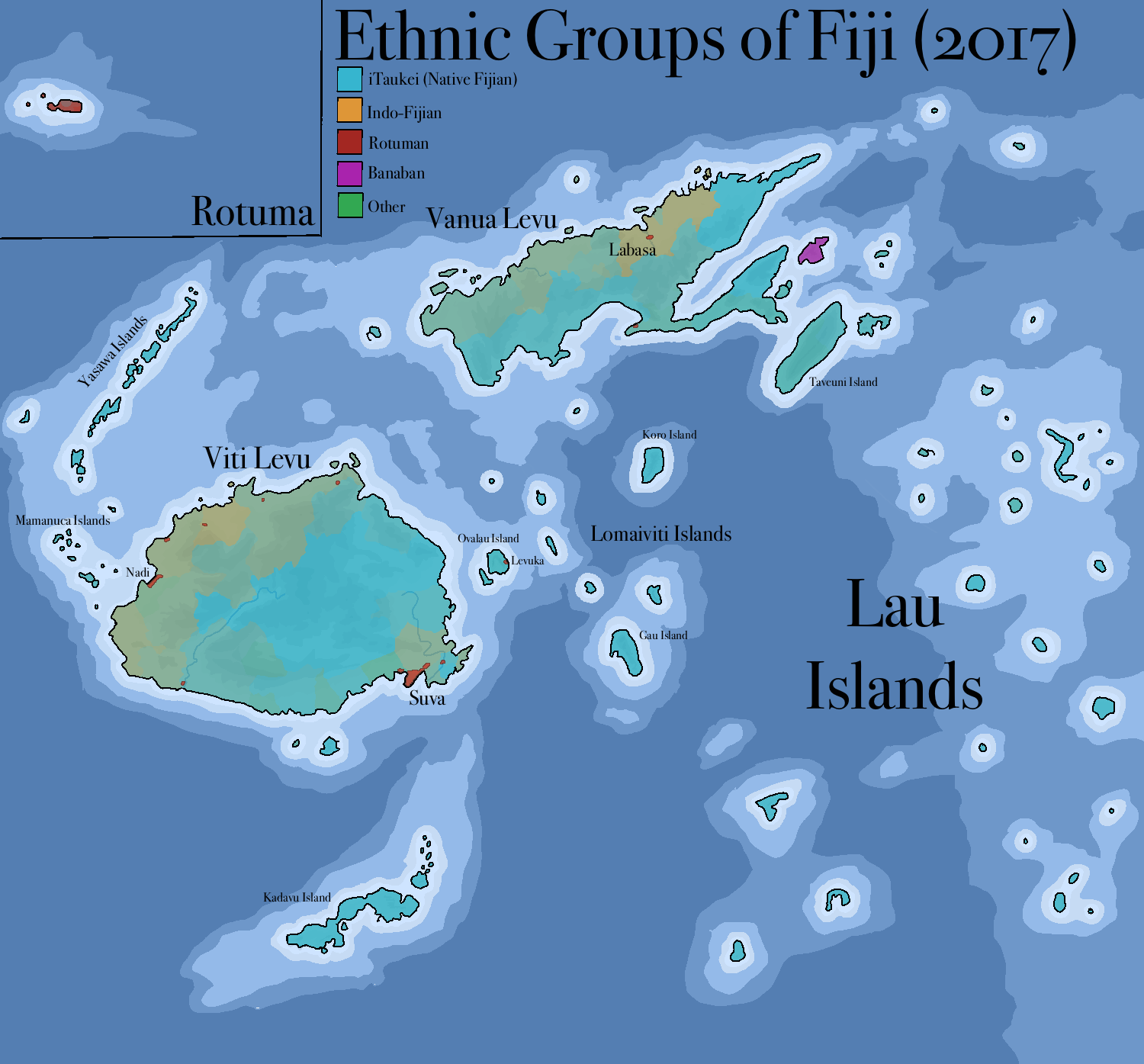
Viti Levu map

The islands have a long history of habitation by people of Polynesian and Melanesian descent. European missionaries and explorers visited the islands in the 18th and 19th centuries. In 1804 some escaped convicts from Australia, as well as runaway sailors, established themselves around the east part of Viti Levu, lending their services to the neighbouring chiefs of the islands. The islands were annexed to the United Kingdom in 1874. In 1970, the island group passed to Fiji on its independence from the UK.
