= Verata (district) =

District of Tailevu Province, Fiji

Verata is a tikina in Fiji's Tailevu Province. It is made up of several sub-districts or Tikina makawa, namely: Verata, Namalata, Tai, Vugalei, and Taivugalei. According to the 2017 census, the district had a population of 10,340 inhabitants.

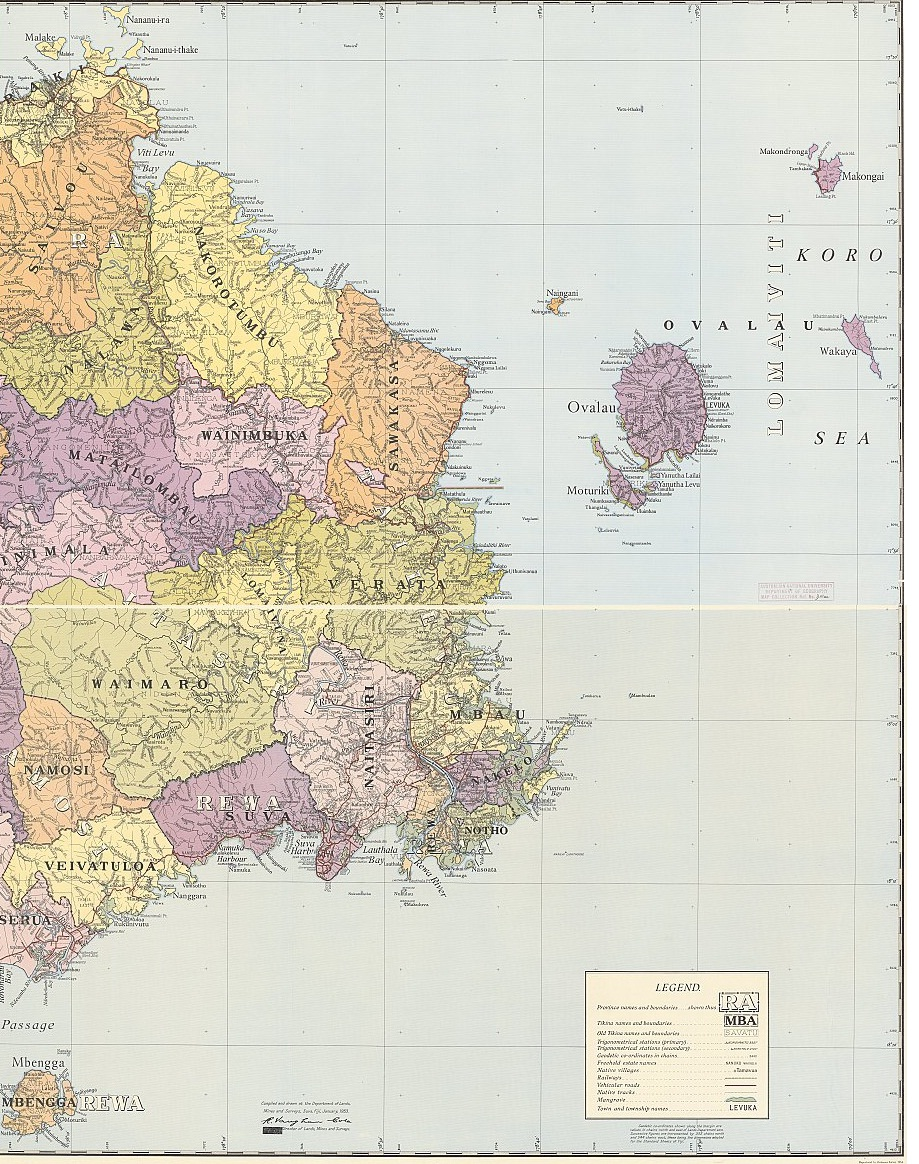
A Political Map of Eastern Viti Levu and adjacent islands, this image is the right half of an old Fiji Government map printed initially in 1953 by the Fiji Lands Department entitled "Viti Levu and Adjacent Islands - Colony of Fiji"

== Geography ==
Verata, Namalata, Tai, and Vugalei have both coastal areas as well as extensive inland undulating and rugged terrain, while Taivugalei is completely landlocked and much further inland of/border Verata and Namalata. Shellfish, Fish, coconut, taro, tapioca and a range of local vegetables and seafoods are the main trading merchandise.

== Chiefly Title ==
The traditional leader is the Na Bure Levu o Naisanokonoko, Nodra na Gone Turaga Bale, O Koya Na Ratu who traditionally is acknowledged as the most senior member of Fiji's tribal hereditary chiefs.

Fijian oral tradition holds that Fiji was settled by the legendary ancestral chief Lutunasobasoba. The first "Na Gone Turaga Bale O Koya Na Ratu" Rokomautu was said to be one of Lutunasobasoba's sons. Verata shares this distinction with the vanua of Rewa (Burebasaga), Bureta, Batiki, and Kabara whose ancestral chiefs were the children of Lutunasobasoba.

Most of the chiefly households on the Eastern half of Viti Levu as well all of Vanua Levu and Lau including Bau acknowledge either direct descent or some other strong connection to the vanua of Verata.

== History ==
The sub-districts are in themselves separate Vanua with their own chiefs, but the Vanua of Verata used to cover a much wider area.

In tribal Fiji, the power and therefore size of a vanua depended on the chief's ability to hold the "qali" or subject people, and to control the "bati" or border people. Bati is usually translated as warrior because they often were, but the literal meaning of "bati" in this sense is border (or edge). "Vanua/Yavusa Qali-tu" or subject peoples/tribes often rendered service only as long as the paramount chief was strong enough to enforce his rule. It is difficult to say with any precision how far Verata influence reached but at its zenith it was the pre-eminent vanua of ancient Fiji.

It was eventually eclipsed by the rise of Bau and the changing face of tribal war with the arrival of beachcombers and marooned sailors like the well-known Charles Savage who came to serve Bau much to Verata's disadvantage in 1808. In 1825, Bau had wrested from Verata, control of most of the island Ovalau including Levuka with the exception of Lovoni. Gau, Koro, Nairai and Batiki were soon to follow. By 1828, 20 years after the arrival of Savage, Ratu Naulivou (Vunivalu) had seized control of much of coastal eastern Viti Levu up to the delta of the Ba river. In 1829 Verata lost the allegiance of the powerful island and vanua of Viwa, who were to prove a vital role in the coming decades in the internecine conflicts. When Naulivou died later that year, he handed to his brother and successor Ratu Tanoa Visawaqa a powerful vanua whose only remaining rival was its closest ally the vanua of Rewa.

With the loss of Viwa, Verata lost all hope of ever regaining supremacy and lost the majority of engagements with Bau after 1829; Although, with the help of its own European, Matthew Riley, was able to hold onto what was left and even won a few skirmishes with the aid of various tactics and temporary alliances with Tui Cakau, Bau's ally and erstwhile reluctant vassal (from 25 September 1840–July 1841) and managed to attack Bau itself. Another notable example was 26 April 1850 when they soundly rebuffed an attempted Bauan raid in which the notorious Lasakau chief Ratu Gavidi was shot in the back and killed. Riley was given one of the chief's daughters and the island of Naigani in thanks and the island was settled by Riley, his young family and several families to serve as retainers to the young Adi and her children.

== Infrastructure and Development ==
Public infrastructure is less developed than in other districts in Fiji. The district is joined to other provinces by the Kings Road, one of the country's main highways, which recently has been tar-sealed for most of its length.

As with most rural development, projects are generally carried out on a communal basis with finance sourced from central and provincial government, aid donors and the people themselves locally as well as remittances from urban areas and those working abroad. Examples of projects are village pipe water system, power generation, village toilets and septic tanks, village meeting halls, nursing and health stations, schools and pre-school facilities.

Many landowning units are interested in developing their land commercially and whilst there are many options, capital is scarce.
