= Wakaya Island =

Privately owned island in Fiji

Wakaya
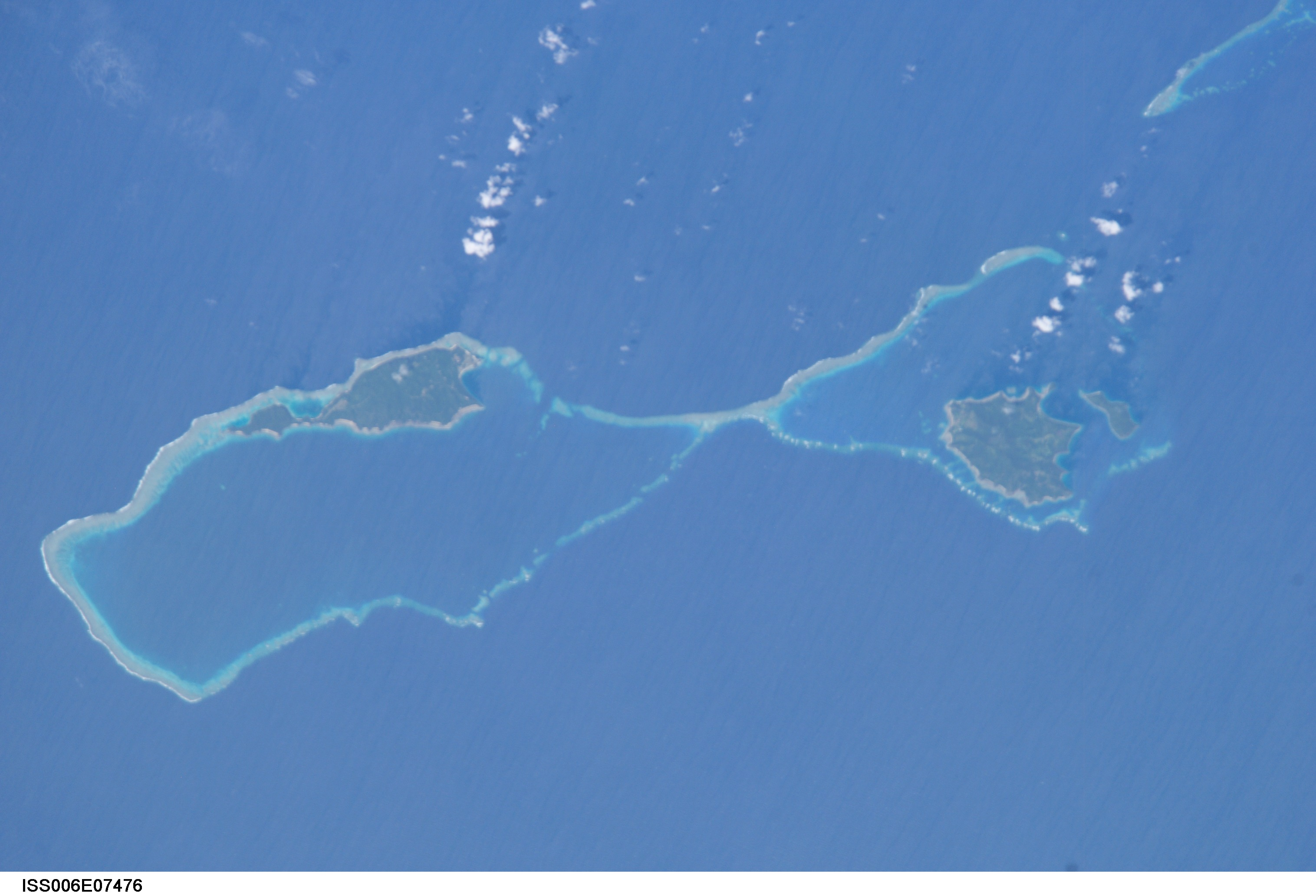
- The islands of Wakaya (left) and Makogai (right) as seen from space

- Location in Fiji

Geography
- Location: South Pacific Ocean
- Coordinates: 17°37′S 179°0′E
- Archipelago: Lomaiviti Islands
- Adjacent to: Koro Sea
- Area: 8 km^{2} (3.1 sq mi)
- Highest elevation: 181 m (594 ft)

Administration
- Fiji
- Division: Eastern Division
- Province: Lomaiviti
- District: Lomaiviti Other Islands
- Largest settlement: Wakaya Island Staff Village
Wakaya Marine Reserve
- IUCN category V (protected landscape/seascape)
- Interactive map of Wakaya Marine Reserve
- Location: Lomaiviti Archipelago, Fiji
- Nearest town: Levuka
- Coordinates: 17°37′S 179°0′E
- Area: 8 km^{2} (3.1 sq mi)
- Established: 20 February 2015

Wakaya (Note: Variously spelled in English during the first half of the 19th century, such as Vakkia, Ohokia, Volkkia, Vakia, and Wakaia.) is a privately owned island in Fiji's Lomaiviti Archipelago. Situated at 17.65° South and 179.02° East, it covers an area of 8 square kilometres (3.1 mi^{2}). It is 18 kilometres (11 mi) to the east of Ovalau, the main island in the Lomaiviti Group. Two other islands close to Wakaya are Makogai to the north, and Batiki to the south-east.

The coastal-marine ecosystem of the island contributes to its national significance as outlined in Fiji's Biodiversity Strategy and Action Plan. Since 1840, the island has been privately owned. In 1862, Wakaya became the site of the first attempt at commercial sugar production in Fiji. In the early 1940s, Wakaya was proposed as a new home for the Banabans. In 1973, Wakaya was purchased by businessman David Gilmour who also developed the island, building a resort, the Wakaya Club & Spa. In 2016, it was sold to the now-convicted Seagram's heiress Clare Bronfman who now owns most of the island.

== Geography ==
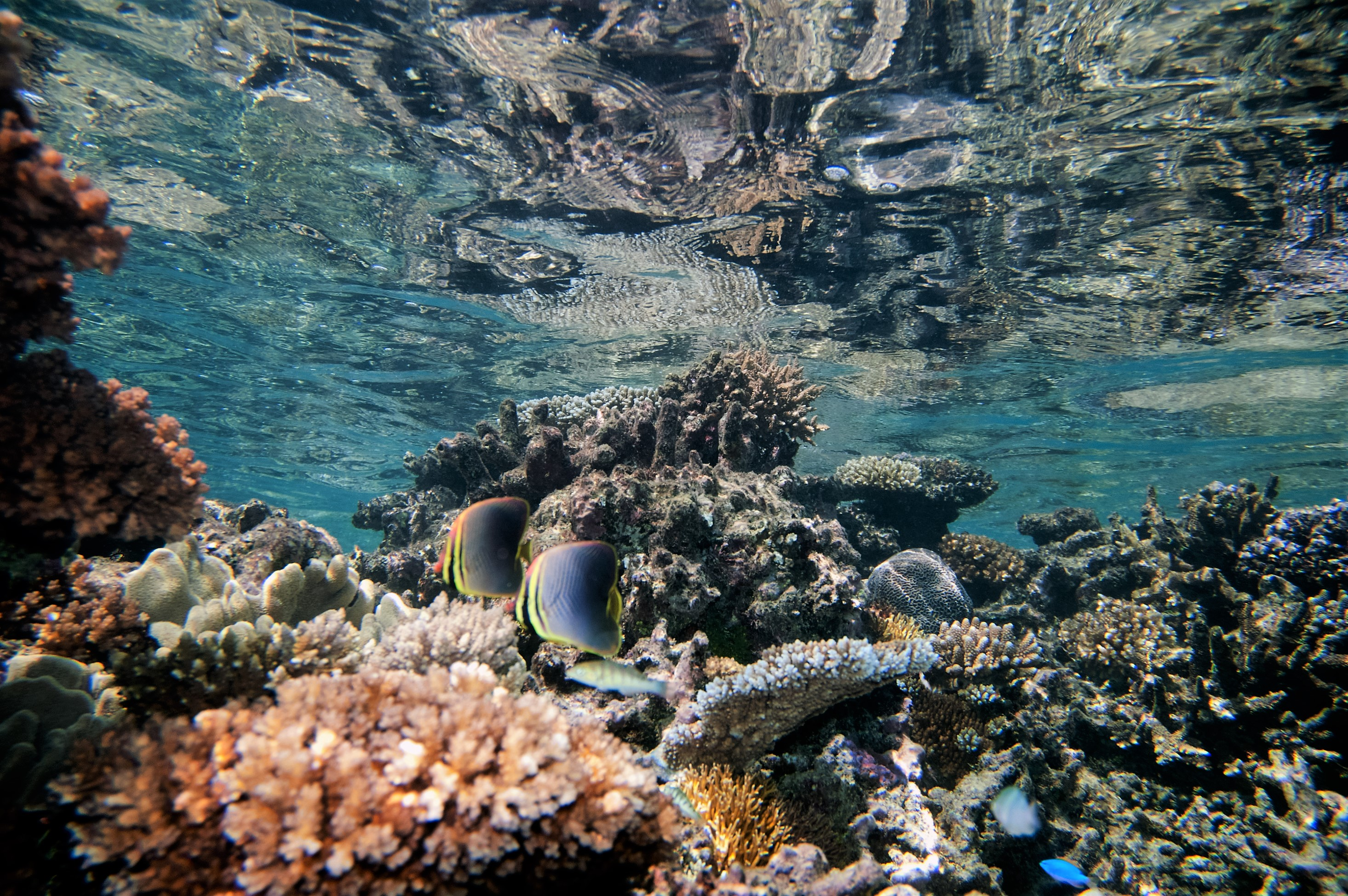
A pair of eastern triangle butterflyfish swimming on a shallow reef near Wakaya

The forested island of Wakaya is triangular in shape. The western side of the island is fringed by a reef, and the rest is surrounded by a barrier reef enclosing a deep lagoon. To the north is Davetanikaidraiba Passage; Wakaya is connected to the nearby island of Makogai by a narrow reef ridge. The highest point of the island is in the north at the height of 181 metres (594 ft), where there are steep cliffs. The southern part doesn't rise above 91.5 metres (300 ft) and is connected to the north by a comparatively low neck.

Deer were introduced to the island from New Zealand decades prior to 2009, having been there by 1973. As of 1973, there were also wild goats and pigs present. Peregrine falcons make their nests on the cliffs of the island. The invasive green iguanas, who had been accidentally introduced in the island of Qamea, have since spread to Wakaya and other islands.

In 2016, Cyclone Winston caused damage to nearby coral reefs and significant damage to the vegetation on Wakaya. Following the cyclone, a clam reintroduction and rehabilitation project was started in Wakaya and nearby Makogai later that year by the Ministry of Fisheries, as some species, such as the tevoro clam, had become locally extinct in Fiji due to being overharvested. Efforts were also being made by the ministry to conserve the endangered green turtle.

== History ==
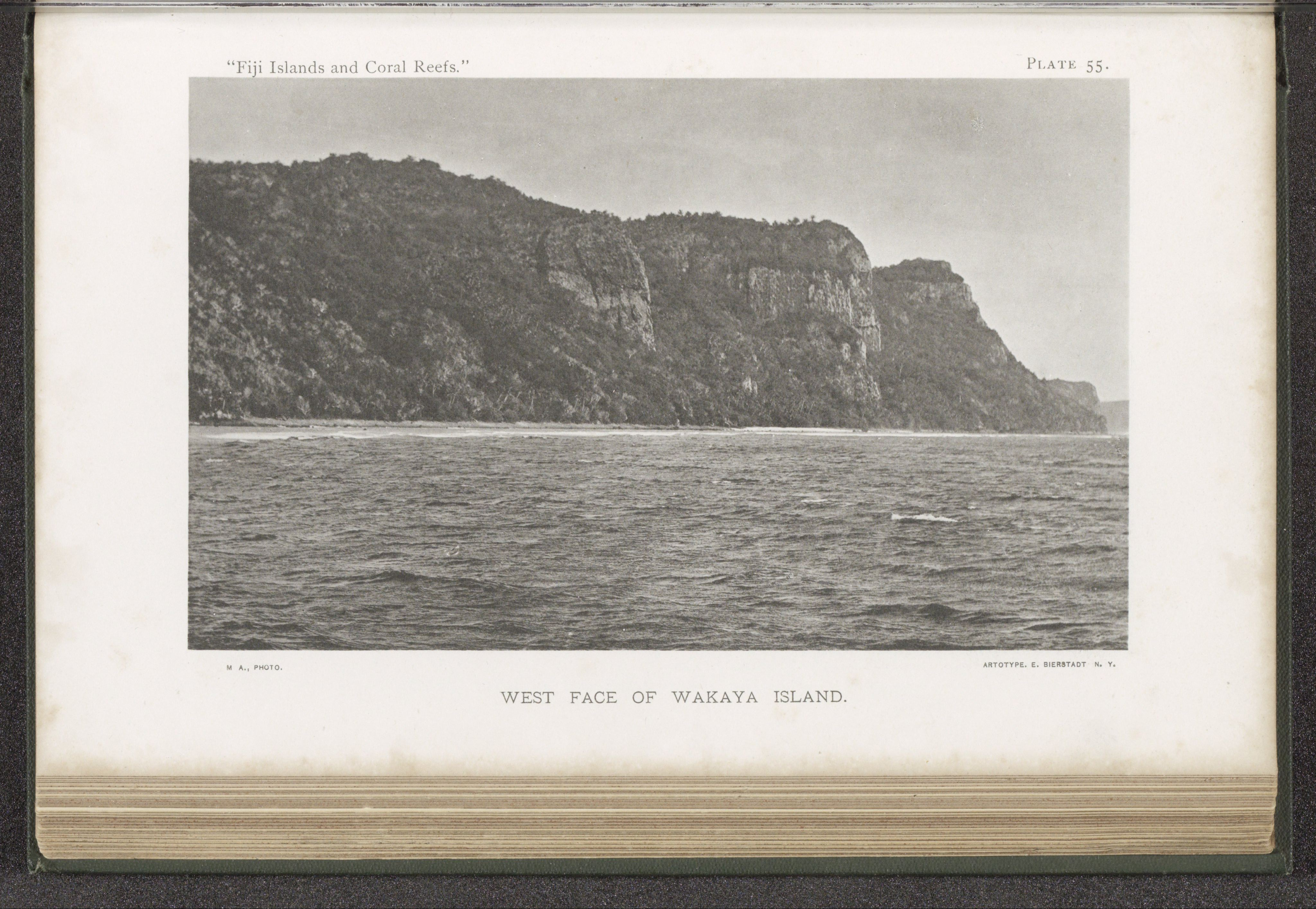
The west face of Wakaya island in the late 19th century

=== Prehistory ===
Beginning around 300 BC, Wakaya Island was inhabited by Pacific Islanders. There were two fortified sites on the island named Delaini and Korolevu, with the radiocarbon date of 500–300 calibrated years before present. Wakayan chiefs lived in Korolevu. In 1873, Commodore James Graham Goodenough of HMS Pearl investigated the site of a fort located on the highest point of the island, describing it as "a regular fort, with double ditch, nearly circular on top [...] the foundation of a temple (square) and a round foundation still stand". In 1964 and around 1992 fieldwork of the forts on Wakaya was carried out. As of 1994, pottery dating back four to five centuries prior had been found by archeologists.

=== Recorded history ===
On 6 May 1789, Captain William Bligh sailed past Wakaya on a small boat with men loyal to him, after the mutiny on the Bounty on 28 April, describing the island as "a little larger one" in his logbook. Upon seeing two large druas (war canoes), they retreated as quickly as possible, aided by a squall.

In 1837, roughly 800 warriors from the nearby island of Ovalau successfully attacked Wakaya. To avoid a gruesome death at the hands of the Ovalau warriors, the Wakayan chief jumped off a cliff on the western shore; that cliff edge is now called Chieftain's Leap in his honour. In December 1840, the ship Currency Lass arrived in Levuka on Ovalau, and Houghton, the ship's owner, bought the island of Wakaya from the chief of Ovalau, the Tui Levuka. The original inhabitants were removed in 1840, and since then, as of 1971, the island hadn't had more than a few plantation workers and their families living on it.

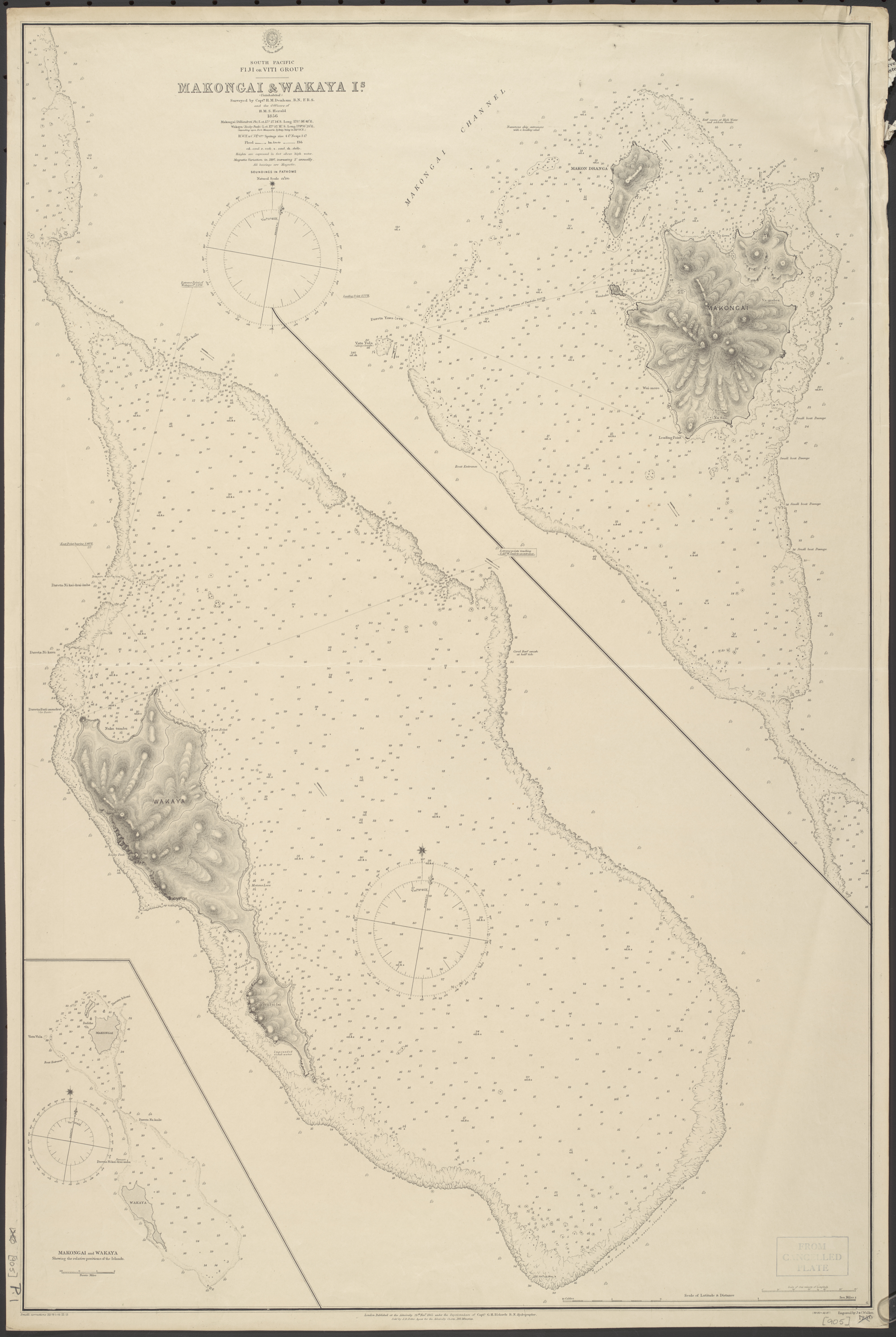
An 1856 nautical chart of Wakaya and Makogai islands

In the early 1860s, 10 Vanuatu men, who were stranded by a sandalwood ship, worked on a plantation on Wakaya. The first attempt at commercial sugar production in Fiji was by David Whippy on Wakaya Island in 1862, where he built a sugarcane mill, but this was a financial failure, as the island is small and not suited for growing sugarcane. Whippy was an American sailor and trader who first arrived in Fiji in 1824, and spent the later years of his life on Wakaya until his death in 1871. By 1870, the island was owned by the former American Consul in Fiji, Isaac Mills Brower, who had a homestead with livestock on Wakaya; cotton and coffee plantations were also present at the time. He left Fiji in 1876. In 1877, the island was bought by Captain Frederick Lennox Langdale (1853–1913), a former Royal Navy officer, who later served on the Legislative Council of Fiji before being appointed governor's commissioner at Cakaudrove to the north, a position he resigned from around 1909. Langdale had a Tudor-style house on the island by 1899; a few years after 1907, it was completely destroyed in a storm that also killed four Fijians. In the late 1890s, Langdale also became the manager of the coconut plantations on Rabi Island, at the offer of Pacific Islands Company Ltd.

On 21 September 1917, during World War I, German naval officer Felix von Luckner and his party were arrested at Wakaya by a group from the Fijian constabulary consisting of a British officer and four Indian soldiers. Previously that year, Luckner had been raiding Entente ships as the commander of SMS Seeadler, but the ship wrecked on Mopelia island in French Polynesia during a storm, causing Luckner and five of his men to flee on a boat with the goal of capturing a vessel and returning for the rest of the crew. Armed with machine guns and rifles, and posing as Norwegians, they visited the Cook Islands and set off towards Fiji.

In early 1920 the coconut estates on Wakaya and Naitaba suffered a heavy loss due to a storm. On 11–12 January 1930 a tropical cyclone impacted the Fijian islands of Makogai, Wakaya and Gau, where it caused a moderate amount of damage. In 1930, the roughly seven month-long construction of the Wakaya lighthouse on the Wakaya reef was finished. The reef is located 4.8 kilometres (3 mi) from Wakaya island. The lighthouse is of reinforced concrete and has a height of 21.5 metres (70.5 ft) above the reef level.

=== Banaban proposal ===
In the early 1940s, the Banabans proposed the acquisition of Wakaya as a new home for themselves, as their home island of Banaba was being exploited for phosphate by the British, thereby destroying it. At that time Wakaya was owned by Wakaya Ltd, (Note: The executor of the late R.B.S. Watson's will owned most of the company's shares.) who agreed to sell it "if a reasonable offer was made". Colonial authorities surveyed the island, concluding it to be unsuitable for resettlement due to the soil being shallow and the water supply being poor. Levers Pacific Plantations Pty Ltd offered to sell Rabi Island in northern Fiji in October 1941. After a series of telegrams between the islanders and the British, in March 1942, the majority of Banabans agreed to a compromise where both Wakaya and Rabi were to be purchased. The Western Pacific High Commission couldn't agree on a price with the owners of Wakaya, so only Rabi Island was purchased in March with money from the Banaban Provident Fund.

=== Purchase by David Gilmour and subsequent development ===
By 1969 the island was a coconut plantation, (Note: The Estate Manager isn't named in the 1971 Robinson paper. The Wakaya Club resort was later built on the site of a former coconut plantation.) and there were 10 labourers and their families living on the island. Businessman David Gilmour saw the island from an airplane, and his hotel chain Southern Pacific Hotels Corporation shortly bought it in 1973 for $600,000. Since the island was uninhabited, Gilmour decided to repopulate Wakaya and build a resort on it. Despite the purchase of the hotel chain by the Singaporean banker Tan Sri Khoo Teck Puat in 1981, the island of Wakaya remained separately owned by Gilmour and his business partners. Gilmour eventually bought the island for himself from two business partners in 1987.

At least $13 million were spent on the development of the island, which included the construction of a freshwater reservoir, an airstrip, a golf course, jetty, village, church, and a school. Gilmour also developed the Wakaya Club & Spa, an exclusive resort opened in 1990 and built in the 1990s. The resort has 10 luxury bures (bungalows), including the Governor's Bure and the Ambassador's Bure, which are grander than the rest. It also houses a large private villa called Vale O (House in the Clouds), which was built in the 1990s. As of 2002, the Wakaya Club resort had 60 full-time employees, 34 of whom were customer-facing, and all of whom were Fijian. Starting in the early 1980s, Wakaya was managed by the married couple of Rob and Lynda Miller for 28 years.

=== Change of ownership ===
Wakaya was devastated by Cyclone Winston in early 2016. Later that year, the majority of Wakaya Island (80%) was sold to Seagram's heiress Clare Bronfman, who was convicted in 2019 of financing a human trafficking ring known as NXIVM. She was sentenced to 6 years and 9 months in September 2020. As of 2018, the Resort Civil and Grounds Manager was Niumaia Niumataiwalu. In 2022, the American tourism marketing company Pacific Storytelling partnered with the Wakaya Club & Spa resort. In 2023, Monika Pal was appointed as the general manager of the resort, having previously been a manager since 2016.

== Demographics ==
The original inhabitants were removed in 1840, and the island became privately owned. Since then, as of 1971, the island had not had more than a few plantation workers and their families living on it. For example, in the early 1860s, 10 Vanuatu men worked on a plantation on Wakaya, and by 1969 the island was a coconut plantation, with 10 labourers and their families living on the island. As of 2002, the Wakaya Club resort had 60 full-time employees, 34 of whom were customer-facing, and all of whom were Fijian. The list of all polling venues for the 2018 Fijian general election recorded Wakaya Island Staff Village as having 161 voters, and the list for the 2022 general election had 87 voters in the village.

== Transport ==
There is a private aerodrome on the island operated by ACK Management PTE Ltd. Its IATA airport code is KAY and its ICAO airport code is NFNW. As of 1982, there was a 734 metres (2,408 ft) long airstrip. The airline Air Wakaya had come into existence by 1991 and operated a 1992 Britten Norman Islander by 2002. The airline began operating a Cessna 208 Caravan sometime during 2003–2005. It now owns an 11-seat plane, the Cessna 208 Grand Caravan EX, which it acquired in 2013. Flights are done from Nadi Airport to Wakaya.

There are also unpaved roads and a jetty.

== Notable people ==
Former owner David Gilmour and his wife Jill used to live on Wakaya Island four months a year. Since the development of the Wakaya Club on the island, some famous people have stayed at the resort, including King Felipe VI of Spain (then a Prince) and his wife Letizia, Nicole Kidman and her husband Keith Urban, Bill Gates and his wife Melinda, Steve Jobs, Rupert Murdoch, George Lucas, Michelle Pfeiffer, David E. Kelley, Robert Zemeckis, Paris Hilton, Tom Cruise, and Keith Richards (who was hospitalised after falling from a coconut tree).

== In popular culture ==
Sections of the 1983 pirate adventure film Nate and Hayes (also known as Savage Islands) were filmed on Wakaya.
