= Makogai =

Island in Fiji

Coordinates: 17°27′S 178°58′E

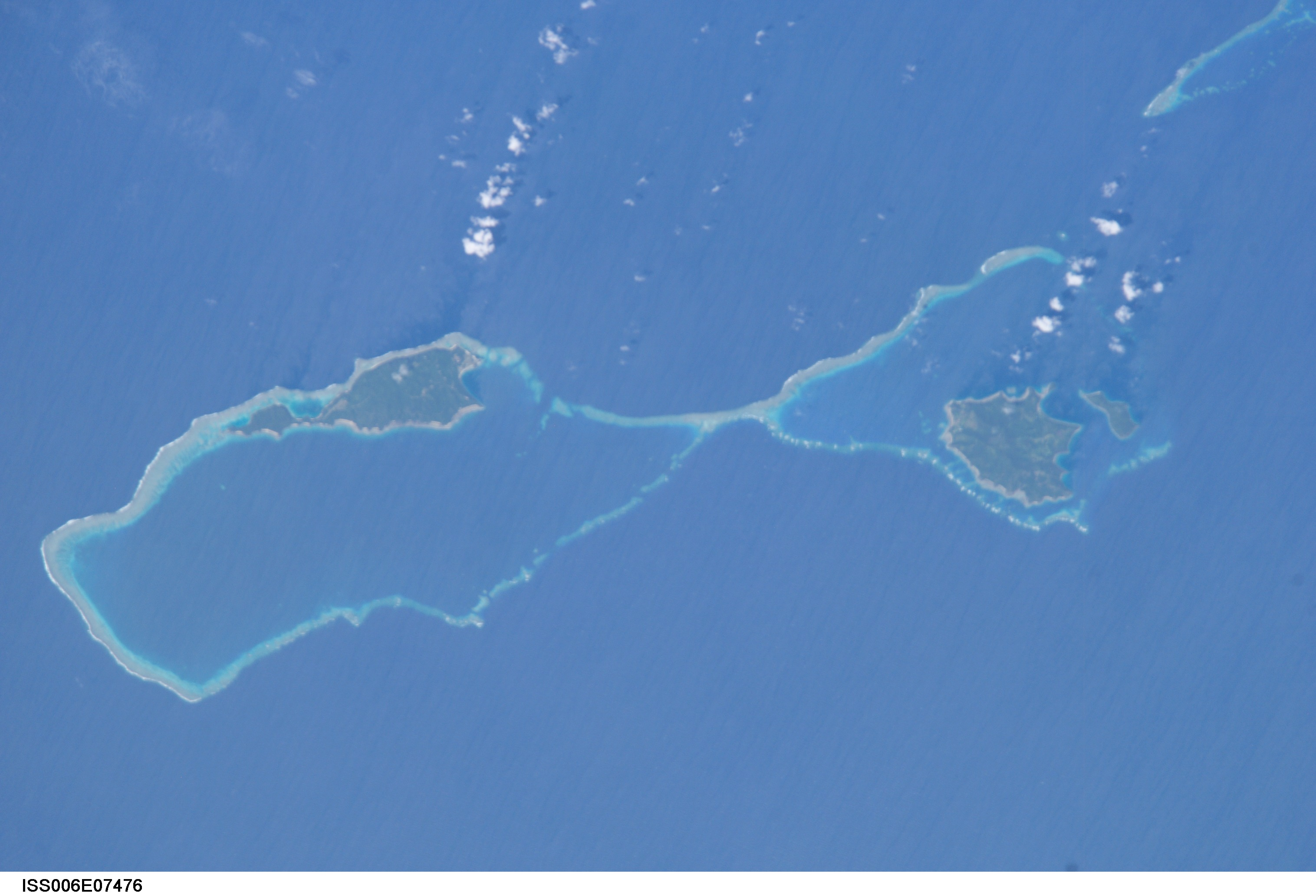
- The islands of Wakaya (left) and Makogai (right) as seen from space

- Location in Fiji

Geography
- Archipelago: Lomaiviti Islands
- Adjacent to: Koro Sea
- Area: 8.4 km^{2} (3.2 sq mi)
- Highest elevation: 267 m (876 ft)

Administration
- Fiji
- Division: Eastern Division
- Province: Lomaiviti
- District: Lomaiviti Other Islands

Makogai (Fijian pronunciation: [makoˈŋai], also known as Makongai in English) is an island belonging to Fiji's Lomaiviti Archipelago. Covering an area of 8.4 square kilometres (2,100 acres), it is situated at 17.27° South and 178.58° East. It has a maximum altitude of 267 metres (876 ft) on two peaks in the centre. Makogai is visible from Ovalau. To the south is Wakaya Island.

The beach forest, cycad dominated, and coastal/marine ecosystem of the island and its surrounding reef contribute to its national significance as outlined in Fiji's Biodiversity Strategy and Action Plan.

Captain William Bligh (formerly of HMS Bounty) passed between the islands of Koro and Makogai in early May 1789, becoming the first European to discover them.

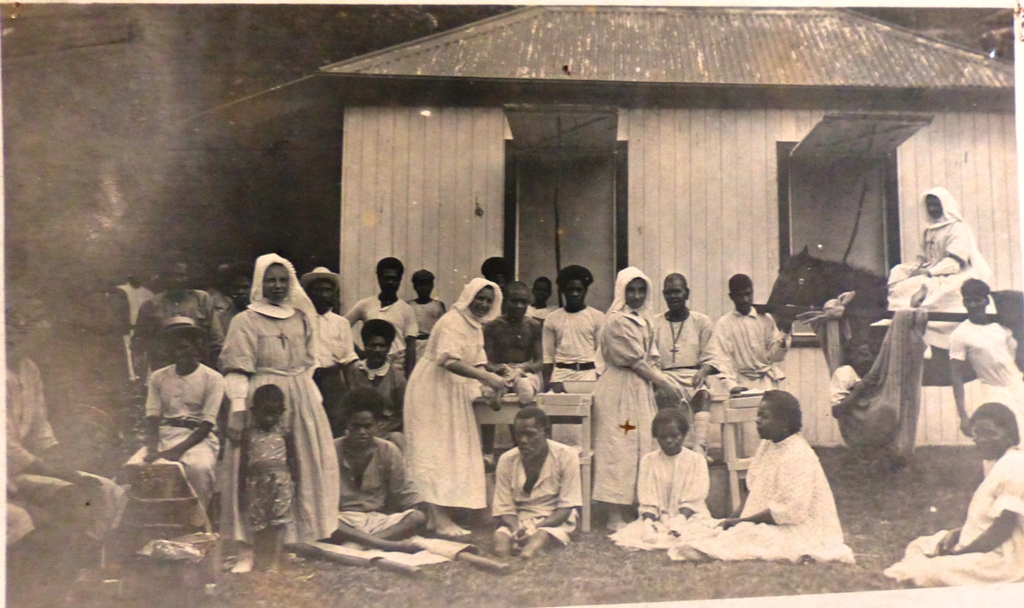
Sisters and lepers of Makogai

The island used to house a leper colony owned by the colonial government of Fiji with the help of the Missionary Sisters of the Society of Mary. The number of patients grew from 40 when the leprosarium opened in 1911 to 700 in 1950. They were nursed by Catholic sisters. Mother Mary Agnes was the superior of the lepers colony from 1916 until 1950. Patients came from other British colonies in the Pacific as well as from the various territories of the Dominion of New Zealand after 1922.

Patients who were not residing at the hospital were living in villages organized by ethnicity, each community being allowed to keep their traditions and religious practices. As part of occupational therapy, patients were expected to grow food, fish, do craft work or graze cattle. The leprosarium was renowned internationally as a model of discipline and social peace even though the Fijian government imposed a racial hierarchy on the island resulting in white people receiving more rations than non-white. The Fijian government was charging accommodation fees to the various governments sending lepers depending on the race of the patient. Fees were higher for whites, lower for Chinese, Indians and Maori and a lot lower for Pacific islanders. The leper colony operated until the 1960s.

The Makogai Mariculture Research Centre and residential buildings had been destroyed by Cyclone Winston in 2016, so a new research centre was opened in 2019. In early 2019, the Ministry of Fisheries announced a ban on the usage of plastic bags on the island, and declared it a marine protected area.

== See also ==
- List of islands
