= Nabuna =

- Village
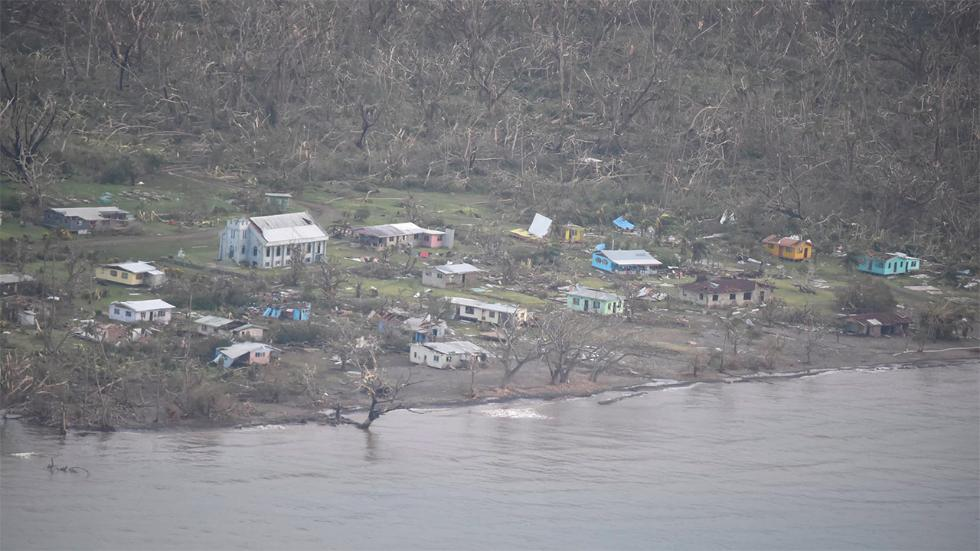
- Damage to Nabuna after Cyclone Winston

- Location in Fiji
- Country: Fiji
- Island: Koro
- Division: Eastern Division
- Province: Lomaiviti
- Time zone: UTC+12

Nabuna (Fijian pronunciation: [nambuna]) is a small village on the northern side of Koro Island in Fiji. It consists of approximately 60 dwellings with further dwellings in sub-settlements just to the south and east. It is connected to the rest of the island by one road running east and south connecting to the ferry jetty on the southern tip of Koro Island and other villages to the east and south. There is also a small little used track running to the east towards the two resorts on the island.

The village is populated by Fijians with a single church in the center of the village with a large grass area in front of the church facing north and to the seaside. The whole village is at sea level, built right up to the shore line. Water is supplied to the village by means of a pipe running from a catchment area up the hills in the south. A small creek is running along the eastern side of the village making a boundary. Mains power is supplied by a diesel generator which is run at set times in the evening. Villages have access to supplies by means of small village "canteen's" which bring in supplies from Suva on the mainland. The main industry is growing and supplying Kava and Taro to the mainland, shipped usually once a week. Other form of income for the villages is tourists who arrive from time to time in private boats and shown traditional dancing and drinking yaqona (a drink made from Kava).

In 2016 severe tropical cyclone Winston came through to the north and impacted Nabuna severely, most dwellings destroyed or severely damaged. Even the church sustained damage. According to reports 12 people from Nabuna were injured during this event. Others remain in shelters while the Fijian Government, with assistance from Australian, New Zealand, Chinese and other nation's aid relief are shipped to the island.
