= Vuaqava =

Island in Lau Islands, Fiji

Coordinates: 18°52′S 178°54′W

Geography
- Location: South Pacific Ocean
- Archipelago: Lau Islands
- Adjacent to: Koro Sea
- Area: 8.1 km^{2} (3.1 sq mi)
- Highest elevation: 107 m (351 ft)

Administration
- Fiji
- Division: Eastern Division
- Province: Lau Province
- District: Kabara

Demographics
- Population: 0

Additional information
- Time zone: FJT (UTC+12)
  - Summer (DST): FJST (UTC+13)

Vuaqava (pronounced [βuaŋˈɡaβa]) is an outlier to Kabara, 5 kilometers to the SSW, in Fiji's Southern Lau Group. It occupies an area of 8.1 km^{2}. This limestone island has a maximum altitude of 107 meters. The island is uninhabited but visited by fishermen.

The limestone belongs to the Koroqara Limestone (Tokalau Limestone Group) and is probably Late Miocene in age. It is mostly fragmental in nature but true reef occurs along much of the south coast. The interior basin is occupied by the largest lake in Fiji, area 121 ha. There is an emerged notch 1 m above lake level.

== See also ==
- Desert island
- List of islands
