= Taufa Vakatale =

Fijian politician (1938–2023)

Deputy Prime Minister of Fiji
- In office August 1997 – 1999
- Prime Minister: Sitiveni Rabuka

Personal details
- Born: 23 June 1938
- Died: 24 June 2023

Mereia Taufa Vakatale, O.F. (1 February 1938 – 24 June 2023) was a Fijian politician and educator. She served in the Cabinet of Fiji under the Soqosoqo ni Vakavulewa ni Taukei (SVT) during 1993–1995 and 1997–1999. In 1997, she became Fiji's first female Deputy Prime Minister.

== Biography ==
Taufa Vakatale was born on 1 February 1938 on Batiki in the Lomaiviti Islands. Her parents were Alanieta Naucukidi and Mosese Vakatale, a Methodist minister. She attended primary school on Gau Island before enrolling in the first cohort of students at Adi Cakobau School, a government boarding school for girls on Fiji's main island, Viti Levu, in 1948. She received the New Zealand School Certificate in 1954. Three years later, she became the first indigenous Fijian girl to pass the New Zealand University Entrance examination and upon graduating from the University of Auckland in 1963, the first Fijian woman to receive a Bachelor of Arts degree.

Vakatale returned to her boarding school, Adi Cakobau, as a teacher. She was the school principal from 1973 from 1979, making her the first indigenous Fijian woman to serve as a secondary school principal. She left the school to become a diplomat in 1980 and became the first indigenous Fijian woman appointed a deputy high commissioner. She held various positions in the civil service, particularly in the field of education, and became Chief Education Officer in 1983.

Vakatale left the civil service in 1990. She ran for election in 1992 under the Soqosoqo ni Vakavulewa ni Taukei (SVT) party ticket; she was elected and won a bid for re-election in 1994. Her win in 1992 made her the first Fijian woman elected as a cabinet minister. She was Minister of Education, Science and Technology from 1993 to 1995, but she was dismissed from her cabinet post in 1995 because, in contrast to the SVT's policies, she opposed French nuclear weapons testing in Moruroa Atoll in French Polynesia. In 1997, she was appointed Deputy Prime Minister and Minister of Education and Technology, and in 1999 she became the first female president of the SVT. Vakatale resigned from the SVT in 2000 in opposition to the coup d'état by i-Taukei nationalists which had removed then-Prime Minister Mahendra Chaudhry from power.

After retiring from politics, Vakatale worked in the private education sector. She was made an Officer of the Order of Fiji in 1996 and was awarded an honorary Doctor of Letters degree by the University of St Andrews in 2009. In 2012, she was selected as a member of the Constitutional Commission headed by Yash Ghai.

Vakatale died on 24 June 2023, at the age of 85.
