= Manchukuo Police =

The Manchukuo Police was the main law enforcement agency of Manchukuo in what is today China.

== Background and foundation ==
When the Fengtian Clique ruled Manchuria, they had a police system that was legally part of the Republic of China Police but acted independently. After the Japanese Empire invaded Manchuria and established Manchukuo, a new system was established under the control of Japan. A central police department was established to be responsible for all police in Manchuria.

In each province, police headquarters were set up, like Xinjing's Metropolitan Police Office and the Fengtian City Police.

A Maritime Police was also set up to combat smuggling.

== History ==
- March 1932:the Manchukuo Police Forces were established.
- June 1932:the Xinjing Metropolitan Police Department was established.
- March 1934:Puyi was formally declared as Emperor.
- March 1937:the Manchukuo Police were put under the authority of the Manchukuo Ministry of Public Security.
- December 1937:Extraterritoriality over Japan is abolished.
- December 1939:A police code of conduct is enacted.
- October 1943:"General Directorate of Security Affairs" is established to replace the Manchukuo Ministry of Public Security.
- August 1945:Manchukuo Police was dissolved.

== Police code ==
In December 1939, the Manchukuo Police Code of Conduct was established as a code of conduct for all police officers .

- Police officers should be the forerunners of the Kingly Way.
- Police officers should be the core of national harmony.
- Police officers must be men of valor and uphold justice.
- Police officers must be disciplined and harmonious.
- Police officers are supposed to act with integrity and responsibility
- Police officers should be honourable, impartial, and selfless.
- Police officers should strive to self-improve their personalities.

== Maritime Police ==
As a subordinate organization of the Manchukuo Police, its main task was to crack down on smuggling and maintain maritime security. Although the name of the police force is used, the Imperial Japanese Navy were deeply involved since the very beginning and trained its officers. During the middle of World War II, the Japanese Navy took over the cost of the transport of goods. In addition, half of the maritime police officers were Japanese seconded from the Imperial Japanese Navy.

=== Historical background ===
Before the establishment of Manchukuo, the naval force of the Fengtian Clique was called the Northeast Fleet and possessed a total of 21 ships.

However, after the outbreak of the Manchurian Incident, the Northeast Fleet fled to the Nanjing Nationalist Government. There was virtually no organization to guard the territorial waters of the Bohai and Yellow seas.

After the establishment of Manchukuo, the government decided to establish a maritime police agency with the cooperation of the Japanese Navy (the naval department in Manchuria), and a coastal surveillance police unit was established.

In 1932, the Coast Guard Police Force was renamed the Coastal Police Force in accordance with the "Special Police Force Officer System" (Order No. 33 of the Kangde 1). Later, in 1938, the first stage of the plan was formulated, and the construction and purchase of new vessels was promoted. The headquarters was set up in Yingkou.

In 1937, the special police force officer system was abolished and the coastal police force was reorganized into a new marine police force.

In 1938 (Kangde 5), the maritime police were transferred to the coastal counties.

=== Organization ===
As of 1943 (10th year of Kangde):

- Police HQ
  - Police, Security, Education, Personnel, Secret Service, Management and Administration.
- Department of Shipping
  - Ship administration, machinery administration
- Aviation Unit
- Guard ship Unit
- Training Unit
- Koro Island Wireless Telegraph Station
- Daito Wireless Telegraph Station
- Shogawa Wireless Telegraph Office

== Ranks ==
Manchukuo Police Rank	Current Japanese Police Rank
Commissioner of Police (jǐngwùsīzhǎng) (警務司長)	Commissioner General
Superintendent General (shǒudūjǐngchátīngzhǎng) (首都警察廳長)	Superintendent General
Senior Commissioner (Jǐngchátīngcìzhǎng) (警察廳次長)	Senior Commissioner
Chief Commissioner (jǐngzhèngzǒngzhǎng) (警正總長)	Commissioner
Police Commissioner (jǐngzhèng) (警正)	Assistant Commissioner
Police Superintendent (jǐngzuǒ)(警佐)	Superintendent
Police Officer (jǐngwèi) (警尉)	Chief Inspector
Assistant Police Officer (jǐngwèibǔ) (警尉補)	Inspector
Police Sergeant (jǐngzhǎng) (警長)	Sergeant
Police Officer (jǐngshì) (警士)	Officer

== Uniforms ==
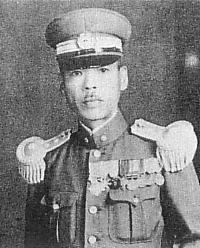
Dress Uniform

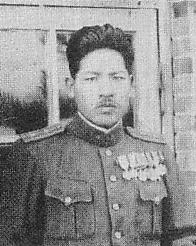
Duty Uniform
