= Batiki =

- Island and Tikina
- Location in Fiji
- Coordinates: 17°47′S 179°09′E
- Country: Fiji
- Island group: Lomaiviti Islands
- Division: Eastern Division
- Province: Lomaiviti
- District: Batiki

Area
  - Total: 12 km^{2} (4.6 sq mi)
- Highest elevation: 186 m (610 ft)

Population (2017)
  - Total: 216
  - Density: 18/km^{2} (47/sq mi)

Batiki (Fijian pronunciation: [ᵐbaˈtʃiki], also known as Mbatiki in English) is an island of Fiji belonging to the Lomaiviti Archipelago. The island is of volcanic origin, with a land area of about 12 square kilometers. To the north-east is Wakaya Island, to the east is Nairai, and to the south-east is Gau.

Batiki's population of approximately 300 Fijians lives in coastal villages. The economic activity of the island consists of farming and fishing.

There are four villages on the island: Manuku, Mua, Naigani, and Yavu. Mua village is home to the residence of the chief, island pastor, the health clinic center, a single flat-primary school building with a boarding facility and playground.

== Geography ==
Batiki has a large interior lagoon of brackish water flanked by mud flats. A broad barrier reef surrounds Batiki with a channel in Nakasava on the north side of the island. A small portion of the coastal area is covered by mangroves, mainly in Wainiketei Bay.

— Watisoni Lalavanua, Ilisoni Tuinasavusavu and Peni Seru, The status of the sea cucumber fishery in Batiki District, Lomaiviti, Fiji (2014)

The presence of nests of the critically endangered hawksbill sea turtle has been recorded on the island.

== History ==
The island was devastated by Cyclone Winston in 2016, with Naigani village being affected the most. The high chief of Batiki since January 2012, Torau Ni Bau Ratu Inoke Tuidelaibatiki Virivirilau, died on 4 February 2017.

== Demographics ==
Batiki had a population of 324 people as of the 1966 census, and 483 as of the 2007 census. At the most recent census in 2017, Batiki had a population of 216.

== Economy ==
The main source of income is from copra, pandanus (Fijian: voivoi), small-scale farming, and fishing, with fish being sold to the markets in Suva. There is a sea cucumber fishery, which mainly involves male youths. By 1987 a commercial seaweed farm was established on Batiki. As of 2009 there were 42 farms on Batiki, with a total area of 13 hectares.

Another important source of income for the locals is the Bula Batiki coconut oil firm, whose products are made from the island's bountiful coconut palms. This business was started in 2015 by a British man named Callum Drummond, known as Kelevi by the islanders, when he won a grant from Cardiff University for the project. The two other co-founders are Ellis Williams and Tim McKee. In 2020 a coconut oil processing plant designed by CAUKIN Studio was built at Yavu village.

== Infrastructure ==
There is a primary school on the island, Manuku District School, with 71 students as of 2016 and 4 teachers. There is also a nursing station at Mua village staffed by a registered nurse. Critical cases are referred either to Qarani Health Centre or Levuka Hospital. The nursing station opening hours are from 8:00 am to 4:30 pm on a daily basis, but it is also on standby after hours in case of emergencies.

The island has no airport or roads, so most transport is by local cargo vessels, small fibreglass boats, or via a shipping franchise that services the Lomaiviti archipelago on a monthly basis.

== Notable people ==
- Taufa Vakatale (1938–2023), politician and educator.
