= Tora ni Bau =

There are three confederacies in the Fijian Traditional Government, Kubuna, Tovata and Burebasaga. One of the two Paramount chiefly tribes in the Kubuna Confederacy is the "ToraniBau" the other (Vunivalu of Bau)

The first known documented and installed Tora ni Bau was Ratu Virivirilau who was installed in Delai Batiki Kubuna Bau . Seven other Tora ni Bau were also installed and resided in Tailevu along the eastern coast of Viti Levu. The following eight holders of the Tora ni Bau title relocated and resided in the chiefly island of Batiki in the Lomaiviti province.

The traditional Tora ni Bau lineage was empowered by the strong traditional ties of warriors (Bati) which included the chiefly tribes of Waimaro in the Naitasiri province, including other warrior tribes along the coast of Tailevu and Ra. From the Lomaiviti province, warrior (Bati) linkages were led by the warrior clans of Sawaieke in Gau, and Cawa in Koro island. Traditional protocol between some Chiefs and warriors (Bati), is the Chief's abstinence of consumption of fish in the presence of warriors, and the abstinence of pork for the warriors in the presence of their chiefs. This is still somewhat practiced today, and was also one of the reasons the eighth Tora ni Bau, Ratu Isireli Mocelakolako relocated to the island of Batiki in the Lomaiviti group.

The Tora ni Bau is closely linked to the Vunivalu of Bau. This was strengthened by the marriage of Ratu Seru Cakobau's eldest daughter, Adi Viniana to the (known) tenth Tora ni Bau, Ratu Josaia Loloma.

== List ==
The following are known documented names of "installed" Tora ni Bau holders. (NOTE: Title holders who were not traditionally installed are not named on this list).

Ratu Virivirilau - installed in Delai Batiki Kubuna Bau,.
Ratu Sigaruarua - installed in Driti - Vugalei, Tailevu.
Ratu Vatucicila - installed in Nakorolevu - Namara, Tailevu.
Ratu Qiolele - installed in Nakorolevu - Nakoromakawa, Tailevu.
Ratu Sevanaia Vuinaruwai - installed in Nakorolevu - Nakoromakawa, Tailevu. (NOTE: Beginning of CHRISTIANITY, also note introduction of Christian names). Ratu Josaia Milamila - installed in Nakoromakawa, Tailevu.
Ratu Vuiwakaya - installed in Nakoromakawa, Tailevu.
Ratu Isireli Mocelakolako- installed in Nakoromakawa, Tailevu. (Relocated to the chiefly island of Batiki, Lomaivit).
Ratu Timoci Rakavali - installed in Mua, Batiki, Lomaiviti.
Ratu Josaia Loloma - installed in Mua, Batiki, Lomaiviti.
Ratu Emasi Caucau - installed in Mua, Batiki, Lomaiviti.
Ratu Jope Sigaruarua - installed in Mua, Batiki, Lomaiviti.
Ratu Isireli Mocelakolako Caucau - installed in Mua, Batiki, Lomaiviti. (Former president of the Methodist church in Fiji and Rotuma).

VKB, FIJIAN HERITAGE

== History ==
The title of the Tora ni Bau, which translates as Watchtower of Bau, was created by Gudrunavanua, a high chief and warlord from Sawaieke on the island of Gau for his nephew Savai in the 18th century. Gudrunavanua feared that Bau posed a threat to the neighboring islands. A similar title and responsibility was created on the delta village of Nabitu in Tokatoka by the Sawaieke Warlord. This had a strategic purpose as he was planning to launch an assault on the Rewan Roko Tui Dreketi, the King of the delta villages. Gudrunavanua, who was of Samoan ancestry, was famous for bestowing upon himself the title of Takala-i-Gau, or ruler of the island of Gau. His successor was named Toravi Nadawa or guardian of Nadawa. It was Toravi Nadawa who brought the Tui Dreketi to his knees begging for his life in Nabitu.
