= Naitaba =

Island in Fiji

Coordinates: 17°01′S 179°17′W

- Location within Fiji

Geography
- Location: Fiji
- Archipelago: Lau Islands
- Highest elevation: 186 m (610 ft)

Administration
- Fiji
- Division: Eastern Division
- Province: Lau Province
- District: Lau Other Islands

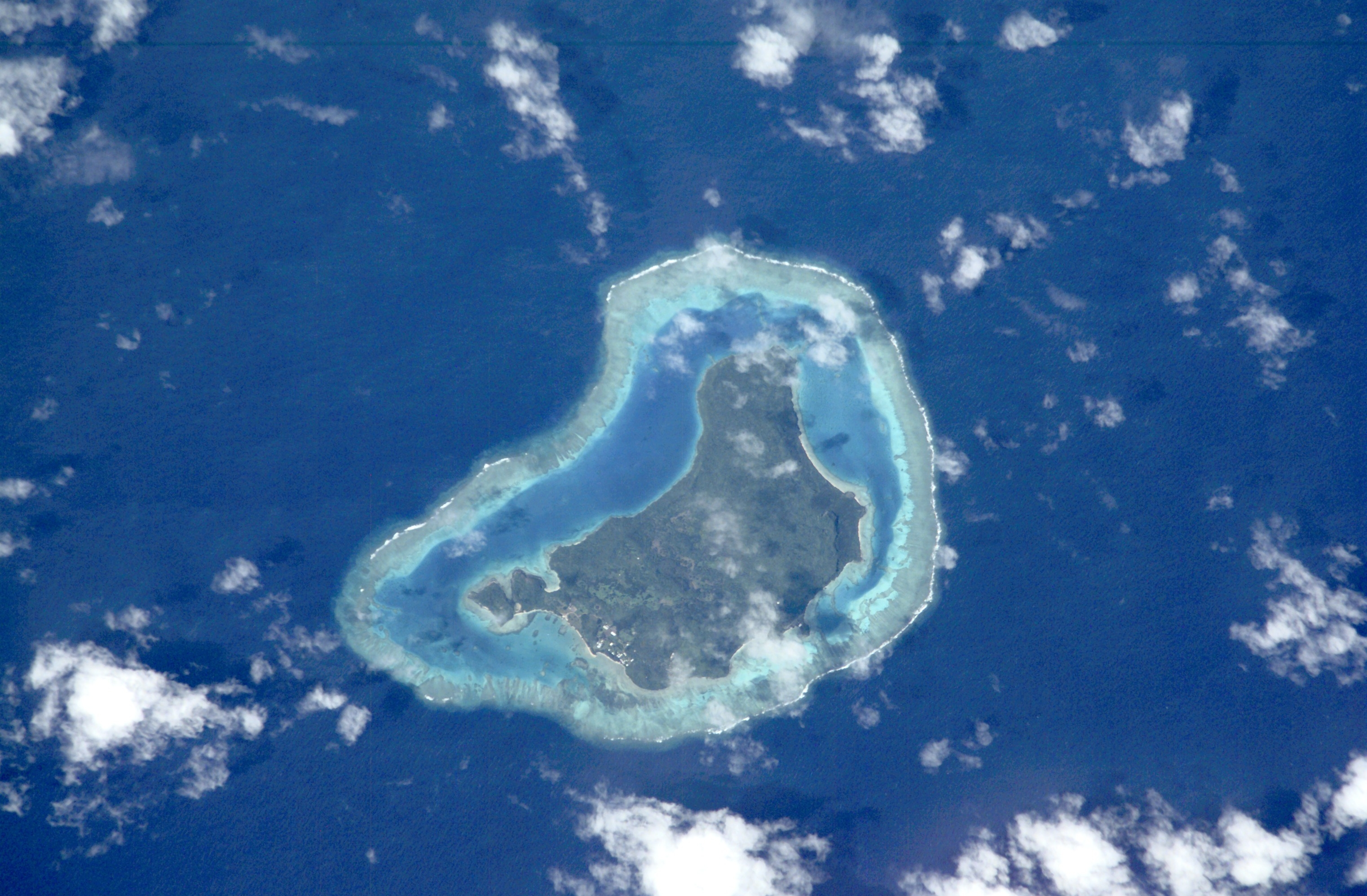

Naitaba Island (Naitauba, Naitaba) is an island of the northern Lau Islands of Fiji. It is a triangular shaped island approximately 2.4 km (1.5 mi) in diameter. The island is volcanic with coral and rises to 186 metres (610 ft) on a flat-topped hill toward the southern end of the island. The island is forested and coconuts were grown commercially for copra. There is a barrier reef completely surrounding the island.

== History ==
In early 1920 the coconut estates on Wakaya and Naitaba suffered a heavy loss due to a storm. In 1965 the actor Raymond Burr and his partner purchased 1,625 hectares (4,015 acres) on the island, where they raised copra and cattle. This land was sold in 1983 to Johannine Daist Communion for the use of Adi Da, with a purchase price of $2.1 million. It was reported that Adi Da died of cardiac arrest on November 27, 2008, at his home on the island, while working on his art.
