= Nairai =

Island in Fiji

Coordinates: 17°48′S 179°25′E

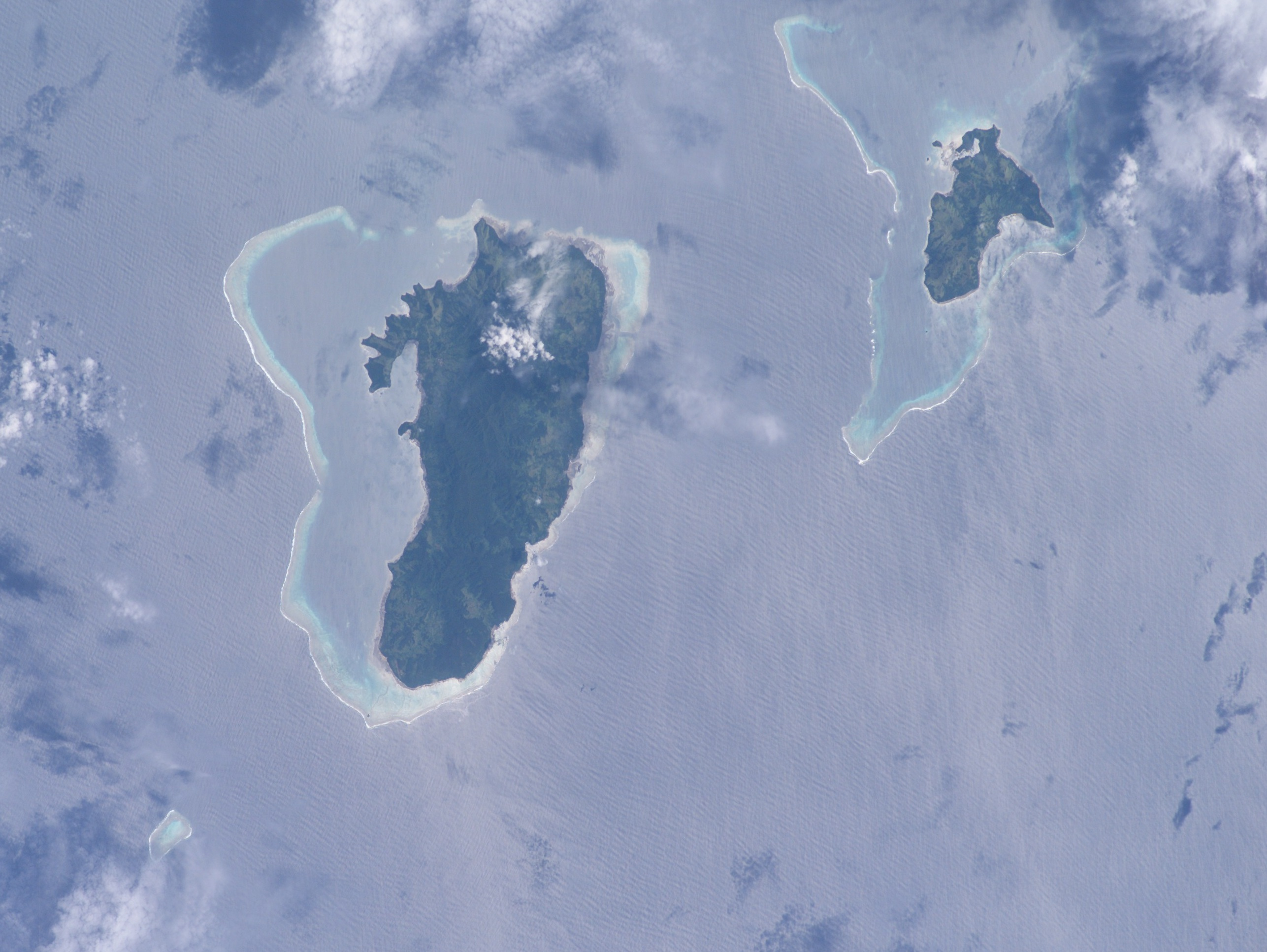
- A photo taken by NASA astronaut of Gau along with Nairai to the north-east

- Location within Fiji

Geography
- Location: Koro Sea; South Pacific
- Archipelago: Lomaiviti Islands
- Area: 30 km^{2} (12 sq mi)

Administration
- Fiji
- Division: Eastern Division
- Province: Lomaiviti
- Largest settlement: Natauloa

Demographics
- Population: 483 (2017)

Nairai is an island of Fiji and a tikina (district) belonging to the Lomaiviti Archipelago. The island is of volcanic origin and has a land area of about 30 square kilometers. To the west of the island is Batiki, and to the south-west is Gau.

Its population of almost 500 Fijians lives in coastal villages. Economic activity is subsistence farming and fishing, with copra farming being the main source of income. The island has no airport, although it has a jetty in Tovulailai. Transport is by local cargo vessels or small boats, since there are no roads for vehicles.

There are five villages on the island, consisting of Natauloa (the chiefly village and the seat of the Turaga na Tui Nairai and also the high chief of the island), Tovulailai (which has a jetty and a nursing station), Vutuna, Lawaki, and Waitoga. There are three primary schools, although there is no high school.
