= Lomaiviti Islands =

Island group of Fiji

Lomaiviti
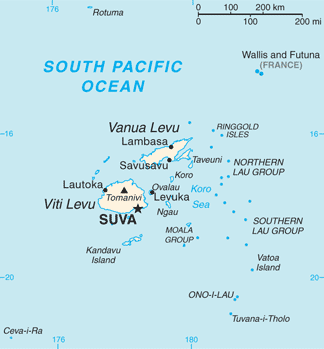
- Map of Fiji showing the islands of Lomaiviti and several other islands
- Interactive map of Lomaiviti

Geography
- Location: Southwest Pacific
- Coordinates: 17.709°S 179.091°E
- Major islands: 7: Gau; Ovalau; Koro; Nairai; Moturiki; Wakaya; Makogai
- Area: 411 km^{2} (159 sq mi)

Administration
- Fiji
- Province: Lomaiviti Province
- Capital city: Suva

Demographics
- Population: 15,657 (2017)

The Lomaiviti (pronounced [lomaiˈβitʃi]) archipelago of Fiji consists of seven main islands and a number of smaller ones. They cover a total area of 411 square kilometres (159 mi^{2}), and had a population of 15,657 at the most recent census in 2017. The largest town, with a population of 1,131 in 2007, is Levuka, which was Fiji's first modern town and served as the capital from 1871 to 1877.

== History ==
The first known European sighting of the Lomaiviti Group was recorded in May 1789 by Captain William Bligh, who was on his epic voyage in a lifeboat to Timor having been cast adrift by his crew in the Mutiny on the Bounty. He revisited the area in 1792 in HMS Providence to complete his survey of the area.

The islands of Koro, Batiki, and Gau were seized by the United States Navy in 1867 as security for a long-standing debt owed to the United States consul John Brown Williams by Seru Epenisa Cakobau, the Vunivalu (Paramount Chief) of Bau Island who claimed to be King of Fiji. This debt was one of the factors contributing to Cakobau's decision to cede Fiji to the United Kingdom in 1874, just three years after achieving his decades-long desire of uniting Fiji's myriad islands and tribes under his authority.

== Politics ==
Lomaiviti comprises one of the fourteen provinces of Fiji, called Lomaiviti Province.

== Notable Lomaivitians ==
Well-known natives of Lomaiviti include Mosese Qionibaravi CMG (10 September 1938 – 22 September 1987) was a civil servant and politician. He served as a member of the House of Representatives from 1973 until his death, also holding the offices of Speaker of the House, Minister of Foreign Affairs, Tourism and Finance, and Deputy Prime Minister. Simione Kaitani, a former Minister (2001–2006) in the government of Prime Minister Laisenia Qarase and, as of June 2006, the manager of government business in the House of Representatives as Leader of the House. Former Deputy Prime Minister Taufa Vakatale and the well-known Minister for Home Affairs, Josefa Vosanibola, is also from Lomaiviti.

== See also ==
- List of islands
