= Cyclone Winston =

Category 5 South Pacific cyclone in 2016

Severe Tropical Cyclone Winston
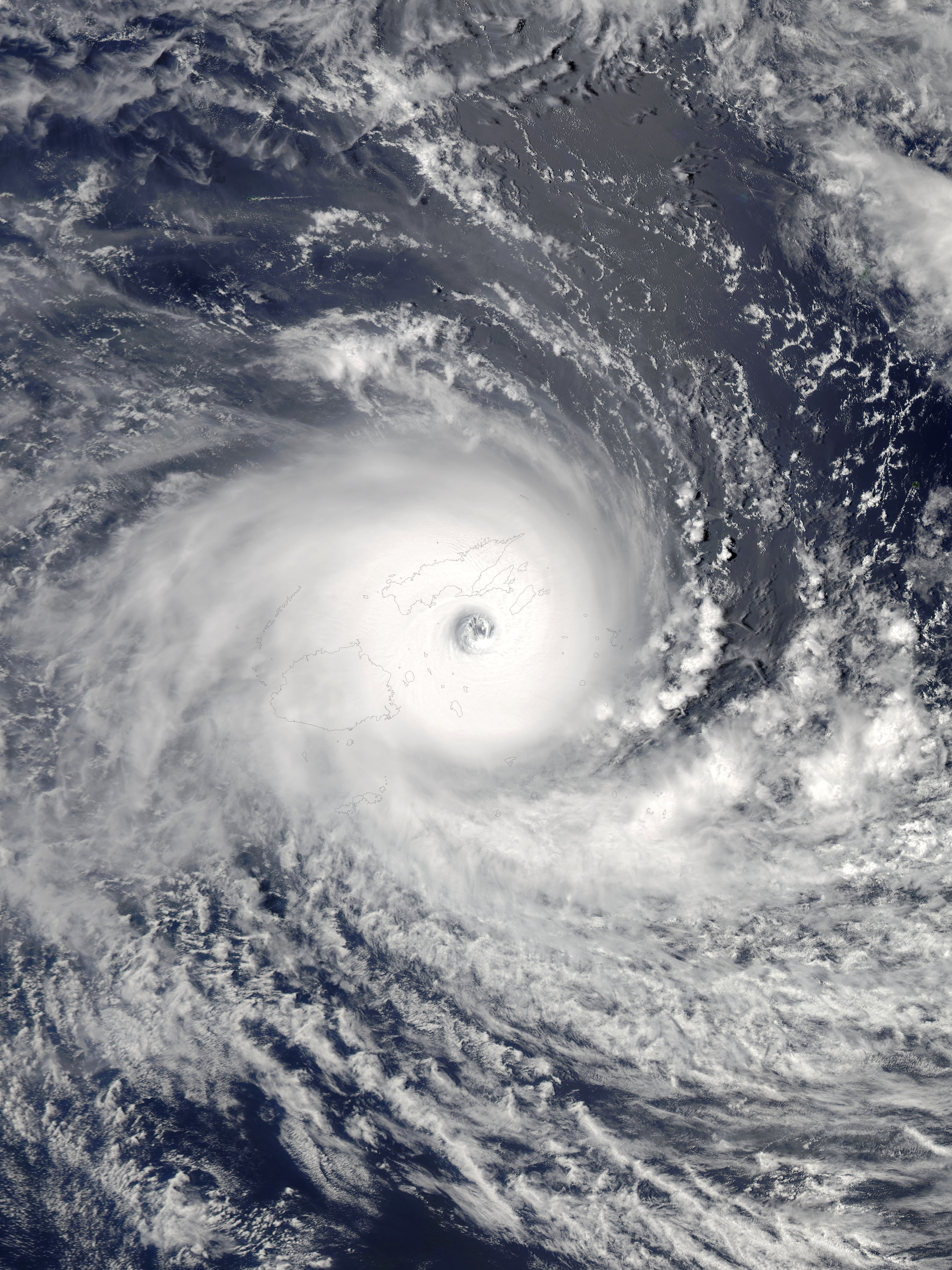
- Cyclone Winston at record peak intensity on 20 February, just before making landfall in Fiji

Meteorological history
- Formed: 7 February 2016
- Dissipated: 3 March 2016

Category 5 severe tropical cyclone
- 10-minute sustained (FMS)
- Highest winds: 280 km/h (175 mph) (Record highest worldwide, Record highest at landfall)
- Lowest pressure: 884 hPa (mbar); 26.10 inHg (Official record low in Southern Hemisphere; global record low at landfall)

Category 5-equivalent tropical cyclone
- 1-minute sustained (SSHWS/JTWC)
- Highest winds: 285 km/h (180 mph)
- Lowest pressure: 907 hPa (mbar); 26.78 inHg

Overall effects
- Fatalities: 44 total
- Damage: $1.4 billion (2016 USD) (Third-costliest cyclone in the South Pacific basin)
- Areas affected: Vanuatu, Fiji, Tonga, Niue, Queensland
- IBTrACS
- Part of the 2015–16 South Pacific and Australian region cyclone seasons

Severe Tropical Cyclone Winston was an extremely powerful, long-lived, erratic, and destructive tropical cyclone that made a catastrophic landfall in Fiji in late February 2016. Winston became the most intense tropical cyclone in the Southern Hemisphere on record, with a central pressure of 884 mbar (26.10 inHg). It is also the strongest to make landfall on record worldwide in terms of ten-minute maximum sustained winds and central pressure. At the time, Winston was the costliest tropical cyclone on record in the South Pacific basin, until it was surpassed by Cyclone Gabrielle in 2023. The fourth named storm and third severe tropical cyclone of the 2015–16 South Pacific cyclone season, Winston was the most intense and longest lasting tropical cyclone worldwide in 2016.

The system was first noted as a tropical disturbance on 7 February 2016, when it was located to the northwest of Port Vila, Vanuatu. Over the next few days, the system gradually developed as it moved southeast, acquiring gale-force winds by 11 February. The following day, it underwent rapid intensification and attained ten-minute maximum sustained winds of 175 km/h (109 mph). Less favourable environmental conditions prompted weakening thereafter. After turning northeast on 14 February, Winston stalled to the north of Tonga on 17 February. Due to a change in higher level steering, the storm drifted back to the west. In the process, Winston again rapidly intensified, reaching Category 5 intensity on both the Australian tropical cyclone scale and the Saffir–Simpson hurricane wind scale on 19 February. The storm passed directly over Vanua Balavu, where a national record wind gust of 306 km/h (190 mph) was observed.

The cyclone reached its peak intensity on 20 February, with ten-minute sustained winds of 280 km/h (170 mph) and a pressure of 884 hPa (mbar; 26.10 inHg), shortly before making landfall on Viti Levu, Fiji. Thereafter, the storm slowly weakened within a less favourable environment; the system turned southeast during this time, though remained well away from Fiji. It later degenerated into a remnant low, with some subtropical characteristics, on 24 February as it turned to the west and later northwest. The system persisted for more than a week over the Coral Sea before ultimately moving over Queensland, Australia and dissipating on 3 March, 26 days after being classified a tropical disturbance.

In advance of the storm's arrival in Fiji, numerous shelters were opened, and a nationwide curfew was instituted during the evening of 20 February. Striking Fiji at Category 5 intensity on 20 February, Winston inflicted extensive damage on many islands and killed 44 people. Communications were temporarily lost with at least six islands, with some remaining isolated more than two days after the storm's passage. A total of 40,000 homes were damaged or destroyed and approximately 350,000 people—roughly 40 percent of Fiji's population—were significantly impacted by the storm. Total damage from Winston amounted to FJ$2.98 billion (US$1.4 billion). The nation's government declared a state of emergency on 20 February, which remained in place for 60 days. Immediately following the cyclone, the governments of Australia and New Zealand provided logistical support and relief packages. In the following weeks, a coalition of international support, including intergovernmental agencies, brought tens of millions of dollars in aid and hundreds of tons of supplies to residents in Fiji.

== Background ==
Though frequented by tropical cyclones in general, the main islands of Fiji—Viti Levu and Vanua Levu—are seldom impacted by intense storms like Winston. Before Winston, the strongest storm to affect the main islands since records began in 1941 was Evan in December 2012, which skirted the western coast of Viti Levu as a Category 4 system on both the Australian scale and the Saffir–Simpson hurricane wind scale. Also before Winston, the strongest storm to make landfall on either Viti Levu or Vanua Levu was Nigel in 1985, with ten-minute sustained winds of 150 km/h (95 mph) and one-minute sustained winds of 195 km/h (120 mph), Category 3 on both scales. Winston is the deadliest storm to affect the nation of Fiji since Cyclone Meli in 1979, which claimed 53 lives.

The relative lack of strong tropical cyclones affecting the capital city of Suva, located along the southeastern coast of Viti Levu, led to complacency among residents. Many assume that strong storms are confined to northern and western areas. With Winston approaching Fiji from the east and directly threatening Suva as a Category 5 severe tropical cyclone, Angela Fritz of The Washington Post called the storm a worst-case scenario.

== Meteorological history ==
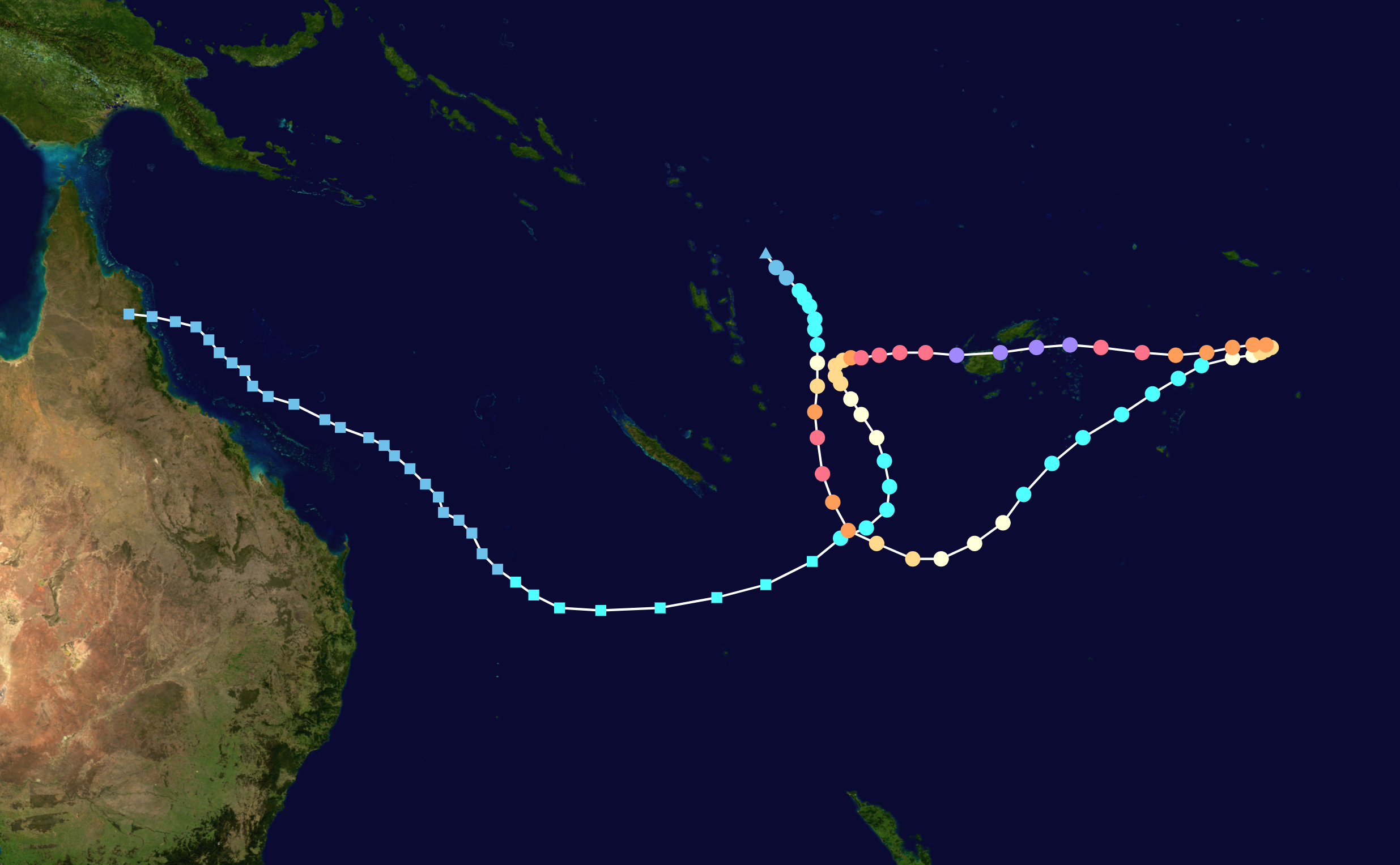
Map plotting the storm's track and intensity, according to the Saffir–Simpson scale Map key Saffir–Simpson scale Tropical depression (≤38 mph, ≤62 km/h) Tropical storm (39–73 mph, 63–118 km/h) Category 1 (74–95 mph, 119–153 km/h) Category 2 (96–110 mph, 154–177 km/h) Category 3 (111–129 mph, 178–208 km/h) Category 4 (130–156 mph, 209–251 km/h) Category 5 (≥157 mph, ≥252 km/h) Unknown Storm type Tropical cyclone Subtropical cyclone Extratropical cyclone, remnant low, tropical disturbance, or monsoon depression

On 7 February 2016, the Fiji Meteorological Service (FMS) started to monitor Tropical Disturbance 09F, which had developed about 1,000 km (620 mi) northwest of Port Vila, Vanuatu. Over the next few days the system moved southeast and gradually developed further within a favourable environment. On 10 February, the United States-based Joint Typhoon Warning Center (JTWC) initiated advisories on the system and classified it as Tropical Cyclone 11P, while it was located about 860 km (535 mi) to the west-northwest of Suva, Fiji. The FMS upgraded it to Category 1 status on the Australian tropical cyclone scale and assigned it the name Winston early on 11 February; at this time the storm was situated roughly 820 km (510 mi) west-northwest of Suva, Fiji. Embedded within a northwesterly deep layer mean flow, the system tracked southeast. Around 12:00 UTC on the same day, Winston intensified into a Category 2 tropical cyclone, as a small, well-defined eye developed within deepening convection.

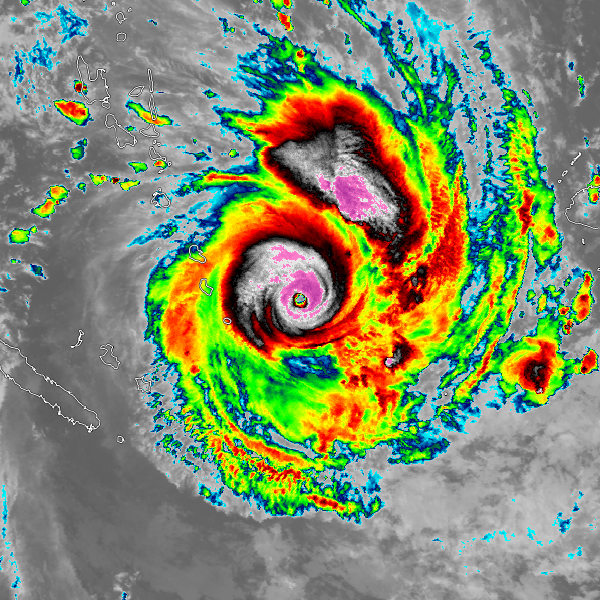
Winston reaching its initial peak intensity, southeast of Vanuatu on 12 February

Situated within a favorable environment for development—featuring sea surface temperatures of 30 to 31 °C (86 to 88 °F), robust upper-level outflow, and light to moderate wind shear—Winston rapidly intensified on 12 February, becoming a Category 3 severe tropical cyclone by 06:00 UTC, and then a Category 4 cyclone only six hours later. The system presented a well-defined eye enveloped by deep convection, and it reached its initial peak intensity at 18:00 UTC, with ten-minute maximum sustained winds of 175 km/h (109 mph) and the JTWC estimated one-minute maximum sustained winds at 215 km/h (134 mph), classifying it as a Category 4-equivalent cyclone on the Saffir–Simpson hurricane wind scale. Soon thereafter, increasing wind shear prompted weakening; convection waned and became increasingly ragged in appearance. On 14 February, Winston turned to the northeast as a subtropical ridge positioned itself to the north.

Persistent wind shear displaced convection from the center of Winston, leaving its circulation partially exposed. As a result, the system degraded below severe tropical cyclone status by 00:00 UTC on 15 February. Conditions became more favourable for development on 16 February when shear relaxed over the cyclone. A prominent banding feature wrapped into the circulation that day, marking the start of reintensification. An eye reformed later that day within increasing convection, and Winston regained severe tropical cyclone intensity by 18:00 UTC. The storm's core became increasingly compact and defined as it strengthened, and a central dense overcast became established on 17 February. Later that day, Winston entered a region of weak steering currents and the storm became nearly stationary. The storm's eye became more readily apparent late on 17 February, as it doubled back to the west.

Joe Munchak describes the features of Tropical Cyclone Winston.

A strengthening ridge to the south propelled Winston west by 18 February, directing the intensifying cyclone at Fiji. The storm's eye grew in size that day, and upper-level outflow became more defined. Winston's overall structure became increasingly symmetric, and the system acquired traits of an annular tropical cyclone. Another period of rapid intensification took place on 19 February as the storm's 27 km (17 mi) wide eye became surrounded by intense convection. Winston acquired Category 5 status—the highest level on the Australian intensity scale—by 06:00 UTC, with ten-minute sustained winds reaching 205 km/h (127 mph). Fueled by nearly perfect conditions for intensification, Winston deepened further and the JTWC estimated it to have acquired one-minute sustained winds of 270 km/h (170 mph) by 18:00 UTC, classifying it as a Category 5-equivalent cyclone on the Saffir–Simpson hurricane wind scale. Around this time, the cyclone passed directly over the small island of Vanua Balavu. There, a weather station recorded sustained winds of 233 km/h (145 mph) and a gust of 306 km/h (190 mph) before being destroyed; both values constitute a national record for Fiji.

Passing just south of Vanua Levu, Winston achieved its record intensity early on 20 February with ten-minute sustained winds of 280 km/h (170 mph) and a pressure of 884 hPa (mbar; 26.10 inHg). It was operationally estimated with ten-minute sustained winds of 230 km/h (140 mph) and a pressure of 915 hPa (mbar; 27.02 inHg). The JTWC estimated Winston with one-minute sustained winds of 285 km/h (177 mph). At peak intensity, it revealed a fairly symmetric convective structure with a 25 km (16 mi) round eye, under low vertical wind shear easily offset by strong divergence aloft; moreover, sea surface temperatures remained warm, near 28 °C (82 °F). Winston soon made landfall in the Rakiraki District on Viti Levu at peak intensity, making it the only known Category 5 storm, on both the Australian tropical cyclone scale and the Saffir-Simpson scale, to directly impact Fiji, and therefore the most intense storm on record to strike the nation. It also marked the strongest landfall by any cyclone in the South Pacific basin, and one of the strongest landfalls worldwide. Despite deteriorating slightly while crossing the northern portion of Viti Levu, Winston remained well-organised, reforming a ragged and cloud-filled eye after re-emerging into open waters.

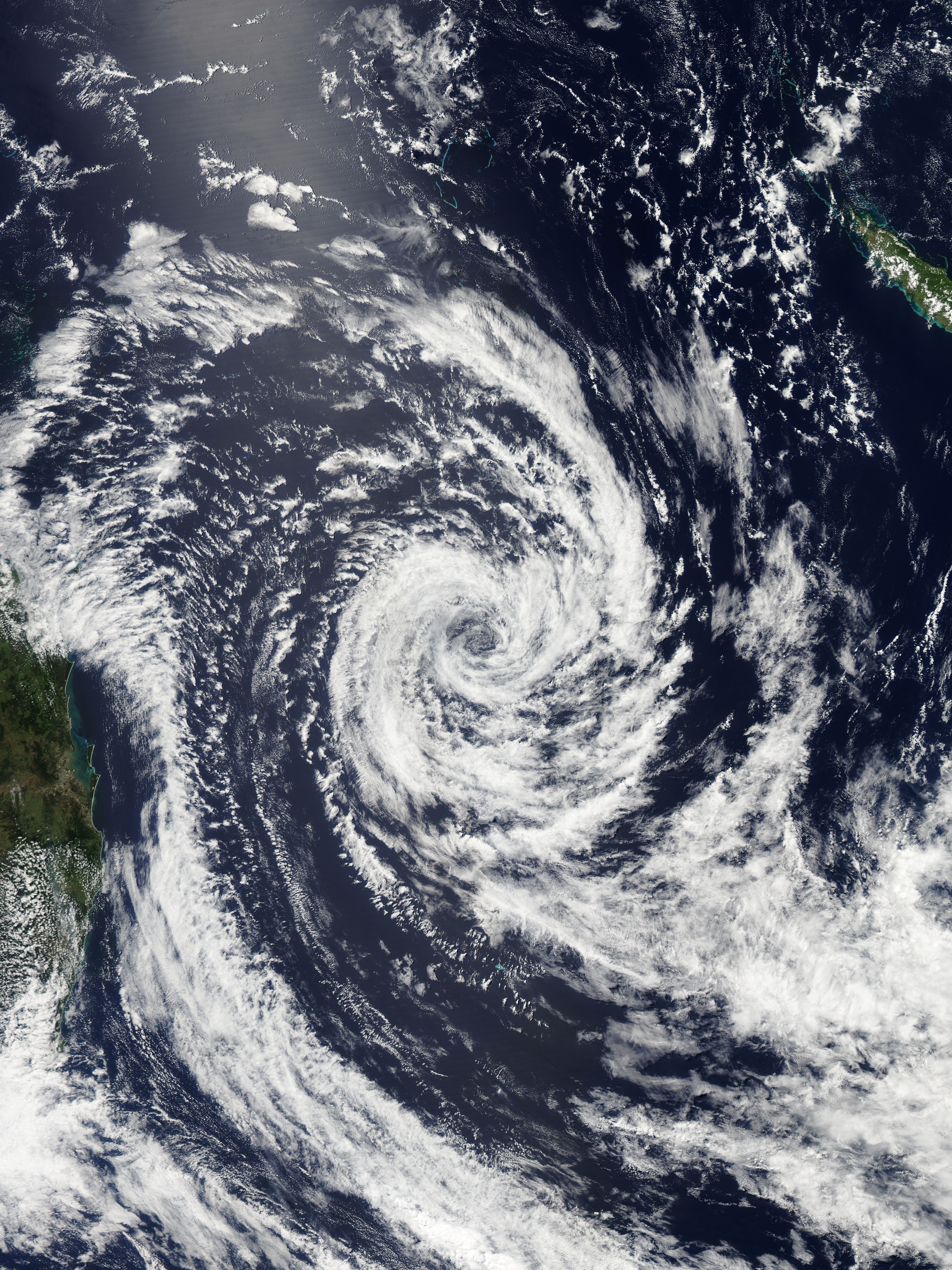
Winston east of Queensland, with subtropical characteristics on 27 February

Still under favorable conditions, Winston maintained intensity until early on 21 February, when upwelling of cooler waters beneath the decelerating cyclone caused it to weaken into a Category 4 cyclone. On 22 February, Winston sharply recurved south-southeastwards as the primary steering mechanism shifted from a ridge retrograding westwards to a ridge building to the east; moreover, dry air hindered reintensification. Very strong vertical wind shear and cooling sea surface temperatures resulted in steady weakening, and Winston dropped below severe tropical cyclone intensity on 23 February. Later, the low-level circulation center became fully exposed with shallow convection sheared to the south. As the system weakened, the relatively shallow subtropical ridge began to steer it southwestwards. Late on 24 February, when Winston entered TCWC Wellington's area of responsibility, the JTWC issued the final warning and indicated subtropical characteristics, citing the weakening mid-level warm core and the expanding wind field.

MetService claimed that Winston transitioned into an extratropical cyclone southeast of New Caledonia with gale-force winds at 00:00 UTC on 25 February, yet the JTWC continued to classify Winston as a subtropical system. On 26 February, beneath an upper-level low which produced subsidence aloft and high vertical wind shear, Winston revealed a strong low-level warm core and a weak upper-level cold core. The post-tropical cyclone moved into the Australian region basin in the afternoon, where it began to weaken once again. Although Winston began to move northwestwards and track over warmer sea surface temperature since 27 February, unfavourable upper-level conditions as well as dry air prevented reintensification. The system continued to track off the coast of Queensland, Australia as a weak and shallow system. The Australian Bureau of Meteorology reported that Winston had eventually transitioned into a tropical low and made landfall over the coast north of Cairns, at 1200 UTC on 3 March, locally at night. Winston soon degenerated into a trough over land.

== Impact ==
=== Effects in Fiji ===
Winston making landfall in Viti Levu on 20 February

On 14 February, the FMS began issuing tropical cyclone warnings for the southern Lau Islands of Fiji. These gradually expanded in coverage through 15 February, but were discontinued on 16 February, as Winston moved away from the nation. Warnings were resumed on 18 February, after Winston doubled back toward Fiji, and were issued for the northern and eastern islands. Most of the northern islands in the storm's immediate path were placed under hurricane warnings on 19 February. All shelters across the Southern Lau Islands, Koro Island, and Taveuni were opened on 19 February; more than 700 shelters opened across the entirety of Fiji. The Republic of Fiji Military Forces were placed on standby for relief efforts. A state of emergency was declared during the afternoon of 20 February, and remained in place until 20 April. A nationwide curfew was enacted starting at 6:00 p.m. local time. Public transportation was suspended across Viti Levu, and the Fiji Roads Authority strongly advised residents to avoid travel unless necessary. Prime Minister Frank Bainimarama called the storm "an ordeal of the most grievous kind".

Striking the nation on 20 February, Winston brought widespread damage to numerous islands. Approximately 80 percent of the nation's 900,000 people lost power, including the entirety of Vanua Levu, as hurricane-force winds downed trees and power lines. Communications with Vanua Balavu, Lakeba, Cicia, Nayau, Taveuni, and Qamea were lost on 20 February. Contact with Vanua Balavu had yet to be established as of the evening of 22 February. Landline telephone service was lost on Matuku Island. A total of 44 people were killed across the nation: 21 in the Western Division, 15 in the Eastern Division, 6 in the Central Division, and 2 in the Northern Division. An additional 126 were injured. An estimated 350,000 people—the nation's total population was 837,721 as of the 2007 census—were affected by the storm.

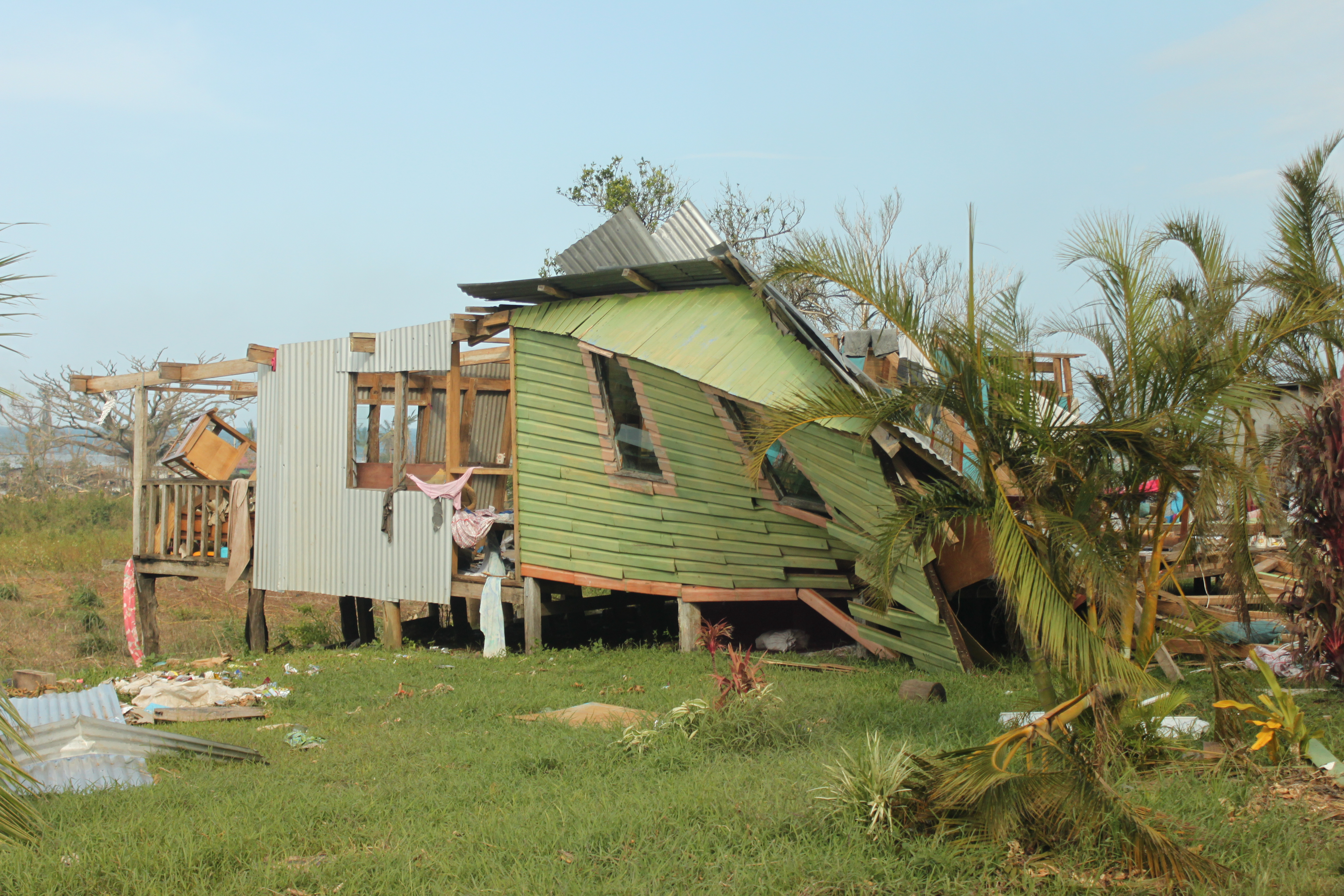
A home largely destroyed by the storm in Tailevu Province

Fiji's Eastern Division was the first to be struck by Winston, with many islands sustaining catastrophic damage. Entire communities were destroyed and approximately 40,000 people required immediate assistance. Koro Island sustained severe damage, with schools destroyed and many structures losing their roofs. Kade Village was leveled, with nearly all structures destroyed. One individual died in Nabasovi when his home collapsed, and twelve people were injured in Nabuna. Another woman on the island later died in the hospital from injuries she sustained. A total of 788 homes were destroyed and 234 were damaged across Koro Island, rendering more than 3,000 people homeless. Significant damage was reported across Ovalau, where maximum water run-up reached 7 m (23 ft). Across Taveuni Island, 722 homes were destroyed and 837 were damaged at an estimated cost of FJ$11.2 million (US$5.29 million). The two main ports on Taveuni were severely damaged and largely rendered unusable. Southern areas of the island became isolated when a bridge was destroyed. A communication tower on Mago Island, owned by Mel Gibson, collapsed. In Lomaiviti Province alone, the storm created 42,000 tons of debris.

On Viti Levu, strong winds destroyed at least two homes in Waidamu; the Waidamu River also topped its banks and flooded nearby communities. In Drauniivi village, 64 homes were completely destroyed and 70 more sustained damage. Hundreds of homes were destroyed in and around Rakiraki Town, with the area described as a scene of devastation and despair by the Fiji Times. The southern coast of Vanua Levu was battered by a significant storm surge which inundated areas up to 183 m (600 ft) inland near Tacilevu Village. Maximum wave run-up reached 5 m (16 ft) in Nukubalavu.

Throughout Fiji, a total of 40,000 homes were damaged or destroyed. The Western Division accounted for the majority of damage, with 6,954 homes destroyed and 11,234 damaged. This left approximately 131,000 people in need of immediate shelter assistance. In addition, 229 schools were severely damaged or destroyed. Total damage from the storm amounted to FJ$2.98 billion (US$1.4 billion). However, despite the massive damage caused by Winston, the main tourism sector was largely spared.

=== Other South Pacific nations ===
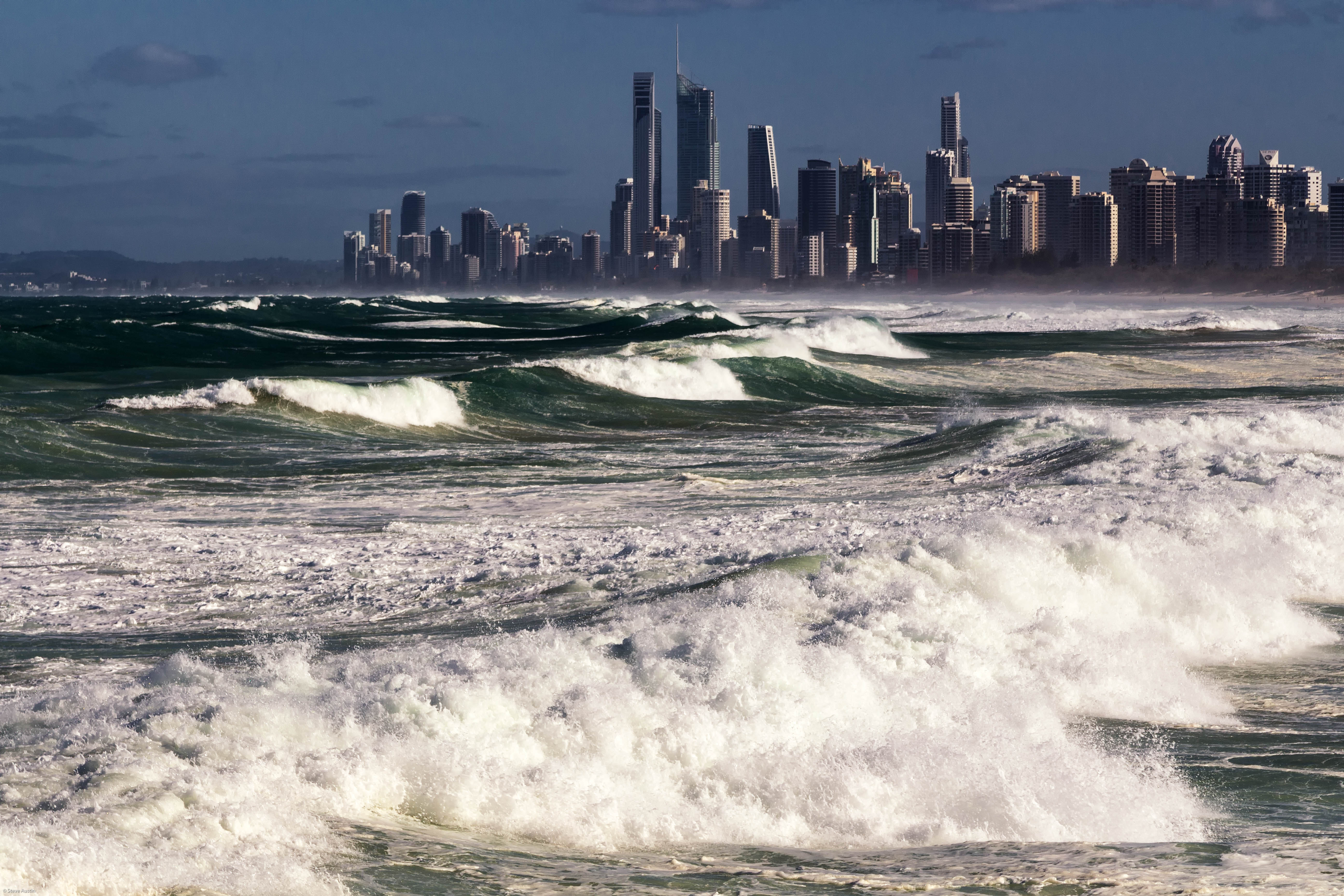
Large swells in Gold Coast, Queensland injured multiple people and prompted the closure of beaches

Impacting Tonga twice within the span of a few days, Winston caused significant damage across northern Tonga. Approximately 2,500 people sought refuge in shelters. The first passage of the storm resulted in mostly crop damage while the second brought greater structural damage. At least 10 homes were destroyed and 200 more were damaged. Agriculture sustained significant damage, with 85–95 percent of the banana crop and most of the vanilla crop on Vava'u lost. Winston also affected Niue on 16 February; the FMS also issued tropical cyclone and damaging heavy swell warnings for the island nation.

The nation of Tonga also received money and aid as well as medical supplies from New Zealand, which also provided 8,000 people with clean water. Australia also provided assistance to Tonga, including the distribution of A$300,000 worth of humanitarian supplies through the Tonga Red Cross Society, two surveillance and assessment aircraft, and two disaster management experts from the Australian Civilian Corps to aid in relief efforts.

Large swells—up to 4 to 6 m (13 to 20 ft) in height—from the remnants of Winston affected southern Queensland, Australia. Beaches at Gold Coast and Sunshine Coast were closed on 26 and 27 February due to dangerous conditions. At least 15 people sustained injuries, ranging from dislocated shoulders to broken legs, due to rough conditions. A bodyboarder was reported missing near Tallebudgera; a helicopter search failed to locate anyone and the search was called off until a missing person report was filed. Severe storms on 29 February associated with the outer bands of Winston's remnants brought locally heavy rains to parts of Queensland. 106 mm (4.2 in) of rain fell in Garbutt, while 80 mm (3.1 in) of rain was observed in Townsville in the space of 1 hour. On 3 March heavy rain began to fall in north Queensland as Winston's remnants moved ashore near Cairns. Accumulations reached 215 mm (8.5 in) in the small town of Feluga.

== Aftermath ==
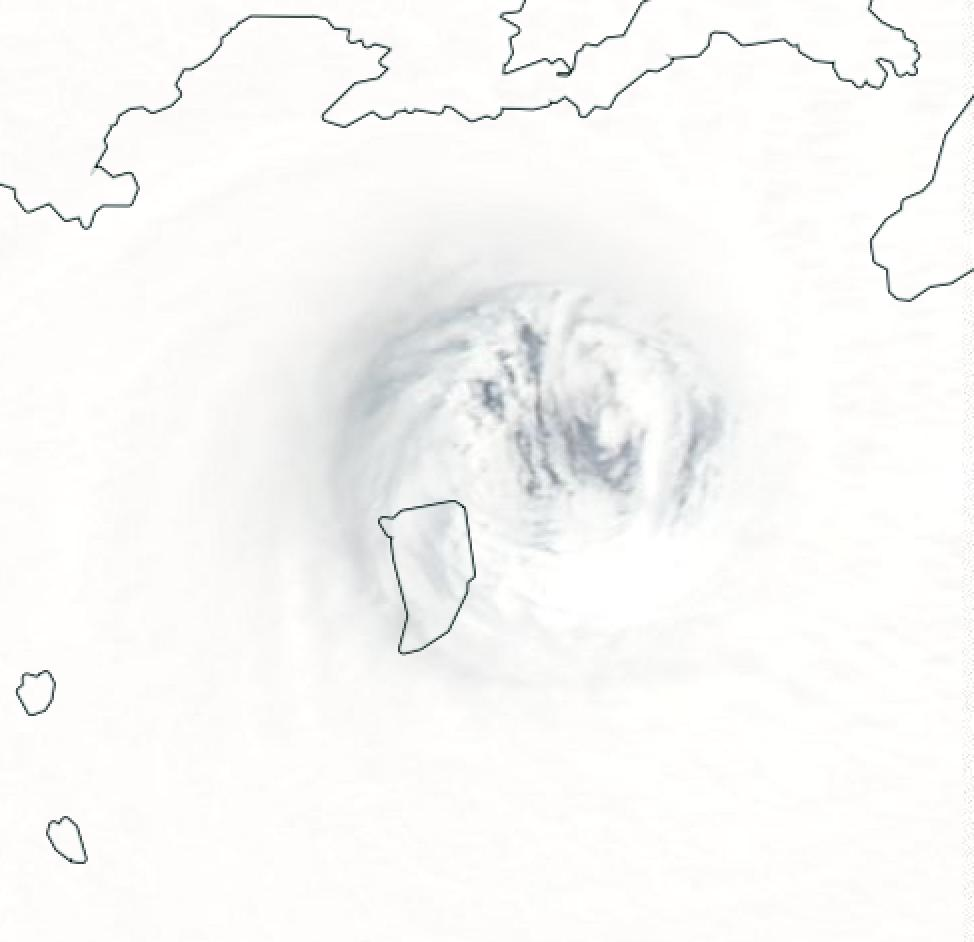
The eye of Winston over Koro Island on 20 February

Cyclone Winston's devastating impact across Fiji rendered tens of thousands homeless, and prompted a major international humanitarian response. An estimated 350,000 people (40 percent of the nation's population) were moderately or severely affected by the storm, including 120,000 children. Approximately 250,000 people required water, sanitation, and hygiene (WASH) assistance due to power outages and damaged infrastructure. Through the evening of 26 February, approximately 62,000 people were housed evacuation centres across the country, primarily in the Western Division. This number steadily fell to 29,237 by 4 March, though thousands more stayed with relatives. The Governments of Australia, France, and New Zealand quickly responded with a large-scale relief effort within days of the storm's passage. Several other nations provided donations, supplies and funds, as did various international organizations.

=== Local ===
All schools across Fiji suspended classes for at least a week, two weeks for those in the hardest-hit areas because of severe damage to the educational infrastructure. Hundreds of schools resumed activities on 29 February. All but 23 schools resumed classes by 8 March across the nation. In Labasa, two people were arrested for breaking curfew and others were reprimanded. The main airport serving the country, Nadi International Airport, was closed as a result of the cyclone. It was re-opened two days after the storm to allow the humanitarian supplies to be received and tourists to leave. The nation's government deployed two ships to Koro Island carrying assessment teams and emergency supplies. Rakiraki Town was shut down to travel at 7:30 a.m. local time on 23 February to allow crews to clear debris from roads.

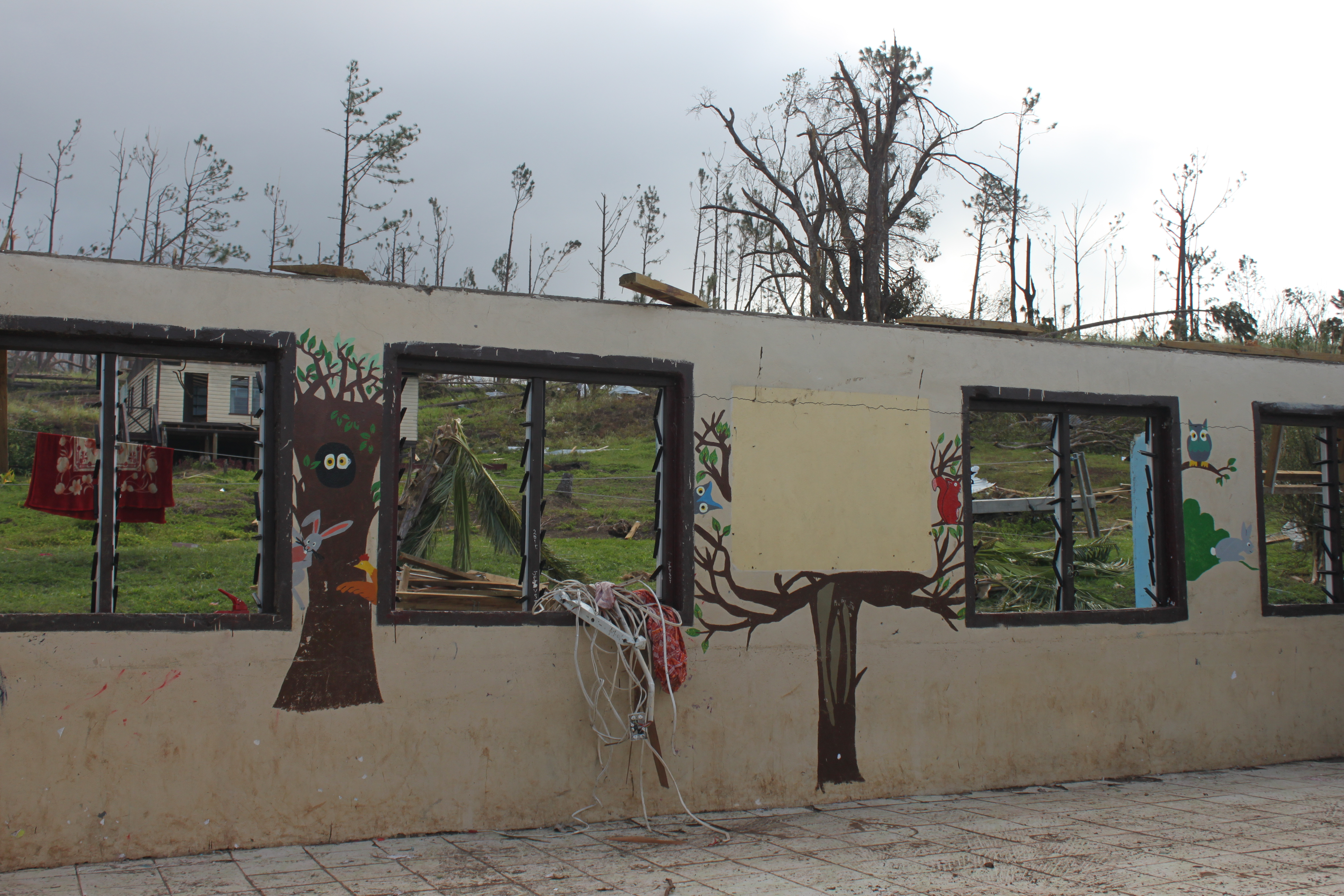
A school destroyed by the storm in Tailevu Province

The Fiji Electricity Authority estimated that it would take three weeks to restore service to most of the Western Division. Digicel set up battery charging stations in Suva on 22 February. The company quickly restored telephone service to the main islands within two days of the storm. The spread of breeding grounds for mosquitos brought on by the storm led to an increase in dengue fever cases, with 131 incidents reported after Winston's passage. Ultimately, no large-scale outbreak resulted from the storm. Vegetable prices saw marked increases in price, in some cases by 500 percent, following Winston.

Costliest South Pacific Ocean tropical cyclones
Rank	Tropical cyclones	Season	Damage USD	Refs
1	3 Gabrielle	2022–23	$9.2 billion	
2	TD 06F	2022–23	$1.43 billion	
3	5 Winston	2015–16	$1.4 billion	
4	5 Harold	2019–20	$768 million	
5	5 Pam	2014–15	$543 million	
6	5 Judy and Kevin	2022–23	$433 million	
7	4 Val	1991–92	$381 million	
8	5 Lola	2023–24	$352 million	
9	4 Evan	2012–13	$313 million	
10	4 Gita	2017–18	$253 million	

On 22 February, Prime Minister Frank Bainimarama established a disaster relief fund and requested donations. Fiji Airways provided FJ$1 million (US$465,000), MWH Global donated FJ$100,000, retailer Jack's of Fiji donated FJ$100,000 (US$50,000) and an equal amount worth of clothing. Digicel pledged FJ$150,000 (US$70,000) on 27 February and provided another FJ$50,000 (US$23,000) to the National Disaster Management Office. Three music bands from Koro Island–Voqa Ni Delai Dokidoki, Malumu Ni Tobu, and Savu Ni Delai Lomai–held a benefit concert in Suva on 29 February, with all donations to be donated to the Fijian Prime Minister's Relief and Rehabilitation Fund. Under the Social Welfare's Poverty Benefit Scheme and Care and Protection Allowance, the Government of Fiji allocated FJ$19.9 million (US$9.42 million) to 43,624 families.

In the three weeks following Winston, Empower Pacific provided approximately 7,000 people with psychological support and counseling.

On 9 April, Prime Minister Bainimarama unveiled a FJ$70 million (US$34 million) housing reconstruction initiative called "Help for Homes" targeted at lower income families—with an annual household income less than FJ$50,000 (US$24,000)—that could not afford repair costs.

=== International ===
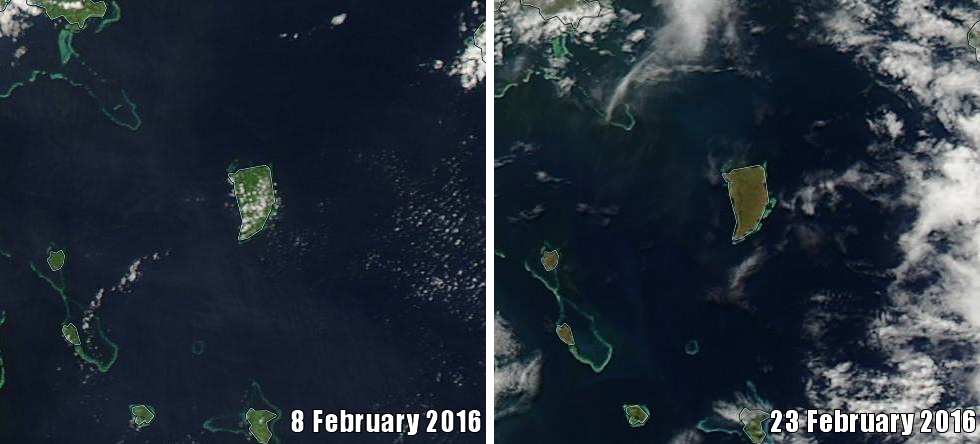
Koro Island before (left) and after (right) Winston. Severe defoliation is readily seen with the island's green landscape turned brown.

The Government of China provided US$100,000 on 23 February, and a further US$1 million on 4 March. India supplied US$1 million as immediate assistance, and also deployed a C-17 Globemaster III carrying 40 tons of aid. A further US$300,000 was provided by the Then India Sanmarga Ikya Sangam, of which US$25,000 was given to the Fijian Prime Minister's Disaster Relief Fund. The Government of South Korea provided FJ$107,000 (US$50,000) and GIMCO Korea Ltd. donated FJ$50,000 (US$23,000). The Asian Development Bank provided US$2 million in assistance. The European Union provided FJ$10 million (US$4.6 million) through the Pacific Community for a short-term response. Vanuatu donated 10 million vatu (US$90,000). Indonesia pledged FJ$10.38 million (US$5 million) and would fund the reconstruction of Queen Victoria School, one of many schools destroyed by the storm. Others involved in humanitarian assistance in one way or another include Singapore, the United States, Japan, and Nauru.

On 21 February, members of International Red Cross and Red Crescent Societies (IFRC) began ground surveys to determine emergency needs. They also provided residents in poor communities and shelters with supplies. The Fiji chapter of the Red Cross launched a country-wide appeal for donations and supplies on 22 February. The IFRC released CHF 317,469 from their Disaster Relief Emergency Fund to support the Fijian Red Cross and 5,000 people in need of immediate aid. Relief teams from charities and non-governmental organizations including AmeriCares, Caritas Internationalis, MapAction, and ShelterBox were deployed to Fiji to assist with recovery efforts within a day of the storm. ShelterBox committed more than £1 million (US$1.4 million) to relief efforts. The International Organization for Migration allocated US$200,000 in immediate funds on 22 February. Oxfam placed members across the Southwestern Pacific on standby for deployment. Direct Relief provided 6,800 kg (15,000 lb) of medical supplies to hospitals across Fiji.

The IFRC launched an emergency appeal for the nation on 29 February seeking CHF 7 million to benefit 38,500 people over a period of 12 months. The United Nations Office for the Coordination of Humanitarian Affairs (UNOCHA) launched an appeal for US$38.6 million—including US$7.1 million for UNICEF projects—on 4 March. International donations of items and technical assistance reached US$22 million and cash donations amounted to US$9 million by this date. Stephen O'Brien, head of UNOCHA, released US$8 million from the UN's Central Emergency Response Fund. WASH supplies were distributed to 26,125 people by this date.

==== FRANZ agreement ====
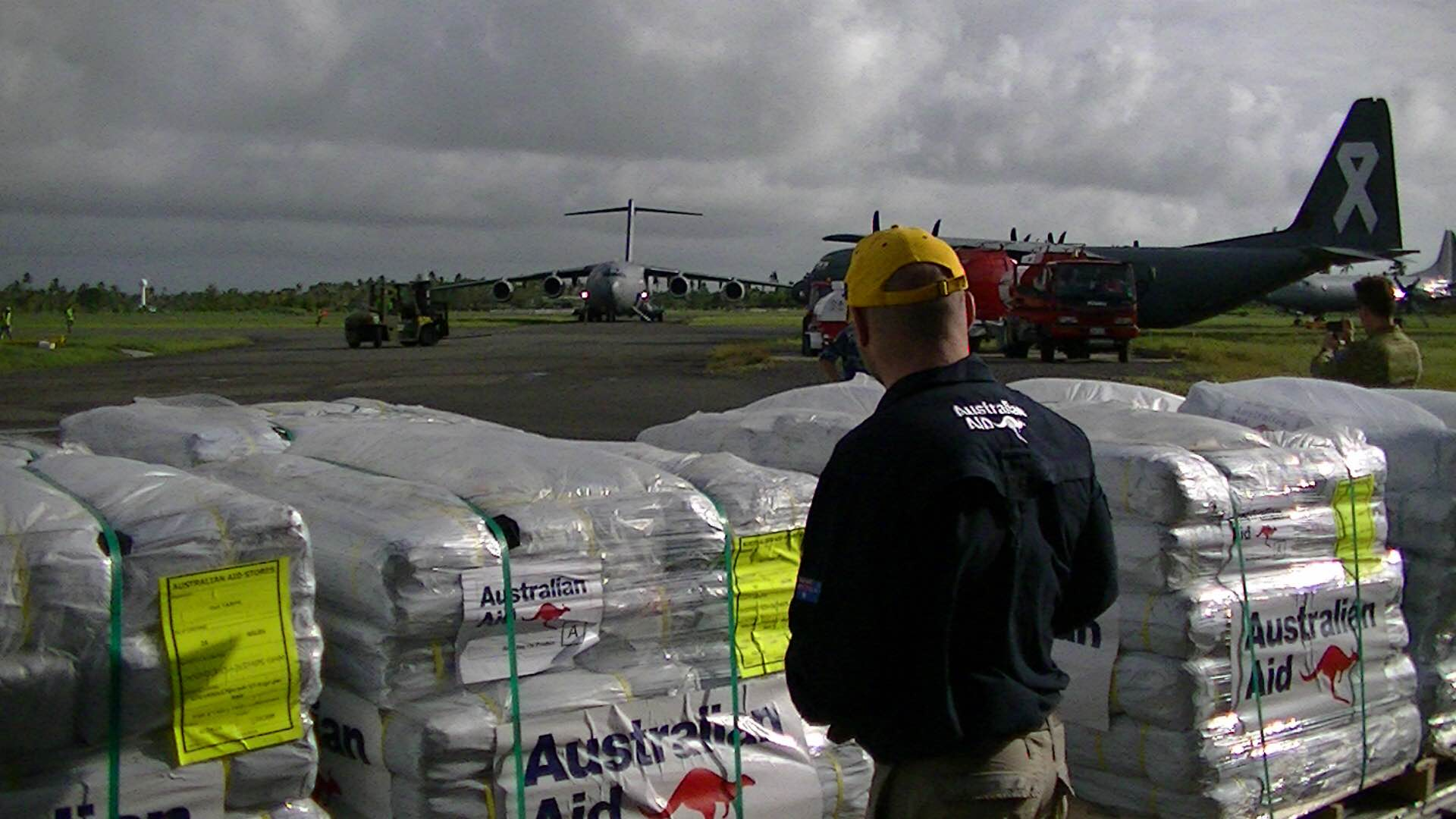
Relief supplies from Australian AID being loaded into aircraft for delivery to Koro Island.

In accordance with the FRANZ agreement, Australia, France, and New Zealand coordinated relief efforts to help Fiji. On 21 February, the government of New Zealand set aside an initial NZ$50,000 (US$34,000) to the High Commission of the Republic of the Fiji Islands to New Zealand in preparation for relief efforts, alongside NZ$170,000 (US$114,000) worth of relief supplies. The RNZAF deployed a Lockheed P-3 Orion, C-130 Hercules and a Boeing 757 with a team of New Zealand Army engineers and firefighters with a specialist SAR tea RNZN ships carrying two air force NH-90 helicopters deployed to Fiji to assist in relief efforts. RNZAF P-3 Orion was sent immediately to the area to aid in aerial surveillance and assessments of the damage situation in Fiji. New Zealand Minister of Foreign Affairs Murray McCully toured Fiji on 29 February and described the damage as "an endless sea of [airplane] crashes". Total aid was increased to NZ$4.7 million (US$3.1 million) by 1 March, including a boost of NZ$1.5 million (US$1 million) immediately following McCully's visit. HMNZS Wellington arrived in Vanua Balavu with 60 tonnes of aid on 29 February, nine days after Winston struck the island. The larger HMNZS Canterbury arrived at the island several days later, bringing 270 NZDF personnel and 106 tons of supplies. The crew of the Canterbury were later praised by residents of Vanua Balavu for their rehabilitation work.

Australia provided an immediate relief package worth A$5 million (US$3.6 million) on 22 February, which increased to A$33.7 million (US$26.1 million) by 21 April HMAS Canberra, carrying three helicopters and 60 tons of aid, arrived on 1 March. Forty members of the Royal Australian Air Force were deployed to Nausori on 27 February, and twenty-two medical personnel were sent at other times. More than 200 personnel of the Australian Defence Forces assisted recovery efforts across Fiji for two months before returning home in April. France deployed two CASA/IPTN CN-235 aircraft from New Caledonia, loaded with emergency supplies; they flew along supply routes to Taveuni and Vanua Levu. On 9 March, the French patrol boat La Moqueuse arrived in Suva with 2 tonnes of supplies—shelter and hygiene kits—and 14 engineers. The Government of New Caledonia pledged FJ$300,000 (US$142,000) in support to UNICEF and the territory's South Province pledged FJ$400,000 (US$189,000) to support education.

=== Retirement ===
During November 2016, the WMO retired the name Winston due to the storm's extensive damage to the South Pacific islands and was subsequently replaced by the name Wanita.

== See also ==
- Weather of 2016
- Tropical cyclones in 2016
- List of the most intense tropical cyclones
- Cyclone Mahina (1899) – Potentially the most intense tropical cyclone recorded in the Southern Hemisphere
- Cyclone Oscar (1983)
- Cyclone Rewa (1993)
- Cyclone Zoe (2002) – The second-most intense tropical cyclone recorded in the South Pacific basin
- Cyclone Daman (2007)
- Cyclone Pam (2015)
- Cyclone Gita (2018)
- Cyclone Harold (2020)
