= Koro Island =

Island in Fiji

Koro
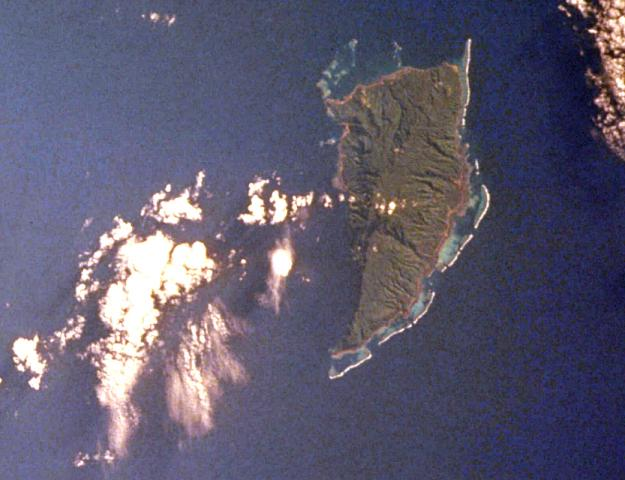
- Koro Island

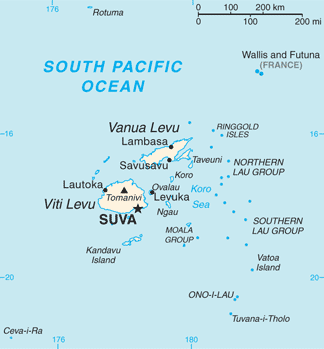
- Map of Fiji (Koro is in the centre)

- Location within Fiji

Geography
- Location: Fiji
- Coordinates: 17°18′00″S 179°24′00″E
- Archipelago: Lomaiviti
- Adjacent to: Koro Sea
- Total islands: 1
- Major islands: 1
- Area: 105.3 km^{2} (40.7 sq mi)
- Area rank: 7th
- Length: 17 km (10.6 mi)
- Highest elevation: 514 m (1686 ft)

Administration
- Fiji
- Division: Eastern
- Province: Lomaiviti Province
- Largest settlement: Nasau (pop. 451)

Demographics
- Population: 2,937 (2017)
- Pop. density: 42.735/km^{2} (110.683/sq mi)
- Ethnic groups: Native Fijians, Indo-Fijians; other (Asian, Europeans, other Pacific Islander)

Koro (lit. "village" in Fijian) is a volcanic island of Fiji that forms part of the Lomaiviti Archipelago. The Koro Sea is named after this volcanic island, which has a chain of basaltic cinder cones extending from north to south along its crest. With a land area of 105.3 square kilometres (40.7 mi^{2}), the 5-by-10-mile (8 by 16 km) island is the seventh largest in Fiji. Its latitude is 17.18° North; its longitude is 179.24° East. Its population as of the 2017 census was 2,830 spread across 14 villages on the island. Eight villages are in Mudu District on the east coast and six are in Cawa District on the west coast. A roll-on/roll-off ferry services Koro weekly from Suva and also connects Koro to Vanua Levu to the north. Fiji Link provides one scheduled flight per week to Koro, usually on Friday from Nausori Airport.

The island has an airport, Koro Airport, situated on its eastern coast. On its northwestern tip is situated the Dere Bay Resort and the Koro Beach Resort. A residential subdivision, Koro Seaview Estates was established around Dere Bay Resort in 1989 and about 60 homes have been established in the development as of 2009, including a reconstructed 300-year-old home imported from Java, Indonesia. Planting kava and selling copra are the major economic activities for villagers on Koro. Among Fijians, Koro is known as the most fertile island in Fiji, boasting large plantations and thriving tropical forests. Koro has an exceptional bird life and has been featured in numerous books. The village of Nacamaki on the northern side of the island does a traditional turtle calling ceremony during which villagers chant songs and turtles rise to the surface. The island has several small medical stations and schools up to a high school. A police post, Western Union and a post office are also on the island.

== History ==
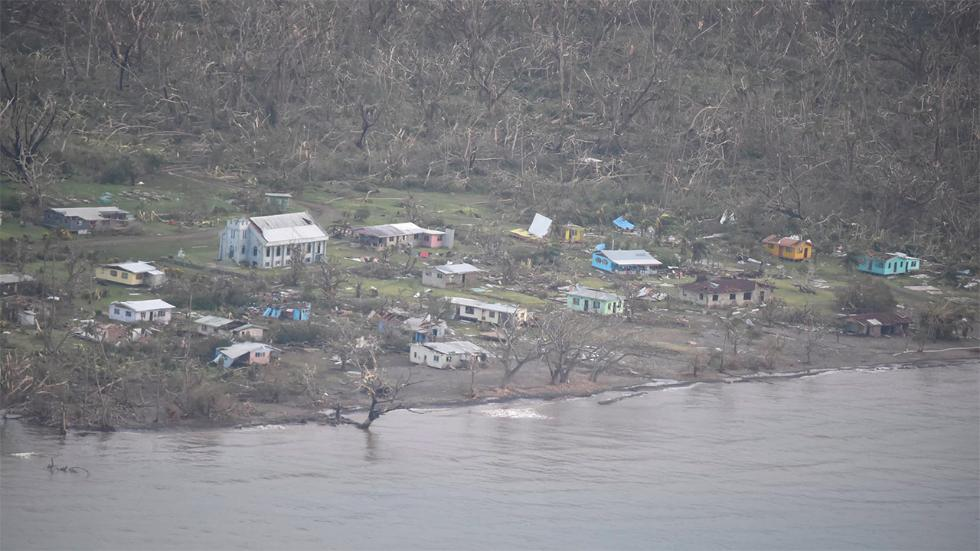
Nabuna village after Cyclone Winston

Prior to the arrival of Europeans, settlements were located away from the coast.

Captain William Bligh of HMS Bounty passed between the islands of Koro and Makogai in early May 1789, becoming the first European to discover them.

The American 2nd Marine Regiment of the 2nd Marine Division and part of the 1st Marine Division undertook landing rehearsals (Operation Dovetail) on Koro in July 1942 before deploying to Guadalcanal.

The short-lived 2002 American reality show Under One Roof was filmed on Koro Island. Koro Island was featured on Home and Garden TV's International House Hunters in 2009. The episode was filmed in May 2009.

Koro Island was severely impacted by Cyclone Winston in 2016.

== Transport ==
Ferry service by Patterson Brothers Shipping Company connects Koro to Viti Levu. The island has an airport, Koro Airport, situated on its eastern coast.

== See also ==
- List of volcanoes in Fiji
