= Kabara (Fiji) =

- Island and Tikina
- Location in Fiji
- Coordinates: 18°57′S 178°57′W
- Country: Fiji
- Island group: Southern Lau Islands

Area
  - Total: 32.75 km^{2} (12.64 sq mi)

Population (2017)
  - Total: 656
  - Density: 20.0/km^{2} (51.9/sq mi)

Kabara (pronounced [kamˈbara]) is an island of Fiji, a member of the Lau archipelago. With a land area of 32.75 km^{2} (12.64 sq mi), its population of around 660 live in four villages.

The islanders are noted for their craftsmanship in the area of wood carving. Vesi wood (Intsia bijuga), which grows natively on Kabara, is the traditional material, but deforestation has stripped the island, leaving only 8% of the island covered with Vesi trees as of 2005. A program of reforestation has been started, but as Vesi trees take 70–80 years to mature, carvers are being encouraged to use as little Vesi wood as possible. Sandalwood, known locally as yasi is being promoted as an alternative. Unlike Vesi, sandalwood takes only 30–40 years to mature.

The Fiji Village news service reported on 28 March 2006 that the World Wide Fund for Nature had donated thirteen 5,000-US-gallon (19,000 L) water tanks to Kabara, which would likely eliminate water shortages on the island.

Kabara was the first site promoted under the Climate Witness Programme in the Pacific.

A notable native from Kabara was the late wood carver Jone Lupe, whose family have been engaged in the craft for generations.
