= Lomaiviti Province =

Province of Fiji

Coordinates: 17°40′S 178°48′E

- Province
- Interactive map of Lomaiviti Province
- Country: Fiji
- Division: Eastern Division

Area
  - Total: 411 km^{2} (159 sq mi)

Population (2017)
  - Total: 15,657
  - Density: 38.1/km^{2} (98.7/sq mi)

Lomaiviti Province (Fijian pronunciation: [lomaiˈβitʃi]) is one of the 14 provinces of Fiji. Administratively, it forms part of Fiji's Eastern Division and of the Kubuna Confederacy, one of three traditional chiefly hierarchies in Fiji.

Geographically it consists of the Lomaiviti Islands and has a total land area of 411 square kilometers.

== Demographics ==
At the most recent census in 2017 it had a population of 15,657, making it the sixth least populous province.

=== 2017 Census ===
Tikina (District)	Ethnicity						Total
Tikina (District)	iTaukei	%	Indo-Fijian	%	Other	%	Total
Batiki	213	98.6	2	0.9	1	0.5	216
Gau	2,168	99.2	8	0.4	9	0.4	2,185
Koro	2,898	98.7	28	1.0	11	0.4	2,937
Lomaiviti Other Islands	220	95.7	8	3.5	2	0.9	230
Nairai	482	99.8	0	0.0	1	0.2	483
Ovalau	8,846	92.1	360	3.7	400	4.2	9,606
Province	14,827	94.7	406	2.6	424	2.7	15,657
