= Koro Sea =

Part of the southwestern Pacific Ocean

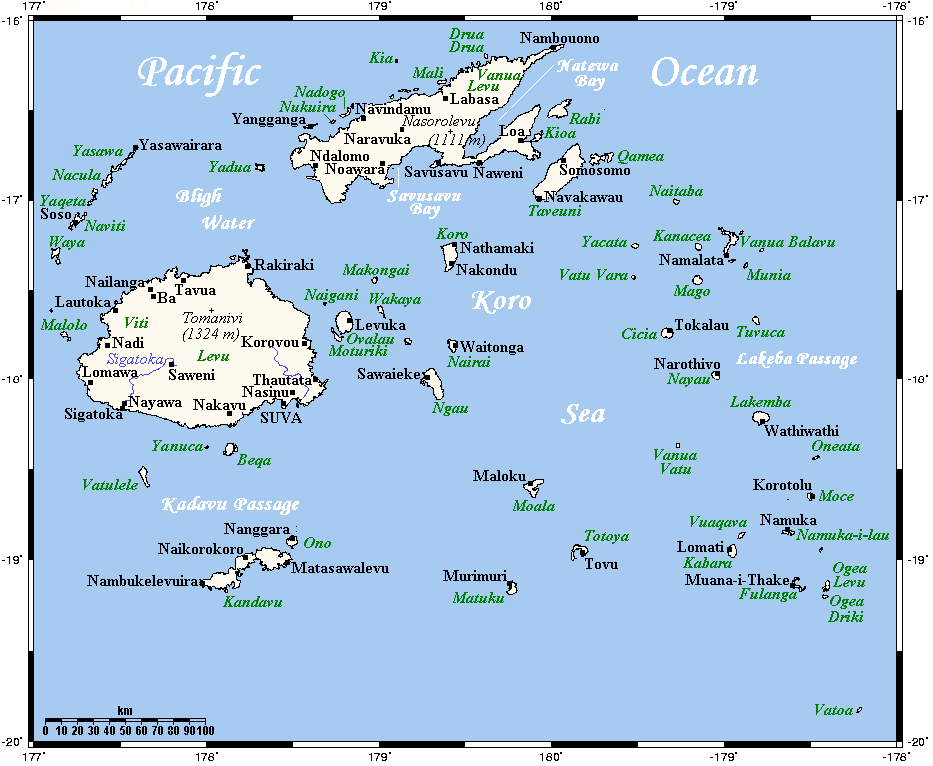
- Fiji map showing Koro Sea and Koro Island

- Location within Fiji
- Location: Pacific Ocean
- Coordinates: 18°S 180°E
- Type: Sea
- Basin countries: Fiji
- Surface area: 58,000 km^{2} (22,000 sq mi)
- Max. depth: 9,613 ft (2,930 m)

The Koro Sea or Sea of Koro is a sea in the Pacific Ocean surrounded by the islands of Fiji. It is named after Koro Island.

== Geography ==
The Koro Sea lies in the southwestern Pacific Ocean. It is surrounded by the more than 300 islands of Fiji, and is bordered by Viti Levu to the south, Vanua Levu and Taveuni to the north, Kadavu to the west, and the Lau Islands to the east. It is about 2,100 kilometres (1,300 mi; 1,100 nmi) north of Auckland, New Zealand. It is named after the volcanic island of Koro, an island of the Fijian archipelago located in the northwestern part of the Koro Sea.

== Physical description ==
The Koro Sea covers an area of about 58,000 square kilometres (22,000 sq mi; 17,000 sq nmi). It is relatively shallow: its maximum depth is 2,930 metres (9,613 ft), and on average its northern and western portions are shallower than its eastern portion. The seabed is formed by heavy basaltic rocks characteristic of ocean basins. Rocks, sandbars and numerous coral reefs between the islands occupy about 411 square kilometres (159 sq mi; 120 sq nmi) of the sea, making navigation possible only through a few narrow passages in its central portion.

The sea separates the two underwater platforms from which the Fiji Islands rise. An oceanic ridge that crosses the Nanuku Passage in the northwestern part of the sea connects the two platforms. The region has a high level of seismic activity.

== Climate ==
The entire Koro Sea lies in the tropics. Tropical air currents circulate over it all year round, although changes in air temperature with the change of season is documented. The trade winds predominate and tropical cyclones form in the warm season.

== Flora and fauna ==
The Koro Sea is part of the marine ecoregion of the Fiji Islands, which is included within the Central Indo-Pacific biogeographic region. In the field of zoogeography, the benthic fauna of the continental shelf and the sandbanks of the islands up to depths of 200 metres (656 ft) also corresponds to the Indo-Pacific biogeographic region within the tropical framework More than 300 species of hard corals, 1,500 of fish, and 7,000 of sea snails are found there.

== Transportation ==
Passenger ferries provide periodical service from the Koro Sea to Ovalau Island. The Nanuku Passage serves as a sea route for importing products into the Koro Sea region.

== Recreation ==
Scuba diving and snorkeling are possible in the Koro Sea but are not widely practiced because of the difficulty of safe navigation of its waters.
