= Eastern Division, Fiji =

Division of Fiji

Coordinates: 18°30′S 180°00′E

Eastern Division पूर्वी प्रभाग
- Division
- Map of Fiji showing Eastern division.
- Country: Fiji
- Capital: Levuka

Area
  - Total: 1,376 km^{2} (531 sq mi)

Population (2017)
  - Total: 36,156
  - Density: 26.28/km^{2} (68.05/sq mi)

The Eastern Division (Fiji Hindi: पूर्वी प्रभाग) is one of Fiji's four divisions. It consists of Kadavu Province, Lau Province, Lomaiviti Province and Rotuma.

The capital of the division is Levuka, on the Ovalau island. Other islands in the division include Kadavu, Gau, Koro, Nairai, Moala, Matuku, Vatu Vara, Naitaba, Mago, Cicia, Tuvuca, Lakeba, Vanua Vatu, Oneata, Vuaqava, Kabara, Moce, and Fulaga.

The division is the largest by area (including the sea), but has the smallest land area. The division has sea borders with Central, Northern and Western Divisions.
