= Gau Island =

Island in the Lomaiviti Islands, Fiji

Gau
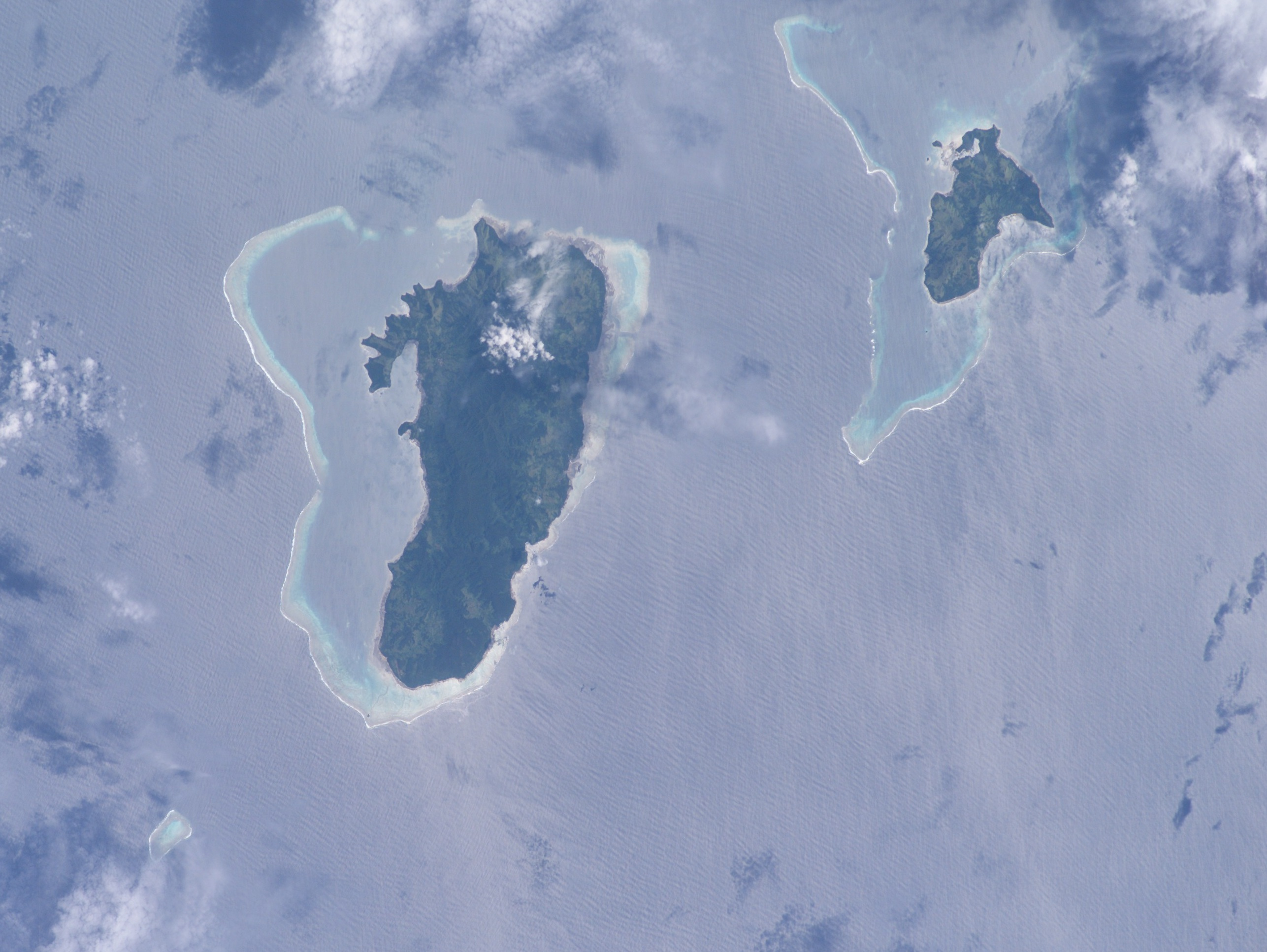
- A photo taken by NASA astronaut of Gau along with Nairai to the north-east
- Interactive map of Gau

Geography
- Location: South Pacific
- Archipelago: Lomaiviti Islands
- Area: 136.1 km^{2} (52.5 sq mi)
- Highest elevation: 738 m (2421 ft)

Administration
- Fiji
- Division: Eastern
- Province: Lomaiviti Province

Demographics
- Population: 2,185 (2017)

Gau (Fijian pronunciation: [ˈŋau], also known as Ngau in English) is an island belonging to Fiji's Lomaiviti archipelago. Located at 18.00° S and 179.30 °E, it covers an area of 136.1 square kilometres (52.5 square miles), with a total shoreline that measures 66.3 kilometres (41.2 miles) long, making it the fifth largest island in the Fijian archipelago. Its maximum elevation is 738 metres (2,421 ft). To the north-west is Batiki, and to the north-east is Nairai.

== Geography ==
There are 16 villages on the island: Yadua, Vadra Vadra, Lovu, Levuka-i-Gau, Nukuloa, Nawaikama, Somosomo, Sawaieke (the chiefly village), Navukailagi, Qarani, Vione, Lekanai, Vanuaso, Nacavanadi, Malawai and Lamiti. Most of the island's residents live near the coast, and few live in the interior. Travel between villages is mostly by sea or on the coast road. It has one airstrip at Lovu, on the southern tip of the island, which receives planes from Nausori International Airport. There is one secondary school on the island in Nawaikama, which also hosts hot springs nearby. Gau Island is widely regarded as having one of the best kava (yaqona) strains in Fiji.

== Ecology ==
About 55% of the island is covered in dense rain forest, mostly on the windward southern and western sides of the island and in the central highlands. The eastern shore and the northern and southern tips of the island are covered in grassland or reed, with some plantations of introduced Caribbean pine (Pinus caribaea). Ridge thicket, a low-growing cloud forest with a tree canopy of 7 meters or lower, grows along the central ridge and extends as low as 200 meters elevation on windy ridges on the island's southern and western slopes. Ridge thicket is characterised by abundant large ferns including the tree ferns Cyathea spp. and Leptopteris wilkesiana, the climbing vines Freycinetia spp., and limited-range species like the palm Physokentia petiolata, which only occurs on Gau and the highlands of Viti Levu.

The Gau Highlands Important Bird Area is an area covering the entire forested interior (just over 50% of the entire island) and measures 5,200 hectares (13,000 acres). It contains populations of the critically endangered Fiji petrel, and vulnerable shy ground-dove and collared petrel. The Fiji petrel's nesting habitat on the island contributes to its national significance as outlined in Fiji's Biodiversity Strategy and Action Plan.

A marine research facility was established on Naviavia beach on the western coast of Gau in 2005 by the UK-based non-governmental organization Frontier, commissioned by Dr. Joeli Veitayaki of the University of South Pacific, a native of Malawai on the eastern coast.

== Notable people ==
The first King of Fiji Seru Epenisa Cakobau grew up on the island, despite being born on the nearby island Nairai. Manasa Tabuadua {Great Council of Chiefs}
