= Cikobia-i-Ra =

Fijian island

Thikombia
Native name: Cikobia-i-Ra
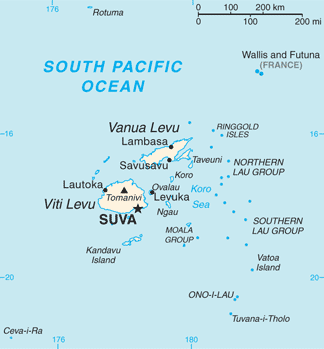

- Location within Fiji

Geography
- Location: South Pacific Ocean
- Coordinates: 15.735291°S 179.9576379°W
- Archipelago: Vanua Levu Group

Administration
- Fiji
- Division: Eastern Division
- Province: Macuata Province

Demographics
- Population: 100 (2017)

Cikobia-i-Ra, also Thikombia Island, Tchecombia and Tikobia, is the northernmost island in Macuata Province, Fiji and has a primarily limestone geology. As the island is affected by climate change, women there have established the Cikobia Island Development Committee, which supports businesses that donate some profit to sustainability initiatives. The island has some of the earliest evidence for Lapita culture in the Pacific, as well as significant archaeological sites.

== Geography ==
Located to the north of Vanua Levu in Macuata Province in Fiji, Cikobia-i-Ra is 300 km to the northeast of Suva. The island is 10 km long and 2km wide; it is 60 km from the northernmost point of Vanua Levu. It is primarily made from uplifted limestone formations.

Settlements on Cikobia-i-Ra include Nalele, Nautovatu and Vatulele.

== Climate crisis ==
Cikobia-i-Ra is the northernmost and the most remote of the islands in the Northern Division. The island has been affected by the climate crisis, including an increase in the number of natural disasters. In response, women from the island established the Cikobia Island Development Committee, which enables women to start businesses based on natural resources available to them. This then enables the women to return 10% of their earnings to sustainability projects on the island, so that "10 per cent of their earnings had been channelled towards their environment sustainability project."

== History ==
The island was first settled around 850 BC by people who were part of the Eastern Lapita cultural complex. According to oral tradition, Cikobia-i-Ra was settled by Manaoneata and his son Iri-ni-buno, who came from Laucala in Cakaudrove. One of Manaoneata's sons settled later on Naqelelevu. Other accounts, recorded by Bruce Biggs, state that a chief called Sau Mata-i-walu spent time in Cikobia-i-Ra before discovering Naqelelevu.

Cikobia-i-Ra's language is most closely related to Naqelelevu's and exchanges between the two islands and the island of Futuna have been reconstructed through linguistic analysis.

=== Korotuku complex ===
At Korotuku a defensive fort was built, which contained ninety different structures, as well as burials. In 1997 a team of archaeologists from Fiji and France investigated the archaeological remains on the island. They identified twenty-five funerary sites on the island, most of which related to the historic period (c.1850), and whose history is attested in the island's oral culture. The team excavated ten interments, which included two children and eight adults, five of whom could be identified as males, two of which females. A number of grave goods were found, including glass trade beads, a qato – which is an armband made of Trochus shell, a boar's tusk, a shark's tooth and a coral object which was tentatively identified as part of a tabua – a ceremonial object which accompanied a person into the afterlife. It is likely that the bodies were wrapped in tapa prior to burial. A later study used stable isotope analysis to examine the diets of those buried there, concluding that they ate a diet based primarily on vegetal food, with some shellfish consumption, which has been interpreted as dietary selection which may indicate those buried were part of an island elite.

As part of the archaeological work instigated in 1997, Fijian colleagues undertook oral history work with the island's community to better understand the site. In response, islanders began to rebuild one of the fortifications, known as Rukunikoro. Years after work ended, families still tended the project, explaining that they preferred to keep tourists away, that it was for themselves, not for others.

Glass beads have been excavated from graves on the island, which originated in Europe in the nineteenth century and may have been brought to the island by American whalers or European sailors, during the period of colonisation.

=== Intangible heritage ===
The Archive of Māori and Pacific Sound at the University of Auckland holds recordings made on the island by Bruce Biggs in 1974.

== Notable people ==
- Penina Namata, advisor to Cikobia Island Development Committee.
