= Vorovoro =

Island in Fiji

- Location within Fiji

Geography
- Location: South Pacific Ocean
- Coordinates: 16.3428631°S 179.3094992°E
- Archipelago: Vanua Levu Group

Administration
- Fiji
- Division: Eastern
- Province: Macuata
- District: Macuata

Vorovoro is an island in the province of Macuata in the Vanua Levu Group of northern Fiji, 40 minutes away from the town of Labasa by boat.

Vorovoro island is inhabited by the Mali tribe, a traditional Fijian tribe which also has villages nearby on both Mali Island and Vanua Levu. Vorovoro is home to Tui Mali (the Chief of the Mali Tribe) and his family, as well as the Vorovoro Cultural Centre.

== Natural resources ==
Vorovoro is located just off Cakaulevu Reef, the third-longest barrier reef in the world, and is situated by the head of the Mali Passage, a major channel through the reef. While the reef was historically used for fishing, it is now the focus of several conservation efforts.

In 2018, Vorovoro's abundant natural resources and fight against the threats posed by climate change were featured in an article Too Much Seawater; Too Little Drinking Water in The Washington Post after a Post reporter visited the island. The article has helped to shed light on Vorovoro and has served as a spark for future tourism development.

== History and archaeology ==
Archeological survey in northeastern Vanua Levu in 2009 discovered an early Lapita settlement site on Vorovoro Island. In July 2010, a small crew from Simon Fraser University and the Fiji Museum conducted fieldwork to assess the integrity of archaeological deposits, their extent, the material culture record, and chronology. This study was undertaken with the approval of Tui Mali as well as the Macuata Provincial Office.

The Vorovoro Island site was noted as having an occupation beginning with initial Lapita settlement and continuing, at least intermittently, until the present. Tui Mali and his family currently reside there, notably constituting a hamlet much like that anticipated in prehistory. Intriguingly, traditional history of Tui Mali and the Mali people claim Vorovoro as a founding settlement, following which they populated Mali Island as the population grew. This oral tradition is strikingly correspondent with the archaeological record of Vorovoro as recorded in 2010.

As a result of this study, a paper was published in the Journal of Pacific Archaeology Vol. 3. No. 1. This paper notes that:

Intentional exploration as a systemic and strategic process in the Lapita settlement of Oceania is difficult to identify in archaeological context. An early Lapita site on Vorovoro Island, off the northeast coast of Vanua Levu, Fiji, provides potential insight in this respect. The island...was as a landmark and base for exploration of the northern Vanua Levu coast. Radiocarbon dates indicate this took place contemporaneous with, and probably as an extension of first Lapita settlement in western Viti Levu c. 3000–3100 calBP.

Further academic discourse on Vorovoro surmises that the Vorovoro site could suggest "an almost immediate exploration of Fiji out of the western Viti Levu founder colony", or perhaps even "might alternatively indicate a separate migration and founder event in Northern Fiji itself." Fijian Polygenesis and the Melanesian/Polynesian Divide, David V. Burley, Current Anthropology, Vol. 54, No. 4 (August 2013). As such, it has enormous archaeological significance as researchers continue to investigate the intimal settlement of Fiji.

== Partnerships ==
Between 2006 and 2011 the island was rented by Tribewanted, a self-described "unique community tourism project". During this time, the island and the project received extensive media coverage, including a five-part BBC documentary called Paradise or Bust.

In 2012, the Mali community began a partnership with Bridge the Gap. Bridge the Gap partners with Vorovoro in the planning and execution of Vorovoro's community development goals and to bolster Vororovo's global outreach opportunities while maintaining the integrity of the tribe's rich cultural heritage and working to protect the local natural environment. The partnership uses a multipronged approach for reaching these development goals. This approach includes business mentorship programs, sustainable agricultural training, infrastructure support, and networking with various international organizations.

However, the most unique approach may be the formation of a Fijian-run eco-tourism business; facing pressures to develop Vorovoro island into a profitable tourism enterprise owned and managed by foreign investors, Vorovoro leadership had wanted a way to retain control of their traditional community home. By opening their home to a limited number of (predominately student) visitors each year, the people of Vorovoro have been able to take control of tourism on their land while creating a source of income for the Mali community, including a partnership with the Auburn University College of Human Sciences to develop and offer a unique, accredited study abroad program focused on cultural immersion, environmental awareness, and global sustainability.
