= Namena Lala =

Volcanic islet in Fiji

Coordinates: 17°06′36″S 179°06′00″E

Native name: Namenalala
- Location within Fiji

Geography
- Location: Koro Sea; South Pacific Ocean
- Archipelago: Vanua Levu Group
- Area: 4 km^{2} (1.5 sq mi)
- Highest elevation: 105 m (344 ft)

Administration
- Fiji
- Division: Northern Division
- Province: Bua
- District: Wainunu

Namena Lala (sometimes spelt Namenalala) is a volcanic islet in Fiji, an outlier to the northern island of Vanua Levu (off Wainunu Bay), 24 kilometres (15 miles) away. Situated at 17.11° South and 179.10° East, it covers an area of 4 square kilometres (990 acres). Its maximum altitude is 105 metres (340 ft). The island is the site of the 0.44 square kilometres (110 acres) Namenalala Island resort and nature reserve.

A 52 hectares (130 acres) area of the island is the Namenalala Important Bird Area. It supports a population of vulnerable Shy Ground-dove. The sea bird nesting colony and beach forest of the island contribute to its national significance as outlined in Fiji's Biodiversity Strategy and Action Plan.

== Cyclone Winston ==
In February 2016, tropical Cyclone Winston hit Namena and caused huge damage to the island and its reef. However, the reef had recovered itself in a couple of years time.
