= Rainbow Reef =

Coordinates: 16.7770°S 179.9322°E

The Rainbow Reef is a reef in the Somosomo Strait between the Fijian islands of Taveuni and Vanua Levu. It is one of the most famous dive sites in the South Pacific. The Great White Wall is a popular scuba diving site. It is named because of the white coral inhabiting the area at depths between 15 and 65 metres (49 and 213 ft).

The patch reef and marine ecosystem of the reef contribute to its national significance as outlined in Fiji's Biodiversity Strategy and Action Plan.
