= Taveuni (disambiguation) =

Taveuni is an island.

Taveuni may also refer to:

- Taveuni (volcano)
- Taveuni District
