= Somosomo =

Chiefly village in Taveuni, Fiji

- Village
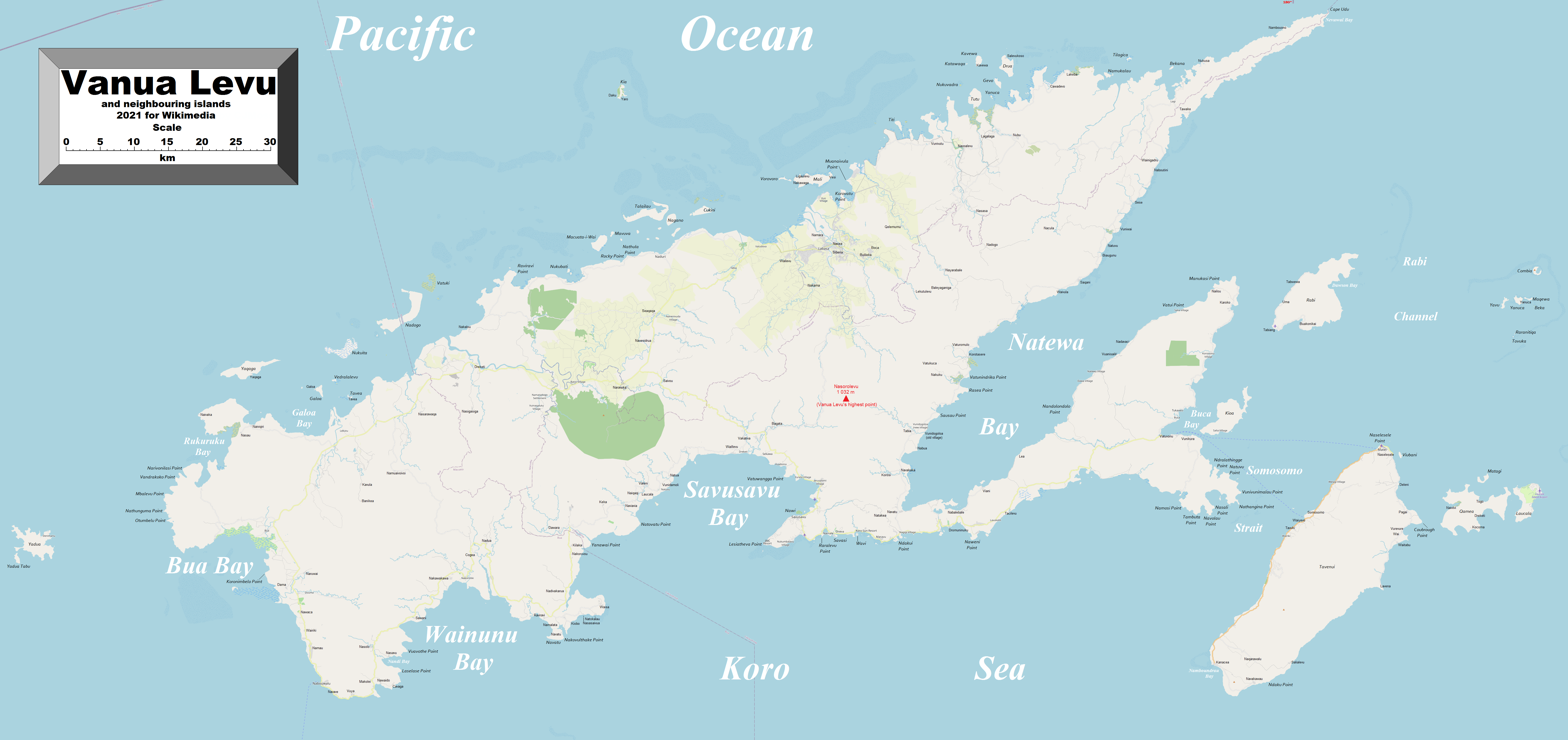
- Vanua Levu and Taveuni with Somosomo in Taveuni's northwest

- Location in Fiji
- Country: Fiji
- Island: Taveuni
- Division: Northern Division
- Province: Cakaudrove
- Time zone: UTC+12

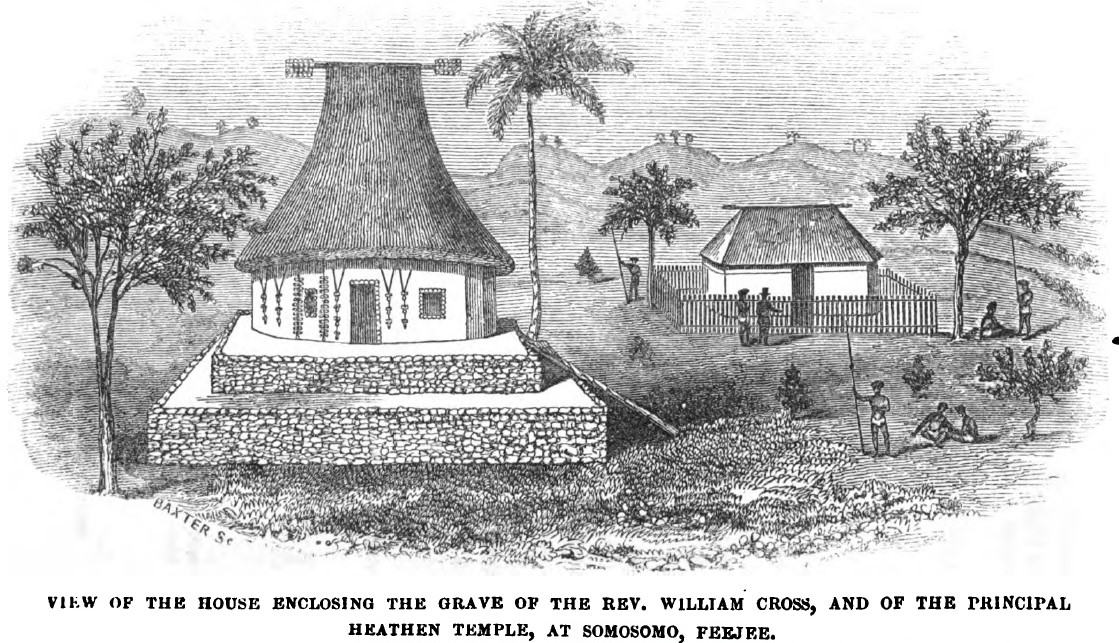
View of the house enclosing the grave of Rev. William Cross, and the principal heathen temple, at Somosomo, Feejee (IV, November 1847, p.120)

Somosomo (Fijian pronunciation: [somosomo]) is a chiefly village in Taveuni, which is the island where the 180th meridian crosses on land in Fiji. Divided from Vanua Levu by Somosomo Strait, this island is part of the Cakaudrove Province and the holders of the title of Tui Cakau, the Paramount Chief of the Tovata Confederacy, are historically and traditionally linked to this village.

The island was visited by the US Exploring Expedition in 1840.

In 1873, work commenced on a double-canoe called Ramarama at Somosomo, which was 99 feet (30 m) in length with a crew of 50 paddlers, although the vessel could carry an additional 200 warriors. Her steer oars were 34 feet (10 m). The builders included Manase Gauamo, an expert Tongan canoe maker, who worked for five years to complete Ramarama. The double-canoe was built for the Tui Cakau, who later gave Ramarama to Seru Epenisa Cakobau. The double-canoe made three voyages to Tonga.

== Famous persons from Somosomo ==
Fiji's first President, Penaia Ganilau, was Tui Cakau and therefore a native of Somosomo.

Chief Komaibatiniwai was from the noble family of Somosomo.

Rugby league player Semi Radradra hails from the village.

== Mythology ==
According to the myth, the god who ruled over this village is Qurai. There is a short discussion of traditional religion as practiced on Somosomo in J. G. Frazer's famous work, The Golden Bough. Frazer describes belief in a continuity of divine nature between humans and deities, in which certain priests and chiefs were considered to be "sacred persons."
