= Coqeloa =

Village in Macuata Province, Fiji

- Village
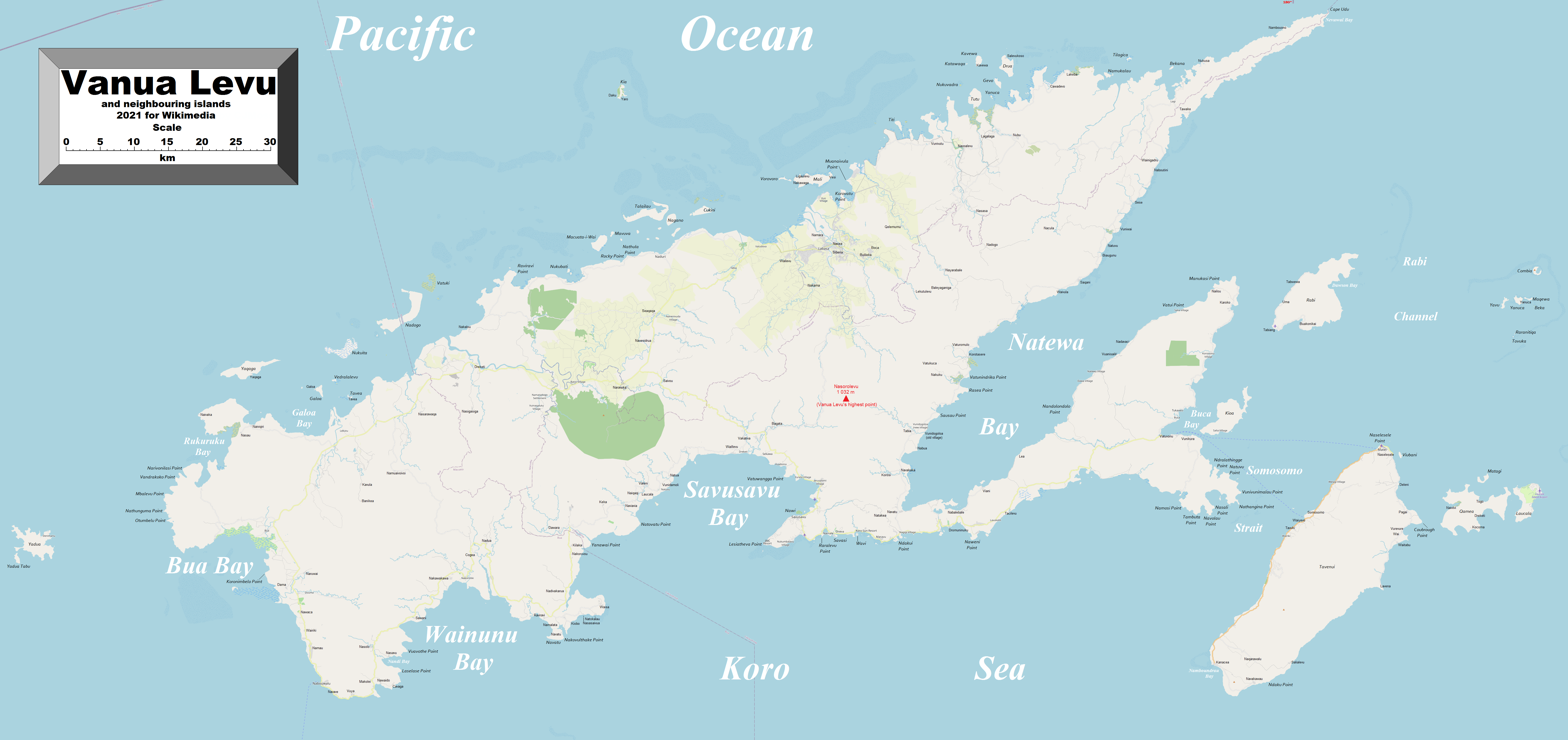
- Vanua Levu

- Location in Fiji
- Country: Fiji
- Island: Vanua Levu
- Division: Northern Division
- Province: Macuata

Population (2009)
  - Total: 1,000
- Time zone: UTC+12

Coqeloa (Fijian pronunciation: [ðoŋɡeloa]) is a small village in Macuata Province, Fiji, on the island of Vanua Levu. It has a population of about 1,000. It is located 30 kilometres (19 mi) from Labasa and the trip takes around 50 minutes by bus.

The main sport in Coqeloa is soccer.

It has one school, Coqeloa Sangam School.

The water supply system in Coqeloa Central and Coqeloa Number Three settlements was improved and expanded in 2017, ensuring the access to clean and safe drinking water for the residents. Waiwari settlement gained access to the same in 2022.
