= Vanua Levu Group =

Archipelago in northern Fiji

Coordinates: 16°35′S 179°11′E

The Vanua Levu Group is an archipelago in northern Fiji. It takes its name from its predominant island, Vanua Levu. Among the other island in the group, the most important is Taveuni. Other islands in the group include Laucala, Matagi, Namena Lala, Qamea, Rabi, Vorovoro and Yadua Tabu. They have an aggregate area of 6,199 square kilometres (2,393 square miles), with a total population of 140,016 at the 1996 census, the last held.

The Vanua Levu Group is coextensive with Fiji's Northern Division, one of four into which the country is divided for local government purposes. Together with the remote Lau Islands, they form the Tovata Confederacy, one of three chiefly hierarchies.
