= Matagi Island =

Island in Fiji

Matagi
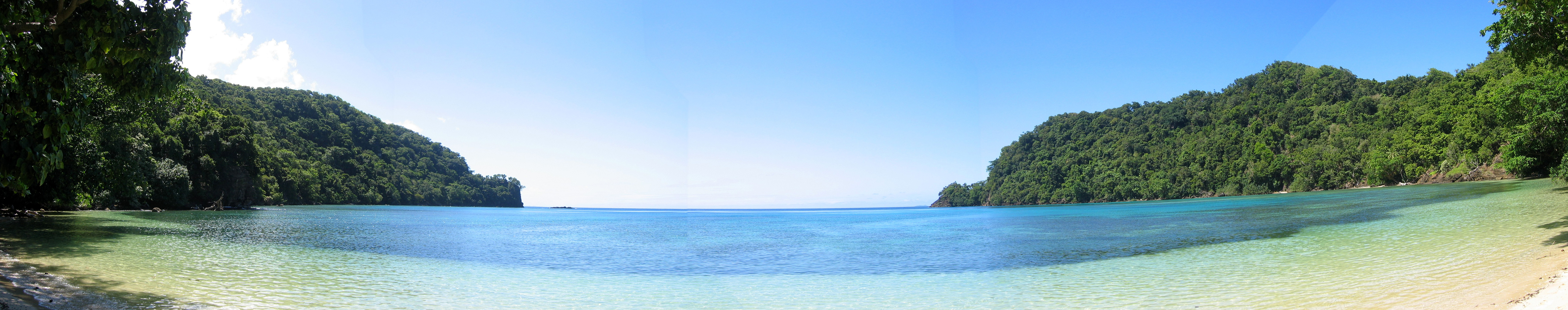
- A view from the beach of Horseshoe Bay on Matagi Island

- Location within Fiji

Geography
- Location: South Pacific Ocean
- Coordinates: 16.7302592°S 179.7488916°W
- Archipelago: Vanua Levu Group
- Adjacent to: Koro Sea
- Area: 0.97 km^{2} (0.37 sq mi)

Administration
- Fiji
- Division: Northern
- Province: Cakaudrove
- Tikina: Wainikeli

Matagi (pronounced [maˈtaŋi]), sometimes written Matangi, is an island the Vanua Levu Group in northern Fiji, situated 16°44 South 179° West. It is one of three tiny volcanic islands grouped to the east of Thurston Point on the island of Taveuni, the others being Qamea and Laucala. The horseshoe-shaped islet of 97 hectares (240 acres) lies 10 kilometers (6.2 mi) east of Thurston Point. Inaccessible until recently, this privately owned island has been turned into an up-market resort. Apart from diving, activities include fishing, windsurfing, sailing, water-skiing, and snorkelling. There is a speedboat link between Matagi and Taveuni.

The beach forest and flooded volcanic caldera of the island contribute to its national significance as outlined in Fiji's Biodiversity Strategy and Action Plan.

== History ==
It is believed the Fiji Islands were first settled about 3,500 years ago. In 1643, Dutch Navigator Abel Tasman was the first European to discover Fiji's Northern group of islands including Matagi Island. A whole century had passed before the next explorer came into contact with the “Cannibal Isles”, as Fiji was known then. During this period, conflict and warfare between Fiji's indigenous tribes, and attempts by the nearby Tongan islanders to occupy the Eastern part of Fiji were rife. Early settlers at this time were a mixture of shipwrecked sailors, whalers, “Blackbirders”, missionaries and traders of mostly sandalwood, sea cucumber and turtle shell.

In 1874, an offer of cession by the Fijian Chiefs at that time was accepted, and Fiji was proclaimed a possession and dependency of the British Crown. In 1878, the island was owned by Frederick Mitchell who at that time owned half of Qamea, Laucala Island and Matagi Island. Frederick Mitchell, an immigrant and businessman from Australia used the island as a copra farm and on the island of Qamea used that as a cotton plantation. Mitchell, at the time, was in Levuka on the island of Ovalau during the vere vakabau (Bauan term for deception or plotting) against the Lovoni people. The Lovoni were held and paraded around Levuka Town as barbarians, and the captured people of Lovoni were sold into slavery to rich planters around the country, in which Mitchell also partaked. One of the slavers was to become his wife; she was the daughter of the Tui Wailevu of Lovoni – Adi Matila Nakaiviwa. They had 3 children – Flora Mitchell, Frank Mitchell and Ella Mitchell. When Frederick Mitchell died, his land was willed to his wife and when she died, the land was given to her three children; Frank got Qamea Island, Flora who married Joseph Smith got Silana in Levuka, and Ella the youngest Daughter got Matagi Island. Because Ella and her husband did not have children, the land was given to Flora's son Stanley who was brought up on Matagi and was Ella's husband's namesake Stanley Smith who came from England. Two brothers Smith married the two Mitchell ladies. Over the years, Stanley Smith eventually sold the island to his brother Fredrick Smith who married Zillah Whitcombe, and the couple created a copra plantation on the island. They had two daughters, Flora and Penelope (known as Chick), who are the current trustees of the island. Flora Smith married Noel Douglas, a 4th generation Taveuni planter of Scottish and Irish descent. In 1986 Noel and Flora discontinued the plantation and developed the 240-acre Matangi Private Island Resort.

== Climate ==
Climate is warm and tropical year-round, even in the islands’ “winter” months. The average temperature in Fiji is 25 °C (77 °F), but it can climb to above 30 °C (86 °F) in summer (December and January) and sink to 18 °C (64 °F) in winter (July and August). The trade winds, which blow from the southeast, usually prevail from May to October (the drier winter months). In December and January, the winds often shift and come from the east, bringing rainfall with them.
