= Taveuni =

Island in Fiji

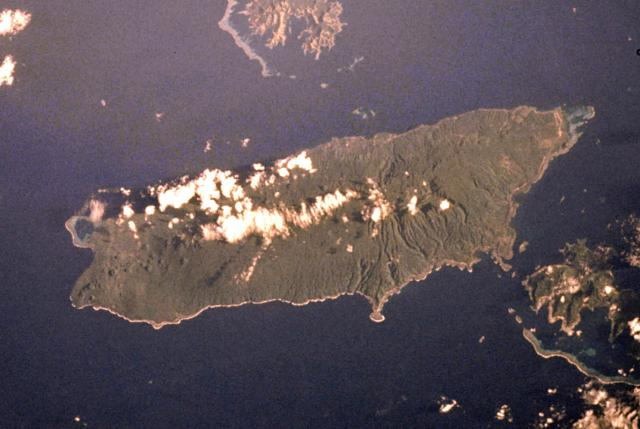
- NASA Space Shuttle image of Taveuni. Top of image is NW.

- Location in Fiji Taveuni (Oceania)

Geography
- Location: South Pacific Ocean
- Coordinates: 16°48′S 180°00′E
- Archipelago: Vanua Levu Group
- Adjacent to: Koro Sea
- Area: 434 km^{2} (168 sq mi)
- Area rank: 3rd
- Length: 42 km (26.1 mi)
- Width: 10–14 km (6.2–8.7 mi)
- Highest elevation: 1,241 m (4072 ft)
- Highest point: Mount Uluigalau

Administration
- Fiji
- Division: Northern
- Province: Cakaudrove
- Largest settlement: Waiyevo

Demographics
- Population: 13,774 (2017)

Taveuni (pronounced [tāhvéuni]) is the third-largest island in Fiji, after Viti Levu and Vanua Levu, with a total land area of 434 square kilometres (168 square miles). The cigar-shaped island, a massive shield volcano which rises from the floor of the Pacific Ocean, is situated 6.5 kilometres (4.0 miles) east of Vanua Levu, across the Somosomo Strait. It belongs to the Vanua Levu Group of islands and is part of Fiji's Cakaudrove Province within the Northern Division.

The island's population is estimated to be between 12,000 (Note: Attributed to multiple sources:) and 20,000, with the official estimate being 13,774 in the 2017 Fijian census. Over 80% of the island's population are indigenous Fijians.

== Geography ==
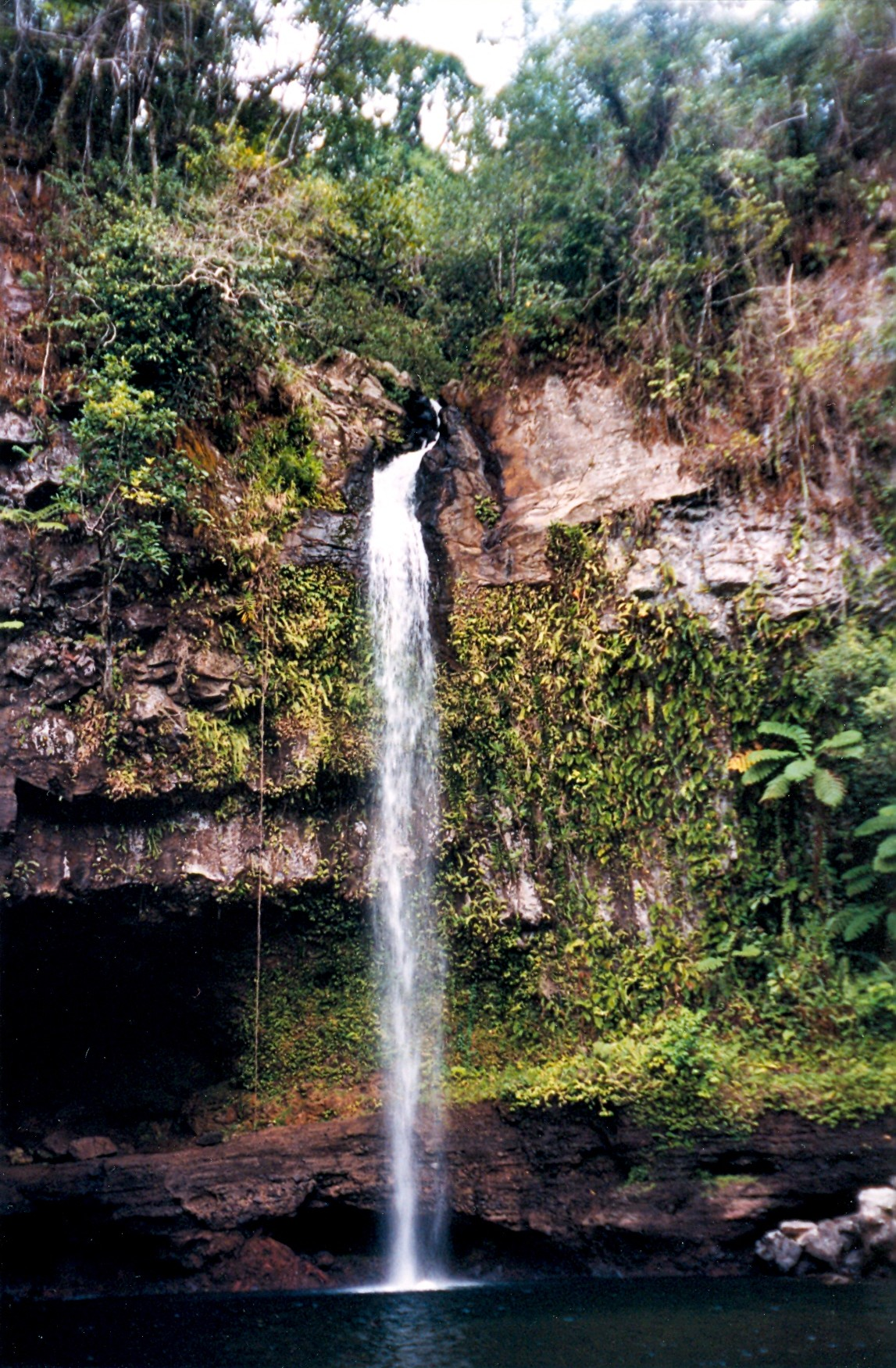
Bouma Falls, 1998

Taveuni is located at the northern end of the Koro Sea, and is entirely the product of volcanic activity. Fiji's third largest island is separated from Vanua Levu by the Somosomo Strait. The island is between 10 and 14 kilometres (6 and 9 miles) wide and 42 km (26 mi) long, representing the top of a dormant, elongated shield volcano which erupted from a northeast–southwest trending rift on the ocean floor. About 150 volcanic cones dot the island, including Uluigalau, Fiji's second highest peak at 1,241 metres (4,072 feet), and Des Vœux Peak, next in height at 1,195 metres (3,921 feet). There have been at least 58 volcanic eruptions since the first human settlement around 950–750 BC, all of which affected the southern two-thirds of the island. Major eruptions from 300 to 500 AD caused abandonment of the southern areas until about 1100 AD. The latest eruption produced a lava flow at the southern tip of the island around 1550. The island's central ridge delineates the greatest volcanic activity surrounding volcanic vents.

Lake Tagimaucia is one of Taveuni's most famous tourist attractions. It occupies a volcanic crater at an altitude of 800 metres (2,600 feet), and is the habitat of the rare tagimaucia flower. Fiji's most famous waterfalls, the Bouma Falls, are also on the island, located in the Bouma National Heritage Park. South of Vuna village and the lagoon, jet black rocks litter an area known as the South Cape where Taveuni's last volcanic eruption spilled into the sea around 500 years ago. The highlight of the region is the Matamaiqi blowhole with geysers created by trade winds crashing against the volcanic rocks. About 20 minutes on foot from the town of Waiyevo is the Waitavala Waterslide. This entirely natural streambed chute plummets for about 50 metres down the lush hillside and is a favourite haunt for local children and brave tourists. In eastern Taveuni the Savulevu Yavonu Waterfall empties into the ocean. Tavoro Creek, Somosomo Creek, Waimbula River and the islands most notable waterways.

Many of Taveuni's best known attractions lie underwater. There are three major, distinct diving areas around the island. To the north of Taveuni lie in close proximity the islands of Qamea and Matagi with their surrounding reef systems. The Rainbow Reef and Vuna Reef are famous for diving and snorkeling, respectively. The Rainbow Reef, on the western side of the narrow Somosomo Strait between Taveuni and Vanua Levu, is known as one of the world's premier soft coral dive areas and the soft coral capital of the world The horseshoe-shaped Vuna Lagoon, near the southern end of the island, is much appreciated by divers for the opportunity to see larger pelagic and schooling fish species on the exposed southern side of the reef, whereas the sheltered western parts provide pristine soft and hard coral gardens. Migrating humpback whales pass the island in July.

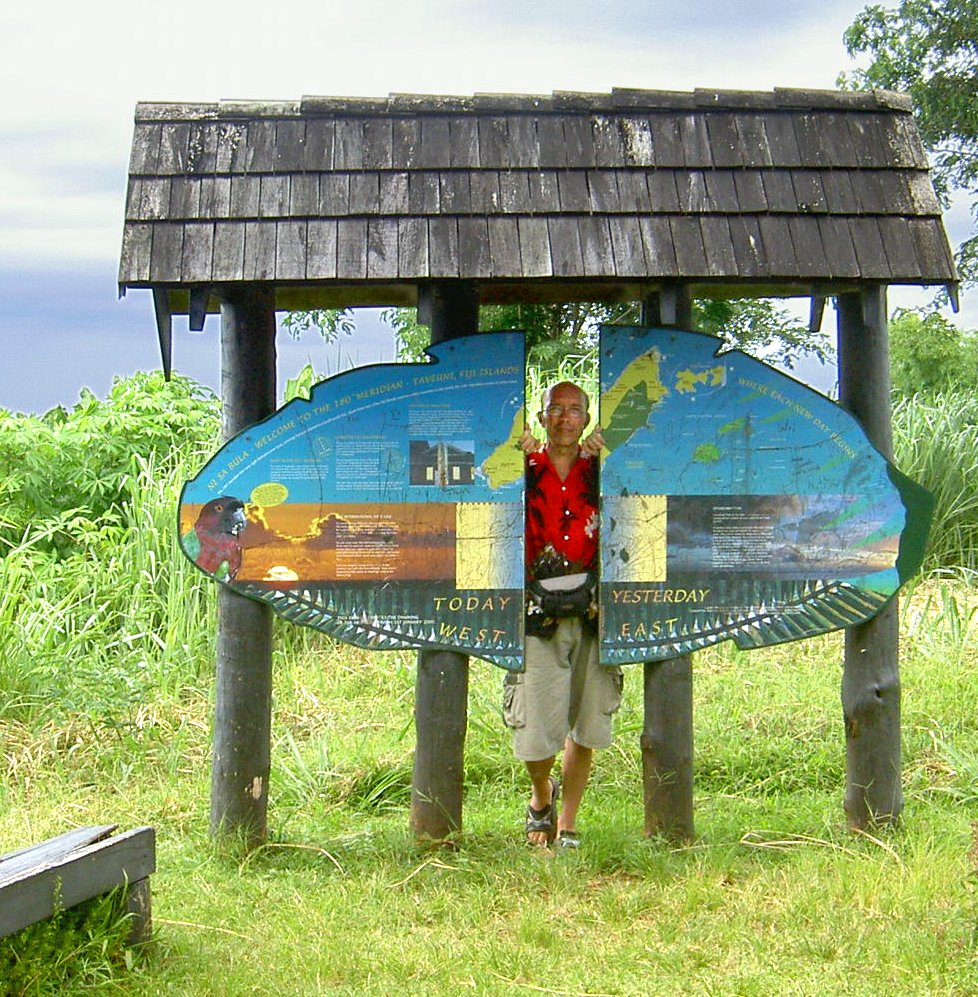
Sign "Between Yesterday And Today" at 180th meridian in Taveuni, marking the "International Date Line". Note that this is not the real location of the Date Line, which deviates from the meridian to pass entirely east of Fiji.

The island of Taveuni crosses the 180th meridian, so the "north-eastern" portion of the island is located at 179 degrees west (-179 degrees longitude) and the south-western part at 179 degrees east (+179 degrees longitude)). This is a case that often causes havoc to GIS software, in which a polygon geometry around the perimeter of the island is incorrectly rendered and wraps around the globe.

To protect Fiji's wildlife, two sanctuaries have been created on the island of Taveuni: the Ravilevu Nature Reserve on the east coast, and the Taveuni Forest Reserve in the middle of the island. The potential to be nominated as a World Heritage Site contributes to the island's national significance, as outlined in Fiji's Biodiversity Strategy and Action Plan.

=== Settlements ===
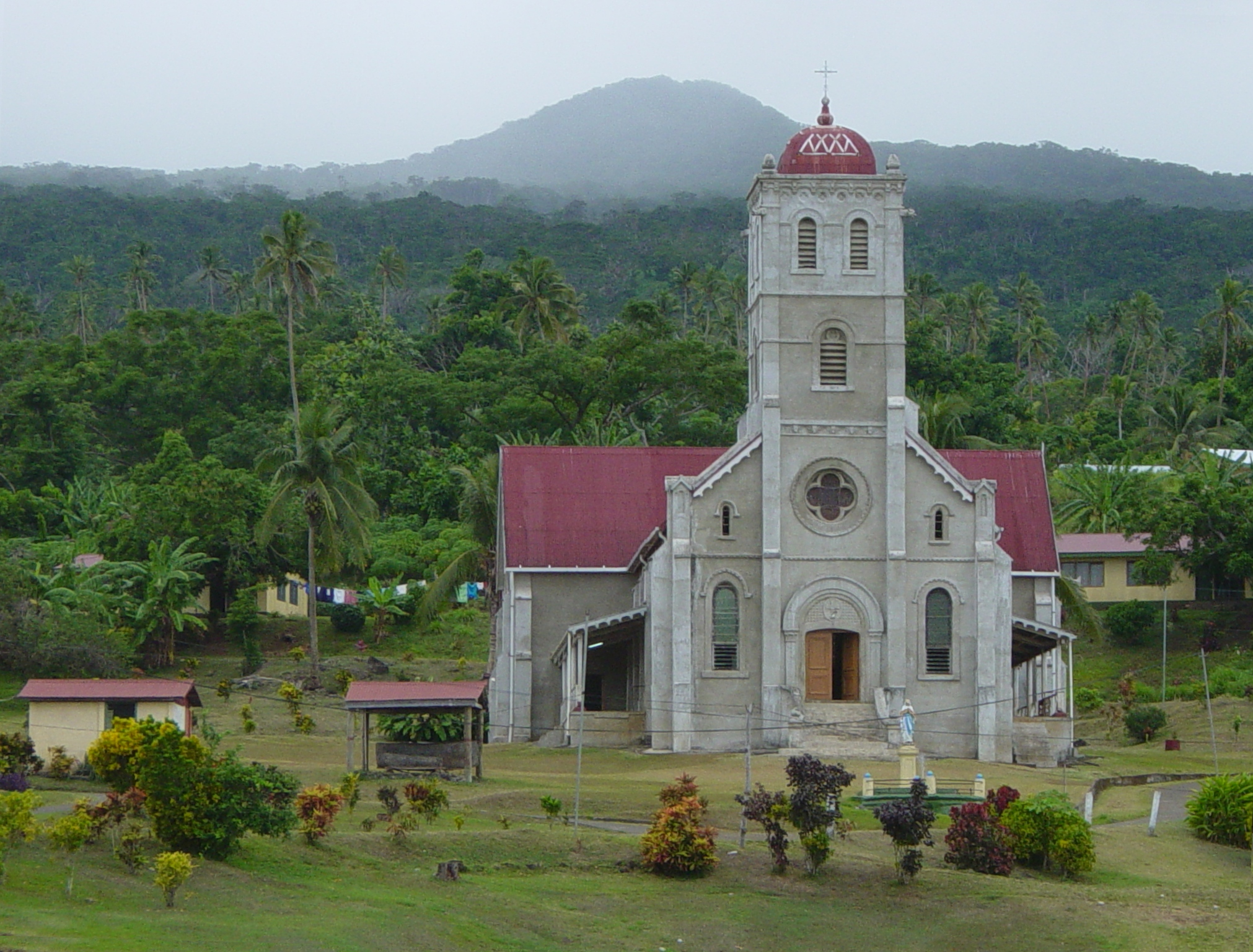
Wairiki Mission, 2003

The population is concentrated mostly on the more sheltered western side of the island. Taveuni has eight major villages. Halfway down the west coast is the administrative centre of Waiyevo. The largest urban area, however, comprises the twin villages of Somosomo and Naqara. As the traditional fiefdom of the Tui Cakau, one of Fiji's highest-ranked chiefs, Somosomo is regarded as the capital of the Tovata Confederacy, while Naqara, an Indo-Fijian settlement, is the island's commercial centre. The main hospital is located at Waiyevo while a number of nursing stations and health centres are located around the island. Other settlements include Bouma, Deleni, Gacaavulu, Kanacea, Korovou, Lavena, Matei, Naselesele, Navakawau, Salialevu, Soqulu, Vuna, Wairiki, and Welagi.

=== Climate ===
The climate of Taveuni and Fiji is tropical without temperate extremes. It has been described as typical highland. Between November and April, the area is prone to tropical cyclones. Rainfall rates on the island are high because the central mountains produce precipitation by orographic uplift. As much as 10 metres (33 feet) of rain falls annually on the eastern side of the island, but the western side is sheltered from the southeast trade winds by the ridge that runs the length of the island. The central ridge experiences a wet upland climate which supports montane and submontane forests. Near Mount Koroturanga, 9,970 mm of mean, annual rainfall has been recorded. A 2011 study identified coastal erosion, flooding and water availability and supply as the most significant impacts of climate change on some of the villages on Taveuni.

Climate data for Taveuni (Matei Airport, 1991–2020 normals)
Month	Jan	Feb	Mar	Apr	May	Jun	Jul	Aug	Sep	Oct	Nov	Dec	Year
Mean daily maximum °C (°F)	30.3 (86.5)	30.5 (86.9)	30.7 (87.3)	29.9 (85.8)	29.0 (84.2)	28.1 (82.6)	27.5 (81.5)	27.5 (81.5)	27.9 (82.2)	28.4 (83.1)	29.2 (84.6)	29.9 (85.8)	29.1 (84.4)
Daily mean °C (°F)	27.3 (81.1)	27.5 (81.5)	27.6 (81.7)	27.0 (80.6)	26.2 (79.2)	25.5 (77.9)	24.8 (76.6)	24.8 (76.6)	25.2 (77.4)	25.7 (78.3)	26.3 (79.3)	27.0 (80.6)	26.2 (79.2)
Mean daily minimum °C (°F)	24.2 (75.6)	24.5 (76.1)	24.5 (76.1)	24.1 (75.4)	23.3 (73.9)	22.8 (73.0)	22.0 (71.6)	22.0 (71.6)	22.3 (72.1)	22.8 (73.0)	23.4 (74.1)	24.1 (75.4)	23.3 (73.9)
Average precipitation mm (inches)	337.8 (13.30)	257.2 (10.13)	257.7 (10.15)	266.2 (10.48)	173.7 (6.84)	139.7 (5.50)	91.5 (3.60)	105.1 (4.14)	143.9 (5.67)	202.3 (7.96)	196.5 (7.74)	328.6 (12.94)	2,500.2 (98.43)
Average precipitation days (≥ 1.0 mm)	17.9	17.0	17.3	16.8	12.9	11.2	10.4	10.3	11.1	13.8	14.3	18.4	171.4
Source: World Meteorological Organization

== History ==
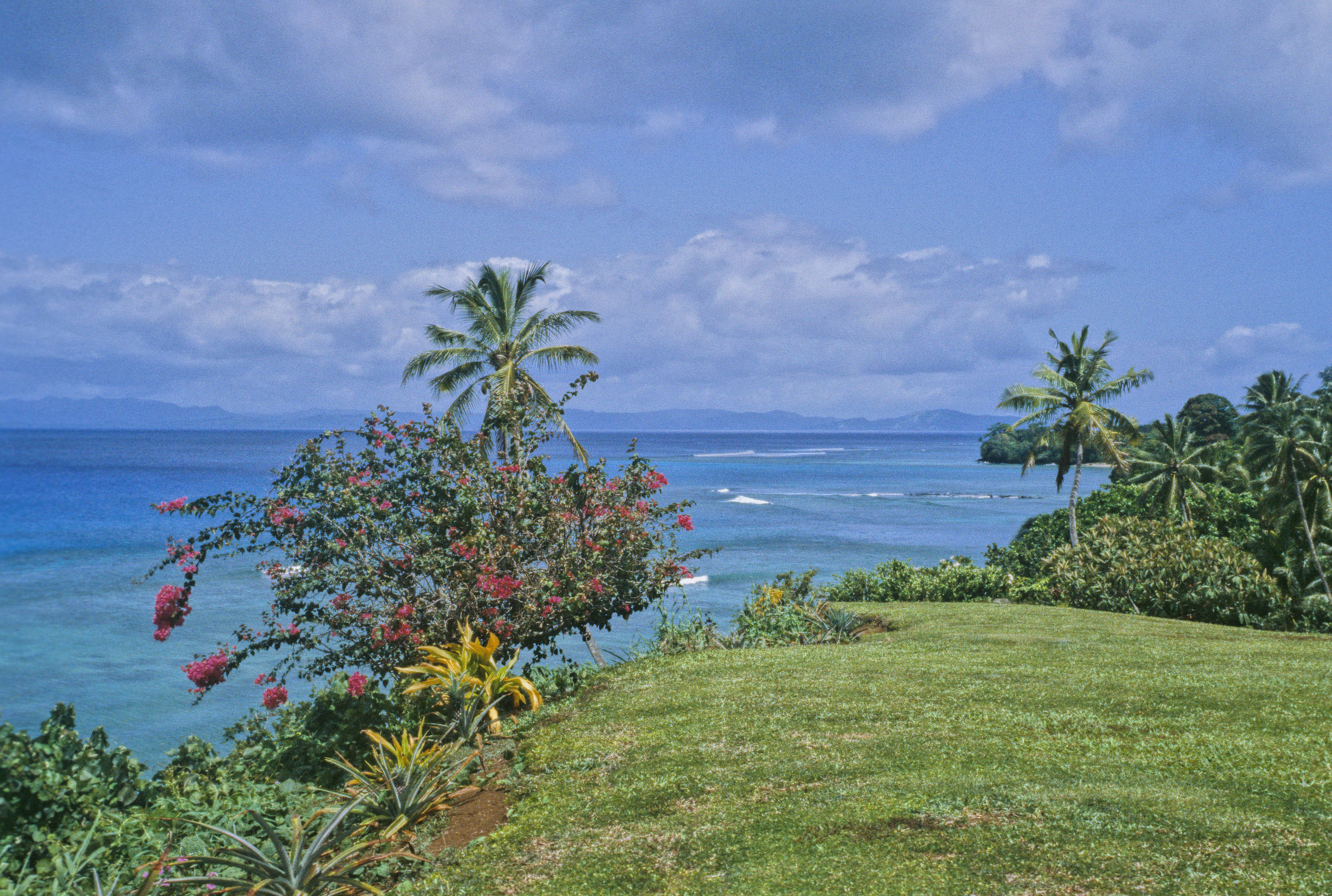
Coastal view towards Matagi Island, 2010

In 1643, Abel Tasman became the first European to sight Taveuni. Visibility was poor, and he mistook the peaks of Taveuni for separate islands. Historically, Vuna was considered the paramount village on Taveuni when the Tui Cakau (Ratu Yavala) resided there, but tribal warfare eventually established the supremacy of Somosomo. In the late 1860s, the Tongan warlord Enele Ma'afu, who had conquered the Lau Islands, was defeated by the Tui Cakau's army in a skirmish at Somosomo. Several islands that sided with Ma'afu were sold by the Tui Cakau at that time to European settlers as punishment, and their inhabitants were moved to Taveuni. The villages of Lovonivonu and Kanacea are populated with their descendants.

In fact, Enele Ma'afu was not defeated by the Tui Cakau's army as stated above. He was in Tonga at that time. In July 1862, Ma’afu went for a visit to Tonga with Tui Bua to seek resolution about his campaign in Fiji with the Tongan Parliament. During his absence, Wainiqolo, one of his lieutenants, waged war on Golea. Wainiqolo was shot dead on the beach at Wairiki and the Tongans were slaughtered.

Wainiqolo had taken Tui Cakau prisoner when Golea was involved in an internal Cakaudrove campaign. It was an opportune time for Wainiqolo to initiate his campaign whilst Golea was involved in an internal struggle on Vanualevu. Ma’afu never forgave Wainiqolo for the act that he did and removed all land allocated to him. Historians saw this anger as confirmation that Ma’afu was not part of the Wainiqolo plot to conquer Tui Cakau while he was away in Tonga. The unprovoked attack by Wainiqolo was regarded by the Tui Cakau as cancelling his obligation to respect the right of Ma’afu to islands which had been formerly part of Cakaudrove chiefdom. Golea proceeded to resell the whole of Vanuabalavu to Europeans.

On 3 February 1865, a Court of Arbitration was convened by British Consul Jones who handed down the Court's decision that Ma’afu was the lawful owner of Vanuabalavu and associated islands. Ma’afu immediately executed an affidavit the following day stating that Vanuabalavu and all the other lands given to him. The life of Enele Ma'afu the Tui Lau has been documented in the "Summary of Key Historical Events". Na Tikina Makawa o Vuna was not defeated by Somosomo as the above statement reads. In fact, historically, Taveuni was owned and controlled by two distinct Chieftainship, Tikina o Vuna from the south, and one in the north of Taveuni. The Tui Cakau has his land across water from Taveuni island and the central part of Taveuni.

In 1876, a 2.4 metres (7.9 feet) horse tramway was constructed on the Selia Levu estate to transport sugar cane to a mill.

=== Recent ===
The Taveuni F.C. was founded in 1947. Bouma Forest Park, later renamed Bouma National Heritage Park was established in 1990 after landowning clans became concerned by the threat of logging. The reserve has expanded to cover roughly one third of the island. In January 2003, Severe Tropical Cyclone Ami crossed the island. In January 2008, Cyclone Gene caused widespread damage on the island. In March 2010, the island was hit by Severe Tropical Cyclone Tomas. The eye of the storm passed within 30 km of the island and produced a significant tidal surge and high waves.

== Flora and fauna ==
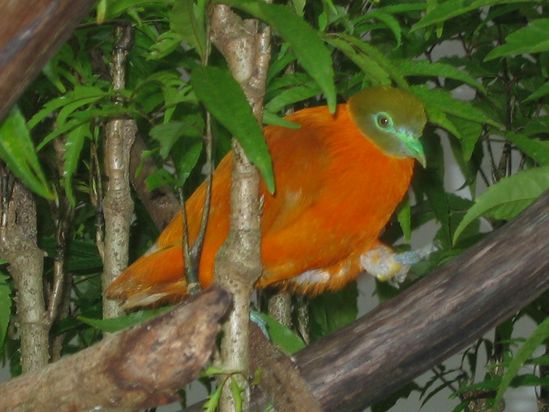
A male orange dove

Nearly all plants and animals indigenous to Fiji are found on Taveuni, which has suffered less devastation from land clearance than other areas of Fiji. The absence of the mongoose, a major predator, has also played a part in the survival on Taveuni of land crabs, the unique Fiji fruit bat, the Taveuni silk bat, and some unique species of palm. The island is the second largest in the Pacific Ocean to be free from the mongoose. Other species found on the island include the Fiji banded iguana and both Platymantis vitiensis and P. vitianus frog species. The critically endangered Fijian monkey-faced bat is found only on Taveuni. It was discovered by scientists in 1977. The flowering plant Balaka seemannii, which is endemic to Fiji, is found on the island.

The green iguana or American iguana has been introduced to the Fijian islands. The lizard poses a threat because it has no natural enemies, can reach a high population density, eats the taro plant and because it carries Salmonella bacteria which can be transferred to humans if bitten. In 2013, an eradication program coordinated by the Biosecurity Authority of Fiji saw a bounty placed on both adult and juvenile American iguanas as well as their eggs.

Taveuni is also home to the Taveuni beetle, maroon shining parrot, Fiji goshawk, azure-crested flycatcher, Fiji white-eye, Fiji parrot finch, orange dove, and the kula parrot, and the Australian magpie, introduced to control coconut pests, has proliferated on the island. The critically endangered red-throated lorikeet has been found here. In total, 22 regional endemic bird species have been recorded on Taveuni. The total number of bird species found on the island is closer to 100.

== Economy ==
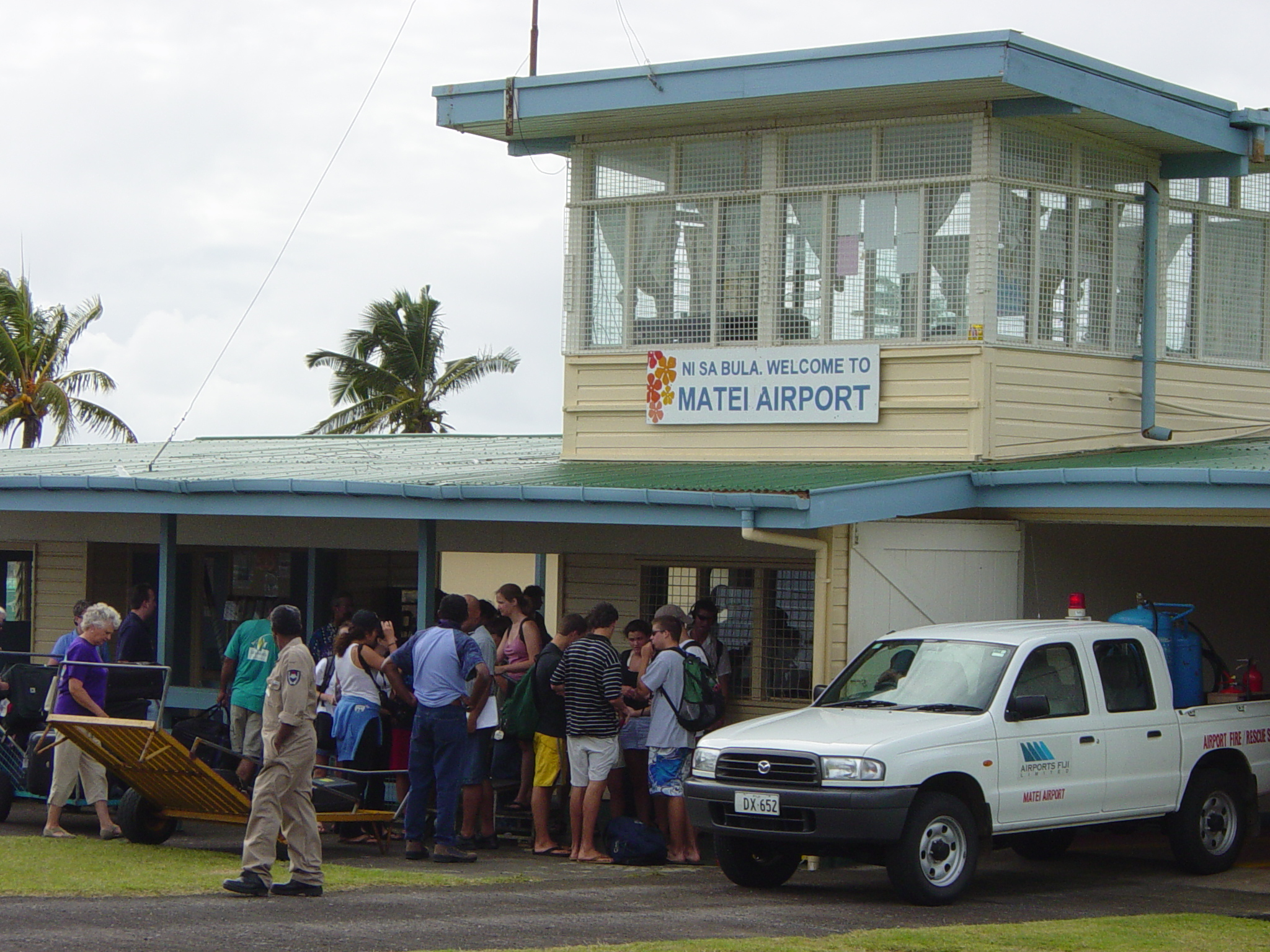
Matei Airport, 2003

The island's agricultural output is a significant contributor to the Fijian economy.

Copra has been traditionally the most important crop produced on Taveuni, and has always been the staple of the local economy. In recent times farmers have mainly shifted to growing taro, kava and other speciality crops like vanilla, along with tropical fruit and coffee. During the American Civil War (1861–1865), cotton was raised on Taveuni and exported to Europe. Sugarcane was also grown for a brief period. Livestock such as sheep, cattle and poultry are also raised, but animal husbandry lags behind crop production in terms of economic importance. In recent times, tourism has become a contributor to the local economy, with about a dozen small resorts providing accommodation options for visitors and employment and business opportunities to the local population.

Taveuni is also on track of becoming 100% renewable with the recent commissioning of a solar power station funded mainly by Korea and Japan.

=== Transportation ===
The island is served by Matei Airport.

== Language ==
The Taveuni dialect of Fijian reflects Tongan influence. One of its most distinctive features is the replacement of the consonant 'k' by a glottal stop. The Tui Cakau is therefore known locally as the Tui Ca'au.

== Notable Taveunians ==
Taveuni notable peoples of high birth, other settler societies or ordinary Fijian (Indigenous) residents can be traced back to the era before European contact through to Deed of Cession of Fiji with Great Britain to Fiji Independence and today. Taveuni has five main key main villages which has their own Paramount Chiefs. These Chiefs are crucial in keeping their people informed of changes and updates on developments in Fiji. These are those that have helped shaped Taveuni and holding together its people. Perhaps the best-known Taveuni resident internationally was Ratu Sir Penaia Ganilau (1918–1993), Fiji's last Governor-General and first President, who was also Tui Cakau. The Ganilau family is a branch of the Ai Sokula clan, to which the present Tui Cakau and former Cabinet Minister Ratu Naiqama Lalabalavu also belongs. He died in 1993, and was buried there. Another notable Taveunian is Fiji's former First Lady, Adi Salaseini Kavunono, wife of President Ratu Josefa Iloilo (2000–2009). Ratu Jone Yavala Kubuabola served as Fiji's Minister for Finance from 2000 to 2006. He was also a former Governor of the Reserve Bank of Fiji.

Ratu Inoke Kubuabola (younger brother of Ratu Jone Yavala Kubuabola) is a Fijian politician who served as Leader of the Opposition in 1999 and 2000. He became leader of the Soqosoqo ni Vakavulewa ni Taukei, or SVT, following its defeat in the 1999 election and the subsequent resignation of its leader, the defeated Prime Minister Sitiveni Rabuka, from Parliament. Kubuabola served as Fiji's High Commissioner to Papua New Guinea from 2002 to 2005. In late 2005, he attempted to handle the problem of Fijian security guards, whom some accused of being mercenaries, operating illegally on the island of Bougainville. The incident embarrassed the Fijian government and threatened to strain relations between the two countries. On 4 May 2006 Kubuabola was posted to Tokyo as Fiji's Ambassador to Japan and Korea, replacing Ratu Tevita Momoedonu. He remained in this position until July 2009; on 24 July, he was named Minister for Foreign Affairs by the Interim Government, a position he still holds as of 2015. The Kubuabola family is a branch of the Ai Sokula clan.

Isikeli Vuruna, a rugby union footballer, was born on Taveuni.

== Cultural references ==
- Both Avengers of the Reef (1973) and Return to the Blue Lagoon (1991) were partially filmed on the island.
- Jostein Gaarder's novel Maya (1999) is largely set on Taveuni.
- Fantasy Island (2020) was also filmed on the island.

== See also ==
- List of volcanoes in Fiji
- List of islands
