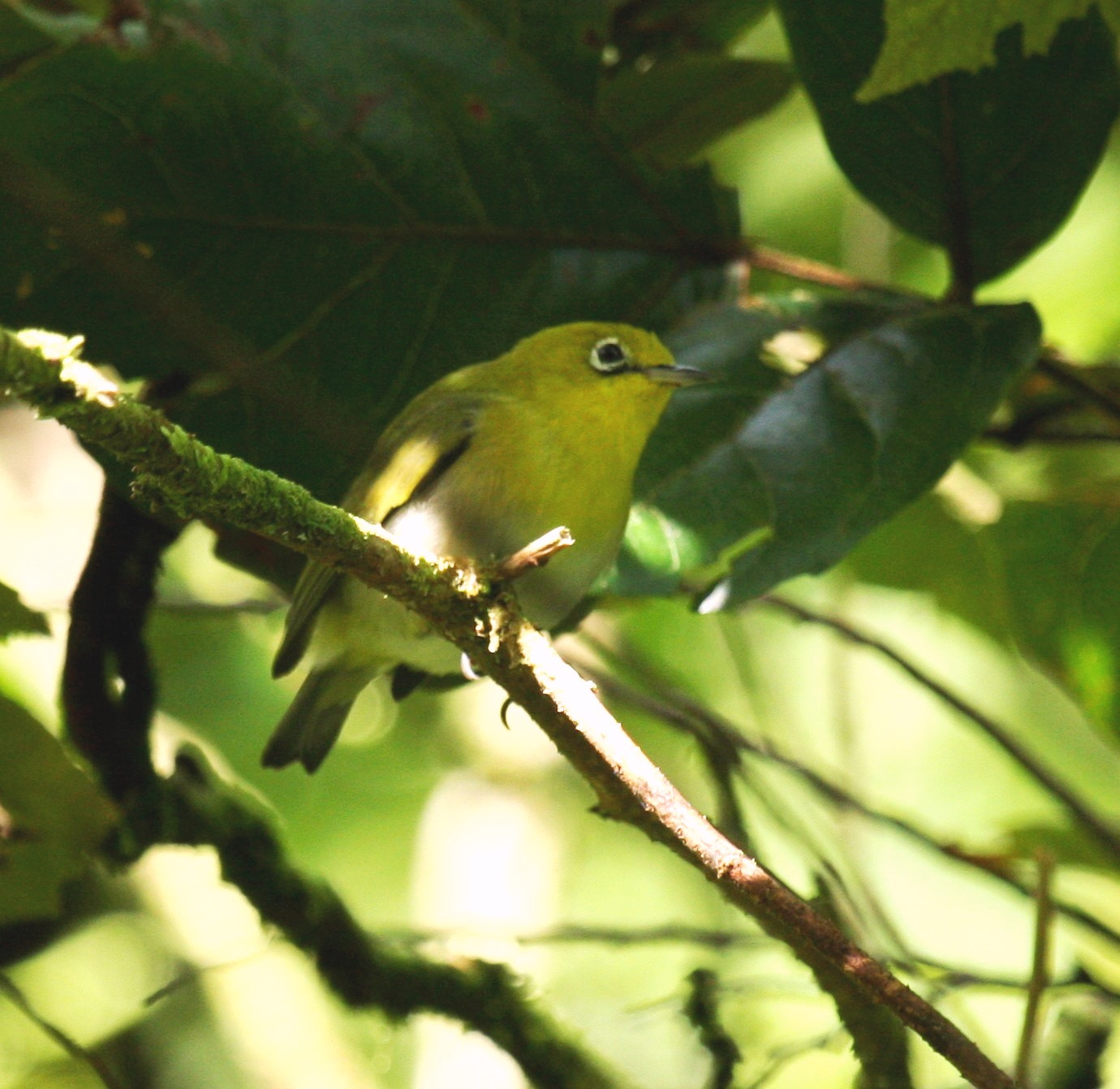
- In forest at De Voeux Peak on Taveuni

Conservation status
- Least Concern (IUCN 3.1)

Scientific classification
- Kingdom: Animalia
- Phylum: Chordata
- Class: Aves
- Order: Passeriformes
- Family: Zosteropidae
- Genus: Zosterops
- Species: Z. explorator

Binomial name
- Zosterops explorator Layard, 1875
- Range highlighted in red

= Fiji white-eye =

Species of bird

The Fiji white-eye (Zosterops explorator) is a species of passerine bird in the white-eye family Zosteropidae. The species is also known as Layard's white-eye.

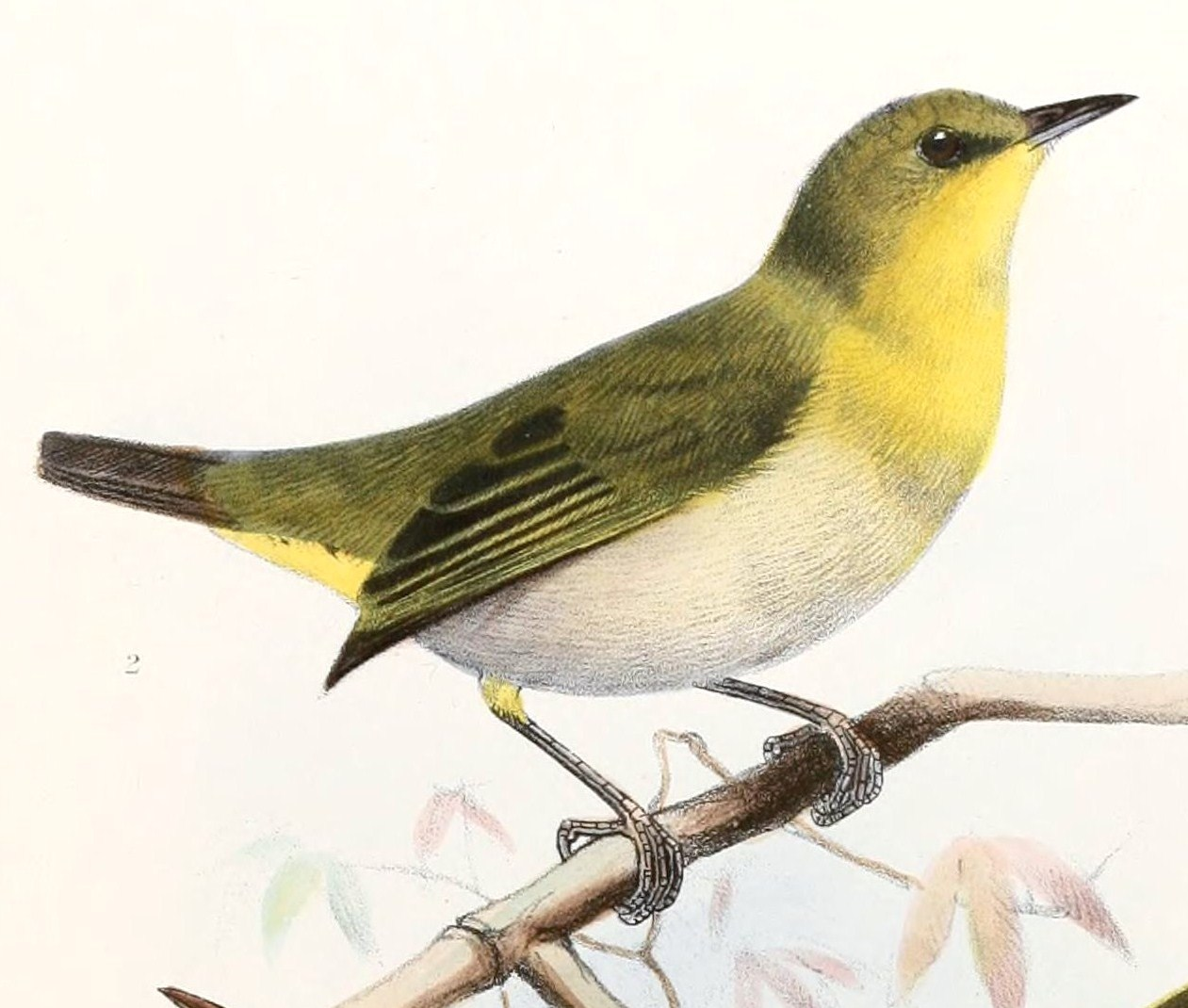
Illustrated by Joseph Smit (1881)

It is endemic to the islands of Viti Levu, Vanua Levu, Taveuni, Kadavu, and Ovalau in Fiji, where it is a common bird of forests. Where it co-occurs with the closely related silvereye it is more common in denser forest.

It is a typical small white-eye of the genus Zosterops, similar in appearance to the silvereye, although the plumage is much yellower, it is chunkier and has a complete eye-ring. The back is olive green and the throat and belly yellow. The call is described as "a high pitched seeu-seeu".

The Fiji white-eye feeds by gleaning insects from shrubs and trees. It will join mixed-species feeding flocks with other Fijian birds, including silvereyes. It also feeds lower down in the trees than silvereyes.
