= Qamea =

10 kilometre long Fijian island

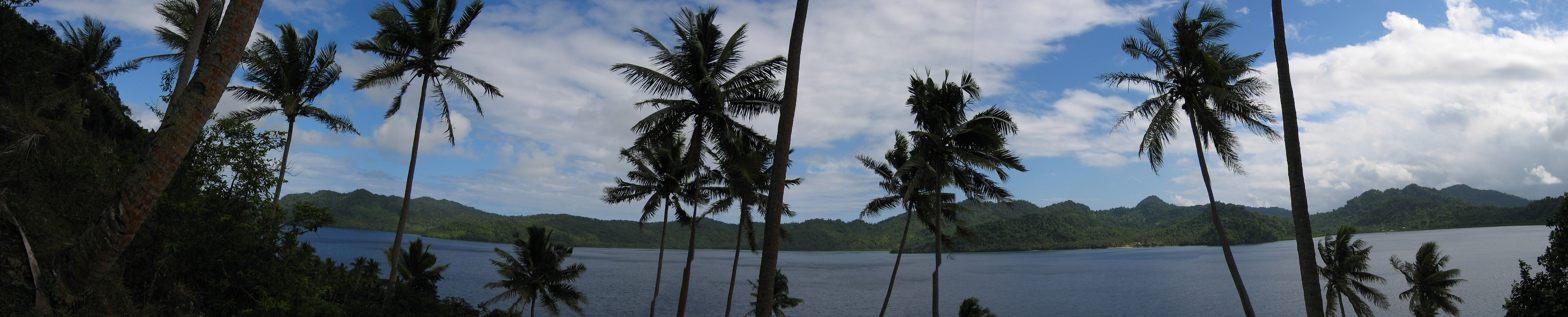
- A partial view of Qamea as seen from Matagi Island

- Location within Fiji

Geography
- Location: Koro Sea; South Pacific Ocean
- Coordinates: 16.7588721°S 179.7527003°W
- Archipelago: Vanua Levu Group
- Area: 34 km^{2} (13 sq mi)
- Highest elevation: 300 m (1000 ft)

Administration
- Fiji
- Division: Northern Division
- Province: Cakaudrove
- District: Wainikeli
- Largest settlement: Kocoma (pop. 550)

Qamea (pronounced [ŋɡaˈmea]) is one of three islets lying to the east of Thurston Point on the island of Taveuni, Fiji, the others being Matagi and Laucala.

== Geography ==
Qamea lies some 2.5 kilometers east of Thurston Point and covers an area of 34 square kilometers. Its length is 10 kilometers; its width varies from a few hundred meters to five kilometers. The island is characterized by high hills (some as much as 300 meters in height) and steep valleys. Indigenous fauna survived better in Qamea than in many other areas of Fiji, as the mongoose was never introduced. Qamea's Naivivi Bay is known geographically as a hurricane hole - a natural shelter from hurricanes.

== Demographic and economic factors ==
Kocoma, which has a population of about 550, is the largest of six villages on the island. The others are Dreketi, Togo, Naiviivi, Vatusogosogo, and Waibulu. The islanders are noted for a particular delicacy called paileve, which is fermented in a pit. Also famous is the migration of "lairo" or red land crabs, which occurs near the full moon in November. Activities include water-skiing, fishing, windsurfing, snorkelling, sailing, shelling, and canoeing.
