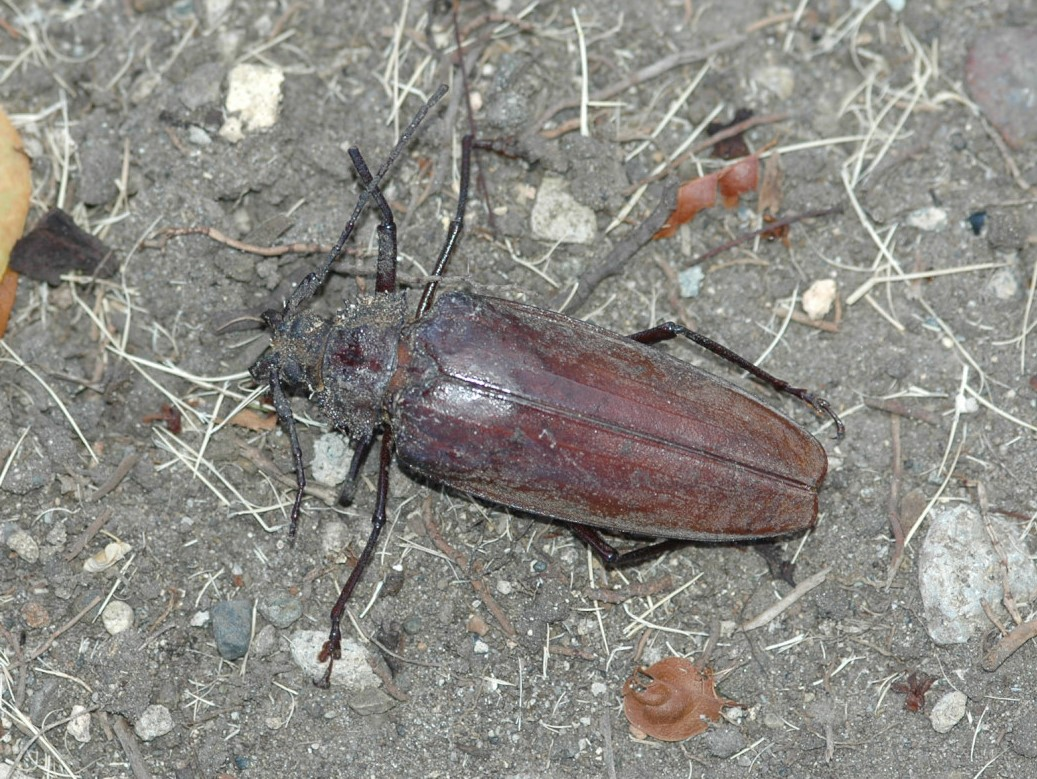

Scientific classification
- Kingdom: Animalia
- Phylum: Arthropoda
- Clade: Pancrustacea
- Class: Insecta
- Order: Coleoptera
- Suborder: Polyphaga
- Infraorder: Cucujiformia
- Family: Cerambycidae
- Genus: Xixuthrus
- Species: X. domingoensis

Binomial name
- Xixuthrus domingoensis Fisher, 1932

Synonyms
- Mecosarthron domingoensis (Fisher, 1932); Xixuthrus domingensis Auctt. [misspelling]

= Xixuthrus domingoensis =

Species of beetle

Xixuthrus domingoensis is a species of beetle in the family Cerambycidae. It is endemic to the Dominican Republic.

== Taxonomy ==
It has also been classified in the genus Mecosarthron, but this assignment has been challenged, with evidence both for and against the placement of this species in the genus Xixuthrus, which is otherwise restricted to the Old World.

== Description ==
Females measure 60–85 mm (2.4–3.3 in) in total length (including the mandibles).
