= Mount Taveuni =

Mountain in Fiji

Taveuni
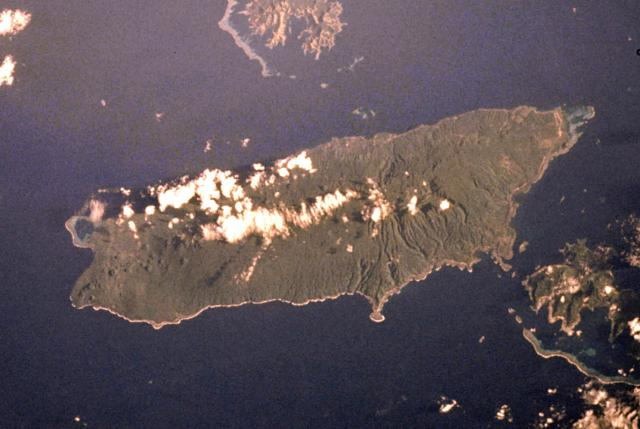
- NASA Space Shuttle image of Taveuni. Top of image is NW.

Highest point
- Elevation: 1,241 m (4,072 ft)
- Prominence: 1,241 m (4,072 ft)
- Coordinates: 16°49′S 179°58′W

Geography
- Location within Fiji
- Location: Fiji

Geology
- Mountain type: Elongated shield volcano
- Last eruption: 1550 ± 100 yrs

Taveuni is elongated shield volcano on Taveuni Island, Fiji, and its peak (Mount Uluigalau) reaches 1,241 m (4,072 ft) above sea level.

== History ==
Volcanism on Taveuni began circa 780,000 years ago, but most volcanic activity took place during the Holocene Epoch, which started about 11,000 years ago.

=== Holocene activity ===
Since 9500 B.C., 167 volcanic vents have formed, primarily along the southern inland tip. The youngest vent formed sometime between 4690 and 4900 B.C. Eruptions occurred at intervals of about 70 years. However, since 1200 B.C., there have been six periods of frequent eruptions, each lasting between 200 and 400 years.

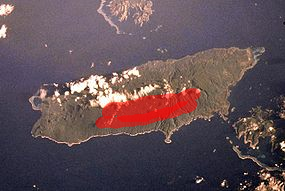

== Hazards ==
If an eruption does occur, Taveuni's economy could easily be destroyed. Nearly all farms would catch on fire and nearly every port in Taveuni is in a hydrovolcanic hazard zone or a lahar hazard zone. All imports and exports would be completely stopped until the ports are repaired.

=== Lava flows ===
Unlike many other volcanoes, the largest hazard from Taveuni is actually its lava flows, which are exceptionally hot (940–1125°C). Because Taveuni is heavily forested, fires can spread fast and easily, but mainly the southern flank of the island will be directly affected by the lava.

=== Ballistic ejection ===
Another major hazard of an eruption on Taveuni is the lava being shot into the air. In some cases lava has been ejected about 1.8 km (1.1 mi) into the air, and the sheer force of the lava falling can easily destroy any structure on the island that it hits.

=== Volcanic gases ===
Volcanic gases are another major hazard to Taveuni, as they can easily cause respiration problems, poison water, and corrode metal. Most of the gases include:

- H_{2}O
- CO_{2}
- SO_{2}
- HCl
- NH_{3}
- H_{2}S
- HF

=== Lahars ===
Lahars are a fast-moving mixture of volcanic debris and water that are fatal and have the potential to destroy many buildings. The path of lahars on Taveuni would be significantly affected by Taveuni's topography. It is likely that they would strike the southern flank of the island, as many of the vents formed are on a slope leading there.

=== Hydrovolcanic potential ===
A hydrovolcanic eruption occurs when lava comes into contact with water. Hydrovolcanic eruptions can cause violent explosions and large waves. Radiocarbon dating has shown that many hydrovolcanic eruptions occurred in the past. It is quite possible they will occur again during a future eruption.

== Economic effects of Taveuni ==
The volcano on Taveuni island has a generally good effect on its economy, as it leaves behind rich volcanic soils for farming, in fact, Taveuni island is sometimes referred to as the "Garden State" because of the soil. Since Taveuni's main income is from agriculture, copra, dalo, and kava crops (Taveuni's major crops) thrive in the rich soil.

=== Tourism in Taveuni ===
Taveuni has attracted many tourists, as there are a total of 13 resorts on the island. Most of these resorts have the same activities. Tourists came to Taveuni to see the World Heritage Park which is located in Bouma. Among these there are cascading waterfalls in Bouma and Lavena and a natural waterslide, blow holes, lagoons, the famous Rainbow Reef, the great white wall dive, the location of the second Blue Lagoon Movie, Somosomo Straits and scenic lookouts.
