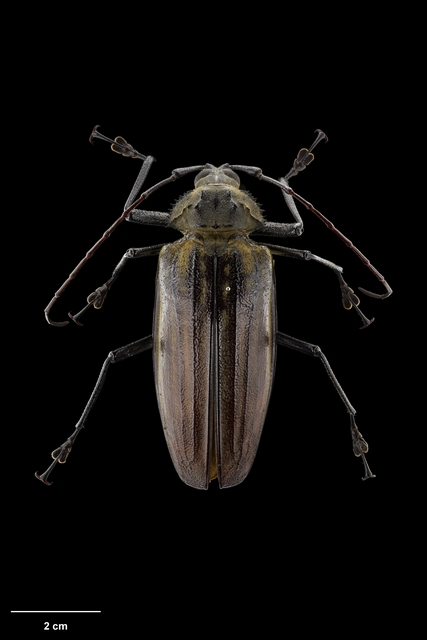
- Female

Conservation status
- Endangered (IUCN 3.1)

Scientific classification
- Kingdom: Animalia
- Phylum: Arthropoda
- Clade: Pancrustacea
- Class: Insecta
- Order: Coleoptera
- Suborder: Polyphaga
- Infraorder: Cucujiformia
- Family: Cerambycidae
- Genus: Xixuthrus
- Species: X. heros

Binomial name
- Xixuthrus heros (Gräffe, 1868)

Synonyms
- Macrotoma heros

= Giant Fijian long-horned beetle =

giant Fijian long-horned beetle

Species of beetle

The giant Fijian long-horned beetle (Xixuthrus heros) is native to the islands of Viti Levu in Fiji, and is one of the largest living insect species, with specimens around 15 cm long, excluding legs, antennae, or jaws. It is closely related to the Taveuni beetle, which is only marginally smaller. These beetles have powerful jaws, and should be handled with care when alive—when threatened, they produce a loud and fearsome hissing noise by squeezing air out from under their elytra. The rainforest habitat on its home island has suffered severe fragmentation by deforestation and habitat degradation by invasive species such as the small Indian mongoose, with other threats being cyclones that could devastate its remaining habitat, light pollution and human consumption of its larvae. Consequently, the beetle is regarded as rare and endangered.

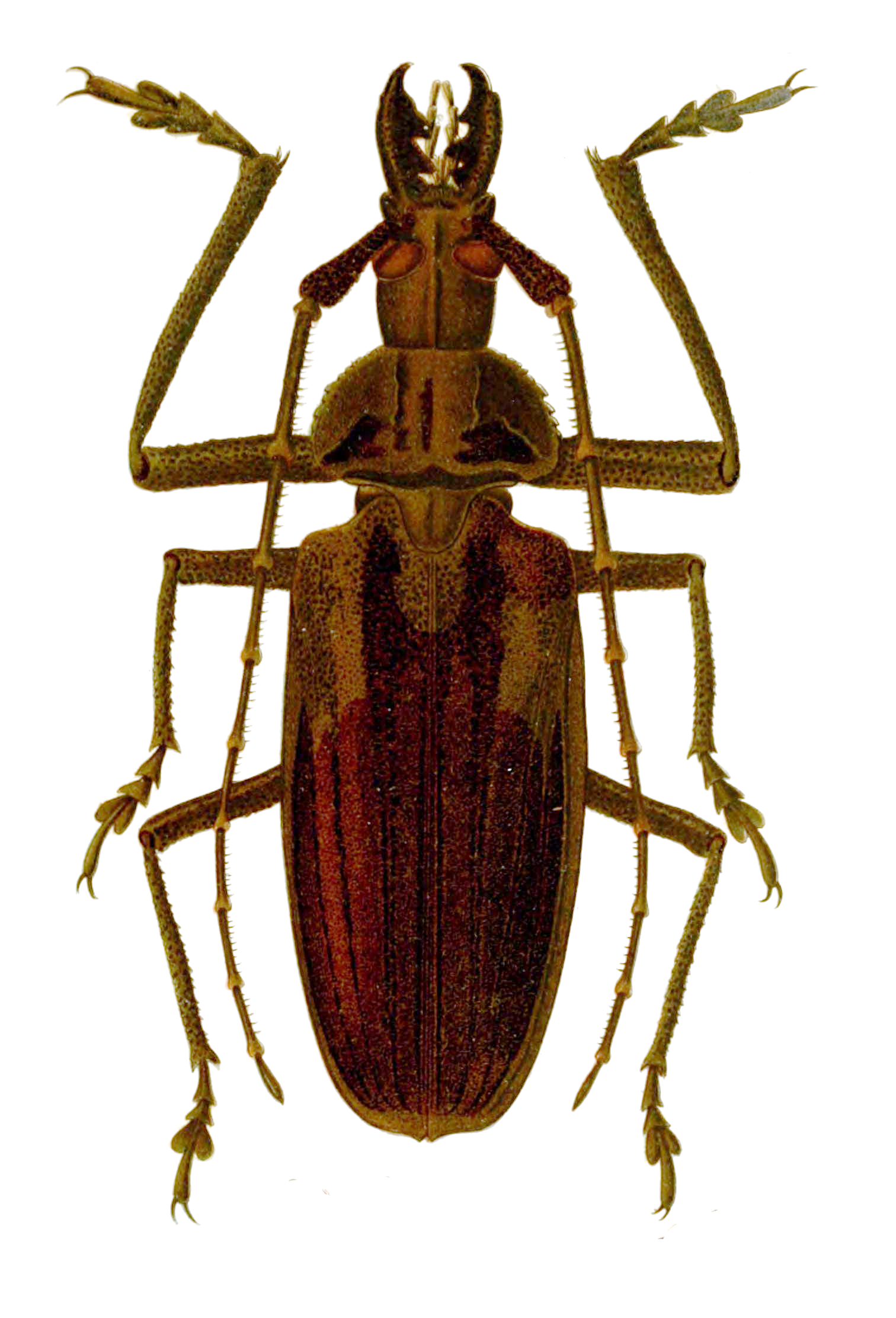
male

Xixuthrus heros is distributed in the lowland rainforests of south-east Viti Levu, with Colo-i-Suva Forest Reserve being the stronghold; natives in some nearby villages continue to consume the larvae when they split decaying wood, which is then burnt for fuel, placing additional pressures on the population. Adult beetles have been recorded in the past flying to lights in the nursing college near Suva. A scientific study in 2001/2002 determined that there are, in fact, two distinct species which had been identified as heros, one of them true heros, the other being X. ganglbaueri.

== Life cycle ==
The life cycle of X. heros is yet to be fully understood. Observations and historical collections suggest that these beetles are more prevalent during the months of May to September. Both male and female X. heros are primarily nocturnal and embark on long-distance flights in their quest for mates and suitable host trees. Additionally, there is evidence suggesting that certain cerambycid beetles, including X. heros, employ sex pheromones as attractants.

== Habitat and threats ==
The habitat of X. heros is the decaying wood of large trees, typically those with a minimum diameter of 80 cm. Such substantial trees are rare in the region, with estimates indicating their presence at less than four per square kilometer. This habitat is under threat from activities like logging, land clearance for agriculture, and vulnerability to cyclone damage. Notably, Xixuthrus larvae have been associated with the creation of intriguing galleries within the buabua tree (Fagraea gracilipes, Loganiaceae).

=== Logging ===
Xixuthrus heros faces imminent threats primarily linked to logging activities. Large trees, vital for the species' survival, are at risk due to extensive logging and the conversion of native forests into agricultural lands. Lowland forest habitats are swiftly vanishing, and these sizeable trees, essential for larval development, are incredibly scarce in Fijian forests.

=== Agricultural encroachment and cyclones ===
The relentless clearance of lowland forests for agriculture further intensifies the species' vulnerability. This agricultural expansion hastens the disappearance of suitable habitats. Furthermore, the growing frequency and strength of cyclones present a significant threat to the entire range of X. heros. These cyclones can cause extensive damage to the remaining habitat, potentially jeopardizing the survival of the species.

=== Human interactions and international trade ===
Fijians sometimes kill adult beetles due to their imposing size and loud hissing, particularly when attracted to electric lights. Additionally, the species has been collected for international trade, a practice that further exacerbates their scarcity. Any loss of larval or adult individuals before reproduction poses a substantial risk to the already vulnerable population.
