= Taveuni beetle =

Conservation status
- Endangered (IUCN 3.1)

Scientific classification
- Kingdom: Animalia
- Phylum: Arthropoda
- Class: Insecta
- Order: Coleoptera
- Suborder: Polyphaga
- Infraorder: Cucujiformia
- Family: Cerambycidae
- Genus: Xixuthrus
- Species: X. terribilis

Binomial name
- Xixuthrus terribilis Thomson, 1877

Synonyms
- Xixuthrus heyrovskyi Tippmann, 1945

Species of beetle

The Taveuni beetle (Xixuthrus terribilis) is known from the island of Taveuni in the Fiji, and is one of the largest living insect species, with specimens around 14 cm long, excluding legs, antennae, or mandibles.

It is closely related to the giant Fijian long-horned beetle. These beetles have powerful jaws, and should be handled with care when alive.

This species has been mistakenly classified under the name Xixuthrus heyrovskyi since 1945, when it was unwittingly redescribed, and this name still appears in much of the scientific literature.
