= Mount Nasorolevu =

Mountain in Fiji

Coordinates: 16°37′S 179°24′E

Mount Nasorolevu Ulunivanua o Nasorolevu पहाड़ नासोरोलेवु
- Location within Fiji

Highest point
- Elevation: 1,032 m (3,386 ft)
- Prominence: 1,032 m (3,386 ft)
- Listing: Ribu

Geography
- Location: Fiji

Mount Nasorolevu is the highest mountain on the island of Vanua Levu in Fiji. At 3,385 feet or 1,032 meters, it is the fourth highest peak of Fiji. It is located at Latitude: -16.6167 and Longitude: 179.4. Sharon Wild is the first woman to reach the peak.
