= Wainikoroiluva River =

River in Fiji

Coordinates: 18°05′S 178°04′E

Location
- Country: Fiji

Physical characteristics
- Source
  - location: Viti Levu

Wainikoroiluva River is a river of Viti Levu, Fiji.

== See also ==
- List of rivers of Fiji
