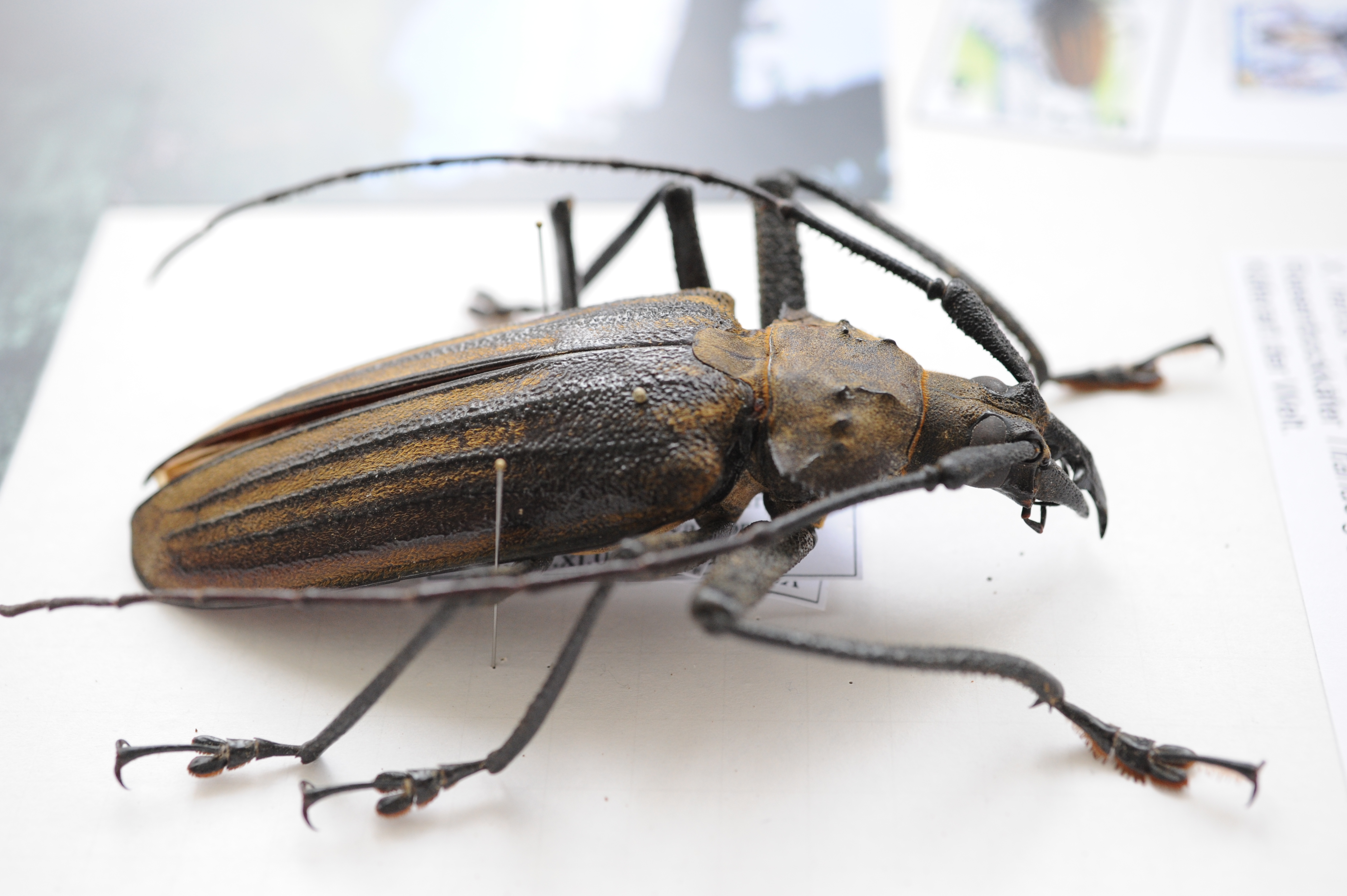
- Xixuthrus heros

Scientific classification
- Domain: Eukaryota
- Kingdom: Animalia
- Phylum: Arthropoda
- Class: Insecta
- Order: Coleoptera
- Suborder: Polyphaga
- Infraorder: Cucujiformia
- Family: Cerambycidae
- Subfamily: Prioninae
- Tribe: Macrotomini
- Genus: Xixuthrus; Thomson, 1877

Species
- see text

Synonyms
- Clinopleurus Lansberge, 1884; Chondrothrus Gressitt, 1959

= Xixuthrus =

Genus of beetles

Xixuthrus is a small genus of long-horned beetles, found primarily on Pacific islands, including Indonesia, New Guinea, the Solomon Islands, and Fiji, and contains some of the largest living insect species, the giant Fijian long-horned beetle and the Taveuni beetle. These beetles have powerful jaws, and should be handled with care when alive. No scientists have yet seen a larva of this genus, although in Fiji, where three different species occur, the natives consider them to be a rare and special delicacy.

== Systematics ==
The genus Xixuthrus is currently dividend in two subgenera: Xixuthrus s. str. and Daemonarthra Lameere, 1903.
The latter differs from the former in the apically acute (rather than rounded) lobes of the third tarsal segment.

Subgenus Xixuthrus Thomson, 1864

- Xixuthrus arfakianus (Lansberge, 1884)
- Xixuthrus axis Thomson, 1877
- Xixuthrus bufo Thomson, 1878
- Xixuthrus costatus (Montrouzier, 1855)
- Xixuthrus domingoensis Fisher 1932
- Xixuthrus fominykhi Titarenko & Zubov 2018
- Xixuthrus ganglbaueri Lameere, 1912
- Xixuthrus granulipennis Komiya, 2000
- Xixuthrus gressitti Marazzi, Marazzi & Komiya, 2006
- Xixuthrus heros (Gräffe, 1868)
- Xixuthrus jakli Titarenko & Zubov 2018
- Xixuthrus lameerei Marazzi, Marazzi & Komiya, 2006
- Xixuthrus lansbergei (Lameere, 1912)
- Xixuthrus lunicollis Lansberge 1884
- Xixuthrus microcerus (White, 1853)
- Xixuthrus nycticorax Thomson, 1878
- Xixuthrus penrousi Titarenko & Zubov, 2018
- Xixuthrus pinkeri Titarenko & Zubov, 2018
- Xixuthrus sapolsky Titarenko & Zubov, 2018
- Xixuthrus solomonensis Marazzi & Marazzi, 2006
- Xixuthrus stumpei Titarenko & Zubov, 2018
- Xixuthrus terribilis Thomson, 1877
- Xixuthrus thomsoni Marazzi, Marazzi & Komiya, 2006

Subgenus Daemonarthra Lameere, 1903

- Xixuthrus helleri (Lameere, 1903)
