= List of volcanoes in Fiji =

This is a list of active and extinct volcanoes in Fiji.

Name	Elevation		Location	Last eruption
Name	meters	feet	Coordinates	Last eruption
Koro	522	1713	17.32°S 179.40°E	Holocene
Nabukelevu	805	2641	19.12°S 177.98°E	1660 ± 30 years
Rotuma	256	840	12.50°S 177.08°E	Holocene
Taveuni	1241	4071	16.82°S 179.97°W	1550 ± 100 years
