= Laucala =

- Island
- Location in Fiji
- Coordinates: 16°45′00″S 179°41′00″W
- Country: Fiji
- Archipelago: Northern Lau Islands
- Division: Northern Division
- Province: Cakaudrove
- Tikina: Wainikeli

Area
  - Total: 12 km^{2} (4.6 sq mi)

Laucala (pronounced [lauˈðala]) is one of a triplet of small islands that lie to the east of Thurston Point on the island of Taveuni in Fiji. The privately owned islands are the site of the Laucala Resort.

The total land area of the main island is 12 km^{2} (4.6 sq mi). It is 5 km (3.1 mi) long with a maximum width of 3 km (1.9 mi), narrowing to 1.5 km (0.93 mi) in some places. The other two islands in the group are Qamea several hundred metres to the west and Matagi.

The island is served by Laucala Airport.

== History ==
The island was first settled by the Qaraniyaku people, led by their founder Buatavatava Naulumatua. He established Nauluvatu village.

=== Sphere of influence ===
Many islands and villages in the northern Lau islands were under political control or influence by Laucala: the villages of Vutuna, Daliconi and Mavana on Vanua Balavu, and the islands of Naitauba, Namalata, Yacata, Qelelevu and Cikobia.

Later, the islanders of Vuna (village in Taveuni) took over in the Lau islands, replacing Laucala power in theses islands.

=== Migration ===
In 1865, the island of Naitauba was sold to Europeans by the Tui Cakau and its inhabitants moved to Laucala. Later, the people of Laucala were displaced to the neighbouring island of Qamea.

=== Sale to Dietrich Mateschitz ===
In 2003 the late Dietrich Mateschitz, head of the Red Bull energy drink company, bought the island from Forbes's heirs for £7 million.

The resort now includes 25 bures, each unique from one another with differing themes. The projected cost per night ranges from US$7,000 to $36,000.
