= Isikeli Vuruna =

Fijian rugby union footballer (born 1988)

- Born: January 27, 1988
- Height: 1.79 m (5 ft 10 1/2 in)
- Weight: 80 kg (180 lb; 12 st 8 lb)

Rugby union career
- Position: Wing
International career
Years	Team	Apps	(Points)
2006	Fiji Schoolboys		
2007	Fiji U-19		
2007	Fiji Warriors		
2008	Fiji U20		
National sevens team
Years	Team		Comps
2012	Fiji 7s		

Isikeli Vuruna (born 27 January 1988 at Taveuni, Fiji) is a Fijian rugby union footballer.

He has also played in the national age group teams for Fiji in the Fiji Secondary Schools team of 2006 that played against the Australian Schoolboys on 30 September 2006.

Vuruna was selected and played for the Fiji Under 19 Team in the 2007 Under 19 Rugby World Championship that was held in Ireland and the Fiji Under 20 Team in the 2008 IRB Junior World Championship, held in England.

He played at wing for the Fiji A Team against the Tonga A Team in 2007.

Vuruna was selected for national duties in the Fiji National Sevens Team in the IRB Sevens World Series in 2012 playing for the victorious Fiji Sevens Teams in the Hong Kong and London tournaments.

Vuruna is a naval officer in the Fiji Navy and plays for the Fiji Navy Club and for Suva in the Fiji Rugby Union's Provincial Competition.
