= Qurai =

God of Somosomo in Fijian mythology

In Fijian mythology, Qurai (Ngurai) is a god of Somosomo. He once changed himself into a rat so he could attend a meeting of the gods unseen.
