= Vatuwaqa River =

River in Fiji

Coordinates: 18°08′S 178°28′E

Location
- Country: Fiji

Physical characteristics
- Source
  - location: Viti Levu

Vatuwaqa River is a river in the capital, Suva, on the island of Viti Levu, Fiji. The industrial zone at the river mouth is an example of land reclamation.

== See also ==
- List of rivers of Fiji
