= Macuata Province =

Province of Fiji

Coordinates: 16°26′S 179°22′E

- Province
- Interactive map of Macuata Province
- Country: Fiji
- Division: Northern Division

Area
  - Total: 2,004 km^{2} (774 sq mi)

Population (2017)
  - Total: 65,978
  - Density: 32.92/km^{2} (85.27/sq mi)

Macuata (Fijian pronunciation: [maˈðuata]) is one of Fiji's fourteen Provinces, and one of three based principally on the northern island of Vanua Levu, occupying the north-eastern 40 percent of the island. It has a land area of 2004 square kilometers.

== Demographics ==
The province has 114 villages spread over five districts (tikinas): Cikobia, Dogotuki, Labasa, Macuata, and Sasa; the district boundaries haven't changed since 1956. Its population of 65,978 at the 2017 census was the fourth largest of any Fijian province. As of 2007, Indo-Fijians constituted most of the population at 34,218 people, while native Fijians numbered 30,759. This made Macuata one of two predominantly Indo-Fijian provinces, the other being Ba Province. The majority of the province's population (75%) lives in Labasa district, which contains the town of Labasa. There are two urban areas: Labasa and Seaqaqa. More than a quarter of Macuata's population (27,949 in 2007) lives in the town of Labasa.

=== 2017 Census ===
Tikina (District)	Ethnicity						Total
Tikina (District)	iTaukei	%	Indo-Fijian	%	Other	%	Total
Cikobia	100	100.0	0	0.0	0	0.0	100
Dogotuki	2,057	98.3	25	1.2	10	0.5	2,092
Labasa	19,328	39.2	29,261	59.3	780	1.6	49,369
Macuata	5,841	62.5	3,313	35.4	192	2.1	9,346
Sasa	3,433	67.7	1,619	31.9	19	0.4	5,071
Province	30,759	46.6	34,218	51.9	1,001	1.5	65,978

== Politics ==
Wiliame Katonivere has been the Chief of Macuata since 2013.

== See also ==
- Coqeloa, a village in the province
