= Mount Uluigalau =

Mountain on Taveuni, Fiji

Mount Uluiqalau
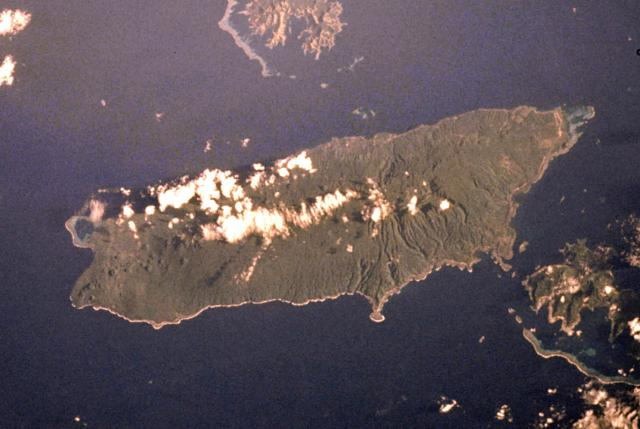
- NASA Space Shuttle image of Taveuni. Top of image is NW.

Highest point
- Elevation: 1,241 m (4,072 ft)
- Prominence: 1,241 m (4,072 ft)
- Listing: Ribu
- Coordinates: 16°49′00″S 179°58′00″E

Geography
- Location within Fiji
- Location: Fiji

Geology
- Mountain type: Elongated Shield volcano
- Last eruption: 1550 ± 100 yrs

Mount Uluiqalau is the highest mountain on the island of Taveuni in Fiji. It is 1,241 meters or 4,072 feet high and also the second highest mountain in the Fiji group.
