= Biosecurity Authority of Fiji =

Agency overview
- Formed: 17 December 2008
- Website: https://www.baf.com.fj

The Biosecurity Authority of Fiji (BAF) is the commercial statutory authority responsible for managing biosecurity risks in Fiji, predominantly at the border. It was established in 2008 under the Biosecurity Promulgation, following the reorganization of the Quarantine & Inspection Division, and in 2019 was reassigned to the Minister for Agriculture and Waterways.

It was formed with the intent to protect the island nation from foreign pests and diseases which threaten the island's agriculture and biodiversity. The authority funds its operations by levying fees on imports and exports.
