= Cakaulevu Reef =

Coral reef off the shore of Vanua Levu in Fiji

Coordinates: 16°14′40.91″S 179°22′49.78″E

Designations

Ramsar Wetland
- Official name: Qoliqoli Cokovata
- Designated: 16 January 2018
- Reference no.: 2331

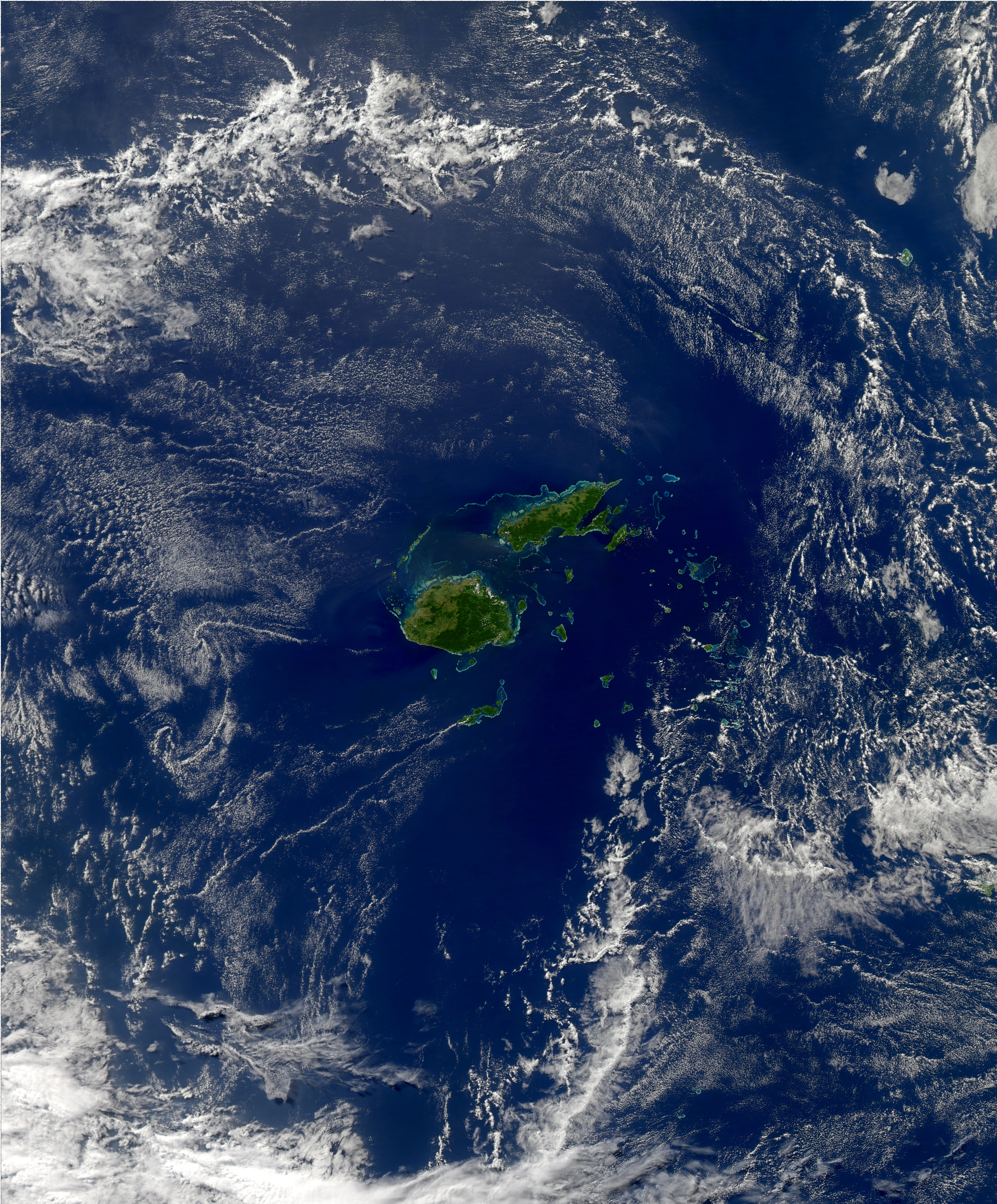
Image showing Fiji's second-largest island, Vanua Levu, and the Cakaulevu Reef that shelters the island's northern shore.

Cakaulevu Reef (also called the Great Sea Reef, or Rodriguez Reef) is a coral reef located off the northern shore of the island of Vanua Levu in Fiji. It is the third longest continuous barrier reef in the world after the Great Barrier Reef in Australia and the Mesoamerican Reef off Central America. When combined with the nearby Pascoe Reef, Cakaulevu Reef is about 200 kilometres (120 mi) long. On its own, the Cakaulevu Reef covers 202,700 square kilometres (78,300 sq mi).

The marine ecosystem of the reef contributes to its national significance as outlined in Fiji's Biodiversity Strategy and Action Plan.

== Marine life ==
The first systematic survey of the reef (in 2004) revealed a diverse marine population, including unique mangrove ecosystems and endemic fish. Twelve threatened species live within the reef: 10 fish species, the green turtle, and the spinner dolphin.

All of this marine life has traditionally supported the native population, and currently some 70,000 people depend on the reef. After seeing fish populations decline in recent decades, local leaders created a series of marine protected areas in 2005 where fishing is prohibited. Traditional customs used to manage the reef for hundreds of years permit leaders to set aside portions of the qoliqoli, or traditional fishing ground. Where the ban has been enforced, fish populations are rebounding and spilling over into areas where fishing is permitted.
