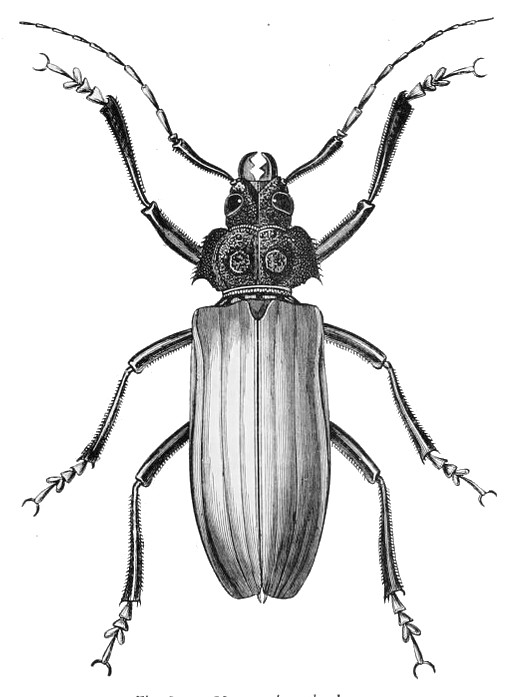
- Mecosarthron buphagus

Scientific classification
- Kingdom: Animalia
- Phylum: Arthropoda
- Clade: Pancrustacea
- Class: Insecta
- Order: Coleoptera
- Suborder: Polyphaga
- Infraorder: Cucujiformia
- Family: Cerambycidae
- Subfamily: Prioninae
- Tribe: Macrotomini
- Genus: Mecosarthron; Buquet, 1840

= Mecosarthron =

Genus of beetles

Mecosarthron is a genus of beetles in the family Cerambycidae, containing the following species:

- Mecosarthron buphagus Buquet, 1840
- Mecosarthron gounellei (Lameere, 1903)
- Mecosarthron tritomegas Lameere, 1920
