= Somosomo Strait =

Strait separating Taveuni and Vanua Levu, Fiji

The Somosomo Strait is the strait that separates Taveuni island and Vanua Levu in Fiji. It is known for its soft coral and is a popular diving location.
