= List of rivers of Fiji =

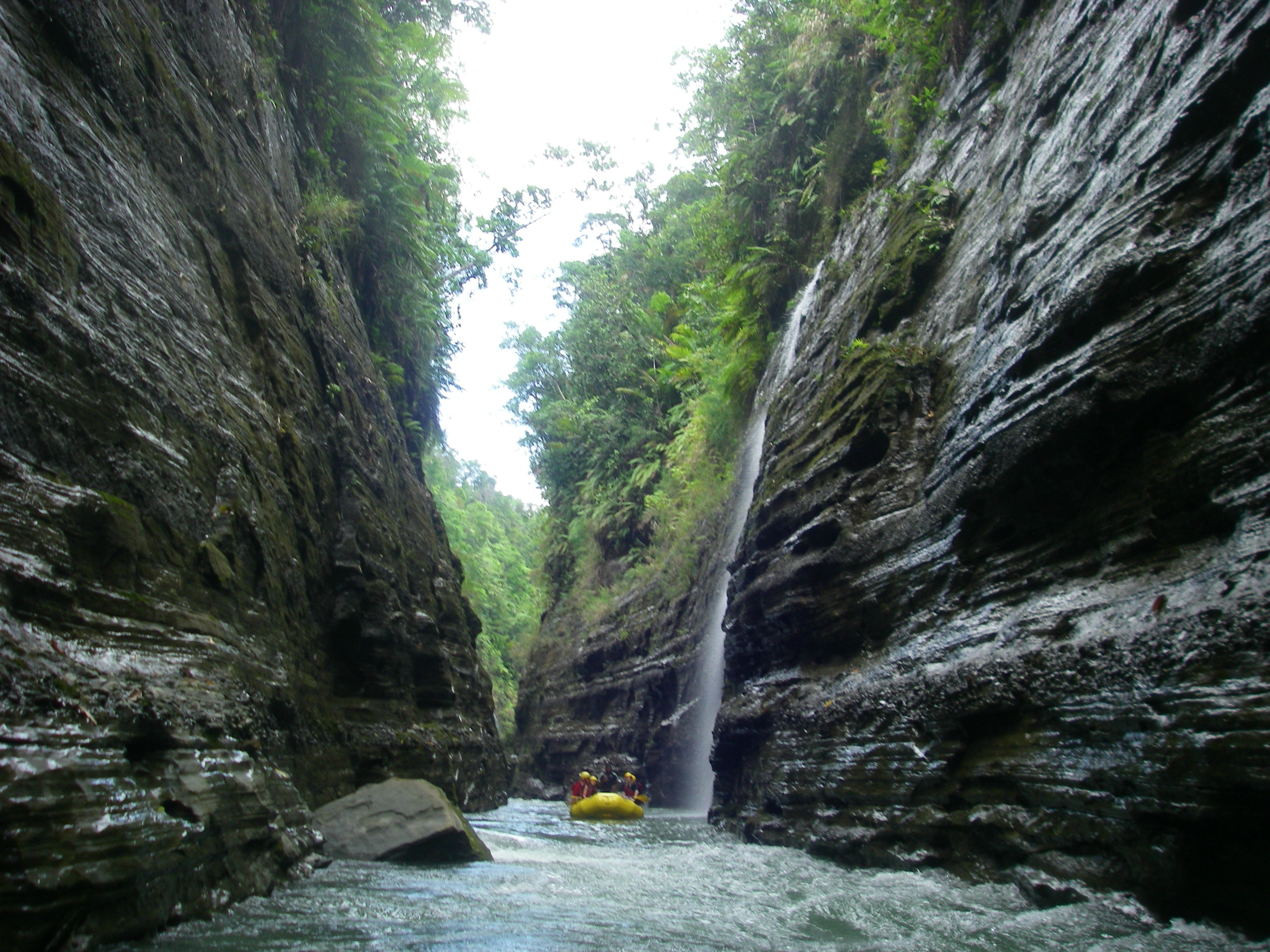
Navua River in Viti Levu

This is a list of the rivers of Fiji. They are listed by island in clockwise order, starting at the north end of each island. Tributaries are listed under the parent stream.

== Gau ==
- Wailevu River (Gau)

== Ovalau ==
- Lovoni River

== Taveuni ==
- Somosomo Creek
- Tavoro Creek
- Waibula River

== Vanua Levu ==
- Boda River
- Bua River
- Buca River
- Bucaisau River
- Dama River
- Dreketi River
  - Nabiti River
  - Naua River
    - Drawa River
    - Lutukina River
    - Navuturerega River
  - Korovuli River
  - Nakorotolutolu River
  - Nanenivuda River
  - Nasuva River
  - Seaqaqa River
  - Vunibelebele River
- Galogalo River
- Kasavu River
- Kilaka River
- Korolevu River
- Korotasere River
- Labasa River
  - Wairikicake River
  - Wairikiqisi River
- Lagalaga River
- Lakeba River
- Lekutu River
  - Kavula River
    - Nadamanu River
    - Nawailevu River
- Mataniwai River
- Naiselesele River
- Nakura River
- Nala River
  - Koroivonu River
- Nalomate River
- Naqereqere River
- Nasavu River
- Nasekawa River
  - Drakaniwai River
- Nasoni River
- Natoavou River
- Navilagolago River
- Nubu River
- Qaloyaqa River
- Qawa River
- Sarowaqa River
  - Tavua River
- Suetabu River
- Tabia River
- Tibitibi River
- Togolevu River
- Vaturova River
- Vunivia River
- Vuniyaro River
- Wailevu River (Vanua Levu)
- Wainikoro River
  - Nadogo River
  - Nalagi River
- Wainunu River
  - Dawacumu River
  - Nabuna River
  - Navilevu River
- Yanawai River

== Viti Levu ==
- Ba River
- Dawasamu River
- Deuba River
- Kubuna River
- Lami River
- Lobau River
- Nadi River
  - Malakua River
- Namata River
- Nasilai River
- Nasinu River
- Nasivi River
  - Saravi River
- Navua River
  - Wainikoroiluva River ('Luva River)
  - Veinuqa River
- Navuloa River
- Penang River
  - Nakauvadra River
- Qaraniqio River
- Rewa River
  - Nasoata River
  - Toga River
  - Vunidawa River
  - Waidina River
  - Waimanu River
  - Wainibuka River
    - Nasoqo River
    - Wailoa River
    - Waisomo River
  - Wainimala River
    - Lawaki River
- Rukuruku River
- Sabeto River
- Samabula River
- Savu River
- Sigatoka River
  - Namada River
- Sovi River
- Tamavua River
- Taunovo River
- Toguru River
- Tuva River
- Vatuwaqa River
- Veisari River
- Vitogo River
- Vuda River
- Waibula River (Viti Levu)
  - Waimaro River
  - Wainivesi River
- Waidalici River
- Waidamu River
- Wainadoi River
- Yaqara River
