= Vanua Levu =

Second largest island of Fiji

Vanua Levu वानुआ लेवु
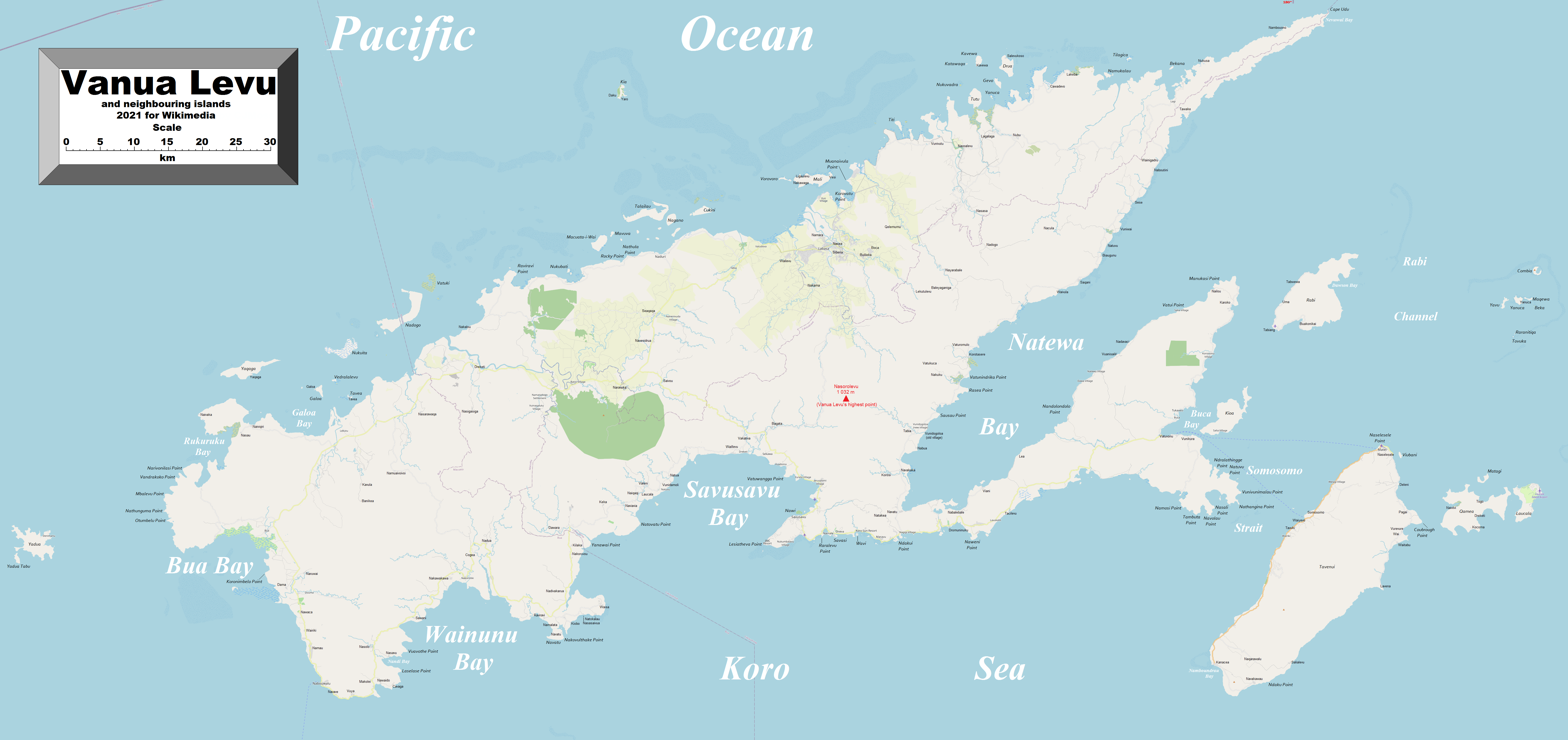
- Enlargeable, detailed map of Vanua Levu and outlying islands

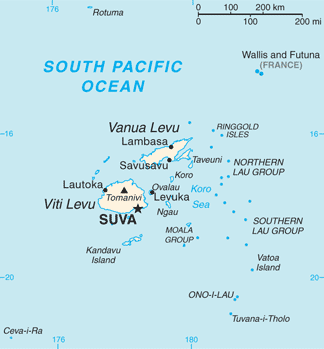

Geography
- Location: South Pacific Ocean
- Coordinates: 16°35′S 179°11′E
- Archipelago: Vanua Levu Group
- Area: 5,587.1 km^{2} (2,157.2 sq mi)
- Length: 180 km (112 mi)
- Width: 50 km (31 mi)
- Highest elevation: 1,032 m (3386 ft)
- Highest point: Mount Nasorolevu

Administration
- Fiji
- Division: Northern Division
- Province: Bua; Cakaudrove; Macuata
- Largest settlement: Labasa (pop. 22,204)

Demographics
- Population: 160,000 (2022)
- Pop. density: 23.27/km^{2} (60.27/sq mi)
- Ethnic groups: Mainly Native Fijians and Fiji Indians

Vanua Levu (pronounced [βaˈnua ˈleβu], lit. 'Big Land', Fiji Hindi: वानुआ लेवु), formerly known as Sandalwood Island, is the second largest island of Fiji. Located 64 kilometres (40 miles) to the north of the larger Viti Levu, the island has an area of 5,587.1 square kilometres (2,157.2 sq mi) and a population of approximately 160,000 as of 2022.

== Geology ==
Fiji lies in a tectonically complex area between the Australian plate and the Pacific plate. The Fiji Platform lies in a zone bordered with active extension fault lines around which most of the shallow earthquakes were centred. These fault lines are the Fiji Fracture Zone (FFZ) to the north, the 176° Extension Zone (176°E EZ) to the west, and the Hunter fracture zone (HFZ) and Lau Ridge to the east.

Mio-Pliocene sandstones and marl grade into epiclastics and andesitic volcanics of the Suva Group. The Group forms the Korotini Tableland in the middle of the island, it includes the peaks of Seseleka (1,380 feet or 420 meters), Ndelanathau (2,443 feet or 745 meters), Nararo (2,420 feet or 740 meters), Valili (2,965 feet or 904 meters), Mariko (2,890 feet or 880 meters), Mount Nasorolevu (3,386 feet or 1,032 meters), Ndikeva (3,139 feet or 957 meters), and Uluingala (2,730 feet or 830 meters). The Pliocene Undu Group in the northeastern portion of the island, consists of breccia, tuff, and flows of rhyolite and dacite overlain by pumiceous strata. The Plio-Pleistocene Mba Group is found on the southwestern portion of the island and consists of porphyritic basalt flows and volcanoclastics grading into greywacke. The Group includes the peak of Navotuvotu (2,763 feet or 842 meters) and the Mt. Kasi Mine.

== Geography ==
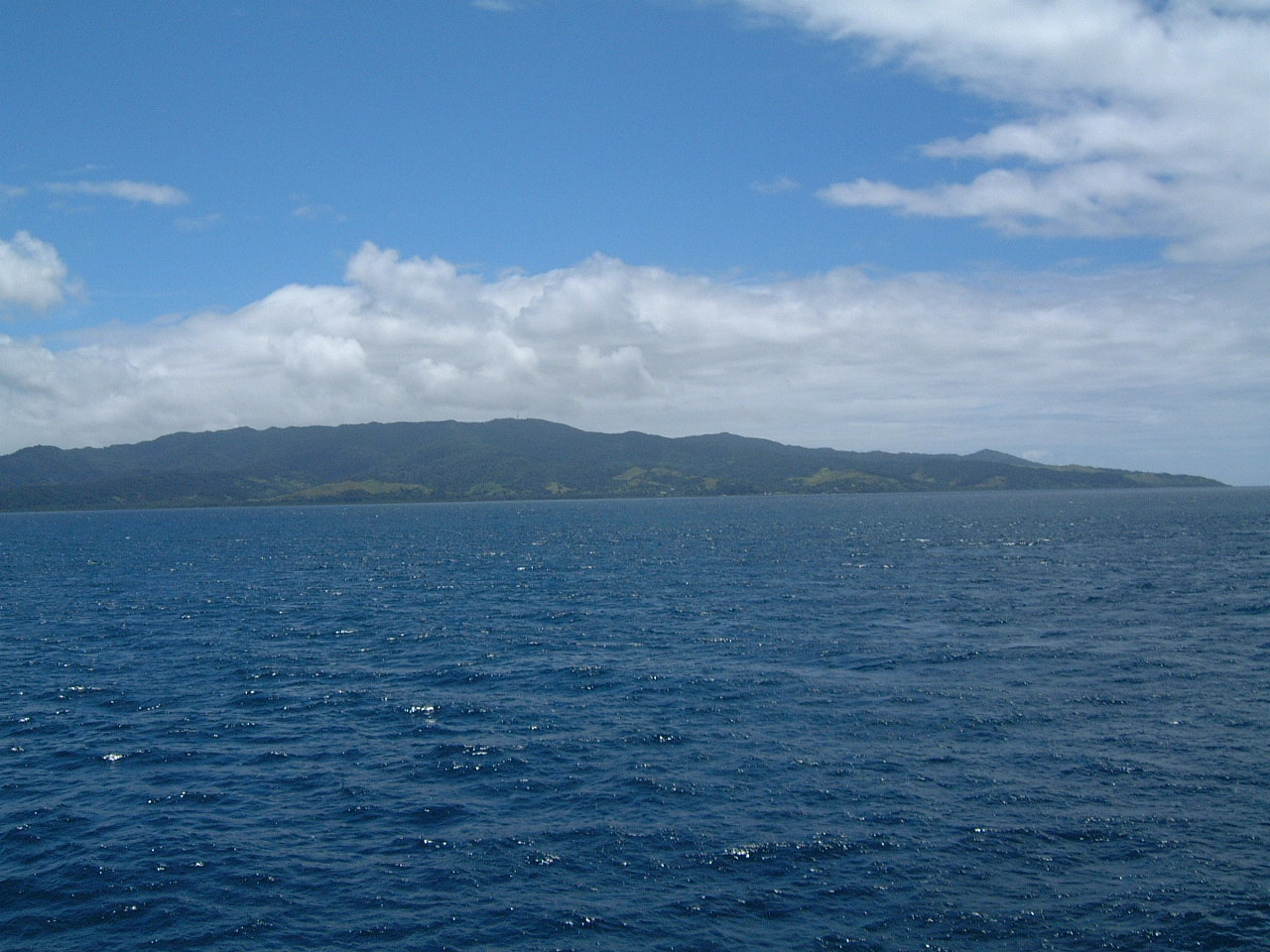
Island of Vanua Levu

The main part of the island is roughly shaped like a tall, thin triangle 30 to 50 kilometres (19–31 miles) in width and 180 kilometres (110 miles) in length, rotated so that the point is to the northeast. This point, the northernmost in the Fiji chain, is Udu Point. From the southeastern side of this triangle, a long peninsula stretches out into the Koro Sea. The island is rough and hilly, and is surrounded by coral reefs, including Cakaulevu Reef, a long barrier reef off the northern shore. The antimeridian passes through this island, just touching its northeastern tip.

A rugged mountain range divides the island horizontally, forming much of the boundary between the Provinces of Cakaudrove and Macuata. The highest peaks are Mount Batini, also known as Nasorolevu, with an elevation of 1,111 metres (3,645 feet), and, 16 kilometres (9.9 miles) further north-east, Dikeva, also known as Mount Thurston, with an elevation of 1,030 metres (3,380 feet). Vanua Levu's main mountain ranges lie near the windward, southern coasts, making them much wetter. Northern Vanua Levu, by contrast, has a dry climate eight months of the year, enabling sugar cane, the island's major crop, to thrive there. Vanua Levu has a number of rivers, including the Labasa, the Wailevu, and the Qawa. These three form a delta on which the town of Labasa stands. None of the island's rivers are navigable by large vessels. There are also many well known rivers on Vanua levu. The first is the most dangerous, the Wainikoro river, known for its shark attacks. The second is the Dreketi river, the deepest river in Fiji.

== Flora and fauna ==
A 17,600 hectares (43,000 acres) area covering much of the interior of the Natewa/Tunuloa peninsula is the Natewa/Tunuloa Peninsula Important Bird Area. The Important Bird Area covers the largest tracts of the remaining old-growth forest on the peninsula, which is on the south of Vanua Levu, and supports a population of the vulnerable shy ground doves.

== Demographics and economic activities ==
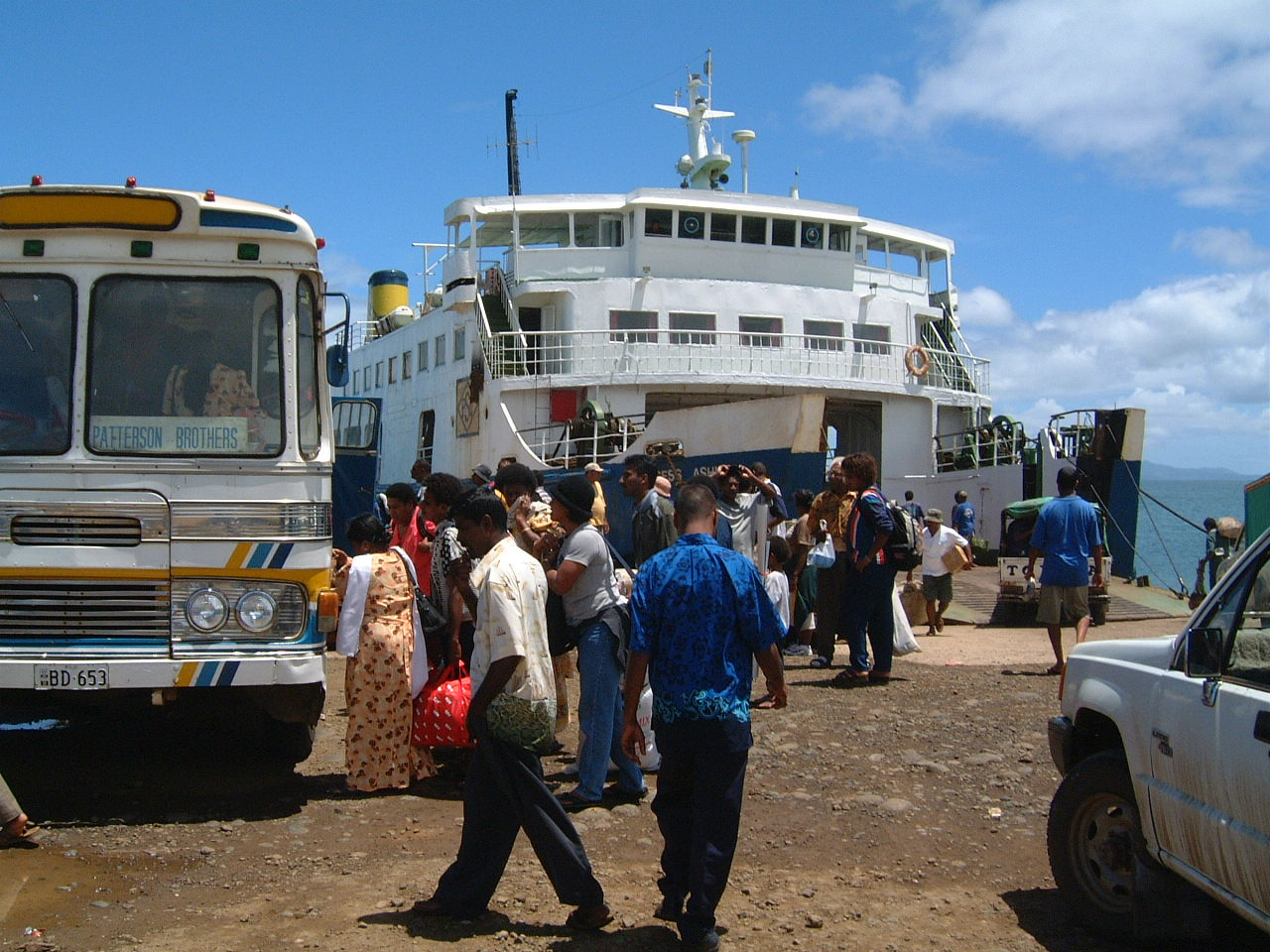
Ferry and bus at the port of Nabouwalu

The island's main population centres are the towns of Labasa, in the north, and Savusavu, located at the foot of the peninsula. Labasa, with a population of 28,500 at the 2010 census, has a large Indian community, and is a major centre of Fiji's sugar industry. Savusavu is smaller, with a population of just under 5,000, but is a popular centre for tourists owing to its diving and yachting facilities. The main industry on the island is sugar cane production, especially in the north. Copra is also an important crop. Tourism has also emerged as a significant industry on Vanua Levu.

== Politics ==
For administrative purposes, Vanua Levu is divided into three provinces: Bua (in the west), Macuata (in the north-east), and Cakaudrove (in the south-east). These three provinces also comprise the Northern Division of Fiji. Together with the remote Lau Islands, Vanua Levu and its outliers form the Tovata Confederacy, one of three traditional alliances of Fiji's chiefs. The Paramount Chief, who is based on the nearby island of Taveuni, holds the title of Tui Cakau. Only two population centres – Labasa and Savusavu – have been incorporated as Towns. Each is governed by a mayor and a Town Council, whose members are elected for a three-year term and choose the Mayor from among themselves. At present, normative local body governance is in abeyance, and all cities and towns in Fiji are being run temporarily by Special Administrators appointed by the central government.

== History ==
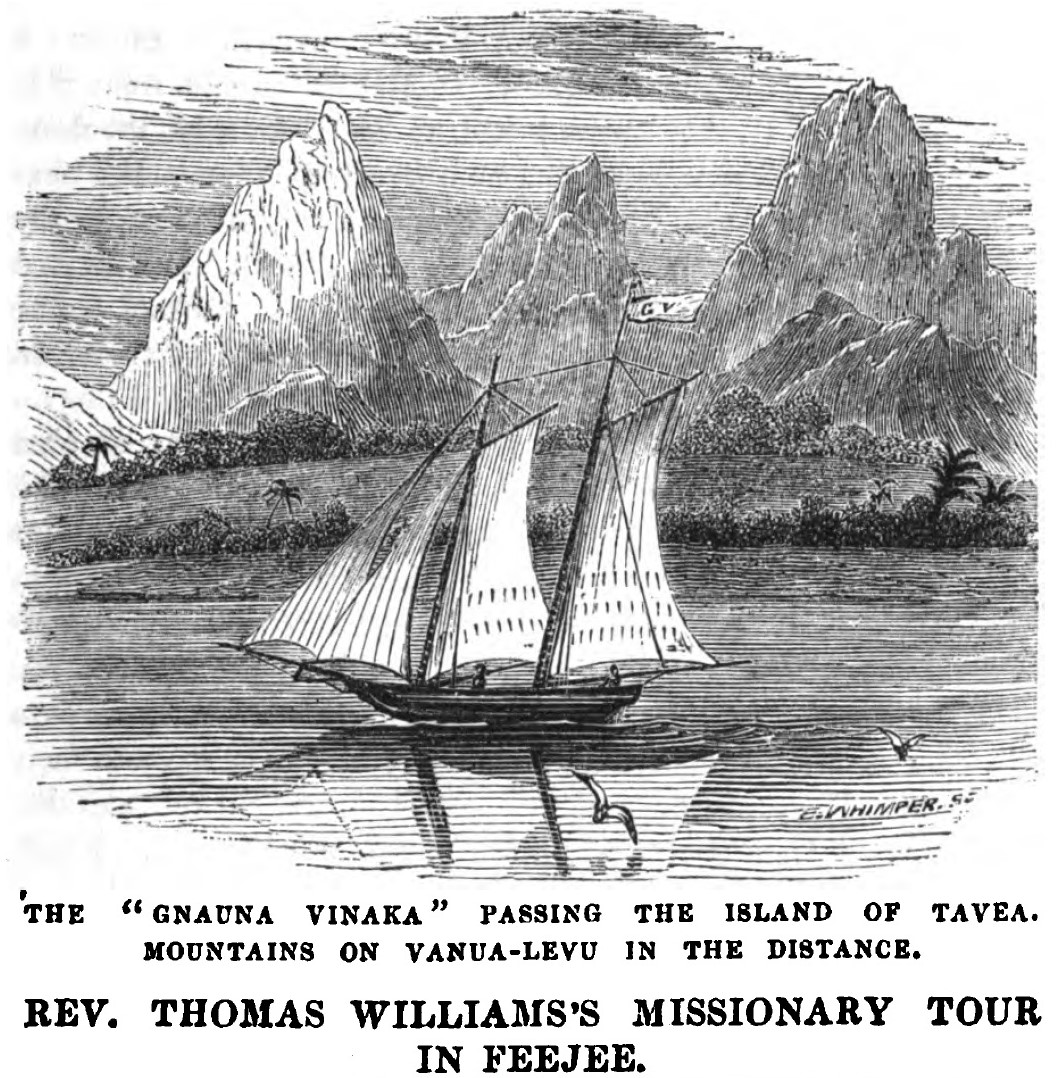
The Gnauna Vinaka Passing the Island of Tavea. Mountains of Vanua-Levu in the distance (June 1853, X, p.67)

Vanua Levu was settled about 3,100 years ago, with the settlers living in houses raised above the reefs on the shores. Between 1250 and 1350, the Pacific sea level fell 30 centimetres (12 in), exposing the tops of the reefs. This killed the abundant sea food, it also dropped the ground water table below the depth of the roots of the crops. The scarcity of food caused conflict and war. In response, the people moved from seaside villages, for mountaintop fortified villages. These forts were occupied until about 1870, with the last clear indication of warfare about 1860.

The Dutch navigator Abel Tasman was the first known European to sight Vanua Levu, in 1643. He was followed by Captain William Bligh in 1789, en route to Timor while escaping from the Mutiny on the Bounty, in which his crew had forced him and those loyal to him off deck and cast them adrift in a launch. Captain James Wilson subsequently explored the area in 1797 in his ship Duff.

Traders began exploiting sandalwood thickets in the Bua Bay area around 1805, which had been discovered by shipwrecked sailors of the schooner Argo. By 1815, however, the supply had been depleted and apart from the occasional visit from whalers and bêche-de-mer traders, the island received little further attention until 1840, when a young sailor known as Jackson deserted his crew at Somosomo, on the nearby island of Taveuni, was adopted by a local Chief, and explored much of eastern and northern Vanua Levu.

Settlers from Australia and New Zealand established coconut plantations in the Savusavu area in the 1860s. Intermarriage with Fijian people produced a mixed-race elite, which also prospered from the sale of copra, of which Savusavu was a major centre, until the Great Depression of the 1930s led to a collapse in the price of copra. In the same period, Indians founded the town of Labasa, now a major sugar-producing centre.

In March 2012, the country of Kiribati began negotiating to buy 5,000 acres (2,023 hectares) of the island to house its population, which is expected to need to move as their territory is inundated by rising sea levels.

On December 19, 2020, Cyclone Yasa impacted the island, killing at least four people and causing millions of dollars in damage. 24,000 people were evacuated from their homes.

== Transport ==
Ferry service by Gounder Shipping and Interlink connects Vanua Levu, Viti Levu and Ovalau.
