= Northern Division, Fiji =

Division of Fiji

Coordinates: 16°30′S 179°30′E

Northern Division उत्तरी प्रभाग (Fiji Hindi)
- Division
- Map of Fiji showing Northern division.
- Country: Fiji
- Capital: Labasa

Area
  - Total: 6,198 km^{2} (2,393 sq mi)

Population (2017)
  - Total: 131,918
  - Density: 21.28/km^{2} (55.13/sq mi)

The Northern Division is one of four Divisions into which Fiji's fourteen Provinces are grouped for local government purposes. The administrative centre of the Division, where main governmental departments are located, is Labasa.

The Northern Division covers three Provinces: Macuata, Cakaudrove, and Bua, and includes the entire island of Vanua Levu. This is based on the decisions of the traditional Fijian Provinces, as well as administrative considerations. Excluding the Lau Islands, which form part of the Eastern Division, the Northern Division is coextensive with the Tovata Confederacy.

Notable Fijian leaders from the Northern Division include Ratu Sir Penaia Ganilau, the first President of the Fijian republic (1987–1993). Prime Minister Sitiveni Rabuka is also from the Northern Division. Ratu Wiliame Katonivere, the current President of Fiji, is from the Northern Division.
