= Repatriation and reburial of human remains =

Ethical considerations in museum management regarding repatriation of human remains

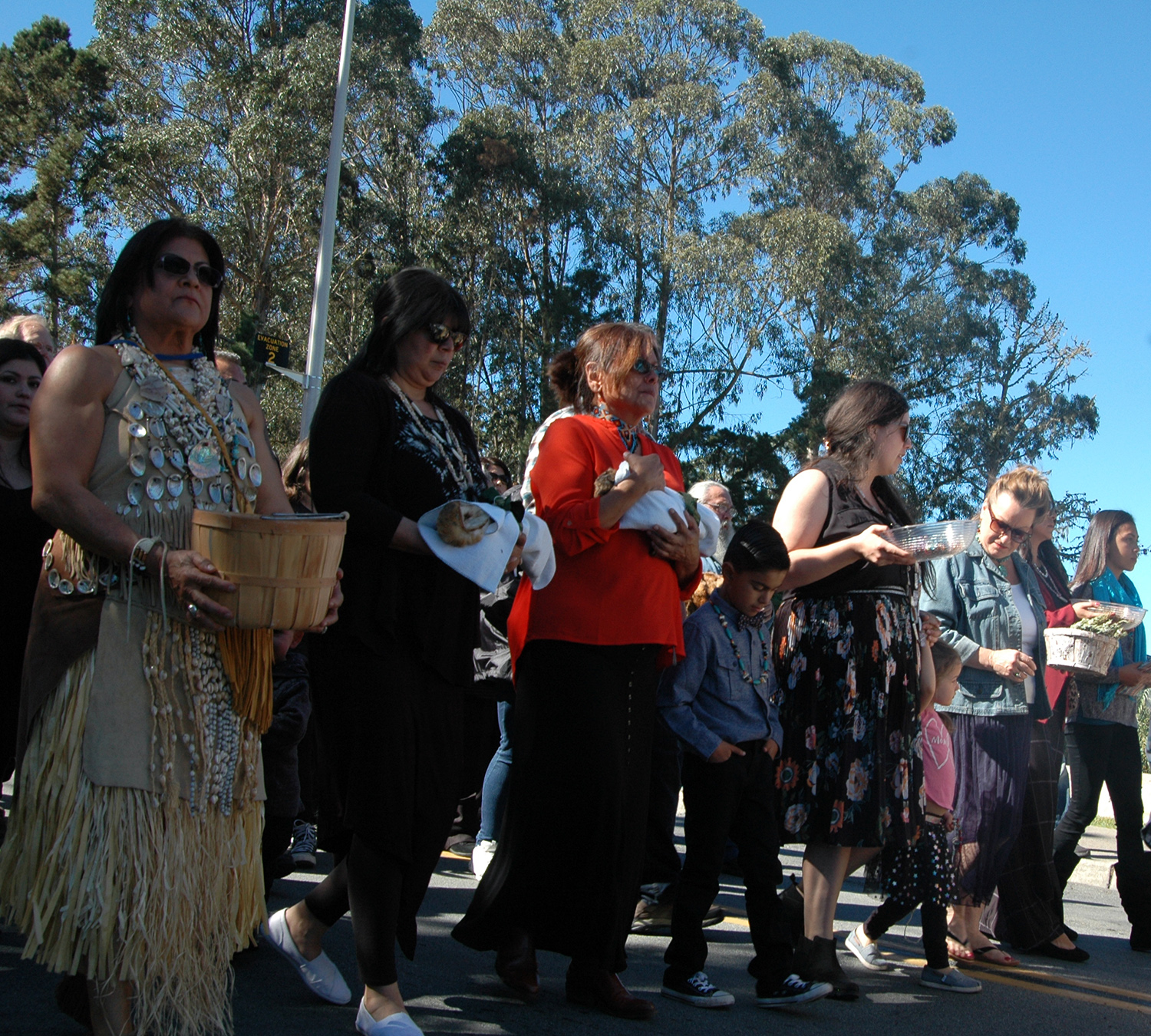
On 22 October 2017 the Presidio of Monterey hosted tribal nations in a repatriation and reburial ceremony of Native American remains in the local cemetery. The remains of 17 Native Americans and over 300 funerary objects discovered between 1910–1985 were laid to rest.

The repatriation and reburial of human remains is a current issue in archaeology and museum management on the holding of human remains. Between the descendant-source community and anthropologists, there are a variety of opinions on whether or not the remains should be repatriated. There are numerous case studies across the globe of human remains that have been or still need to be repatriated.

The issue of remains repatriation is mostly limited to those gathered via colonialism of indigenous and non-white people that are kept by museums and educational institutions, though some exceptions exist. Remain repatriation as an issue has been voiced since the late 20th century but gained major traction in the 21st century and the 2020s in particular, the issue can be seen as part of the broader movement for the Decolonization of knowledge.

== Perspectives ==
The repatriation and reburial of human remains is considered controversial within archaeological ethics. Often, descendants and people from the source community of the remains desire their return. Meanwhile, Anthropologists, scientists who study the remains for research purposes, may have differing opinions. Some anthropologists feel it is necessary to keep the remains in order to improve the field and historical understanding. Others feel that repatriation is necessary in order to respect the descendants.

=== Descendant and source community perspective ===
The descendants and source community of the remains commonly advocate for repatriation. This may be due to human rights and spiritual beliefs. For example, Henry Atkinson of the Yorta Yorta Nation describes the history that motivates this advocacy. He explains that his ancestors were invaded and massacred by the Europeans. After this, their remains were plundered and "collected like one collects stamps." Finally, the ancestors were shipped away as specimen to be studied. This made the Yorta Yorta people feel subhuman—like animals and decorative trinkets. Atkinson explains that repatriation will help to soothe the generational pain that resulted from the massacres and collections.

Additionally, there is a repeated theme that descendants have a spiritual connection to their ancestors. Many Indigenous people feel that resting places are sacred and freeing for their ancestors. However, ancestors who are boxed in foreign institutions are trapped and unable to rest. This can cause tremendous distress for their descendants. Some descendants feel that the ancestors can only be free and rest in peace after they are repatriated.

This is a similar sentiment within Botswana. Connie Rapoo, a Botswana native, explained the importance of ancestors being repatriated. Rapoo explains that people must return to their home for a sense of kinship and belonging. If they're not returned, the ancestors' souls may wander restlessly. They may even transform into evil spirits who haunt the living. They believe repatriation helps to grant peace to both ancestors and descendants.

== Historical trauma ==
The argument for repatriation is further complicated by the historical trauma that many Indigenous people experience. Historical trauma refers to the emotional trauma experienced by ancestors that is passed onto generations today. Historically, Indigenous people have experienced massacres and the loss of their children to residential schools. This immense grief is also shared and felt by descendants. Historical trauma is perpetuated by the status of ancestors being boxed away and studied. Some Indigenous people believe that the pain will be alleviated when their ancestors are repatriated and free.

== Anthropologists' perspective ==
Anthropologists have divided opinions on supporting or rejecting repatriation.

=== Anti-repatriation ===
Some anthropologists feel that repatriation will harm anthropological research and understanding. For example, Elizabeth Weiss and James W. Springer believe that repatriation is the loss of collections, and thereby the "loss of data." This is due to the nature of Western science and epistemology. To improve scientific accuracy, biological anthropologists test new methods and retest old methods on collections. Weiss and Springer describe Indigenous remains as the most abundant and significant resource to the field. They believe that reburial prevents the improvement and legitimacy of anthropological methods.

According to some anthropologists, this in turn prevents many important findings. Studying human remains may reveal information on human pre-history. It helps anthropologists learn how humans evolved and came to be. Additionally, the study of human remains reveals numerous characteristics about ancient populations. It may reveal population's health status, diseases, labor activities, and violence they experienced. Anthropology may identify cultural practices such as the cranial modification. It can also help populations today. Specifically, anthropologists have found signs of early arthritis on ancient remains. They believe this identification is beneficial for the early detection of arthritis in people today.

Some anthropologists feel that these discoveries will be lost with the reburial of human remains.

=== Pro-repatriation ===
Not all anthropologists are anti-repatriation. Rather, some feel that repatriation is an ethical necessity that the field has been neglecting. Sian Halcrow et al. explains that anthropology has a history of racist double standards. Specifically, White remains within archaeological and disaster cases are reburied in coffins. Meanwhile, Indigenous and non-White remains are infamously boxed and studied. She notes that the unethical sourcing and study of remains without permission is considered a civil rights violation. Halcrow et al. proposes that the repatriation is the bare minimum request to have one's remains treated the same as others.

Some anthropologists view repatriation—not as a privilege—but as a human right that had been refused to people of colour for too long. They don't view repatriation as the loss or downfall of anthropology. Rather, they feel that repatriation is the start of anthropology moving toward more ethical methods.

== Health considerations ==
Some of the remains were preserved with pesticides that are now known to be harmful to human health.

== Case studies ==
=== Australia ===
Aboriginal and Torres Strait Islander ancestral remains were removed from graves, burial sites, hospitals, asylums, and prisons from the 19th century through to the late 1940s. Most of those which ended up in other countries are in the United Kingdom, with many also in Germany, France, and other European countries, as well as in the US. Official figures do not reflect the true state of affairs, with many in private collections and small museums. More than 10,000 corpses or part-corpses were probably taken to the UK alone. Australia has no laws directly governing repatriation, but the Australian Government established its Policy on Indigenous Repatriation in 2011. As of 2025 it is run by the Office for the Arts. This programme "supports the repatriation of Aboriginal and Torres Strait Islander ancestral remains and secret sacred objects, which contributes to healing and reconciliation" and assists community representatives work towards repatriation of remains in various ways. In July 2020, the government promised funding to AIATSIS to implement the Return of Cultural Heritage Initiative over four years. (Note: There was previously a domestic Return of Indigenous Cultural Property (RICP) program run by the former Department of Environment, Water, Heritage and the Arts from 2007 to 2010, which supported the return of both human remains and secret sacred objects from institutions within Australia.) The government website reported that as of March 2025, 1741 Indigenous ancestors' remains had been repatriated from other countries. In April 2025 ABC News reported that over 1,775 remains had been repatriated. The majority of these – 1,300 – had been sent from collecting institutions and private holdings in the UK.

In March 2020, a documentary titled Returning Our Ancestors was released by the Victorian Aboriginal Heritage Council based on the book Power and the Passion: Our Ancestors Return Home (2010) by Shannon Faulkhead and Uncle Jim Berg, partly narrated by award-winning musician Archie Roach. It was developed primarily as a resource for secondary schools in the state of Victoria, to help develop an understanding of Aboriginal history and culture by explaining the importance of ancestral remains.

The Queensland Museum's program of returning and reburying ancestral remains which had been collected by the museum between 1870 and 1970 has been under way since the 1970s. As of November 2018, the museum had the remains of 660 Aboriginal and Torres Strait Islander people stored in its "secret sacred room" on the fifth floor.

In March 2019, 37 sets of Australian Aboriginal ancestral remains were set to be returned, after the Natural History Museum in London officially gave back the remains by means of a solemn ceremony. The remains would be looked after by the South Australian Museum and the National Museum of Australia until such time as reburial could take place.

In April 2019, work began to return more than 50 ancestral remains from five different German institutes, starting with a ceremony at the Five Continents Museum in Munich.

The South Australian Museum reported in April 2019 that it had more than 4,600 Old People in storage, awaiting reburial. Whilst many remains had been shipped overseas by its 1890s director Edward C. Stirling many more were the result of land clearing, construction projects or members of the public. With a recent change in policy at the museum, a dedicated Repatriation Officer would implement a program of repatriation.

A notorious South Australian case in 1903 involved the grave-robbing of Ngarrindjeri man Tommy Walker by the SA state coroner, Dr William Ramsay Smith. This exposed a broader, hidden trade in mainly Aboriginal human remains by medical and scientific institutions to supply UK institutions. Public outrage over the scandal highlighted deep cultural violations and contributed to a struggle for repatriation that would span more than a century.

In April 2019, the skeletons of 14 Yawuru and Karajarri people which had been sold by a wealthy Broome pastoralist and pearler to a museum in Dresden in 1894 were brought home to Broome, in Western Australia. The remains, which had been stored in the Grassi Museum of Ethnology in Leipzig, showed signs of head wounds and malnutrition, a reflection of the poor conditions endured by Aboriginal people forced to work on the pearling boats in the 19th century. The Yawuru and Karajarri people were still in negotiations with the Natural History Museum in London to enable the release of the skull of the warrior known as Gwarinman.

On 1 August 2019, the remains of 11 Kaurna people which had been returned from the UK were laid to rest at a ceremony led by elder Jeffrey Newchurch at Kingston Park Coastal Reserve, south of the city of Adelaide. In November 2021, the South Australian Museum apologised to the Kaurna people for having taken their ancestors' remains, and buried 100 of them a new 2 ha (4.9-acre) site at Smithfield Memorial Park, donated by Adelaide Cemeteries. The memorial site is in the shape of the Kaurna shield, to protect the ancestors buried there. In October 2025, many more Kaurna remains were buried at the site, after being repatriated from state government agency Aboriginal Affairs and Reconciliation, as well as Adelaide and Edinburgh universities.

In October 2023, the Austrian Academy of Sciences handed over to Australia the remains of six Aboriginal ancestors that had been part of the Pöch collection. The remains of 47 further Aborigines had been returned previously, between 2009 and 2011.

In mid-April 2025, the Natural History Museum in London handed over the remains of a further 36 ancestors in a formal ceremony at the institution.

=== New Zealand ===
Te Papa, the national museum in Wellington was mandated by the government in 2003 to manage the Karanga Aotearoa Repatriation Programme (KARP) to repatriate Māori and Moriori remains (kōiwi tangata). Te Papa researches the provenance of remains and negotiates with overseas institutions for their return. Once returned to New Zealand the remains are not accessioned by Te Papa as the museum arranges their return to their iwi (iwi). Remains have been repatriated from Argentina, Australia, Austria, Canada, Denmark, France, Germany, Ireland, Netherlands, Norway, Sweden, Switzerland, United States and the United Kingdom. Between 2003 and 2015 the return of 355 remains was negotiated by KARP.

Heritage New Zealand has a policy on repatriation. In 2018 the Ministry for Culture and Heritage published a report on Human Remains in New Zealand Museums and The New Zealand Repatriation Research Network was established for museums to work together to research the provenance of remains and assist repatriation. Museums Aotearoa adopted a National Repatriation Policy in 2021.

=== Canada ===
During the 1800s, Canada established numerous residential schools for Indigenous youth. This was an act of cultural assimilation and genocide where many of the children died and were buried at these schools. In the 21st century, these mass graves are being discovered and repatriated. Two of the most well-known mass graves includes those at the Kamloops Indian Residential School (over 200 Indigenous children buried) and the Saskatchewan Residential School (over 700 Indigenous children buried). Canada is working on searching for and repatriating these graves.

=== France ===
During the French colonization of Algeria, 24 Algerians fought the colonial forces in 1830 and in an 1849 revolt. They were decapitated and their skulls were taken to France as trophies. In 2011, Ali Farid Belkadi, an Algerian historian, discovered the skulls at the Museum of Man in Paris and alerted Algerian authorities that consequently launched the formal repatriation request, the skulls were returned in 2020. Between the remains were those of revolt leader Sheikh Bouzian, who was captured in 1849 by the French, shot and decapitated, and the skull of resistance leader Mohammed Lamjad ben Abdelmalek, also known as Cherif Boubaghla (the man with the mule).

==== Toera's Skull ====
Toera was a Sakalava king and slave trader who led a rebellion against French rule in 1897 after they restricted the slave trade. French forces defeated the rebellion and killed and decapitated Toera, it is believed his skull was sent to the archives of the National Museum of Natural History in Paris. More then a century later the government of Madagascar and Toera's descendants began pressuring for the skull to be repatriated. In 2018 DNA tests on the presumed skull of Toera were unconclusive so it was decided to consult a traditional Sakalava spirit medium, the medium was "possessed" by Toera who recognized the skull as his own from a photograph. The skull and two others were returned in 2025 with plans to reattach it to Toera's skeleton. After repatriation Toera's great-great-grandson said they were happy that it was returned to his homeland, but disliked that it was given to the government of Madagascar instead of Toera's currently living family.

=== Germany ===
In 2023 seven German museums and universities returned Māori and Moriori remains to the Museum of New Zealand Te Papa Tongarewa in New Zealand.

=== Austria ===
Between 2009 and 2023, the Austrian Academy of Sciences has returned the human remains of an estimated 53 Aborigines to Australia. These had been collected by Rudolf Pöch during his expedition in the region between 1901 and 1906. From the same Pöch collection, the Academy of Sciences also returned the remains of an elderly San couple, Klaas and Trooi Pienaar, to South Africa in April 2012, leading to an official reburial in August 2012.

In 2022 the Natural History Museum, Vienna returned the remains of about 64 Māori and Moriori people, collected by Andreas Reischek, to Museum of New Zealand Te Papa Tongarewa in Wellington, New Zealand.

=== Estonia ===
President Konstantin Päts was imprisoned in the USSR after the Soviet invasion and occupation, where he died in 1956. In 1988, efforts began to locate Päts' remains in Russia. It was discovered that Päts had been granted a formal burial service, fitting of his office, near Kalinin (now Tver). On 22 June 1990, his grave was dug up and the remains were reburied in Tallinn Metsakalmistu cemetery on 21 October 1990. In 2011, a commemorative cross was placed in Burashevo village, where Päts was once buried.

=== Ireland ===
The British anthropologist Alfred Cort Haddon removed 13 skulls from a graveyard on Inishmore, and more skulls from Inishbofin, County Galway, and a graveyard in Ballinskelligs, County Kerry, as part of the Victorian-era study of "racial types". The skulls are still in storage at Trinity College Dublin and their return to the cemeteries of origin has been requested, and the board of Trinity College has signalled its willingness to work with islanders to return the remains to the island.

On 24 February 2023, Trinity College Dublin confirmed that the human remains, including 13 skulls, in their possession would be returned to Inishbofin. This process is to formally begin in July 2023, with similar repatriation of remains at St. Finian's Bay and Inishmore to be started later in the year.

=== Serbia ===
King Peter II of Yugoslavia fled to the United Kingdom after the Nazi invasion and occupation. After the founding of the Socialist Federal Republic of Yugoslavia in 1945 Peter fled to the United States, where he died in 1970, and was buried in Saint Sava Monastery Church at Libertyville, Illinois. In 2007 his son Alexander announced plans to have his parents' remains returned to Serbia. In January 2013, King Peter's grave was dug up and the remains were reburied in Oplenac in Serbia on 26 May 2013.

=== South Africa ===
==== Sarah Baartman ====
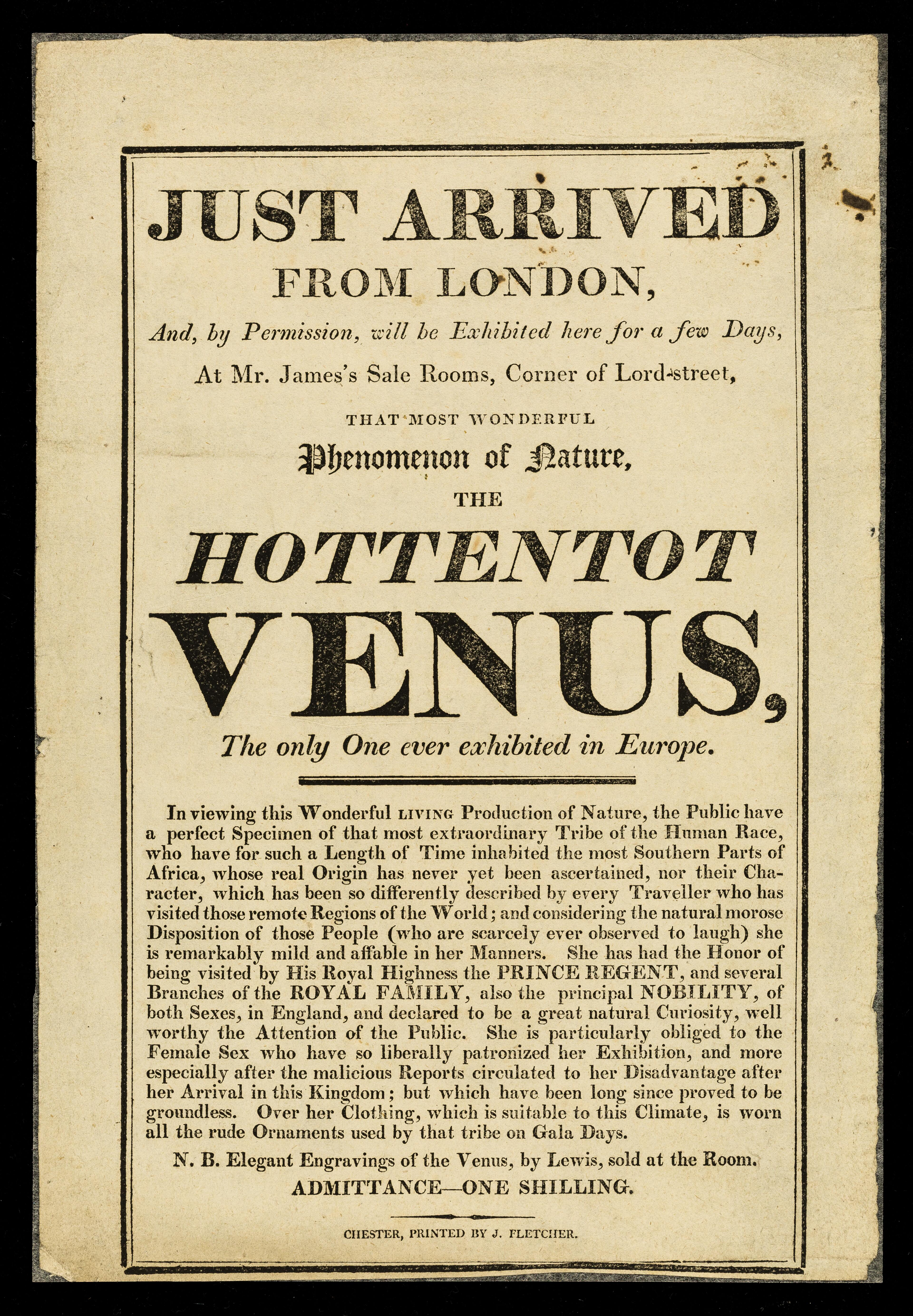
An ephemera advertising Sarah Baartman as the "Hottentot Venus" for public amusement.

Sarah Baartman was a Khoikhoi woman from Cape Town, South Africa, in the early 1800s. She was taken to Europe and advertised as a sexual "freak" for entertainment. She was known as the "Hottentot Venus." She died in 1815 and was dissected. Baartman's genitalia, brain, and skeleton were displayed in the Musee de l'Homme in Paris until repatriation to South Africa in 2002.

==== Klaas and Trooi Pienaar ====
Mr Klaas and Trooi Pienaar were an elderly San couple living in the southern part of the Kalahari. At the time of Rudolf Pöch's expedition through Southern Africa to study the San peoples, it is alleged that Pöch asked his assistant Mr Menharto to retrieve bodies from their burial sites to bring them to Vienna for Racial anthropological studies. Unlike other bodies, the remains of Klaas and Trooi Pienaar were transported in a barrel of salt. In April 2012, the Austrian Academy of Sciences returned their remains to South Africa, leading to an official reburial in August 2012.

==== Kinderlê Reburial ====
the ancestral remains of 63 persons of Khoe and San descent, who had been taken from the Namaqualand between 1868 and 1924 for race-based scientific research, without the consent of the relevant communities, were repatriated in 2025 from the University of Glasgow in Scotland, where they had been kept at the Hunterian Museum. These bodies were reburied at the Kinderlê monument near Steinkopf, South Africa, on 23 March 2026.

=== Spain ===
==== El Negro ====
The name "El Negro" refers to a dead African man who was taxidermized and displayed in the Darder Museum in Banyoles, Spain. His initial grave had been dug up in 1830. He was then taxidermized with his skin mounted onto a mainly artificial frame. "El Negro" was eventually incorporated into the Darder Museum at it's founding and displayed there for over 80 years. It wasn't until 1992 when Banyoles was hosting the summer Olympics that people complained of the displayed and taxidermized human remains.

In 2000, "El Negro" was repatriated to Botswana, which was believed to be his country of origin at the time. Numerous Botswanans had gathered in the airport to greet "El Negro." However, there was controversy in the status and shipment of his remains. First, "El Negro" had arrived in a box, rather than a coffin. Botswanans felt this was dehumanizing. Second, "El Negro" was not returned as the whole body. Rather, only a stripped skull was sent to Botswana. The Spanish had decided to separate the artificial and biological elements before the return, and they decided to keep the skin due to its brittleness; they also claimed the artifacts and non-biological elements to be their property. Numerous Botswanans felt severely disrespected and offended by the objectification of "El Negro."

=== United Kingdom ===
The skeleton of the "Irish Giant" Charles Byrne (1761–1783) was on public display in the Hunterian Museum, London despite it being Byrne's express wish to be buried at sea. Author Hilary Mantel called in 2020 for his remains to be returned to Ireland. It was removed from public display as part of redevelopment work in the late 2010s early 2020s although Byrne's skeleton was retained in the museum collection to allow for future research.

==== Druids ====
The Neo-druidic movement is a modern religion, with some groups originating in the 18th century and others in the 20th century. They are generally inspired by either Victorian-era ideas of the druids of the Iron Age, or later neopagan movements. Some practice ancestor veneration, and because of this may believe that they have a responsibility to care for the ancient dead where they now live. In 2006 Paul Davies requested that the Alexander Keiller Museum in Avebury, Wiltshire rebury their Neolithic human remains, and that storing and displaying them was "immoral and disrespectful". The National Trust refused to allow reburial, but did allow for Neo-druids to perform a healing ritual in the museum.

The archaeological community has voiced criticism of the Neo-druids, making statements such as "no single modern ethnic group or cult should be allowed to appropriate our ancestors for their own agendas. It is for the international scientific community to curate such remains." An argument proposed by archaeologists is that:

"Druids are not the only people who have feelings about human remains... We don't know much about the religious beliefs of these [Prehistoric] people, but know that they wanted to be remembered, their stories, mounds and monuments show this. Their families have long gone, taking all memory with them, and we archaeologists, by bringing them back into the world, are perhaps the nearest they have to kin. We care about them, spending our lives trying to turn their bones back into people... The more we know the better we can remember them. Reburying human remains destroys people and casts them into oblivion: this is at best, misguided, and at worse cruel."

Mr. Davies thanked English Heritage for their time and commitment given to the whole process and concluded that the dialogue used within the consultation focussed on museum retention and not reburial as requested.

=== United States ===
The Native American Graves Protection and Repatriation Act (NAGPRA), passed in 1990, provides a process for museums and federal agencies to return certain cultural items such as human remains, funerary objects, sacred objects, etc. to lineal descendants and culturally affiliated Indian tribes and Native Hawaiian organisations. ProPublica tracks the repatriation of Native American remains. As of January 2025, 650 institutions report having remains. 42% of remains have not been made available for repatriation. Ten institutions hold about half of the reported remains that have not been made available to tribes, with Ohio History Connection topping the list.

==== Ishi ====
Ishi was the last survivor of the Yahi Tribe in the early 1900s. He lived amongst and was studied by anthropologists for the rest of his life. During this time, he would tell stories of his tribe, give archery demonstrations, and be studied on his language. Ishi fell ill and died from tuberculosis in 1916.

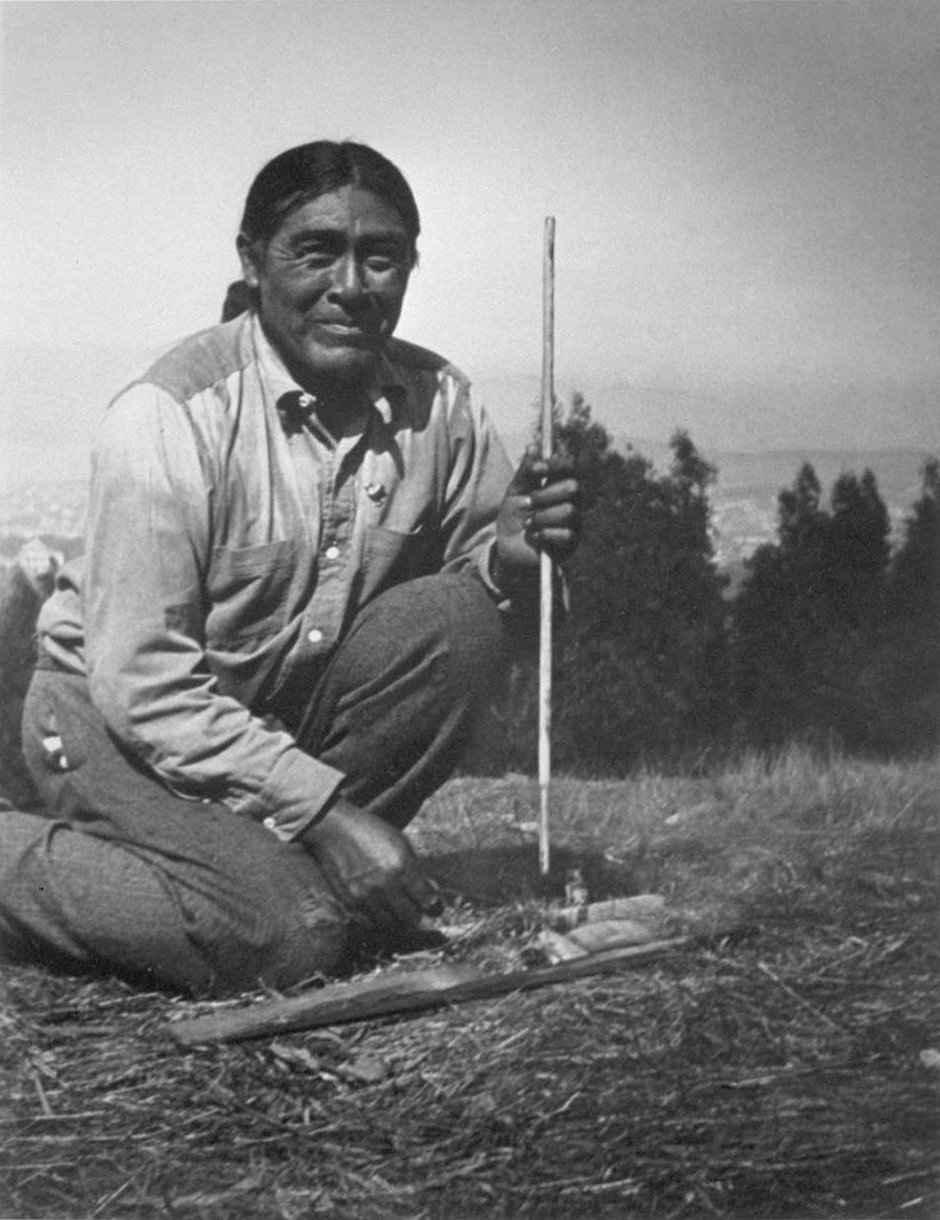
Ishi of the Yahi tribe making fire

Ishi had explicit wishes to be cremated intact. However, against these wishes, his body underwent an autopsy. His brain was removed and forgotten in a Smithsonian warehouse. Finally, in 2000, Ishi's brain had been found and returned to the Pit River tribe.

==== Kennewick Man ====
The Kennewick Man is the name generally given to the skeletal remains of a prehistoric Paleoamerican man found on a bank of the Columbia River in Kennewick, Washington, United States, on 28 July 1996, which became the subject of a controversial nine-year court case between the United States Army Corps of Engineers, scientists, the Umatilla people and other Native American tribes who claimed ownership of the remains.

The remains of Kennewick Man were finally removed from the Burke Museum of Natural History and Culture on 17 February 2017. The following day, more than 200 members of five Columbia Plateau tribes were present at a burial of the remains.

=== Fiji ===
Mana, a complete human skeleton discovered in Moturiki in 2002, belonging to a Lapita woman that lived in or about 800 BCE, was formally re-buried at the archaeological site where she was found in 2003, after being heavily studied for a year.

== See also ==
- Repatriation (cultural heritage)
