= National Museum of Vanuatu =

Museum in Port Vila, Vanuatu

Coordinates: 17.7452°S 168.3175°E

- Nasonal Miusium blong Vanuatu
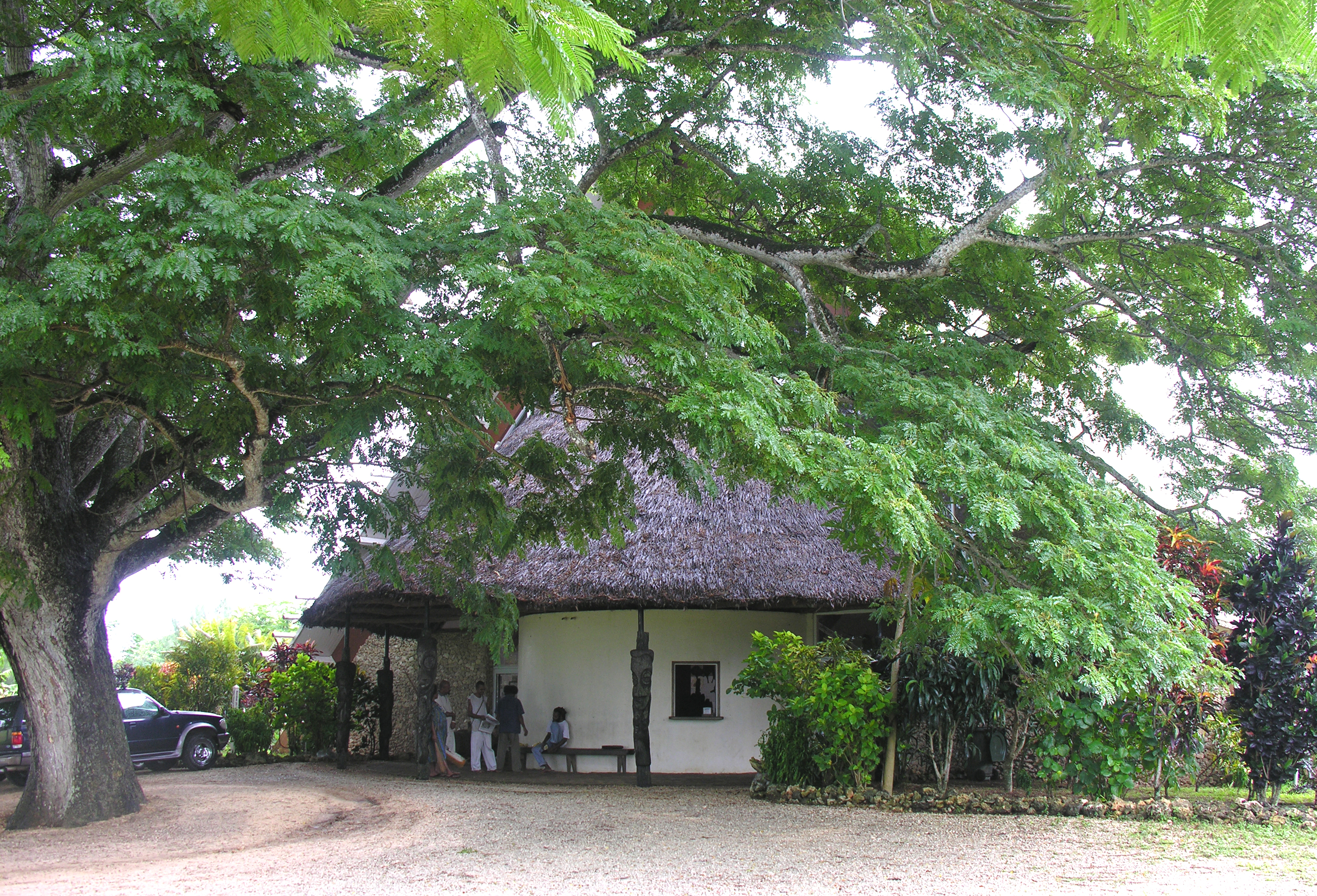
- Established: 1960
- Location: Port Vila, Vanuatu
- Type: Governmental
- Website: https://www.vanuatu.travel/en/local-knowledge/vanuatu-cultural-center

The National Museum of Vanuatu (Bislama: Nasonal Miusium blong Vanuatu) is located in the Vanuatu Cultural Centre (VCC) in Port Vila, Vanuatu. It specializes in exhibits relating to the culture and history of this group of islands in the South Pacific. It is unique amongst Pacific national cultural institutions for rejecting many aspects of European museology, and creating new ways of working which value kastom practices.

== Background ==
The Vanuatu Cultural Centre was founded in 1959. From its inception, it was designed to encompass a National Museum of Vanuatu. By 1960 a Board of Management was established with British, French and ni-Vanuatu members. In the early years the museum focussed on exhibitions, mostly of collections formed by colonisers. Its first site was on the waterfront of Port Vila.

In 1989 leadership of the museum passed from the expatriate anthropologist Kirk Huffman, to ni-Vanuatu Jack Keitadi.

=== Official opening ===
In 1995 the VCC and the museum moved to a new purpose-built structure in Port Vila. The new building was 45 metres long and 20 metres wide, and its architectural design was inspired by buildings from the northern islands. Its official opening was held at 9.30am on 17 November 1995, and was preceded by four days of ritual and cultural activity. This festival brought people from a range of communities to the capital and emphasised the museum also belonged to them. The opening ceremony involved gift-giving and a "Kastom dedication" of the building. The "Kastom dedication" included covering the building with a spiritual net and the sacrifice of a specially selected pig. The date of the museum opening, 17 November, was also dedicated as National Cultural Day.

=== Building ===
The museum is within the shared structure, which contains an exhibition hall, where displays regularly change. The museum also has an archival space, known in 2003 as the Tabu Room, where kastom objects can be deposited by their owners for safekeeping, but where access to them is also kept along kastom traditions. The museum also has storage space, where objects that cannot be displayed are kept, either because they are fragile, or because they are the subject of dispute.

=== Public engagement ===
The museum runs a Kastom School where traditional arts and stories are passed on to young people from Vanuatu. In 2020 the museum hosted an exhibition on the history of archaeological research in Vanuatu. In 2021 the museum was the location of the launch of Vanuatu's first anthology of women's writing Sista, Stanap Strong! Exhibitions in the 1990s included: money, contemporary art, domestic spaces.

== Collections ==
Intangible heritage in Vanuatu

The National Museum of Vanuatu has a collection that includes archaeological and ethnographic objects, as well as biological and geological specimens, from the country. The collection includes: masks, slit gongs, model canoes, pottery, animal and birds specimens from each island, as well as archaeological archives relating to the material culture of the first inhabitants. The geology collection includes bones belonging to the meiolaniid family of megafaunal horned turtles. The remains were excavated from the Teouma site, which was inhabited by Lapita people; the site provides the earliest evidence for human-meiolaniid interaction. Ceramic material from the archaeology collection includes Lapita pottery and Wusi pottery from Espiritu Santo. The archaeology collection also includes a photographic archive, which includes images of the excavation of Chief Roi Mata's burial site. Another photographic archive records the tradition of sand drawing from the islands, which appears on UNESCO's List of Intangible Cultural Heritage.

=== Digital collecting ===
Digital collecting has been an important aspect of the museum's work since 1976 when an Oral Traditions Project was founded. The project trained ni-Vanuatu men to record oral traditions. In 1990 this programme involved to include the collection of women's oral traditions, as well as men's, and was led by Jean Tarissei. By 1994 this programme had developed into the Vanuatu Culture Centre Women Fieldworker Network.

==== Connections to the Independence movement ====
During the 1970s, at the same time as the museum was starting its oral collecting programme, the independence movement in Vanuatu was developing, following the establishment of the Vanua'aku Pati in 1971. The party stressed the importance of kastom, in particular as a way to unite ni-Vanuatu against both the colonial rule of the Anglo-French Condominium. This meant that the importance of kastom became part of a national discourse. In 1980, post-independence, the Oral Traditions Project developed into the Vanuatu Cultural Centre Fieldworker Network.

=== Research ===
In 1994 the museum began a long-term partnership with the Australian National University in order to co-operate to solve some of the gaps in the ni-Vanuatu archaeological record. Excavations have been undertaken at several sites, including: Erromango (1994), Maluku Islands (1995), Mangaasi on Efate (1996–99), Teouma (2004-06). The excavations at Mangaasi were the first to include a comprehensive archaeological training programme for ni-Vanuatu. In 2002 the German painter Ingo Kühl, after participating in an expedition of the Cultural Center to ceremonies of the indigenous people on Malakula, his works that were created there were shown in an exhibition at the National Museum of Vanuatu and in 2004–2005 at the Ethnological Museum of Berlin. In November 2006 a major conference was held at the museum, which was the first time an international conference on ni-Vanuatu cultural heritage was held in the country.

=== Collections management ===
In 2004 an in-house, electronic collections management system was designed in order to effectively manage physical and digital collections, as well as to accurately represent the relationships that are so important in ni-Vanuatu culture. The system became known as the Vanuatu Cultural Information Network (VCIN). It was designed to work effectively in all three main languages: English, French and Bislama, but is less effective in other endemic languages. The database also records which objects are tabu, and who may access them, for example "family only" or "village - female only". However, in 2019, as a result of a lack of sustained funding, the catalogue had been "de-aggregated".

== Museology ==
The museum does not follow European museological traditions. For the ni-Vanuatu who visit, objects are inextricably linked to social networks and the museum has worked hard with communities and researchers across the islands to record these connections and their significance. This indigenous understanding of material culture is one that is rarely adopted and continued by the museums of colonised countries. Kirk Huffman emphasised the importance of the "unique, quasi-spiritual" operations of the museum: "There is much in Vanuatu's cultures that is tabu, that the outside world does not need to know, nor have the right to know, and these restrictions must be respected."

== Repatriation ==
In 2003 it was noted that absences in the collections included: material related to missionary activity, nationalism in Vanuatu, and material culture relating to cargo cults, for example those of John Frum. However, much missionary material culture that relates to Vanuatu is held in overseas collections, particularly in countries connected to Scottish Presbyterianism. Many other countries host ethnographic and scientific specimens from Vanuatu, as a result of colonial collecting practices.

=== Lengnangulong sacred stone ===
Since 1997 the original owners of the Lengnangulong sacred stone, which is from the village of Magam on North Ambryn, have requested either the repatriation of the object or formal acknowledgement of their ownership from the Louvre. It was collected by Jean Guiart, a French anthropologist in 1949. Whilst the original is in Paris, in the Pavillon des Sessions of the Musée du Louvre, a copy of the stone is displayed at the National Museum of Vanuatu. In Vanuatu, ownership of the stone according the kastom is recognised as Zaki Tubuvi. Whilst Guiart paid a small amount of money for the stone, he did not pay the kastom owners - Tubuvi - and so according to ni-Vanuatu culture, Guiart's act is equivalent to stealing as he ignored traditional practice. As of 2017, the stone had not been returned or traditional ownership acknowledged.

=== Objects held in overseas collections ===
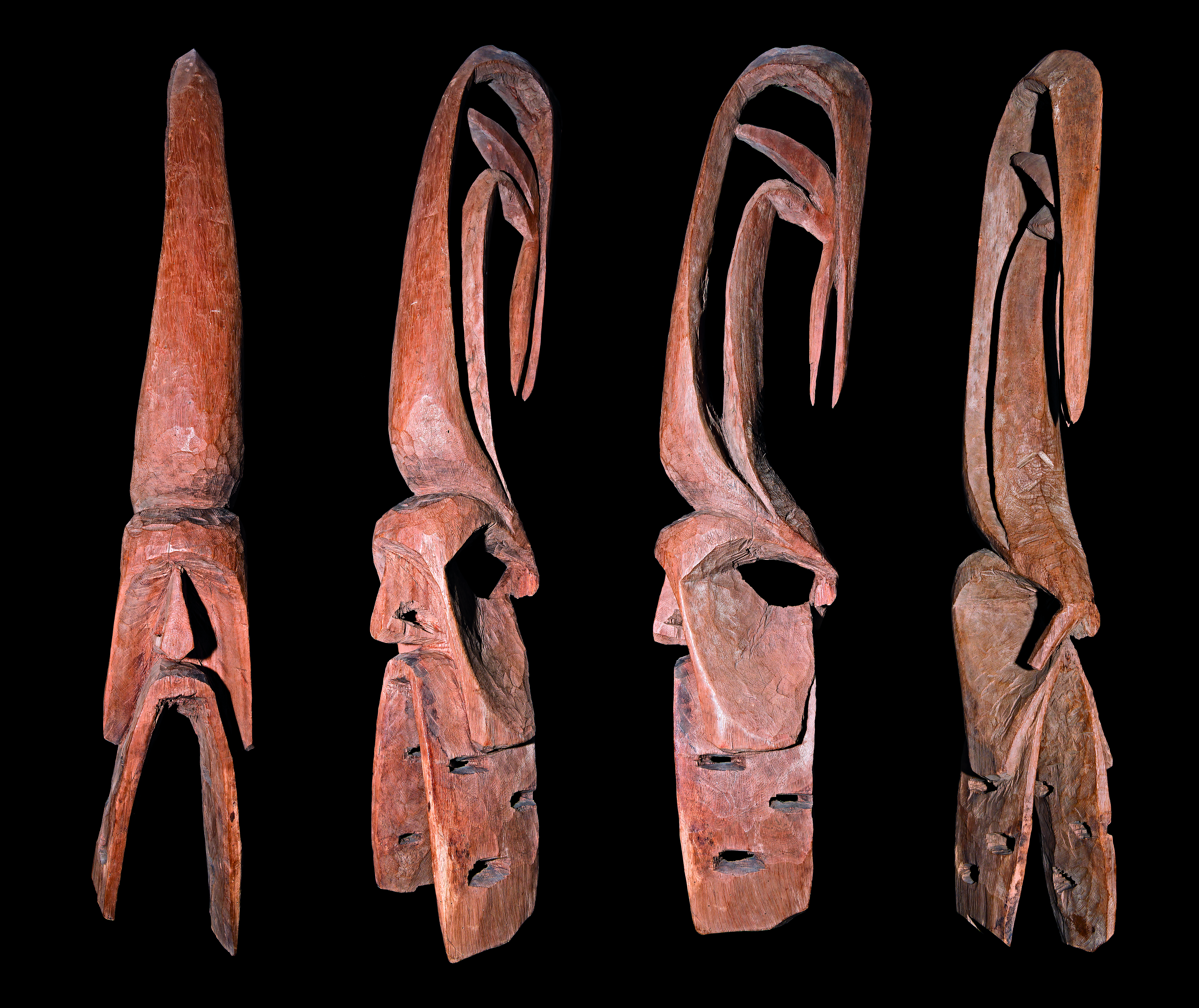
Pacific canoe prow, featuring a frigate bird, from the island of Vao, now at Museum of Toulouse.

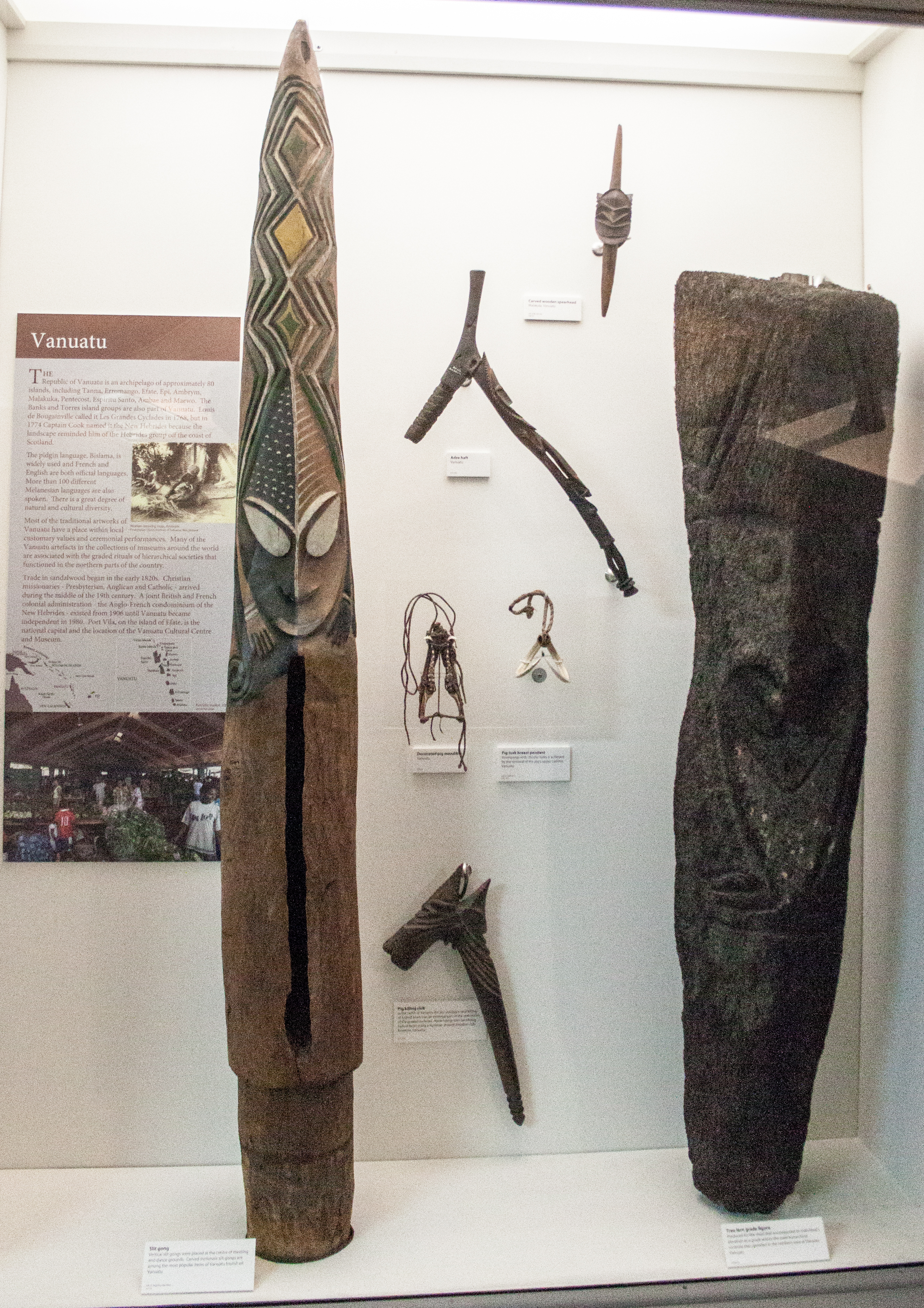
Display of ni-Vanuatu objects in Otago Museum

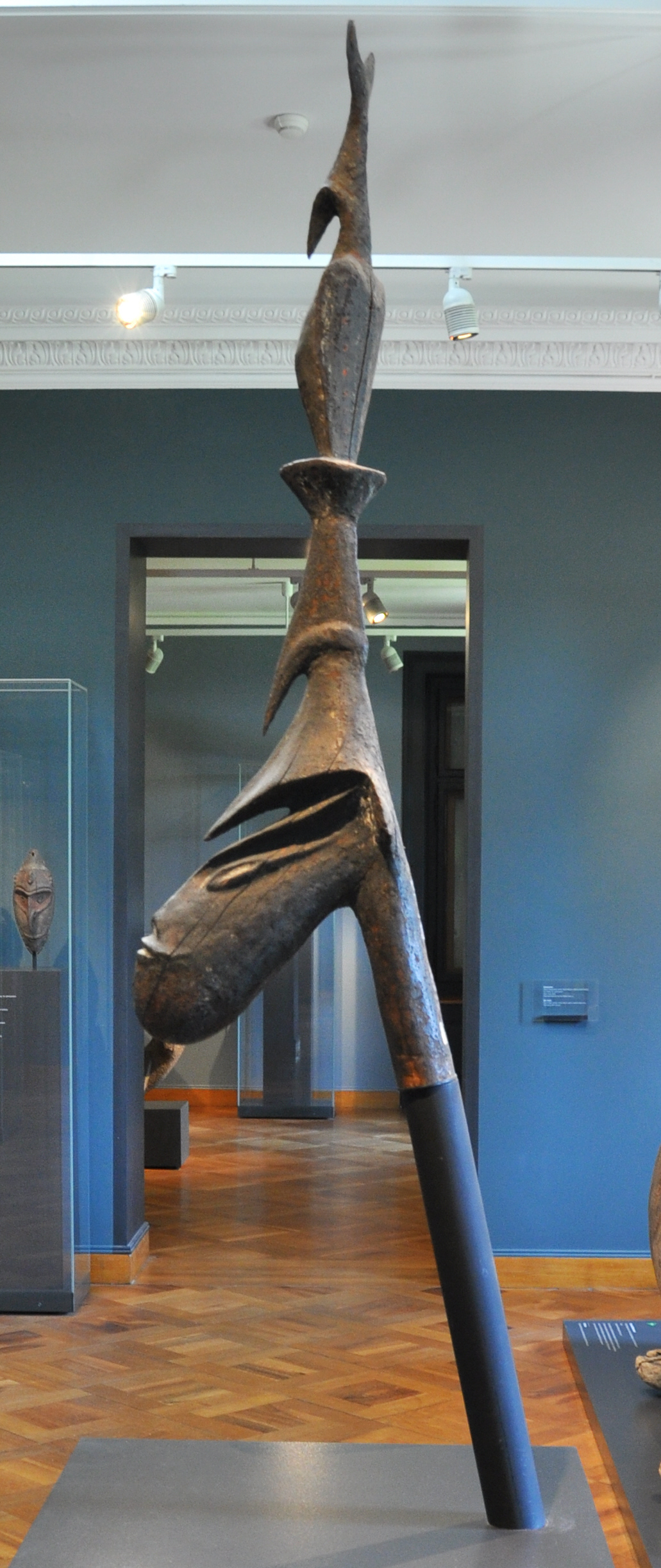
Ceremonial club, from Ambrym or Malakula, held at Museum Rietberg

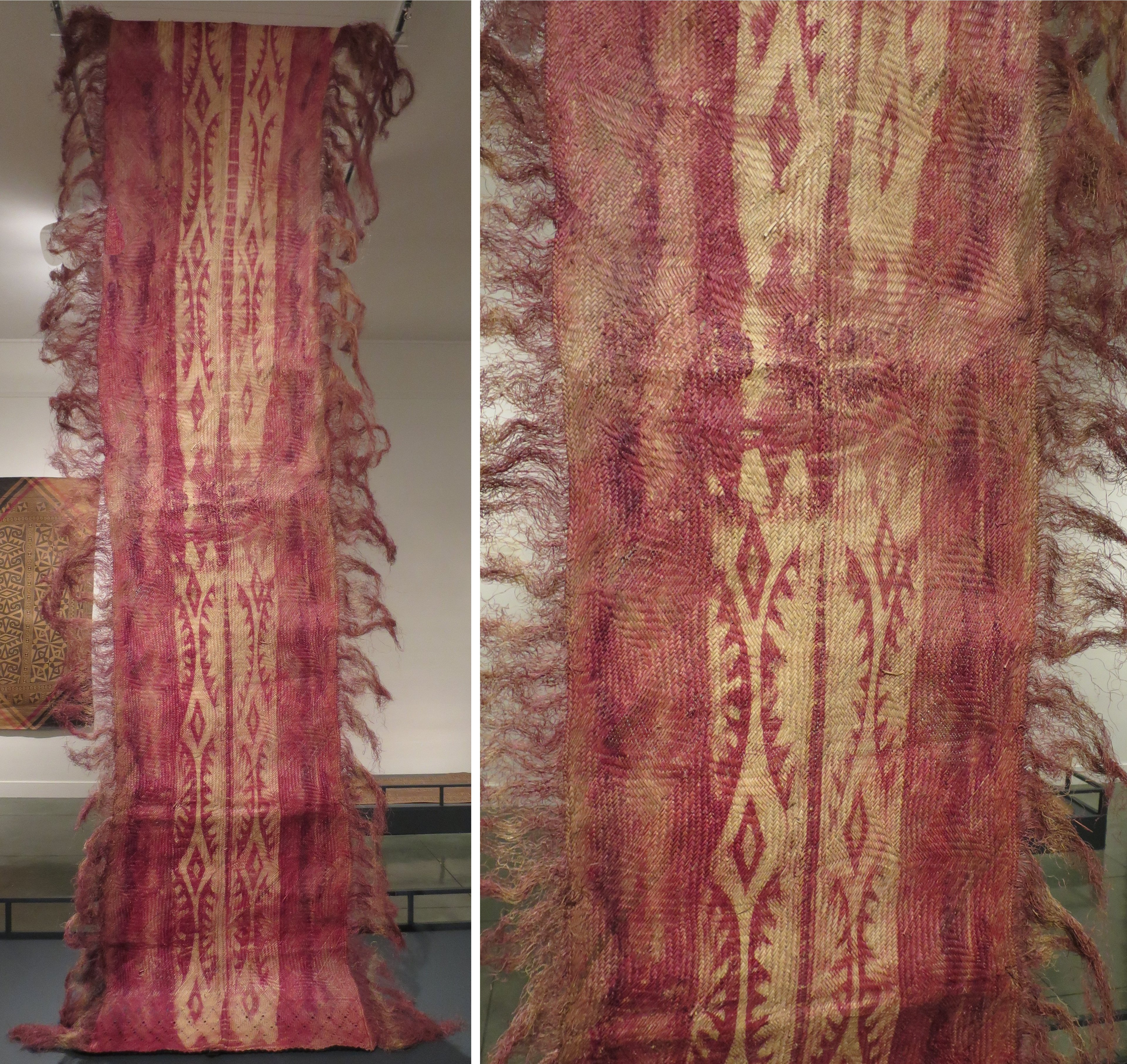
Sese (red mat) from Pentecost Island, 20th century, pandanus (Pandanus tectorius), Laba (Rhamnus ventilago neocaledonica), dye, stencil resist and plaiting, Honolulu Museum of Art.

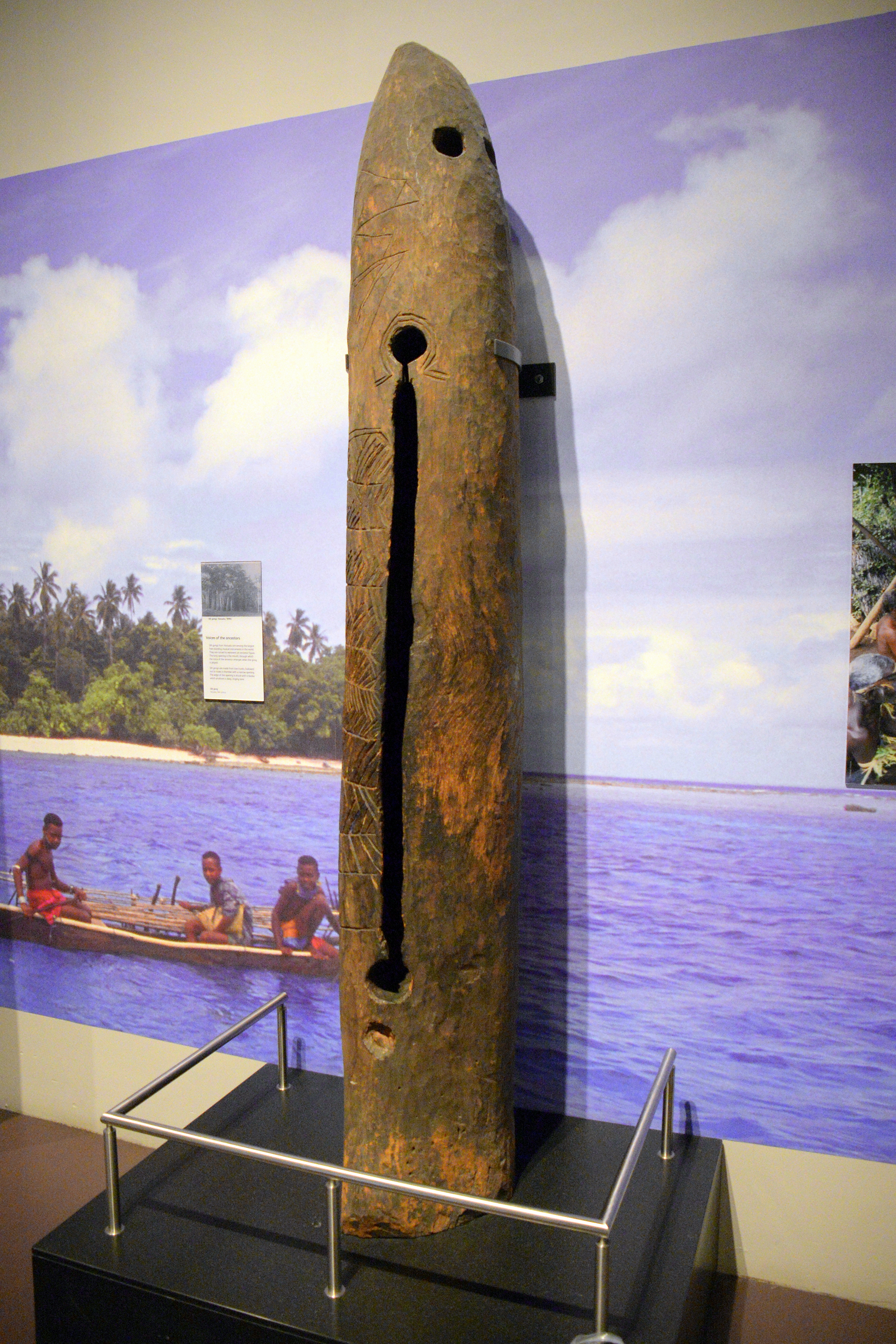
Slit gong, from Vanuatu, held at National Museum of Scotland

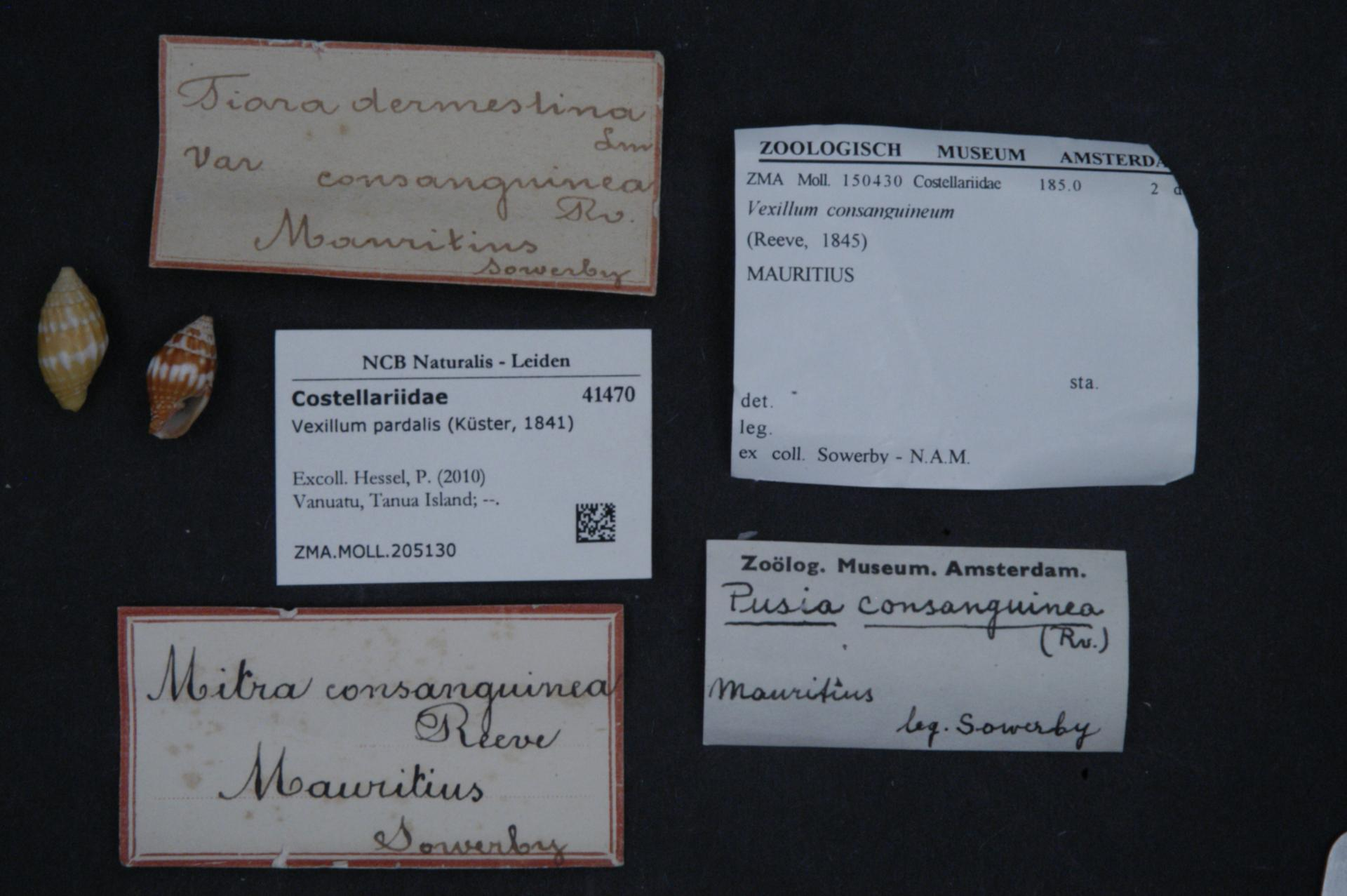
Molluscs from Zoological Museum, Amsterdam

== Notable people ==
- Marcellin Abong - curator
- Kirk Huffman - former curator, 1977–90.
- Nadia Kanegai - fieldworker
- Jack Keitadi - first ni-Vanuatu curator
- Clarence Marae - former ni-Vanuatu curator
- Ralph Regenvanu - former ni-Vanuatu curator
- Richard Shing - acting director (2017).
