= Georg Pöch =

Austrian Nazi and doctor

Georg Anton Pöch better known as Dr. Pöch (born 1895 in Premissel, Austria-Hungary (now Przemyśl, Poland) – died 15 January 1970 in Surabaya, Indonesia at the age of 75) was an Austrian doctor who worked in Sumbawa, believed by many to be a secret identity of Adolf Hitler.

== Biography ==
He studied medicine at the University of Graz and received his doctorate in 1921. From 1921 to 1922 he was a secondary doctor in Graz and set up the children's health service in Salzburg on behalf of the Commonwealth Fund. From 1924 to 1929 he was in charge of maternal health care in Salzburg, then in Eisenstadt until 1935. On 29 May 1938 he applied for admission to the Nazi Party and was admitted retrospectively to May 1. From November 1938 to September 1939 he worked in the public health department of the Reich Ministry of the Interior in Berlin. From 1940 he headed Sub-Department IIIa (Healthcare and Physical Education) and Department IIa/2 for "Heritage and Racial Care" at the Reich Governor of Salzburg. He worked at the hereditary health court in Salzburg, where he was jointly responsible for measures to prepare for euthanasia.

After the end of National Socialism, the couple was interrogated by the US-CIC in Salzburg. He evaded Austrian justice by fleeing for many years, first via Bolzano to Indonesia (there from 1954), where Georg Pöch ran a clinic in Sumbawa Besar after stations in Dompu and Bima and died of a heart attack in Surabaya in 1970. Before that, according to Peter Levenda, he is said to have converted to Islam.

== Personal life ==
Georg was the son of Major Josef Pöch. On 26 December 1924 Georg Pöch married the anthropologist Hella Pöch, the widow of his uncle, the anthropologist Rudolf Pöch. While in Indonesia, Pöch married a Sundanese woman named Sulaesih and later died at the Karang Menjangan Hospital and was buried in the North Ngagel Public Cemetery, Jalan Bung Tomo, Surabaya. The story of Pöch was later documented by Dr. Sosrohusodo before finally being disseminated to the mass media.

Although many believe he was Hitler hiding under an assumed identity, sceptics argue there are differences between the two such as in the shape of the forehead and hair and the shape of the ears.

== Literature ==
- Volkskundemuseum Salzburg
- Johannes Hofinger: „Euthanasie“ – Die Ermordung „lebensunwerten Lebens“. Stand der wissenschaftlichen Forschung – Desiderata – Perspektiven. In Thomas Weidenholzer (Hrsg.): Leben im Terror. Verfolgung und Widerstand. Salzburg: Stadtgemeinde Salzburg 2012, pp. 182–223
- Peter Levenda: The Hitler Legacy: The Nazi Cult in Diaspora: How It Was Organized, How It Was Funded …, Ibis, Fort Worth 2014
