= Arthur Johnson Eames =

American botanist (1881–1969)

Arthur Johnson Eames (October 10, 1881 – February 12, 1969) was an American botanist who spent over 50 years as faculty member and emeritus professor of botany at Cornell University, known for his work on flower anatomy and plant morphology. He served as president of the Botanical Society of America in 1938, was a member of the American Academy of Arts and Sciences, and received an honorary LL.D. from the University of Glasgow in 1950.

== Life ==
Eames was born in Framingham, Massachusetts and attended Harvard University, where he received a bachelor's degree in 1908, a master's degree in 1910, and a PhD in 1912. He joined the faculty of Cornell that year. In the 1920s he was the botanist sent to Tonga with William C. McKern and Edward Winslow Gifford who were from the University of California. These three made up one of the four teams of the Bayard Dominick Expedition.

Eames retired in 1949. His works include the textbooks Plant Anatomy (1925); Morphology of Vascular Plants: The Lower Groups (1936); and The Morphology of Angiosperms (1961).

The standard author abbreviation A.J.Eames is used to indicate this person as the author when citing a botanical name.
