= Robert Thomas Aitken =

American anthropologist (1890–1977)

- Born: June 13, 1890; Livermore, California, US
- Died: June 22, 1977 (aged 87); Placerville, California, US
- Other name: R.T. Aitken
- Known for: Ethnology of Tubuai
- Scientific career
- Fields: Ethnology, anthropology, archeology
- Workplaces: Bishop Museum

Robert Thomas Aitken (June 13, 1890 – June 22, 1977) was an American anthropologist known for his work in Oceania while at the Bishop Museum in Hawaiʻi.

== Biography ==
Born in Livermore, California, in 1890, Aitken was raised and educated with his sister and two brothers atop Mt. Hamilton, where his father, Robert Grant Aitken, was an astronomer at the Lick Observatory. He married Gladys Page Baker in 1915, and had two sons, Robert Baker Aitken (Zen Buddhist teacher and author) and Malcolm Darroch Aitken.

His life work included anthropology, ethnology, and archeology. He did graduate work at Columbia University, and started his professional career as an instructor of anthropology at the University of Pennsylvania, and then as anthropologist at the Milwaukee Public Museum. Under the guidance of Franz Boas, Aitken and John Alden Mason excavated Cerro Hueco (Antonio's Cueva), a cave in Puerto Rico, in 1915. While human skeletal remains were unearthed, nothing else of significance was found. Documentation of the work done has, however, provided a basis for the critical analysis of early archeological methodology.

In 1920, he assumed the position of visiting anthropologist at the Bishop Museum in Hawaiʻi. There, he and his assistant Kenneth Emory took passage aboard the interisland steamer Claudine to Maui for an archaeological survey of ruins in the Haleakalā Crater. Later that same year, he left Emory to continue the dig on Maui in order to join the Austral Islands team of the Bayard Dominick Expedition.

On this trip, while collecting data on the Island of Tubuai, he had ongoing health issues. He and nurse/neighbor Tetunohoariiaraiaimoiti Tehahe developed a fond friendship, establishing a robust line in Tahiti through his third child, Tehinaotarehu Teinauri (née Tehahe). Though unbeknownst to his family back home, the secret collapsed shortly after his death some 58 years later, and his two descendant lines celebrated a joyous unification in 1980.

He returned to Hawaiʻi with a serious case of tuberculosis and was confined to Leahi Hospital in Honolulu. The next month, his wife and sons left California to join him in Hawaiʻi. He managed to complete a master's degree at the University of Hawaiʻi in 1923 with his thesis “Mythology of Tubuai.” His magnum opus, the Ethnology of Tubuai, was published in 1930.

His work continued at the Bishop Museum, including roles in leadership, before retiring around 1932. He served in the Army in WWI and WWII, and retired a Major. He spent his active retirement years with wife Gladys in Los Gatos, California.

He died in Placerville, California, in 1977, and shares a grave with family at the National Memorial Cemetery of the Pacific at Puowaina in Honolulu, Hawai’i.
