= Mana (skeleton) =

Neolithic human skeleton discovered in Fiji

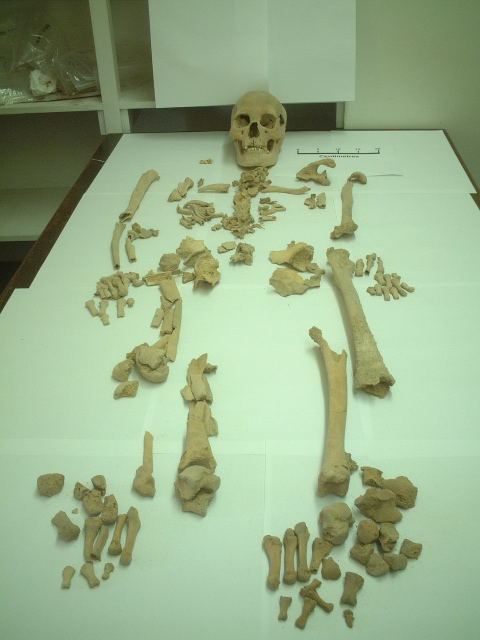
- The skeleton of Mana
- Born: Unknown birth name c. 9th century BCE
- Died: c. 9th century BCE (aged 40-60)
- Body discovered: 2002
- Resting place: Naitabale, Moturiki, Fiji
- Citizenship: Lapita culture
- Height: 161-164 cm
- Children: At least one

Mana is the name given to a complete human skeleton discovered in Moturiki, Fiji, belonging to a Lapita woman that lived in approximately 800 BCE. Being the best preserved Lapita-age skeleton ever found and the oldest skeleton discovered in Fiji, she has been heavily studied, including undergoing forensic facial reconstruction using computer modeling.

== Discovery and naming ==
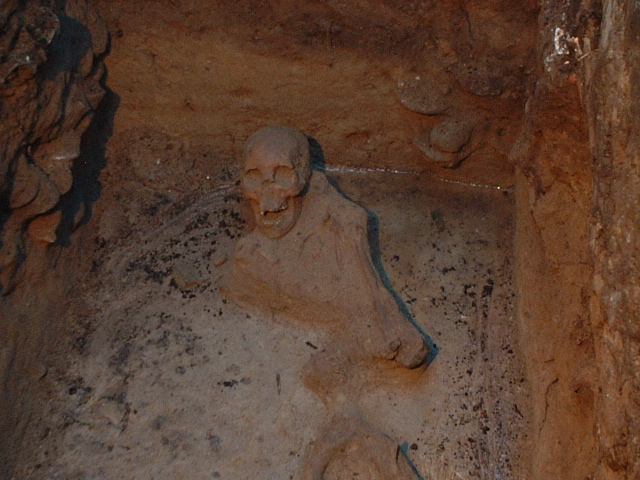
Mana's skeleton inside her grave

Mana was discovered in 2002 in the Naitabale archaeological site on the island of Moturiki in Fiji, by a team of research team from the University of the South Pacific and the Fiji Museum. Naitabale is thought to have been a Lapita settlement in the past. She was buried more than 1.5 metres below the ground surface and she was covered by undisturbed layers of sand and silt sediment that contained Lapita pottery. A large shell of the Rochia nilotica species had been placed under her neck and another one between her knees, with several smaller shells also present within the grave.

The discoverer of the skeleton was Chris Suri, a Solomonese student from the University of the South Pacific and part of the research team. He named the skeleton Mana, which means "the truth" in Lau, his native language.

== Characteristics ==
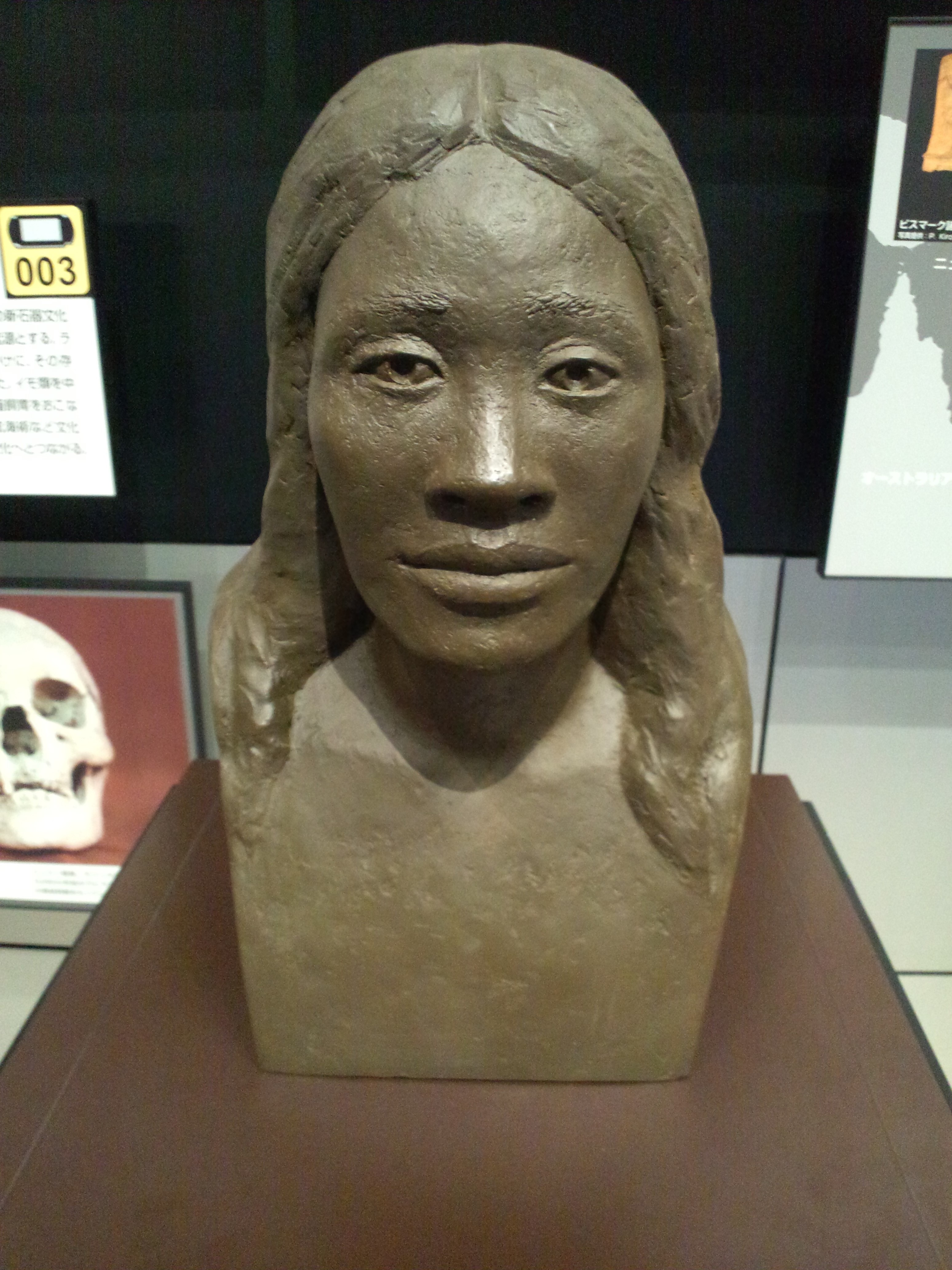
Reconstruction of Mana's face at the National Museum of Ethnology in Japan

Mana's skeleton was transferred to the Kyoto University in Japan to be further studied. She was estimated to have been 161 to 164 centimeters in height and having died between the ages of 40 and 60 years old. Her body was tall, muscular and tough, while she was probably right handed. She was adapted to heavy mastication, and strenuous physical activity involving the neck, arms and feet, similar to other Lapita-age skeletons. She most probably gave birth to at least one child. The roots of her teeth were stained brown, perhaps from chewing roots of kava, a mildly narcotic drug.

While at the Kyoto University she underwent forensic facial reconstruction using computer modeling. Her skull is the only one of a Lapita-era skeleton that has been so well preserved that it was possible to faithfully reconstruct the head. Her facial features had characteristics associated with Polynesian, Fijian and Asian ancestry, however she does not clearly align with any one of these groups.

In order for her age to be determined her bones and some of the shells that were found in her grave were transferred to the Nagoya University in Japan and the University of Waikato in New Zealand. There they underwent radiocarbon dating, with the results estimating that she in lived in 800 BCE or earlier. No DNA could be recovered from her skeleton.

== Repatriation and reburial ==
In December 2003, Mana's skeleton was returned from Japan to Moturiki in Fiji. Upon its return, her remains were placed inside a coffin and she was formally re-buried in the Naitabale archaeological site where she was discovered.
