= Matthew Spriggs =

Australian archaeologist

Matthew Spriggs FAHA
- Occupation: Professor of archaeology

Matthew Spriggs FAHA is an emeritus professor of archaeology at the School of Archaeology and Anthropology of the Australian National University (ANU) in Canberra. He was educated at St John's College, Cambridge. He has made major contributions in the archaeology of Southeast Asia and the Pacific and is particularly well known for his work investigating the Lapita culture cemetery at Teouma in Vanuatu.

Spriggs is of Cornish descent. He is a member of the editorial board of World Archaeology journal.

== Awards and honours ==
Spriggs was elected a Fellow of the Australian Academy of the Humanities in 1998.

He was awarded an Australian Laureate Fellowship in 2014. He received the Rhys Jones Medal, the highest honour awarded by the Australian Archaeological Association, in 2022. He was awarded a research fellowship by the National Library of Australia in 2025.
