= Yanuca Levu =

Island in Fiji

Coordinates: 17°46′S 178°47′E

Geography
- Location: Fiji
- Archipelago: Lomaiviti Islands

Administration
- Fiji
- Division: Eastern Division
- Province: Lomaiviti Province
- District: Ovalau
- Largest settlement: Yanuca

Demographics
- Population: 61 (2017)

Yanuca Levu (Fijian pronunciation: [jaˈnuða ˈleβu]) is a hilly steep islet in Fiji's Lomaiviti group, within Ovalau reef.

There is only on village on the east coast, named Yanuca, with a population of 61, according to the Census of 2017. The local chief is the Turaga na Tunimata, who is also a descendant of the priests of Moturiki.

The island is believed to contain sources of oil and other minerals.
