= Rudolf Pöch =

Austrian doctor and anthropologist (1870–1921)

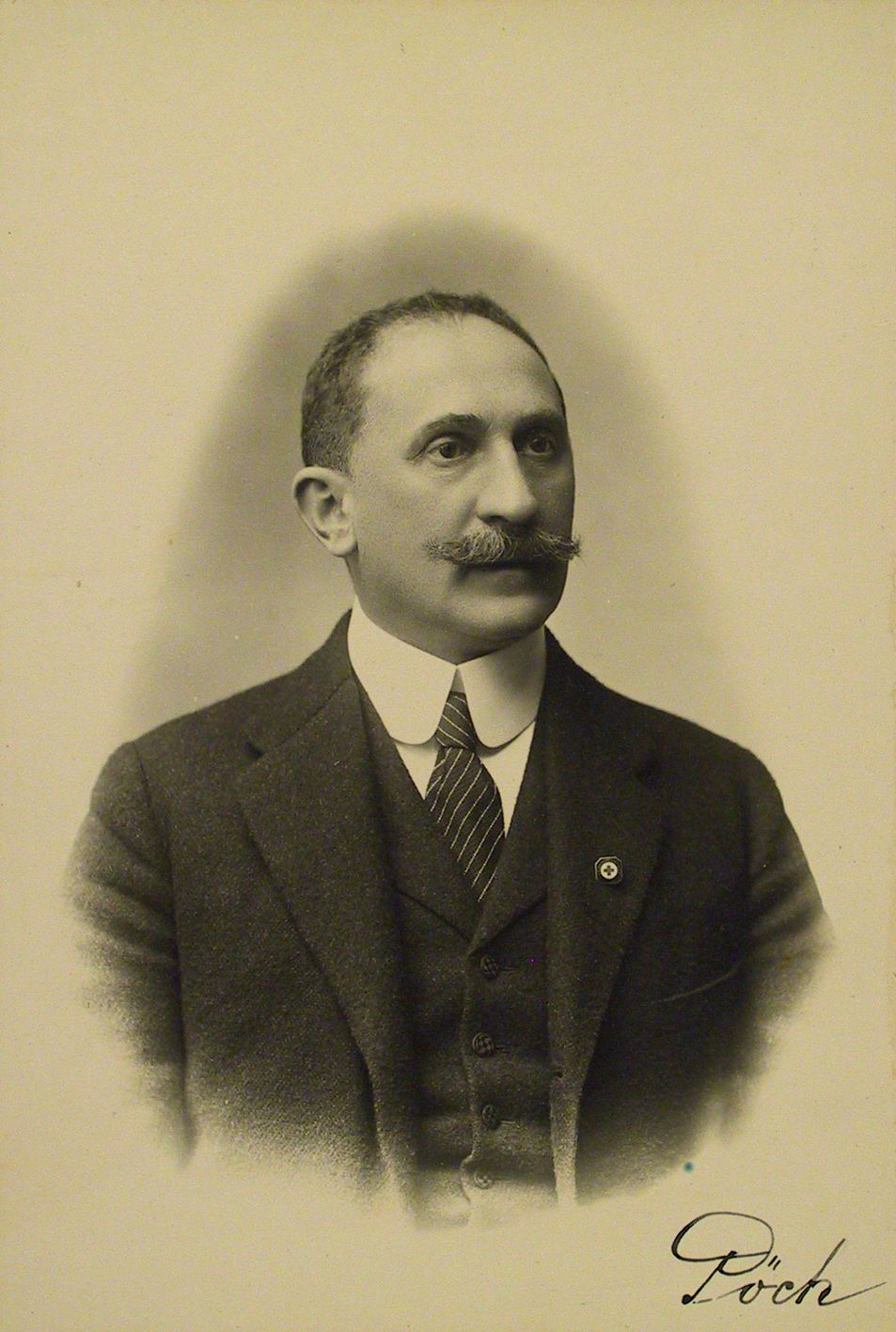
- Born: 17 April 1870; Tarnopol, Austria-Hungary
- Died: 4 March 1921 (aged 50); Innsbruck
- Education: University of Vienna
- Occupations: Medical doctor, photographer, anthropologist, ethnologist
- Known for: Studies of indigenous people in German New Guinea and in South Africa

Rudolf Pöch (17 April 1870, Tarnopol, Kingdom of Galicia and Lodomeria – 4 March 1921, Innsbruck) was an Austrian medical doctor, anthropologist, and ethnologist. Pöch is also known as a pioneer in photography, cinematography, and audio engineering. He can be regarded as a founding father of the Institute for Anthropology and Ethnography at the University of Vienna. His work in anthropology has been labelled as "one of the darkest chapters of anthropology" by Katarina Matiasek. In the 21st century, the extensive collection of human bones and other remains that he brought to Vienna from his various expeditions has been a focal point of efforts towards the repatriation and reburial of human remains.

== Biography ==
Rudolf Pöch studied medicine at the University of Vienna, graduating in 1895. He subsequently worked as assistant medical doctor in Vienna. He also received training in photography from Josef Maria Eder, such that his medical career involved the use of imagery. He was also tasked with photographic documentation of the Plague in Bombay, and when some hospital personnel became infected with the Yersinia pestis bacteria in Vienna in 1898, his intervention helped treat them and prevent a further spread of the illness. He was also involved in the international movement against alcoholism. In 1900-1901, he moved to Berlin and studied ethnology and anthropology under Felix von Luschan.

His work for the Ethnological Museum in Berlin inspired Pöch to undertake an expedition to German New Guinea (1901–1906), where he was the first to find scientific evidence for the existence of pygmies, whom he subjected to extensive measurements and recording procedures. Pöchs technical equipment is especially noteworthy. It included a photo camera, a cine camera and a phonograph, which enabled Pöch to take pictures, video and audio documents of the indigenous population.

Song of the "Ujangong" mask dance
Wax cylinder recording from German New Guinea on 23 August 1904, recorded by Rudolf Pöch.

His 72 recordings of songs, instrumental music and narratives in Papuan languages were seen as a sensation at the time. He also brought home some human remains of dozens of Aborigines.

A second expedition between 1907 and 1909 took Pöch to Southern Africa. He started in what was then German South West Africa, where he arrived in the midst of the German Herero and Nama genocide. He later moved to present-day Botswana and finally to the South African part of the Kalahari Desert, where he studied the San peoples. Again, he undertook extensive measurements of local peoples, as well as photographs, film- and audio recordings. In addition, he collected various ethnographical artefacts such as rock art, samples of local plants and animals, as well as remains of 150 to 170 human skeletons and other body parts, which were transported back to Austria and form part of the Pöch collection.

In 1913, Pöch was appointed as Extraordinary Professor for anthropology and ethnography at the University of Vienna. In 1915, he completed his PhD at the Ludwig-Maximilians-Universität München with a study of skulls of indigenous peoples of New South Wales.

During World War I, Pöch gained notoriety for his so-called "racial-anthropological" studies conducted in prisoner of war camps. He developed a new methodology to capture facial details of his subjects and used this to identify "racial characteristics" of over 7000 prisoners-of-war. His method became a signature approach of the Vienna School of anthropology and was subsequently adopted by others for diverse purposes including fatherhood diagnosis or racial classification.

From 1919, Pöch has been ordinary Professor for Anthropology and Ethnography at the University of Vienna and became a member of the Austrian Academy of Sciences. He died unexpectedly in 1921, aged 51, and was buried in the Vienna Central Cemetery.

== Legacy and critique ==
=== Collections ===
Between 1927 and 1961, the Austrian Academy of Science has published a significant part of his collection, consisting of 14 volumes containing thousands of photographs, reports, drawings, audio documents and correspondence. His technical equipment is currently exhibited at the Naturhistorisches Museum in Vienna. Scientific research and museums continue to benefit from his collections.

=== Theoretical underpinnings ===
Pöch's study of the indigenous people of New Guinea and Southern Africa were motivated by the expectation that these peoples represented a historically less evolved strand of humanity and were doomed to face extinction in the near future. The underpinning belief was that human evolution follows a straight line with, at any given point in time, various stages of evolution visible in different geographies of the planet. These beliefs have since been discredited.

Similarly, his racial anthropological work on prisoners-of-war, which gained him popularity at the time, is now regarded with skepticism due to the problematic context and racist underpinnings. This critical review of Pöch's work has led to a partnership between the Department of Anthropology at the University of Vienna and Armenologist Jasmine Dum-Tragut, towards the repatriation of photographs taken by Pöch of Armenian prisoners of war, to be returned to their communities of origin.

=== Data collection methods and the acquisition of human remains ===
Probably the most controversial aspect of Pöchs legacy relates to how he constituted his collection. Firstly, a fresh review of audio recordings has provided evidence of reluctance and fear of his study subjects, who were most likely coerced to subject themselves to procedures that were unpleasant, if not dehumanising.

The most problematic aspect of his methods relates to his acquisition of human remains. Historians have established that Pöch instructed his assistant Menharto to unbury bodies out of their graves, including bodies of recently deceased persons and boil them to isolate their bones; all of this happened without consultation of surviving family relatives. There are also suspicions of body trafficking involving German farmers in German South West Africa. In South Africa, there is evidence of complaints from family relatives, which led to a police investigation, yet the South African authorities did not intervene to stop Pöch.

Two South African bodies have been treated differently by Menharto, who instead of boiling them, broke the bones at the knee and stored them in a barrel filled with salt. They were Klaas and Trooi Pienaar, and this different treatment made it possible to repatriate these bodies.

=== Restitution and repatriation of human remains ===
As of December 2025, there have been at least three processes of repatriation and reburial of human remains related to Pöch's collection. Between 2009 and 2011, the remains of 47 Aboriginal ancestors were returned to Australia and in 2023, the remains of six further Aboriginal ancestors were being repatriated.

The repatriation of the human remains of South African Klaas and Trooi Pienaar in 2012 was preceded by a ceremony held in Vienna in April 2012. The accompanying official apology by the Government of Austria was accepted by then President Jacob Zuma in August 2012 at the occasion of their reburial in Kuruman.

A large quantity of further human remains from the Pöch collection still need to be repatriated and reburied in years to come. This is a slow process due to the practical difficulties around identification.
