= Teouma =

Archaeological site in Vanuatu

Coordinates: 17.7856°S 168.3862°E

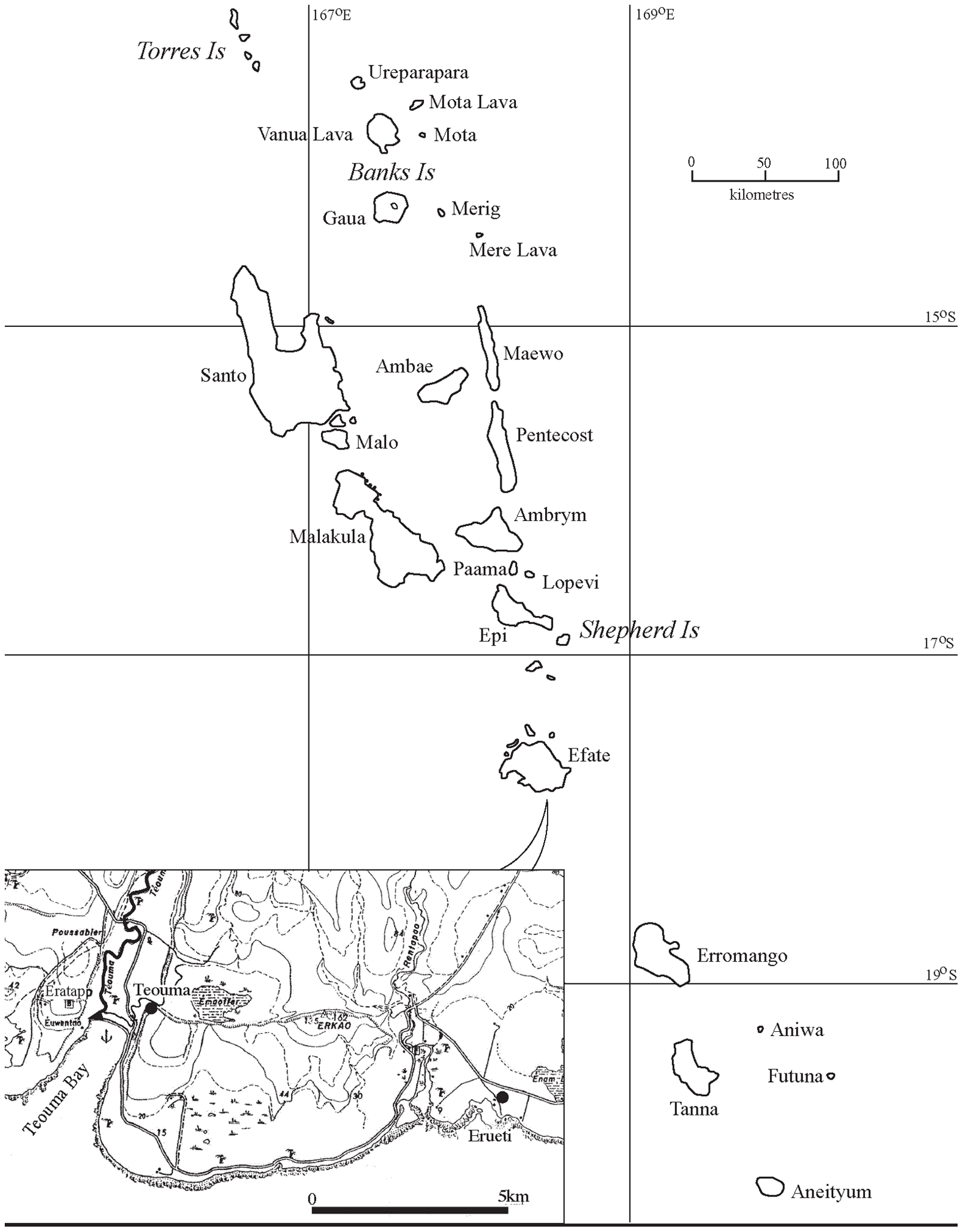
- Location in Vanuatu and on Efate Island

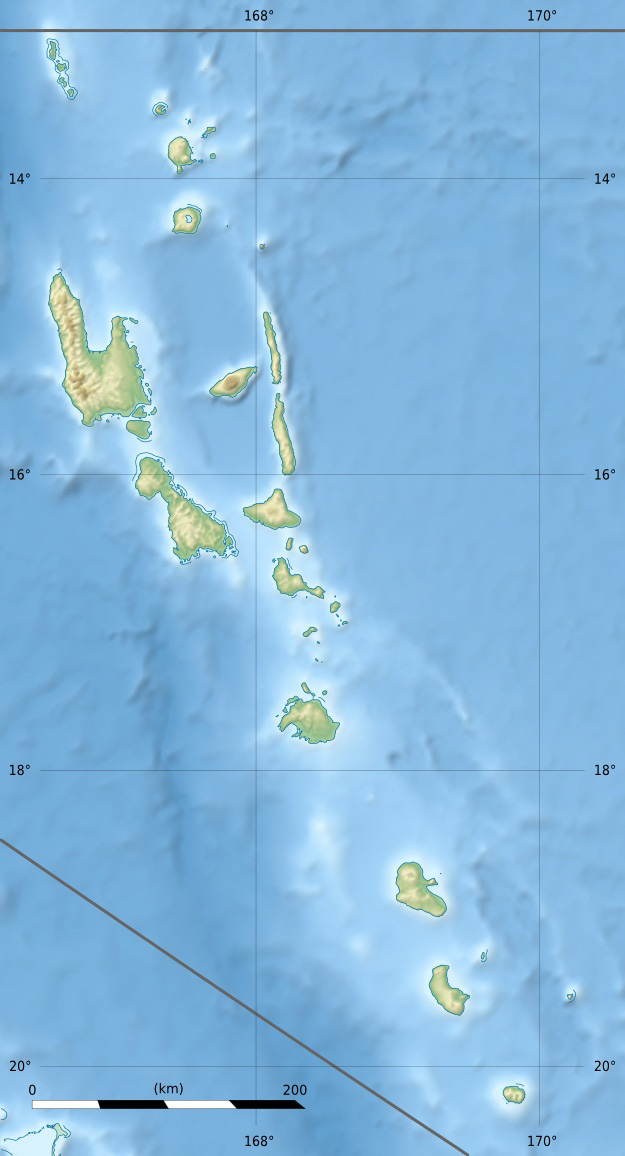
- Location in Vanuatu
- Type: cemetery and midden complex
- Cultures: Lapita culture
- Location: Efate Island, Shefa Province, Vanuatu

Site notes
- Elevation: 8 m (26 ft)
- Area: 10,000 m^{2} (107,639 sq ft)
- Excavation dates: 2004-2010
- Condition: excellent (cemetery complex)

Teouma is a major archaeological site 800 m (2,625 ft) from Teouma Bay on the island of Éfaté in Vanuatu. The site contains the oldest known cemetery within the Pacific Islands, and has been important in the gathering of information relating to the Lapita people of the ninth and tenth centuries BC.

== Archaeology ==
In late 2003, 26 inhumations consisting of 36 individuals were found in the largest-known cemetery located on the south coast of Éfaté Island in Vanuatu in the Pacific. The cemetery is thought to be between approximately 3200 and 3000 years old. A common feature of these burials is the presence of red pottery fragments bearing intricate designs. These individuals were buried in various positions. One consistent feature of the burials was the removal of the skull, following the decomposition of the periodontal ligaments. Once removed, these skulls were replaced with cone shell rings. This demonstrates a ceremonial culture.

== Isotopic analysis ==
Isotope analysis was performed on the excavated individuals to determine the characteristics of human migration in the Pacific during this time period. Researchers were able to analyze isotopes from 17 of the individuals. Subsequently, they found that four individuals had different isotope levels from the remaining 13. It is believed that these four individuals were immigrants, and in addition to having different isotope levels, they may have been different culturally as well.

== Genetics ==
In 2016, researchers extracted the DNA from the petrous bone of three of the individuals buried at Teouma. This is the first successful DNA extraction from ancient samples taken from the tropics. The remains date to around 3,110 to 2,710 years old.

DNA analysis confirmed that all three of the individuals were female. They all belong to Haplogroup B4a1a1a, the typical 'Polynesian motif'.

aDNA analysis shows that the three individuals cluster together with another Lapita sample, dating to around 2,680 to 2,340 years old, taken from Talasiu, Tongatapu, Tonga; all together, the samples form a genetically distinct population when compared against modern populations.

When compared against modern populations, the ancient samples from Teouma and Talasiu are genetically closest to the Ami and Atayal people from Taiwan, and the Kankanaey people from the northern Philippines, while sharing little similarity with modern Papuans. According to Matthew Spriggs, the ancient population at Teouma came "straight out of Taiwan and perhaps the northern Philippines".

== See also ==
- Austronesian peoples

== Bibliography ==
- Bedford, Stuart et al. 2006. "The Teouma Lapita site and the early human settlement of the Pacific Islands"
- Bedford, Stuart et al. 2007. "The excavation, conservation and reconstruction of Lapita burial pots from the Teouma site, Efate, Central Vanuatu." (pdf)
- Hayes, Susan et al. 2009. "Faces of the Teouma Lapita People: Art, Accuracy and Facial Approximation." Leonardo, Vol. 42, No.3. pp. 284–285.
