= Bayard Dominick expedition =

1920 scientific expedition to the Pacific islands of Polynesia

The Bayard Dominick expedition was a 1920 scientific expedition to the Pacific islands of Polynesia, with four teams sent to compile archaeological and anthropological surveys of the Marquesas, Tonga, Austral Islands, and Hawaiʻi.

The expedition's first year was financed by Bayard Dominick who was a member of the New York Stock Exchange. He gave a gift to Yale University of $40,000 and this was sent on to the Hawaiian museum. The Tonga team was Edward W. Gifford and William C. McKern both from the University of California and the botanist was Arthur J. Eames from Harvard University. The Marquesas team was Edward S. C. Handy from Harvard and Ralph Linton from the University of Pennsylvania accompanied by the Yale botanist Forest B. H. Brown, and Mrs. Brown and Mrs. Handy as volunteer assistants. The Austral Islands team was John F. G. Stokes (Bishop Museum staff), Robert Thomas Aitken (Columbia University) and volunteer assistant Mrs J. F. G. Stokes. Finally the Hawaiian team was Louis R. Sullivan from Brown University and Kenneth P. Emory from Dartmouth, Harvard.
