= Moturiki =

Island in Fiji

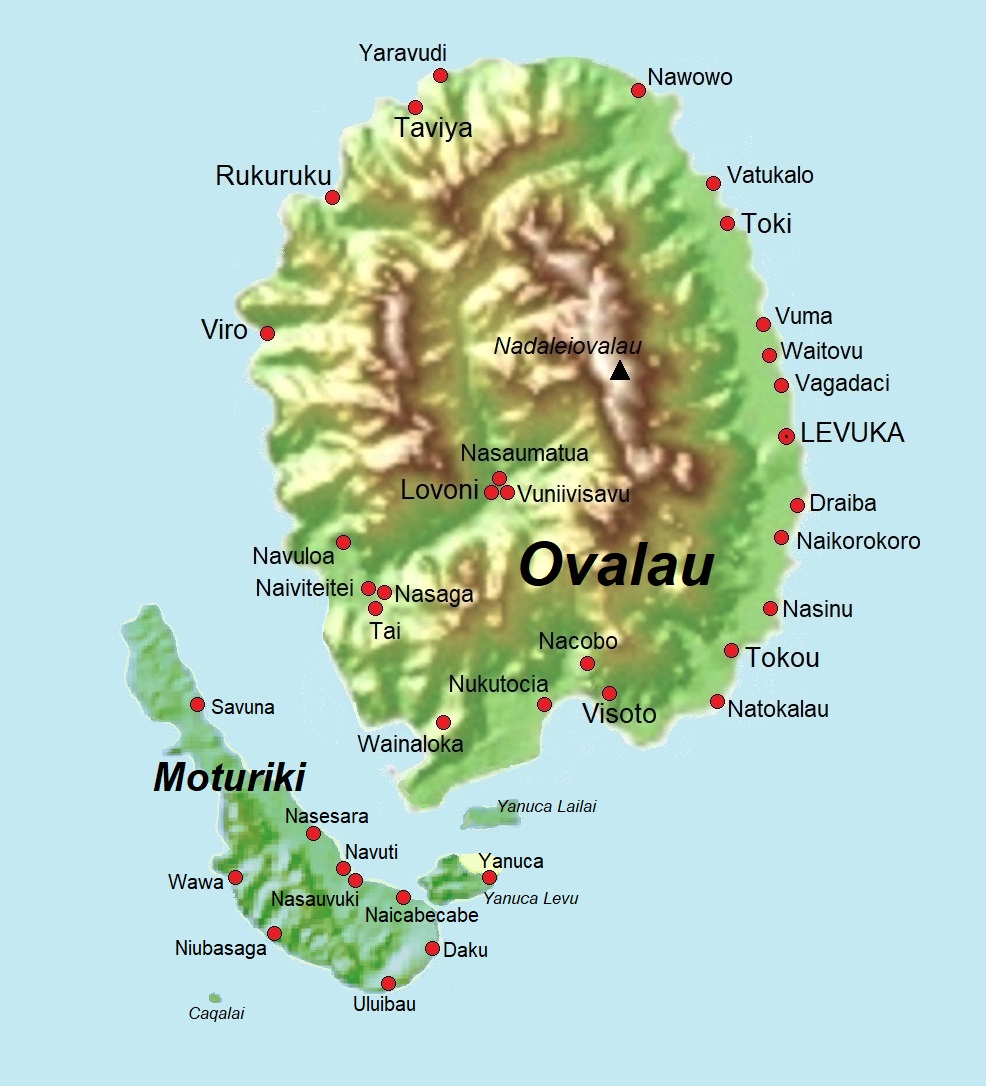
- Ovalau Island, with Moturiki off the southwest coast

- Location within Fiji

Geography
- Location: Fiji
- Coordinates: 17°45′S 178°45′E
- Archipelago: Lomaiviti Islands
- Area: 10.9 km^{2} (4.2 sq mi)

Administration
- Fiji
- Division: Eastern Division
- Province: Lomaiviti Province
- District: Ovalau

Demographics
- Population: c. 704 (2007)

Moturiki is an island belonging to Fiji's Lomaiviti Archipelago. Covering an area of 10.9 square kilometers, it is situated at 17.45° South and 178.44° East. To the north-east is the nearby island of Ovalau.

== Etymology ==
An etymology for the name of the island, proposed by Ratu Viliame, is that it is a combination of the Proto-Polynesian words *motu (which means island) and *riki (which means small).

== Settlements and living conditions ==
The island is inhabited by 654 Fijians living in nine villages along the coast: Daku (48), Naicabecabe (81), Nasauvuki (114), Nasesara (107), Navuti (128), Niubasaga (33), Savuna (21), Uluibau (159), and Wawa (13).

The village of Yanuca (61) is part of the Moturiki tikina, it is located on the neighboring island of Yanuca. Population figures are from the 2017 census.

The villages on Moturiki have faced on-going disease outbreaks, including typhoid fever, primarily due to the lack of safe drinking water. At points, this has required the large-scale delivery of clean water by boat and then manually distributed by vehicles and carts.

There are two primary schools: The Moturiki District School in Nasauvuki Village, and the Uluibau Primary School.

== Archaeology ==
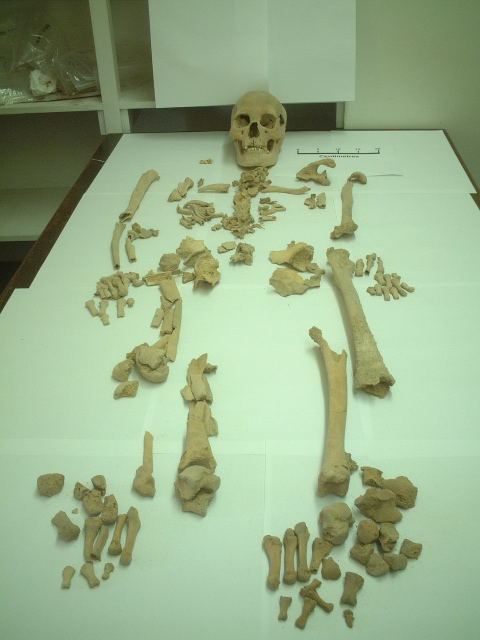
The skeleton of Mana

Moturiki is of great archaeological interest. Important discoveries include the earliest Lapita culture sites of Fiji, as well as the oldest human skeleton found in Fiji (dating about 700 BC). The skeleton is named Mana, which belonged to a woman who was approximately 40–60 years old and 161–164 cm tall. The skeleton was excavated on the Lapita Culture Complex site called Naitabale. The Lapita occupation of Naitabale likely began by 900 BC.
