= Edward Winslow Gifford =

American anthropologist and ethnographer

- Born: August 14, 1887; Oakland, California, U.S.
- Died: May 16, 1959 (aged 71); Paradise, California, U.S.
- Scientific career
- Fields: ethnography

Edward Winslow Gifford (August 14, 1887 – May 16, 1959) was an American anthropologist who devoted his life to studying California Indian ethnography as a professor of anthropology and director of the Museum of Anthropology at the University of California, Berkeley.

Gifford was born in Oakland, California. After graduating high school, he became an assistant curator of ornithology at the California Academy of Sciences. He never attended college. He joined the University of California's Museum of Anthropology in 1912 as an assistant curator. In the 1920s he was sent to Tonga with William C. McKern who was also from the University of California. With the botanist Arthur J. Eames from Harvard University they made up one of the four teams of the Bayard Dominick Expedition.

Gifford became a curator in 1925 and a professor in 1945. Working closely with the preeminent leader in California anthropology, Alfred L. Kroeber, Gifford authored more than 100 publications, notably about salvage ethnography, recording state's native cultures. He developed the museum into a major U.S. institution with its major field research and collections. Gifford maintained long-term positive relationships with many Berkeley graduate students, often writing them with advice and ideas while they were engaged in fieldwork.
