= 1914 Fijian general election =

General elections were held in Fiji between 19 May and 20 June 1914.

== Electoral system ==
The Legislative Council included seven elected Europeans who were elected from six constituencies created as a result of amendments to the constitution made on 31 January 1914, which increased the number of elected Europeans from six to seven and the number of constituencies from five to six. The new constituencies were Eastern, Northern, Southern, Suva, Vanua Levu & Taveuni and Western.

Constituency	Geographical area	Election date
Eastern	Lau Province, Lomaiviti Province, Levuka municipality	19 May
Northern	Ba District, Colo North Province, Ra Province	19 June
Southern	Colo East Province, Kadavu Province, Naitasiri Province, Namosi Province, Rewa Province (except Levuka), Serua Province, Tailevu Province	19 May
Suva	Suva Municipality	20 June
Vanua Levu and Taveuni	Bua Province, Cakaudrove Province, Macuata Province	19 June
Western	Colo West Province, Lautoka District, Nadi District, Nadroga Province	19 June

== Results ==
Constituency	Candidate	Votes	%	Notes
Eastern	John Maynard Hedstrom	Unopposed		Re-elected
Northern	Henry Lamb Kennedy	53	58.2	Elected
Northern	L. Davidson	38	41.8	
Southern	Robert Crompton	Unopposed		Elected
Suva	Henry Milne Scott	221	41.9	Re-elected
Suva	Henry Marks	210	39.8	Re-elected
Suva	C.A. Brough	96	18.2	
Vanua Levu & Taveuni	Edward Duncan	99	79.2	Elected
Vanua Levu & Taveuni	James McConnell	26	20.8	
Western	Charles Wimbledon Thomas	89	66.4	Re-elected
Western	J.C. Doyle	45	33.6	
Source: Ali

=== Appointed members ===
Position	Member
Governor (President)	Ernest Bickham Sweet-Escott
Agent-General of Immigration	Sydney Frederick Smith
Attorney General	Alfred Karney Young
Chief Medical Officer	George Lynch
Colonial Postmaster	Herbert Paul St. Julian
Colonial Secretary	Eyre Hutson
Commissioner of Lands	Dyson Blair
Commissioner of Works	William Akerman Miller
Inspector General of Constabulary	Islay McOwan
Native Commissioner	Kenneth Allardyce
Receiver General	Richard Sims Donkin Rankine
Superintendent of Agriculture	Charles Henry Knowles
Fijian member	Joni Madraiwiwi I
Fijian member	Joni Antonio Rabici
Source: Fiji Blue Book

== Aftermath ==
Further changes were made to the constitution in 1916, increasing the number of nominated members from 10 to 12; eleven were civil servants and the other had to be a British subject not holding public office. Badri Maharaj was chosen as the twelfth nominated member, becoming the first Indo-Fijian member of the Legislative Council.
