= 1917 Fijian general election =

General elections were held in Fiji in June and July 1917.

== Electoral system ==
Changes were made to the constitution on 20 July 1916, increasing the number of nominated members in the Legislative Council from 10 to 12; eleven were civil servants and the other had to be a British subject not holding public office. The number of elected Europeans remained at seven and the number of appointed Fijians at two. The Governor served as President of the Council.

The Europeans were elected from six constituencies; Eastern, Northern, Southern, Suva, Vanua Levu & Taveuni and Western. Voting was restricted to men aged 21 or over who had been born to European parents (or a European father and was able to read, speak and write English) who were British subjects and had been continuously resident in Fiji for 12 months, either owning at least £20 of freehold or leasehold property or having an annual income of at least £120, and were not on the public payroll.

Constituency	Geographical area	Election date
Eastern	Lau Province, Lomaiviti Province	22 June
Northern	Ba District, Colo North Province, Ra Province	21 July
Southern	Colo East Province, Kadavu Province, Naitasiri Province, Namosi Province, Rewa Province (except Suva), Serua Province, Tailevu Province	23 June
Suva	Suva Municipality	21 July
Vanua Levu and Taveuni	Bua Province, Cakaudrove Province, Macuata Province	
Western	Colo West Province, Lautoka District, Nadi District, Nadroga Province	20 July

== Results ==
Constituency	Candidate	Votes	%	Notes
Eastern	John Maynard Hedstrom	Unopposed		Re-elected
Northern	Frederick Clapcott	67	69.1	Elected
Northern	Henry Lamb Kennedy	30	30.9	Unseated
Northern	Informal votes	3	–	
Southern	Robert Crompton	Unopposed		Re-elected
Suva	Henry Marks	187	38.2	Re-elected
Suva	Henry Milne Scott	179	36.6	Re-elected
Suva	Francis Reimenschneider	123	25.2	
Suva	Informal votes	2	–	
Vanua Levu & Taveuni	Joseph MacKay	78	51.0	Elected
Vanua Levu & Taveuni	T.A. Montgomery	70	45.8	
Vanua Levu & Taveuni	James McConnell	5	3.3	
Vanua Levu & Taveuni	Informal votes	3	–	
Western	Reginald Harricks	66	71.0	Elected
Western	Charles Wimbledon Thomas	27	29.0	Unseated
Western	Informal votes	1	–	
Source: Ali

=== Appointed members ===
The nominated members were appointed on 3 August.

Position	Member
Governor (President)	Ernest Bickham Sweet-Escott
Agent-General of Immigration	Robert Malcolm Booth
Attorney General	Alfred Karney Young
Chief Medical Officer	George Lynch
Colonial Postmaster	Herbert Paul St. Julian
Colonial Secretary	Eyre Hutson
Commissioner of Lands	Dyson Blair
Commissioner of Works	William Akerman Miller
Receiver General	Richard Sims Donkin Rankine
Registrar-General	Roger Green
Secretary for Native Affairs	Kenneth Allardyce
Superintendent of Agriculture	Charles Henry Knowles
Representing Indo-Fijians	Badri Maharaj
Fijian member	Joni Madraiwiwi I
Fijian member	Joni Antonio Rabici
Source: Fiji Blue Book

== Aftermath ==
The results of the Vanua Levu and Taveuni seat were later annulled by the Supreme Court. As a result, a by-election was held in November 1917 which Joseph MacKay was again elected, receiving 84 votes to the 50 of J. Harper received 50 votes and three for James McConnell. However, MacKay died on 6 December. John Francis Dyer was subsequently elected in the constituency in another by-election in 1919.
