= 1920 Fijian general election =

General elections were held in Fiji in July, August and September 1920.

== Electoral system ==
The Legislative Council consisted of 12 official members (eleven civil servants and a British subject not holding public office), seven elected Europeans and two appointed Fijians. The Governor served as President of the Council.

The Europeans were elected from six constituencies; Eastern, Northern, Southern, Suva, Vanua Levu & Taveuni and Western. Voting was restricted to men aged 21 or over who had been born to European parents (or a European father and was able to read, speak and write English) who were British subjects and had been continuously resident in Fiji for 12 months, either owning at least £20 of freehold or leasehold property or having an annual income of at least £120, and were not on the public payroll.

Constituency	Geographical area	Election date
Eastern	Lau Province, Lomaiviti Province	30 July
Northern	Ba District, Colo North Province, Ra Province	6 September
Southern	Colo East Province, Kadavu Province, Naitasiri Province, Namosi Province, Rewa Province (except Suva), Serua Province, Tailevu Province	2 September
Suva	Suva Municipality	21 August
Vanua Levu and Taveuni	Bua Province, Cakaudrove Province, Macuata Province	2 September
Western	Colo West Province, Lautoka District, Nadi District, Nadroga Province	3 September

== Results ==
Constituency	Candidate	Votes	%	Notes
Eastern	John Maynard Hedstrom	Unopposed		Re-elected
Northern	Frederick Clapcott	60	58.3	Re-elected
Northern	L. Davidson	42	40.8	
Northern	N.S. Chalmers	1	1.0	
Southern	Francis Riemenschneider	80	55.9	Elected
Southern	Robert Crompton	63	44.1	Unseated
Southern	Informal votes	1	–	
Suva	Henry Milne Scott	242	36.3	Re-elected
Suva	Henry Marks	194	29.1	Re-elected
Suva	S.H. Ellis	123	18.5	
Suva	James Burton Turner	107	16.1	
Vanua Levu & Taveuni	Herbert Valentine Tarte	62	45.9	Elected
Vanua Levu & Taveuni	W.C. Fisher	38	28.1	
Vanua Levu & Taveuni	E. Duncan	35	25.9	
Vanua Levu & Taveuni	Informal votes	3	–	
Western	Charles Wimbledon Thomas	63	56.3	Elected
Western	John Percy Bayly	49	43.8	
Western	Informal votes	4	–	
Source: Ali

=== Appointed members ===
The nominated members were appointed on 15 October; one of the Fijian posts was left unfilled.

Position	Member
Governor (President)	Cecil Hunter-Rodwell
Agent-General of Immigration	Percy Robert Backhouse
Attorney General	Alfred Karney Young
Chief Medical Officer	George Cecil Strathairn
Colonial Postmaster	Herbert Paul St. Julian
Colonial Secretary	Thomas Edward Fell
Commissioner of Lands	Dyson Blair
Commissioner of Works	Henry Berry Lees
District Commissioner, Rewa	Richard Rutledge Kane
Receiver General	William Henry Brabant
Secretary for Native Affairs	Douglas Ray Stewart
Superintendent of Agriculture	Charles Henry Knowles
Representing Indo-Fijians	Badri Maharaj
Fijian member	Joni Antonio Rabici
Source: Fiji Blue Book

== Aftermath ==
A by-election was held for the Vanua Levu and Taveuni seat on 4 October 1922, which was won by William Edmund Willoughby-Tottenham.
