= George Lynch =

George Lynch may refer to:

- George Lynch (journalist) (1868–1928) Irish journalist, author, explorer, war correspondent and inventor
- George Lynch-Staunton (1858–1940), Canadian politician
- George Lynch (Chief Medical Officer) (1861–1940), British physician and Chief Medical Officer in Fiji between 1908 and 1919
- George Edward Lynch (1917–2003), American bishop
- George Lynch (racing driver) (1918–1997), American Indianapolis 500 competitor
- George Lynch (musician) (born 1954), American member of the heavy metal band Dokken
- George Lynch (basketball) (born 1970), American NCAA champion and NBA player

== See also ==
- Lynch (surname)
