= 1926 Fijian general election =

General elections were held in Fiji in 1926.

== Electoral system ==
The Legislative Council consisted of 12 official members (eleven civil servants and a British subject not holding public office), seven elected Europeans and two appointed Fijians. The Governor served as President of the Council.

The Europeans were elected from six constituencies; Eastern, Northern, Southern, Suva, Vanua Levu & Taveuni and Western. Voting was restricted to men aged 21 or over who had been born to European parents (or a European father and was able to read, speak and write English) who were British subjects and had been continuously resident in Fiji for 12 months, owning at least £20 of freehold or leasehold property or having an annual income of at least £120, and were not on the public payroll.

Constituency	Geographical area
Eastern	Lau Province, Lomaiviti Province
Northern	Ba District, Colo North Province, Ra Province
Southern	Colo East Province, Kadavu Province, Naitasiri Province, Namosi Province, Rewa Province (except Suva), Serua Province, Tailevu Province
Suva	Suva Municipality
Vanua Levu and Taveuni	Bua Province, Cakaudrove Province, Macuata Province
Western	Colo West Province, Lautoka District, Nadi District, Nadroga Province

== Results ==
Constituency	Candidate	Votes	%	Notes
Eastern	John Maynard Hedstrom	73	86.9	Re-elected
Eastern	C. de Mouncey	11	13.1	
Eastern	Informal votes	1	–	
Northern	Hugh Ragg	76	63.9	Elected
Northern	Henry Lamb Kennedy	43	36.1	Unseated
Northern	Informal votes	2	–	
Southern	Alport Barker	Unopposed		Re-elected
Suva	Henry Marks	Unopposed		Re-elected
Suva	Henry Milne Scott	Unopposed		Re-elected
Vanua Levu & Taveuni	William Edmund Willoughby-Tottenham	129	70.5	Elected
Vanua Levu & Taveuni	G. Garrick	54	29.5	
Vanua Levu & Taveuni	Informal votes	8	–	
Western	Percival William Faddy	104	55.6	Re-elected
Western	Charles Wimbledon Thomas	83	44.4	
Western	Informal votes	7	–	
Source: Ali

== Aftermath ==
Badri Maharaj was nominated as the member representing Indo-Fijians.

Joni Mataitini and Deve Toganivalu were appointed as the Fijian members, despite Toganivalu having finished third behind Epeli Ganilau in the voting by the Great Council of Chiefs.
