= 1871 Fijian House of Delegates election =

Elections to the House of Delegates were held in Fiji in the summer of 1871.

== Background ==
After being crowned King of Fiji on 5 June 1871, Seru Epenisa Cakobau called for the election of members of the House of Delegates to scrutinise the proposed constitution.

== Results ==
A total of 30 European members were elected, representing most areas with European settlement. The elected members sat alongside 30 chiefs.

=== Elected members ===
Settlement	Elected members
Ba	J. Berry, H. Kennedy
Bua	R.L. Holmes
Dreketi	R.J.W. Cave
Koro	R. Galloway
Levuka	A. Levy, J.A. Manton, J.R. Ryley
Lomaloma	H. Emberson, W. Hennings, (Note: Replaced by H. Levick in early August.) R.S. Swanston
Lower Rewa	Newmarsh
Macuata	James Stewart Butters
Nadroga	Robert Wilson Hamilton
Navua	Brown
Ovalau	Bateman
Ra	W.R. Scott
Savu Savu	A.D. Lang, H.B. Smith
Suva	C.A. Egerstrom
Tova and Nananu	Andrews
Upper Rewa	H. Eastgate, J.M. Haslett, G. Hennings
Source: Routledge

== Aftermath ==
The newly elected House was opened by Cakobau on 1 August. After amendments were made to the constitution, including the creation of a Privy Council and the creation of a Legislative Assembly consisting solely of Europeans, the document was signed by Cakobau on 18 August. Writs were subsequently issued for elections to the Legislative Assembly, which were held by the start of October.
