= 1929 Fijian general election =

General elections were held in Fiji in 1929. They were the first in which Indo-Fijians were allowed to vote.

== Background ==
Indo-Fijians had previously been able to vote in municipal elections, but when elections to the Legislative Council were introduced in 1905, the Governor noted that he "did not consider it necessary to provide for the representation of the Indians and Pacific Islanders because they had shown themselves open to corruption at the municipal elections." Subsequently, the community lost its right to vote in local elections in 1912. In 1916 provision was made for an Indo-Fijian member of the Legislative Council, but they were appointed by the Governor rather than elected.

== Electoral system ==
Constitutional amendments made on 1 May 1929 changed the composition of the Legislative Council. The number of appointed members was increased from 12 to 13, with all 13 now required to be civil servants (previously one of the appointed members had been from outside the civil service). The number of elected members was increased from seven to nine, with the number of European elected members reduced from seven to six (elected from five constituencies, reduced from six with the removal of Suva), and three elected seats created for Indo-Fijians. The number of appointed Fijian members was increased from two to three; they were appointed from a list of between four and six potential candidates presented to the Governor by the Great Council of Chiefs. The Governor also sat in the Council as its President.

Voter eligibility remained unchanged for Europeans, being restricted to men aged 21 or over who had been born to European parents (or a European father and was able to read, speak and write English), who were British subjects and had been continuously resident in Fiji for 12 months, and who either owned at least £20 of freehold or leasehold property or had an annual income of at least £120.

For Indo-Fijians, eligibility was also restricted to men aged 21 or over. They had to be a British subject or from British India, have lived continuously in the Fiji for at least two years, be able to read or write in English, Gujarati, Gurmukhi, Hindi, Tamil, Telugu or Urdu, and for the previous six months, have either owned property with an annual value of five years, had a net annual cash income of at least £75, or held a Government or municipal licence worth at least £5 annually.

In both ethnic categories, civil servants were barred from voting.

== Results ==
Three sitting members of the Council contested the two seats in the redrawn Southern constituency; Alport Barker who had represented the old Southern constituency, and Henry Milne Scott and Henry Marks, who been the two members for Suva since 1911 (Milne Scott was first elected in 1908). Marks was unseated after 18 years on the Council, finishing 125 votes behind Barker.

Constituency	Candidate	Votes	%	Notes
European members
Eastern	John Maynard Hedstrom	Unopposed		Re-elected
Northern	Hugh Ragg	Unopposed		Elected
Southern	Henry Milne Scott	471	38.5	Re-elected
Southern	Alport Barker	438	35.8	Re-elected
Southern	Henry Marks	313	25.6	Unseated
Southern	Informal votes	7	–	
Vanua Levu & Taveuni	William Edmund Willoughby-Tottenham	120	88.9	Re-elected
Vanua Levu & Taveuni	E. Hathaway	15	11.1	
Vanua Levu & Taveuni	Informal votes	32	–	
Western	John Percy Bayly	59	32.4	Elected
Western	Charles Wimbledon Thomas	50	27.5	
Western	P. Costello	49	26.9	
Western	Percival William Faddy	24	13.2	Unseated
Western	Informal votes	7	–	
Indo-Fijian members
Eastern	James Ramchandar Rao	63	75.9	Elected
Eastern	Khalil Sahim	20	24.1	
Eastern	Informal votes	5	–	
Northern and Western	Parmanand Singh	309	58.2	Elected
Northern and Western	Champadan Manakandan Gopalan	222	41.8	
Northern and Western	Informal votes	57	–	
Southern	Vishnu Deo	419	72.1	Elected
Southern	John F. Grant	162	27.9	
Southern	Informal	13	–	
Source: Ali

== Aftermath ==
Popi Seniloli and Deve Toganivalu were appointed as Fijian members.

After the Legislative Council was opened, Deo put forward a resolution for a common electoral roll on 5 November 1929. After it was defeated, the three Indo-Fijian members walked out of the Council. After missing three sittings, they were deemed to have forfeited their seats and by-elections were called. However, no nominations were received. As a result, the Indo-Fijian seats were left vacant until 1932.
