= 1870 Fijian general election =

Abortive elections to a Corporation of European settlers were held in Fiji in 1870.

== Background ==
The European settlers in Fiji had been seeking to form some kind of government for several years. A leaflet was distributed at a meeting in Levuka on 14 April 1870 proposing the creation of a governing committee. A committee was subsequently set up to produce a constitution, which was published in May 1870. It proposed a Corporation in which each district would be represented by a number of delegates proportion to its European population. Its first meeting was to be held on 16 June.

== Results ==
District	Elected members
Lau	W. Hennings
Ovalau	Cudlip, F.W. Hennings, Niemann, Turner
Rewa	Bentley, Chalmers, Eastgate, Waterstone
Suva	Sellers
Source: Routledge

== Aftermath ==
As no representatives had been elected from the Northern Viti Levu, Taveuni, Vanua Levu or Western Viti Levu, the elected members of the Corporation stated that felt they could not make decisions on any matter that would affect the entire European community. Some delegates stated that they were uncertain of what powers they had and that not enough time had been provided to enrol voters.

In August, it was reported in the Fiji Times that the Corporation had been disbanded due to lack of support.
