= Lovoni =

- Tikina
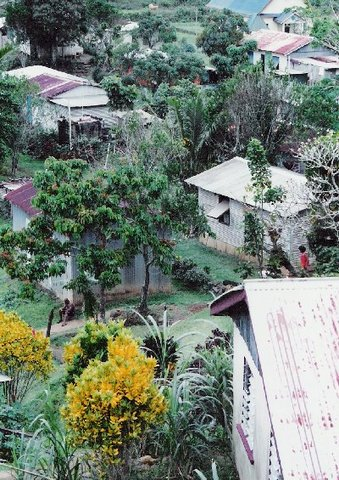
- Lovoni Village, Ovalau, Fiji

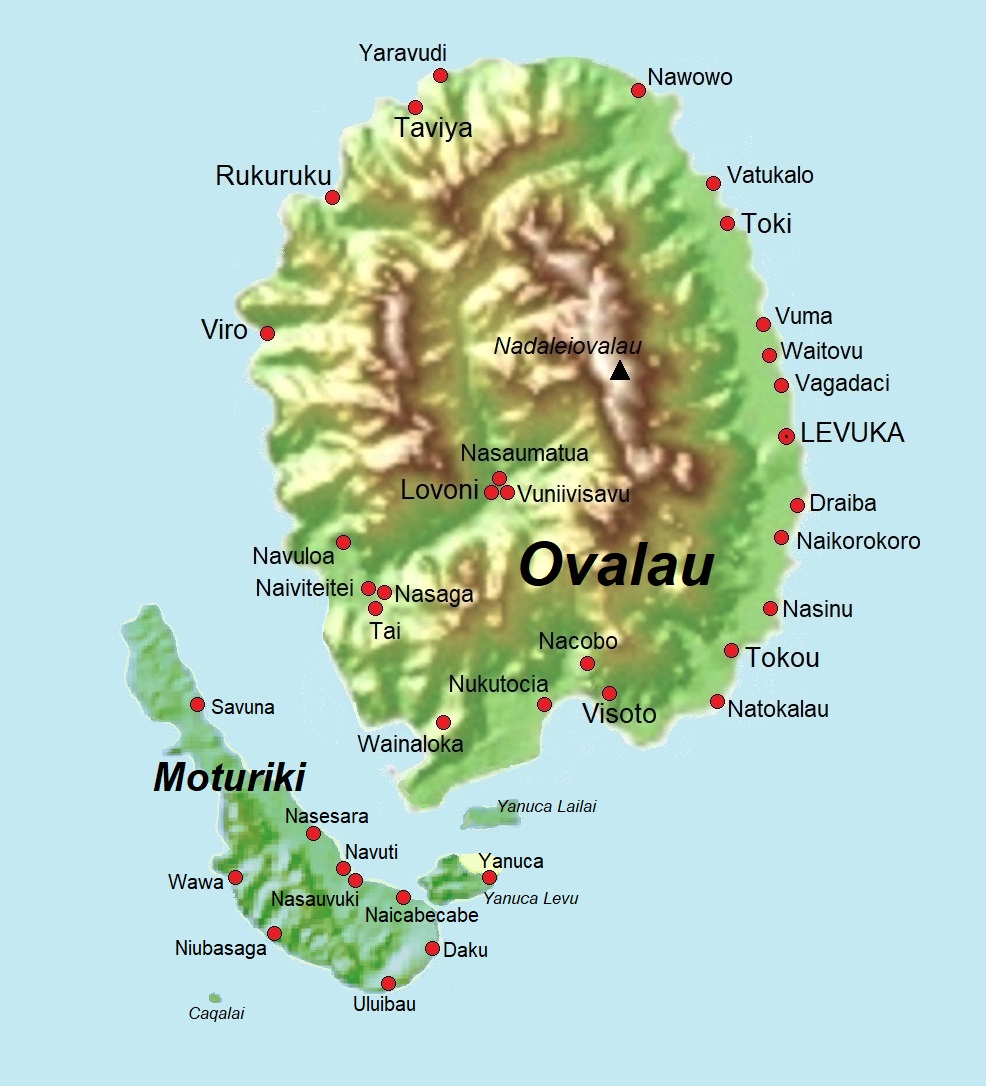
- Ovalau with Lovoni in the island's centre

- Location in Fiji
- Country: Fiji
- Island: Ovalau
- Division: Eastern Division
- Province: Lomaiviti
- Time zone: UTC+12

The Tikina of Lovoni is made up of the Fijian villages of Lovoni, Nasaumatua, Vuni-ivi-savu, Visoto, Nukutocia and Nacobo. The latter three villages are located on the coast of Ovalau. The paramount Chief of the Tikina of Lovoni which includes six villages is the Tui Wailevu the Vunivalu. The Lovoni Village Road is used by the inhabitants to access the nearby town of Levuka.

Pacific boas can be found near the villages and are considered as delicacies.

== History ==
Various myths and legends attribute the Lovoni people to different origins. It is believed that they were the first settlers of the island having migrated from mainland Vitilevu to settle Ovalau. Popular beliefs link them to the High Chiefdom of Verata and inevitably to the Nakauvadra epic. The founding ancestor of the Lovoni is popularly referred to as Rakavono, nephew to the mythical founder of the Bureta people, Bui Savulu, daughter of Lutunasobasoba.

At the time of European contact, written sources refer to this group of people as the predominant rulers of Ovalau. They were responsible for torching the settlement of Levuka, at least twice, causing a dispersal of its early European settlers to Savusavu. They were an independent Fijian Kingdom with kinship ties to the Roko Tui Bau, the people of Verata, Wainibuka and Naitasiri. Their allies within the Lomaiviti group lay with the Tora ni Bau of Batiki. They also had strong ties with the people of Bua and Cakaudrove. To the east, they had extensive ties and allies with the Yasayasa Moala and Ono-i-Lau. Their ties to the west of Fiji were direct kinship ties with the noblehouse of the Tui Nadi.

The Lovoni people, being an independent kingdom with several strategic tributaries, ensured their role as mercenaries of war in the central Fijian province of Lomaiviti, which at the time of European contact, was undergoing a major power struggle between the Noble Houses of Verata and their ally and kin the House of the Roko Tui Bau and the rising power of the Vunivalu of Bau. This period also saw the growing power of the Tongans influx to the east of Fiji, the rise of Rewa and its tributaries and the presence of the Europeans and their efficient firearms. The Lovoni people found themselves in the center of this major conflict and power struggle and often played the determining role of supporting whichever side suited them best, based on kinship ties. Their unfailing support of the ailing and declining house of the Roko Tui Bau and his descendants would mark the fate of this fiercely independent and proud people.
