= 1923 Fijian general election =

General elections were held in Fiji in 1923.

== Electoral system ==
The Legislative Council consisted of 12 official members (eleven civil servants and a British subject not holding public office), seven elected Europeans and two appointed Fijians. The Governor served as President of the council.

The Europeans were elected from six constituencies; Eastern, Northern, Southern, Suva, Vanua Levu & Taveuni and Western. Voting was restricted to men aged 21 or over who had been born to European parents (or a European father and was able to read, speak and write English) who were British subjects and had been continuously resident in Fiji for 12 months, owning at least £20 of freehold or leasehold property or having an annual income of at least £120, and were not on the public payroll.

Constituency	Geographical area
Eastern	Lau Province, Lomaiviti Province
Northern	Ba District, Colo North Province, Ra Province
Southern	Colo East Province, Kadavu Province, Naitasiri Province, Namosi Province, Rewa Province (except Suva), Serua Province, Tailevu Province
Suva	Suva Municipality
Vanua Levu and Taveuni	Bua Province, Cakaudrove Province, Macuata Province
Western	Colo West Province, Lautoka District, Nadi District, Nadroga Province

== Results ==
Constituency	Candidate	Votes	%	Notes
Eastern	John Maynard Hedstrom	82	78.1	Re-elected
Eastern	C.A. Brough	23	21.9	
Eastern	Informal votes	1	–	
Northern	Henry Lamb Kennedy	Unopposed		Elected
Southern	Alport Barker	96	55.8	Elected
Southern	John Linn Hunt	76	44.2	
Southern	Informal votes	1	–	
Suva	Henry Marks	273	39.0	Re-elected
Suva	Henry Milne Scott	234	33.4	Re-elected
Suva	George Frier Grahame	193	27.6	
Vanua Levu & Taveuni	Arthur Hallam Roberts	92	49.2	Elected
Vanua Levu & Taveuni	William Edmund Willoughby-Tottenham	90	48.1	Unseated
Vanua Levu & Taveuni	J. McConnell	5	2.7	
Vanua Levu & Taveuni	Informal votes	4	–	
Western	Percival William Faddy	94	59.1	Elected
Western	Charles Wimbledon Thomas	65	40.9	Unseated
Western	Informal votes	4	–	
Source: Fiji Elections

== Aftermath ==
Badri Maharaj was nominated as the member representing Indo-Fijians, but subsequently resigned and the position was left unfilled.
