= James Ramchandar Rao =

Fijian politician

Member of Legislative Council (Fiji) Eastern Indian Constituency
- In office 1929–1929
- Preceded by: new electoral division
- Succeeded by: vacant
- Resigned the seat two weeks after being sworn in.

James Ranchandar Rao (a.k.a. James Ramchandar Maharaj ) was one of the three Indo-Fijians elected to the Legislative Council of Fiji in October 1929 when Indo-Fijians were given the first opportunity to elect their own representatives in the 1929 elections. The other two were Vishnu Deo and Parmanand Singh.

Only males over 21 years of age, who were British subjects and resident continuously in Fiji for 12 months, able to read and write in either English, Hindi, Telugu, Tamil, Urdu or Gurmukhi, in possession of freehold or leasehold in Fiji valued at least 5 pounds per annum for 6 months before the closing of the register or had cash income of not less than 75 pounds per annum or held a government or municipal licence worth at least 5 pounds were eligible to vote. Consequently, only 1,404 out of an Indo-Fijians population of 75,000 were registered to vote. James Ramchandar Rao contested the Eastern Indian Division, which included the islands of Vanua Levu and the Lau and Lomaiviti Group of Islands. His opponent was Khalil Sahim. There were 101 registered electors in the constituency of whom 63 voted for Rao, 20 for Sahim and 5 spoilt their ballot paper.

Two weeks after being sworn in he, together with the other two Indo-Fijians representatives, resigned when a motion asking for equal political rights for Indo-Fijians was defeated.

Rao was the proprietor of one of the first picture theatres in Fiji in the old capital of Levuka, on the island of Ovalau.
