= 1908 Fijian general election =

General elections were held in Fiji on 23 March and 10 April 1908.

== Electoral system ==
The Legislative Council consisted of ten civil servants, six elected Europeans and two appointed Fijians. The six Europeans were elected from three constituencies; Levuka (one seat), Suva (two seats) and a "Planters" constituency covering the rest of the colony (three seats). Voting was restricted to European men aged 21 or over who were British subjects and earned at least £120 a year or owned property with a yearly value of £20.

Voting was held in Levuka and Suva on 23 March, and in the Planters constituency on 10 April.

== Results ==
Constituency	Candidate	Votes	%	Notes
Levuka	John Maynard Hedstrom	29	47.5	Elected
Levuka	David Robbie	25	41.0	Unseated
Levuka	F. Volk	7	11.5	
Planters	Leslie Edward Brown	159	24.3	Elected
Planters	Alfred Hancock Witherow	155	23.7	Elected
Planters	Adam Coubrough	152	23.2	Re-elected
Planters	James Burton Turner	148	22.6	Unseated
Planters	J. McConnell	40	6.1	
Suva	Henry Milne Scott	84	29.4	Elected
Suva	George Fox	72	25.2	Elected
Suva	Simeon Lewis Lazarus	70	24.5	Unseated
Suva	Henry Marks	60	21.0	Unseated
Suva	Source: Ali			

=== Nominated members ===
Position	Member
Governor	Everard im Thurn
Agent-General of Immigration	Arthur Robert Coates
Attorney General	Albert Ehrhardt
Chief Medical Officer	George Lynch
Collector of Customs	John Kenneth Murray Ross
Colonial Secretary	Eyre Hutson
Commissioner, Colo North and East	Adolph Joske
Commissioner of Lands	Dyson Blair
Commissioner of Works	William Charles Simmons
Inspector-General of Constabulary	Islay McOwan
Native Commissioner	William Sutherland
Fijian appointees	Joni Madraiwiwi I
Fijian appointees	Kadavu Levu
Source: Fiji Blue Book, Fiji Elections
