= David Robbie (Fijian politician) =

Scottish-born businessman, planter and politician in Fiji

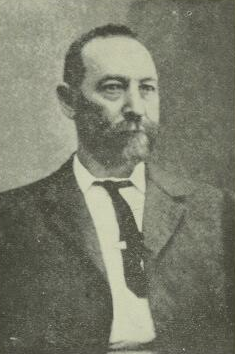

Member of the Legislative Council for Levuka
- In office 1905–1908
- Succeeded by: John Maynard Hedstrom

Personal details
- Born: 4 March 1849 Forfar, United Kingdom
- Died: 1940 (age 91) Levuka, Fiji
- Profession: Sailor, Trader, Planter

Captain David Robbie (4 March 1849 – 1940) was a Scottish-born businessman, planter and politician in Fiji. He served as a member of the Legislative Council between 1905 and 1908.

== Biography ==
Robbie was born in the Scottish town of Forfar in 1849. After being educated in the town, his first job was as a telegraph clerk in the Scottish Railway Company. He then became a sailor, joining a ship trading between Australia and eastern India. In 1872 he moved to the Thames goldfield in New Zealand, before becoming a coastal trader. He then moved to Fiji in 1876, where he bought his own boat, a schooner named Midge, and traded across the Pacific islands. A sunken lagoon that he discovered to the north-east of Wallis was named Robbie Shoal.

He became a manager in the Kopsen & Co company in Suva in 1882. After the company's premises burnt down in 1889, he moved to Levuka, where he married and started running the Royal Hotel. He subsequently established his own merchants firm, Robbie and Evans, which was later bought by Burns Philp. He then established a cocoa, coffee, rubber, tea and vanilla plantation on Vanua Levu. Due to his influence in business, he became President of the Levuka Chamber of Commerce. He also acted as Harbourmaster at Levuka on several occasions.

Robbie entered local politics in Levuka, serving as a member of Levuka Town Council for over two decades. He was also warden and mayor of the town, and chaired the town's school board. In 1905 he contested the Levuka seat in the first elections to the Fijian Legislative Council, and was elected unopposed. However, in the 1908 elections he lost by four votes to John Maynard Hedstrom. He challenged Hedstrom again in the 1911 elections, but lost by six votes.

After retiring he lived on his Wainunu estate on Vanua Levu. His wife died in 1924, and Robbie died in Levuka in 1940. He was described as "tall, and very erect... even to his nineties".
