= St John's College, Fiji =

Coordinates: 17.6332°S 178.8135°E

St John's College
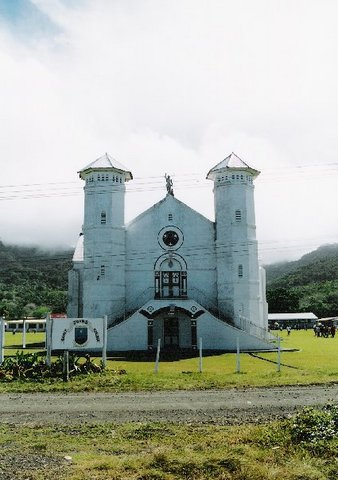
- Levuka, Lomaiviti; Fiji

Information
- Motto: Centered In Christ
- Denomination: Roman Catholic
- Established: 1894
- Oversight: Archdiocese of Suva
- Principal: Alosio Saukuru
- Enrollment: 682 Students
- Language: Fijian & English
- Colors: Blue and White
- Website: http://www.sjcawaci.school.fj/

Saint John's College (commonly called St. Johns College Cawaci) is a Roman Catholic secondary school, located in Cawaci, on the island of Ovalau, in the province of Lomaiviti, Fiji.

It is a co-educational boarding school. While administered by the Catholic Archdiocese, it also accepts non-Catholic students and apart from priests, nuns and brothers of religious orders, has government-paid staff.

== History ==
St John's College is one of Fiji's oldest Catholic mission schools, established at Nasarete (Nazareth) a small hill within the Cawaci Catholic Mission land in 1894. The school catered first for native Fijians of chiefly rank. This class-based enrolment was later abolished. The Marist Brothers were responsible for teaching the boys. Brothers Maurice, Vincent and Cloman were the first teachers. The school opened with 12 students and by 1906 there were 80 boys from all parts of Fiji. By 1929 there were 100 pupils and in 1938 there were 300. In 1937 the boys aged 6 to 16, were required to pay £1 on entry to pay for their sulu, soap, textbook and exercise books. They were taught in Fijian and then in English.

Cawaci is a piece of land which the Fiji Catholic Mission bought from a European settler and cattle grazer, Thomas Perry King Wilson in 1890. On April 26, 1890, the lands of Cawaci and Cicia were formally transferred to the trustees of the Catholic Mission by the Registrar of the Supreme Court of Fiji, Mr John Langford, in Suva. The trustees of the Catholic Mission were: Fr. Jean-Baptiste Bréhéret; Fr. Joseph Laberre; and Fr.Ephrem Marie Bertreux. They were all Marist priests and Fr. Bréhéret was in charge. On May 22, 1890, Mr Wilson, a grazer, planter, stockholder and former property owner of Cawaci and Cicia sold his cattle to the mission. This included 4 branded Toro bulls, some cows and twenty pigs. He also entered into an agreement to lease the property and to pay a yearly rental. There is not much information as to when Mr. Wilson left Cawaci or where he went to after that. The Catholic mission in Cawaci was firmly established by 1893 when the Catechist School was established having moved from Loreto. In the early 1990s the Fiji Archdiocese sold a small portion of the land in Cicia to the Government who needed to relocate their Public Works Department (PWD) section in Levuka as its present site was congested. The land in Cawaci belongs to the Archdiocese.

== Present day ==
Today St John's College is co-educational boarding school catering also for non-Catholic students.

== Clergy ==
St John's College has a long history of producing Roman Catholic priests, nuns and brothers. The former and current head of the Fiji Catholic Church are past students at the school, Petero Mataca and Peter Loy Chong.

== Alumni ==
The St John's College past pupil's association recently held its reunion with Tongan Prime Minister, Feleti Sevele, a former pupil (later educated at Marist Brothers High School) as chief guest at the event held at the school. Amongst other notable alumni are:

- Archbishop Petero Mataca - Former Head of the Catholic Church in Fiji
- Jone Naisara - former Cabinet Minister
- Pio Tikoduadua - Secretary in the Fiji Prime Minister's Office
- Ratu Suliano Matanitobua - Chief of Namosi and former Fiji cabinet minister.
- Dr Patrick Vakaoti - Academic based in New Zealand
