= William Brill =

William Brill may refer to:

- William H. Brill (1871–1923), American journalist
- William Brill (RAAF officer) (1916–1964), Australian military pilot
- Bill Brill (1931–2011), American sportswriter
