= Frederick Clapcott =

New Zealand settler in Fiji

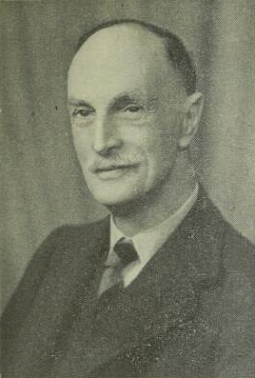

Member of the Legislative Council
- In office 1917–1923
- Preceded by: Henry Lamb Kennedy
- Succeeded by: Henry Lamb Kennedy
- Constituency: Northern

Personal details
- Born: New Zealand
- Died: 14 July 1941 (age 73) Ba, Fiji
- Profession: Planter

Frederick Charles Clapcott (died 14 July 1941) was a New Zealand settler in Fiji. He served in the Legislative Council between 1917 and 1923, and represented Fiji in Lawn Bowls at the 1938 British Empire Games.

== Biography ==
Born in New Zealand, Clapcott began working for the Colonial Sugar Refining Company at Nausori in 1894, transferring to Ba later in the year. After leaving the company, he bought the Yala Levu estate from the company.

Clapcott successfully contested the Northern constituency of the Legislative Council in the 1917 elections, unseating the incumbent MLC Henry Lamb Kennedy. He was re-elected in 1920, but did not stand in the 1923 elections, in which Kennedy was returned unopposed.

Clapcott represented Fiji in the Lawn Bowls competition at the 1938 British Empire Games, taking part in the Men's Rinks (Fours).

He died in Ba on 14 July 1941.
