= 1911 Fijian general election =

General elections were held in Fiji on 28 April 1911.

== Electoral system ==
The Legislative Council consisted of eleven civil servants, six elected Europeans and two appointed Fijians. Previously the six Europeans had been elected from three constituencies; Levuka (one seat), Suva (two seats) and a "Planters" constituency covering the rest of the colony (three seats). However, prior to the 1911 elections, the Planters constituency was split into three single-member constituencies; Eastern, Northern and Southern.

== Results ==
Constituency	Candidate	Votes	%	Notes
Eastern	Adam Coubrough	70	75.3	Re-elected
Eastern	J. McConnell	23	24.7	
Eastern	Informal votes	1	–	
Levuka	John Maynard Hedstrom	40	54.1	Re-elected
Levuka	David Robbie	34	45.9	
Levuka	Informal votes	1	–	
Northern	Charles Wimbledon Thomas	55	59.8	Elected
Northern	E. Duncan	37	40.2	
Southern	James Burton Turner	80	49.4	Elected
Southern	Leslie Edward Brown	58	35.8	Unseated
Southern	E.F. Powell	24	14.8	
Southern	Informal votes	2	–	
Suva	Henry Marks	139	46.6	Elected
Suva	Henry Milne Scott	85	28.5	Re-elected
Suva	George Fox	74	24.8	Unseated
Source: Ali

=== Appointed members ===
The nominated members were appointed on 3 June.

Position	Member
Governor (President)	Francis Henry May
Agent-General of Immigration	Arthur Robert Coates
Attorney-General	Albert Ehrhardt
Chief Justice	Charles Major
Chief Medical Officer	George Lynch
Collector of Customs	John Kenneth Murray Ross
Colonial Secretary	Eyre Hutson
Commissioner of Lands	Dyson Blair
Commissioner of Works	Hugh Daniel Badcock
Inspector-General of Constabulary	Islay McOwan
Native Commissioner	William Sutherland
Receiver-General	Richard Sims Donkin Rankine
Fijian member	Joni Madraiwiwi I
Fijian member	Penaia Kadavu Levu
Source: Fiji Blue Book
