= Charles Wimbledon Thomas =

Fijian businessman and politician (1862–1948)

Member of the Legislative Council
- In office 1911–1914
- Preceded by: Seat created
- Succeeded by: Henry Lamb Kennedy
- Constituency: Northern
- In office 1914–1917
- Preceded by: Seat created
- Succeeded by: Reginald Harricks
- Constituency: Western
- In office 1920–1923
- Preceded by: Reginald Harricks
- Succeeded by: Percival William Faddy
- Constituency: Western

Personal details
- Born: 15 April 1862 Clarence, Tasmania
- Died: 23 May 1948 (aged 86) Lautoka, Fiji
- Profession: Businessman

Charles Wimbledon Thomas (15 April 1862 – 23 May 1948) was a Fijian businessman and politician. He was a member of the Legislative Council three times between 1911 and 1923.

== Biography ==
Thomas was born in Clarence in Tasmania to William Isaac Thomas and Kezia Celia Thomas (née Chapman). His father was a lawyer and moved to Fiji to practice in Levuka. Thomas was present at the signing of the Deed of Cession in 1874, which transformed the Kingdom of Fiji into the Colony of Fiji. He started work as a clerk before moving to Yaqara to manage an estate owned by his father. After being joined by his brother Willie, the two opened butchers shops in Ba and Lautoka.

Thomas contested the new Northern constituency in the 1911 general election and was elected to the Legislative Council. In the 1914 elections he ran in the new Western seat, and was re-elected. Although he lost his seat to Reginald Harricks in the 1917 elections, he stood again in the constituency in 1920 and was returned to the Legislative Council, defeating John Percy Bayly as Harricks did not defend his seat. Thomas was unseated again in the 1923 elections, losing to Percival William Faddy. He subsequently unsuccessfully contested the seat again in the 1926 and 1929 elections, losing to Faddy and Bayly respectively.

Thomas died at Lautoka Hospital on 23 May 1948 at the age of 86.
