= Sacred Heart Church, Levuka =

Church building in Levuka, Fiji

Sacred Heart Church
- Sacred Heart Catholic Church
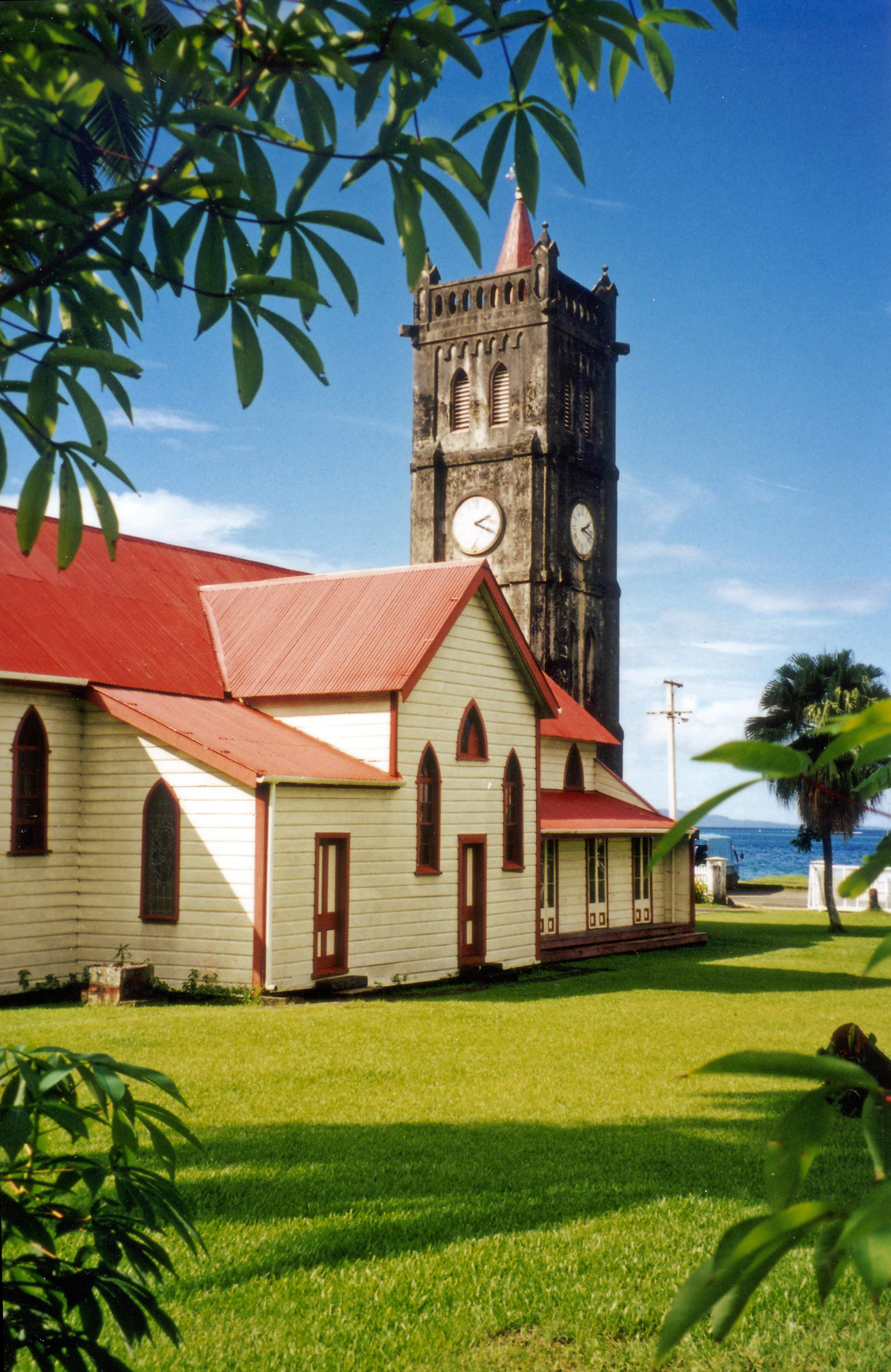
- Sacred Heart Church, Levuka

Religion
- Affiliation: Roman Catholic
- Leadership: Presbytery Sacred Heart Mission
- Year consecrated: 1858
- Status: Functional

Location
- Location: Beach Street, Levuka, Ovalau, Fiji
- Interactive map of Sacred Heart Church
- Coordinates: 17°40′56″S 178°50′3″E

Architecture
- Architect: Father Louyot
- Style: Gothic Revival architecture

Specifications
- Capacity: 250
- Width: 13 by 13 feet (4.0 m × 4.0 m)
- Height (max): 80 feet (24 m)
- Materials: Wood, stone

The Sacred Heart Church, also known as the Church of the Sacred Heart or Sacred Heart Catholic Church, is a Roman Catholic church on the Fijian island of Ovalau, situated on Beach Street in the town of Levuka. The church's clock tower serves as a lighthouse to guide the ships to the port through an opening in the reef. The church is part of the heritage status accorded to Levuka by its inscription as a World Heritage Site by UNESCO.

== Features ==
The church, presbytery, and its detached tower were built by Father Louyot in traditional Gothic Revival architecture. The church is laid out in the form of a Latin Cross with the weatherboard structure, measuring 60 by 24 feet (18.3 m × 7.3 m), able to accommodate 250 people. The harmonium was added by Alexandre Fils. The presbytery, destroyed by a cyclone in 1905, was a two-storey wooden structure adjacent to the church.

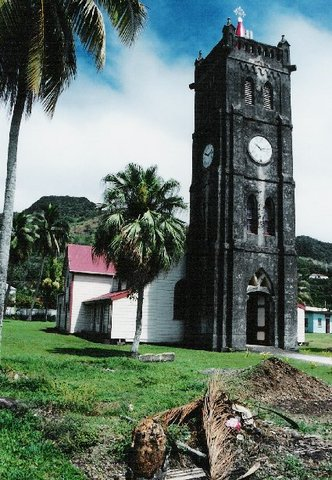
Front view of the tower and its spire in the form of a cross.

The 80-foot (24 m) high tower, square in shape, is constructed from stone masonry and measures 13 by 13 feet (4.0 m × 4.0 m). Its belfry contains four bells. The clock fitted on the tower is circular in shape and rings twice every hour at an interval of one minute; in local parlance the first ring is said to indicate the local "Fiji Time". The spire of the tower is fitted with a neon light in the form of a cross, which is used by ships to navigate safely through the Levuka Passage to the port; this light works in synchronization with another green light fitted on the hill.

== History ==
The church was built in 1858 by the Marist Fathers as a part of the Presbytery of the Sacred Heart Mission, in Levuka, which was the first historical capital of Fiji during British colonial rule. Fr. Jean-Baptiste Bréhéret served as the first priest of the church; the clock tower which is independent of the church was constructed to commemorate his joining the church. It is said to be the "oldest and best developed catholic mission in Fiji". The church was expanded in ensuing years. The church is part of the heritage status accorded to Levuka by its inscription as a UNESCO World Heritage Site in 2013 under Criteria (cultural) (ii) and (iv).

== Bibliography ==
- Britton, Henry (1870). Fiji in 1870: Being the Letters of "The Argus" Special Correspondent, with a Complete Map and Gazetteer of the Fijian Archipelago (Public domain ed.). Samuel Mullen.
- Fiji Blue Book (1899). Fiji Blue Book for the Year 1899 (Public domain ed.). Government Printer, South Africa.
- Stanley, David (1 January 1996). Fiji Islands Handbook. David Stanley. p. 198. ISBN 978-1-56691-038-5.
- Starnes, Dean; Luckham, Nana (2009). Lonely Planet Fiji. Lonely Planet. ISBN 978-1-74104-793-6.
