= Alfred Hancock Witherow =

Former member of the Fijian Legislative Council (1908-1911)

Member of the Legislative Council
- In office 1908–1911
- Constituency: Planters

Personal details
- Born: 25 February 1872; Hawke's Bay, New Zealand
- Died: 10 September 1948 (aged 76); Waila, Fiji

Alfred Hancock Witherow (25 February 1872 – 10 September 1948) was a New Zealand-born Fijian politician who served as a member of the Legislative Council between 1908 and 1911.

== Biography ==
Witherow was born in Hawke's Bay in New Zealand. He emigrated to Fiji in 1894 and initially grew sugar cane in Rewa. He later switched to growing bananas and became a major exporter to Australia and New Zealand, before concentrating on dairy farming. He married Lily Bailey in 1904, with whom he had two sons and four daughters.

In the 1908 general elections he contested the Planters seat and was elected to the Legislative Council. He did not run in the next elections in 1911.

Witherow died at his home in Waila in Rewa in September 1948 at the age of 76.
