= Visoto =

Village in Ovalau, Fiji

- Village
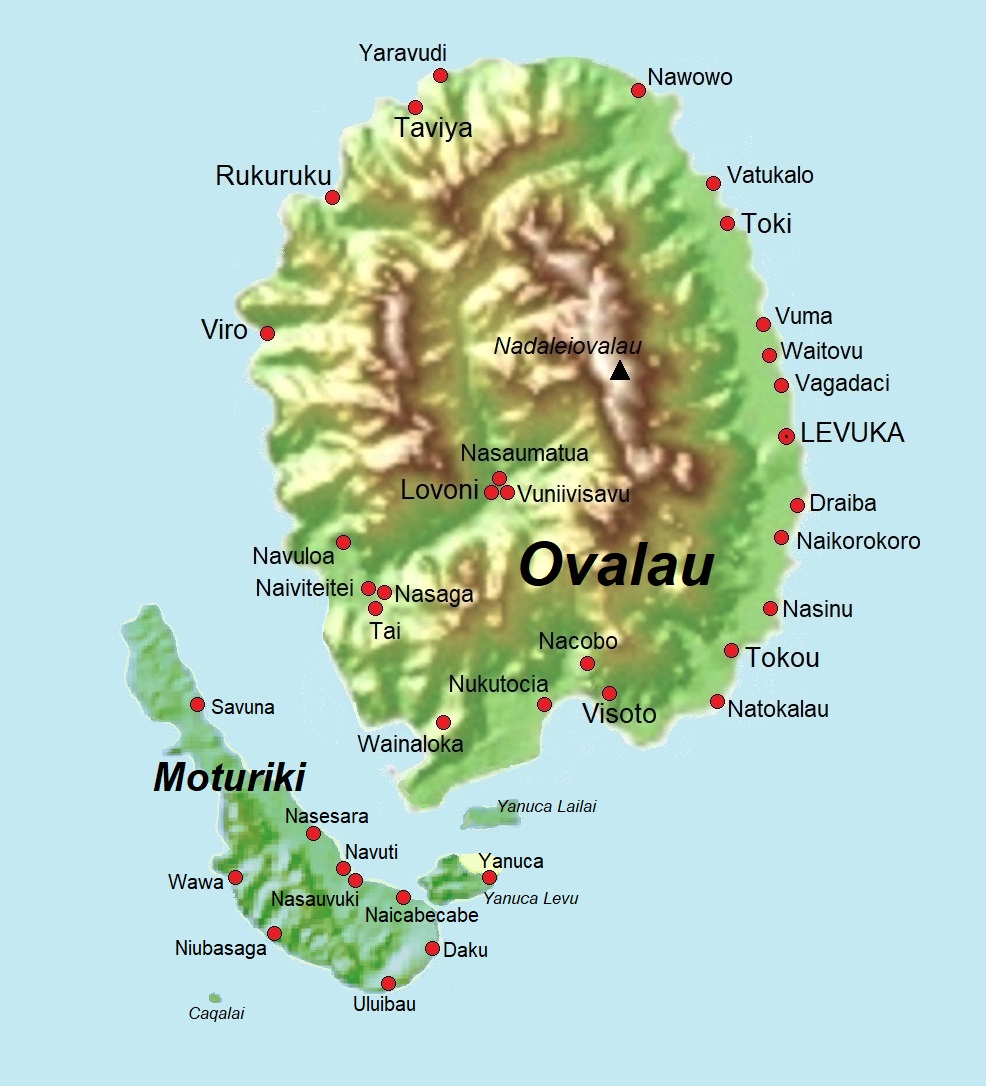
- Ovalau Island, with Visoto in the south

- Location in Fiji
- Country: Fiji
- Island: Ovalau
- Division: Eastern Division
- Province: Lomaiviti
- Tikina: Ovalau
- Time zone: UTC+12 (FJT)
  - Summer (DST): UTC+13 (FJST)

Visoto is a village situated on the south east coast of Ovalau, Fiji. These settlers are the descendant people of Lovoni. The chiefly title is Turaga na Vavanua na Sauturaga. The village is located next to Nacobo Village.

The Visoto Kindergarten opened in 2016, initially having 28 students, with 151 students by the end of the year.
