= Robert Crompton =

Robert Crompton may refer to:

- Bob Crompton (1879–1941), English international footballer
- Robert Crompton (politician) (1869–1958), lawyer and politician in Fiji
