= John Maynard Hedstrom =

Fijian businessman and politician

Member of the Legislative Council
- In office 1908–1914
- Preceded by: David Robbie
- Succeeded by: Seat abolished
- Constituency: Levuka
- In office 1914–1937
- Preceded by: Seat created
- Succeeded by: Harold Brockett Gibson
- Constituency: Eastern (European)

Nominated Member of the Legislative Council
- In office 1937

Personal details
- Born: 22 February 1872 Levuka, Fiji
- Died: 2 June 1951 (aged 79) Tamavua, Fiji

Sir John Maynard Hedstrom (22 February 1872 – 2 June 1951) was a Fijian businessman and politician. He served as a member of the Legislative Council for over 30 years. Alongside Robert Crompton, Henry Marks and Henry Milne Scott, he was one of the 'big four' that heavily influenced the Fijian economy and political sphere in the first half of the 20th century.

== Biography ==
Maynard Hedstrom was born in Levuka on 22 February 1872, the son of N.S. Hedstrom, a Swedish shipmaster who was employed as a harbour master. He was educated at Suva Public School and Wesley College in Australia, before graduating from the University of Melbourne. After returning to Fiji, he initially worked in the post office in Suva, before going into business, joining the Union Steamship Company and becoming manager of the Levuka branch. He later became a partner in Brown & Joske and was involved in several other companies before founding the Morris Hedstrom firm with Percy Morris in 1898, which went on to become the country's leading retailer. He became President of the Chamber of Commerce in 1924, a position he held for 23 years.

Maynard Hedstrom entered politics in the 1900s, serving as mayor of Levuka in 1905 and 1906. In 1908 he was elected to the Legislative Council in the Levuka constituency, defeating the incumbent David Robbie. He was re-elected in 1911, again defeating Robbie. He became an honorary consul for Sweden on 5 December 1913. Prior to the 1914 elections, the constituency was reorganised and renamed Eastern. Maynard Hedstrom was returned unopposed and held the seat until the 1937 elections; during this time he was returned unopposed again in 1917, after which he became a member of the Executive Council. He was returned unopposed in 1920, 1929, 1932 and only faced opponents in 1923 and 1926, winning easily on both occasions. He did not contest a seat in the 1937 elections, at which point he also left the Executive Council, but was chosen as one of the two nominated European members on the Legislative Council. However, he resigned in December 1937 after a dispute with the Governor.

In the 1922 New Year Honours, Maynard Hedstrom became the first resident of Fiji to be knighted. He was also awarded the Order of the Polar Star by the King of Sweden in 1939 after serving as honorary Vice-Consul for Sweden in Suva. In 1936 American botanist Albert Charles Smith named a genus of flowering plants from Fiji (in the Rubiaceae family) Hedstromia after him.

Maynard Hedstrom married Grace Eastgate in 1895. The couple had five children; three sons and two daughters. Grace died on 2 May 1931. Maynard Hedstrom subsequently married Joyce Beauchamp during the 1930s. He died at his home in the Tamavua area of Suva on 2 June 1951 at the age of 79.
