= Henry Lamb Kennedy =

Fijian politician

Member of the Legislative Council
- In office 1914–1917
- Preceded by: Charles Wimbledon Thomas
- Succeeded by: Frederick Clapcott
- Constituency: Northern
- In office 1923–1926
- Preceded by: Frederick Clapcott
- Succeeded by: Hugh Ragg
- Constituency: Northern

Personal details
- Born: New Zealand
- Died: 25 January 1933 (aged 74); Ba, Fiji

Henry Lamb Kennedy (died 25 January 1933) was a Fijian politician who served for two terms in the Legislative Council.

== Biography ==
Kennedy was born in New Zealand and attended King's School in Auckland. His family moved to Fiji in 1875, with his father becoming a planter. Kennedy was involved in cattle farming and keeping horses, and was a skilled amateur jockey.

Kennedy was elected to the Legislative Council in the Northern constituency in the 1914 elections. Although he was defeated by in the 1917 elections, he returned to contest the constituency again in 1923 and was elected unopposed. In the 1926 elections he was defeated by Hugh Ragg.

Kennedy died in Ba Cottage Hospital on 25 January 1933 at the age of 74.
