= William H. Brill =

American journalist (1871–1923)

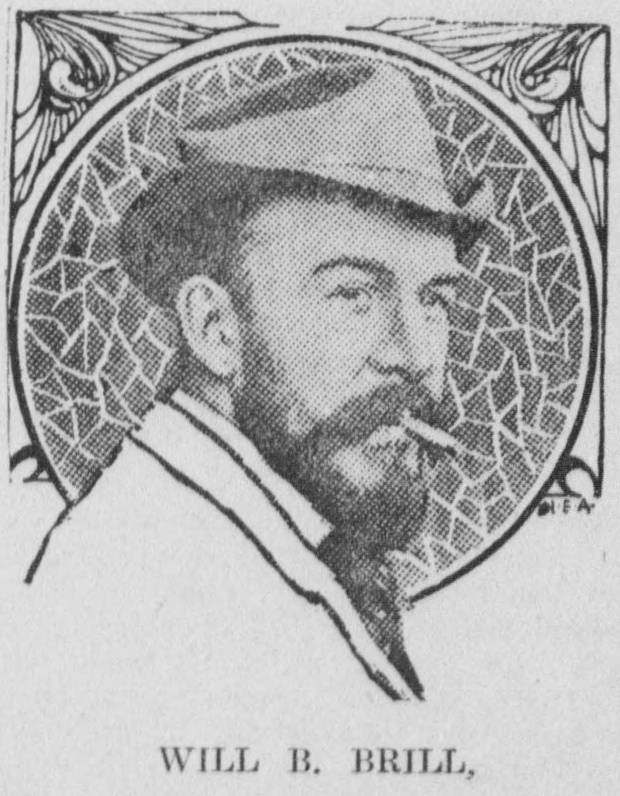
William H. Brill, in 1904

William Hascal Brill, also known as William H. Brill, Will H. Brill, and W. H. Brill, (April 16, 1871 in Litchfield, Minnesota – November 30, 1923 in Saint Paul, Minnesota) was an American journalist who at various times worked for the Associated Press, Reuters, and the Newspaper Enterprise Association.

His journalism career began as a reporter for the St. Paul Pioneer Press, in which role he reported on the Battle of Leech Lake; Gerald Vizenor has attributed to Brill the idea that the battle began "with the accidental discharge of a soldier's rifle".

In February 1904, Brill traveled to Japan to report on the Russo-Japanese War as a war correspondent. He accompanied the Second Japanese Army in Manchuria throughout the entire conflict.

In 1907, the Emperor Meiji awarded Brill the Order of the Precious Crown, seventh class, for his activities during the Russo-Japanese War.

Excerpts of Brill's war coverage are included the compilation In Many Wars, by Many War Correspondents, edited by Frederick Palmer and George Lynch.
