= 1905 Fijian general election =

General elections were held in Fiji on 22 March and 8 April 1905.

== Background ==
The previous general elections had been held in 1871. Although fresh elections had been due to take place in 1873, they were cancelled after protests from Europeans about the plans to let Fijians vote.

In 1904 a new Legislative Council was established, consisting of ten official members from the civil service, six elected Europeans and two Fijians chosen by the Governor from a list of six candidates provided by the Council of Chiefs. Although Indo-Fijians were able to vote in municipal elections, voting practices in the community were considered suspect and the Governor noted that he "did not consider it necessary to provide for the representation of the Indians and Pacific Islanders because they had shown themselves open to corruption at the municipal elections." Instead, the Indo-Fijian community was represented only by the Agent-General for Immigration, one of the six civil servants in the Council.

== Electoral system ==
The new constitution originally envisaged six elected members elected from four constituencies, of which two were geographic (the two-seat constituency of Suva and the one-seat constituency of Levuka) and two based on profession (a two-seat constituency of people involved in cultivating land for anything except sugar with at least 100 acres and a one-seat constituency for directors and managers of sugar companies). People involved in cultivating land were not eligible to vote in the geographic constituencies.

However, prior to the elections, the electoral system was revised to combine the two non-geographic constituencies into a three-seat "Planters" constituency, which covered all of Fiji except Levuka and Suva. Voting was held in the Planters constituency on 8 April and in Suva on 22 March.

== Results ==
Constituency	Candidate	Votes	%	Notes
Levuka	David Robbie	Unopposed		Elected
Planters	James Burton Turner	127	23.7	Elected
Planters	James Murray	118	22.1	Elected
Planters	Adam Coubrough	86	16.1	Elected
Planters	E. F. Powell	77	14.4	
Planters	H. Shaw	73	13.6	
Planters	J. H. Garrick	32	6.0	
Planters	J. McConnell	22	4.1	
Planters	Informal votes	11	–	
Suva	Henry Marks	74	28.4	Elected
Suva	William McRae	59	22.6	Elected
Suva	Simeon Lewis Lazarus	57	21.8	
Suva	L. E. Brown	28	10.7	
Suva	A. H. Ogilve	20	7.7	
Suva	L. E. Benjamin	8	3.1	
Suva	J. Callaghan	6	2.3	
Suva	George Fox	6	2.3	
Suva	G. L. Griffiths	3	1.1	
Suva	Informal	6	–	
Source: Ali

== Aftermath ==
Following the elections Josefa Lala and Joni Madraiwiwi were appointed as the Fijian members. Lala died later in the year and his place was taken by Kadavu Levu.

James Murray resigned during the term of the Council. In the subsequent by-election, Simeon Lewis Lazarus defeated H. Shaw by 105 to 62 votes, with four informal votes cast.
