= Henry Marks =

Australian-Fijian politician (1861–1938)

Sir Henry Marks

Member of the Legislative Council
- In office 1905–1908, 1911–1929
- Constituency: Suva

Personal details
- Born: 5 February 1861 Melbourne, Victoria
- Died: 5 June 1938 (age 77)
- Spouse: Annie Abrahams
- Profession: Businessman

Sir Henry Marks CBE JP (5 February 1861 – 5 June 1938) was an Australian-born Fijian politician, serving as a member of the Legislative Council of Fiji for over twenty years. Alongside Robert Crompton, John Maynard Hedstrom and Henry Milne Scott, he was one of the 'big four' that heavily influenced the Fijian economy and political sphere in the first half of the 20th century.

== Biography ==
Marks was born in Melbourne, Victoria in 1861, the son of Jewish parents Henry Marks and his wife Mary (née Aaron or Heron), who were from Birmingham in England. He moved to Fiji at the age of 20, initially working as an import/export trader, before becoming a labour agent in New Caledonia, the New Hebrides and the Solomon Islands. When he returned to Fiji he established Henry Marks & Co, a merchant and commercial agency firm. He was involved in several other businesses, serving as chair of the board at Pacific Insurance and Sturt Ogilvie and as a director at Brown & Joske, Morris Hedstrom and Fiji Oil Mills. He married Annie Abrahams in 1883; the couple had three daughters and two sons. He joined the Fiji Volunteer Force when it was formed in 1898, initially holding the rank of a captain, before becoming a Major in 1902. In 1937 he was made Honorary Colonel of the Fiji Defence Force.

In 1905 Marks was elected to the Legislative Council for the Suva constituency in the first elections since 1871. Although he lost his seat in the 1908 elections, he returned to the Council following the 1911 elections, and was subsequently re-elected in 1914, 1917, 1920, 1923 and 1926. During his time in the Legislative Council he also served on the Executive Council. He was Commissioner of Currency from 1913 until 1929, and heavily involved in the introduction of the Fijian pound; as a result, his name was included on the banknotes for several years. Marks was also a longstanding member of Suva Municipal Council until retiring at the start of the 1930s and served as the town's mayor from 1926 until 1930.

Following changes to the setup of the Legislative Council in 1929, Marks contested the Southern seat in the 1929 elections, but was defeated by Henry Milne Scott and Alport Barker.

Marks was also involved in philanthropy and donated £5,000 (plus another £5,000 from his company) to found the Colonial War Memorial Hospital in Suva, later also donating an x-ray machine to it. In the 1918 New Year Honours he was made a CBE; he was knighted in the 1933 Birthday Honours. Marks died in 1938.
