= 1871 Fijian general election =

General elections were held in Fiji in 1871 to elect members of the new Legislative Assembly.

== Background ==
In June 1871 King Cakobau created a House of Delegates, with elections taking place soon afterwards. The House passed amendments to the constitution, which provided for a Privy Council consisting of a high chief from each province, the governors of provincial councils and members of the cabinet, and an elected Legislative Assembly composed of Europeans. Writs for the elections to the Legislative Assembly were issued on 1 August and the House of Delegates ended its final session on 23 August.

== Electoral system ==
The Legislative Assembly had 28 elected members, elected from 21 constituencies.

== Results ==
Constituency	Elected members
Ba District	DeCourcey Ireland
Bua District	Frank Otway
Bua District	S.A. Quinn
Central (Lomaiviti) District	John Temple Sagar
Dreketi District	J. Glenny
Lau District	W. Hennings
Lau District	R.S. Swanston
Lau District	Rupert Ryder
Kadavu District	T.W. White
Levuka District	Sydney Burt
Levuka District	F.W. Hennings
Levuka District	Dr. Ryley
Lower Rewa District	E. Wecker
Macuata District	James Stewart Butters
Nadroga District	T. King
Nadi District	Otty Cudlip
Natewa District	A. Tempest
Navua District	C.H. Clarkson
Ovalau District	W. Scott
Savusavu District	A. Barrack
Suva District	W.H. Surplice
Tailevu District	H. Bentley
Tavua & Rakiraki District	George Austin Woods
Taveuni District	J. McConnell
Taveuni District	John Bates Thurston
Upper Rewa District	H. Eastgate
Upper Rewa District	W. Reece
Yasawas District	J.S. Smith
Source: Fiji Election Archive

== Aftermath ==
Following the elections, the Assembly was due to meet for the first time on 1 November, but this was postponed until 3 November after strong winds prevented Cakobau from attending. Former mayor of Melbourne James Stewart Butters was elected speaker. Seven of the elected members decided to go into opposition and formed the Constitution Party with Robert Wilson Hamilton as chairman.

Fresh elections were due to be held in 1873 with Fijians allowed to vote. However, following protests by Europeans, the elections were cancelled. The next elections did not take place until 1905.
