= Herbert Valentine Tarte =

Fijian planter and politician (1876–1936)

Member of the Legislative Council
- In office 1920–1922
- Preceded by: John Francis Dyer
- Succeeded by: William Edmund Willoughby-Tottenham
- Constituency: Vanua Levu & Taveuni

Personal details
- Born: 1876; Vatu Wiri, Fiji
- Died: 1936; Melbourne, Australia

Herbert Valentine Tarte (1876–1936) was a Fijian planter and politician. He served in the Legislative Council in the early 1920s.

== Biography ==
Tarte was born in 1876 in the Taveuni village of Vatu Wiri, the oldest son of Clarissa and James Valentine Tarte, who had settled in Taveuni in 1868. He was educated at Brighton Grammar School in Melbourne and then worked for the Imperial Insurance Company for a year. He subsequently worked for Swan Hill and a stock and station business, before joining the family business. This became Tarte Brothers of Taveuni, and held 10% of the copra market in the mid-1920s. He married the daughter of senior civil servant James Thomas.

In 1920 he was elected to the Legislative Council from the Vanua Levu & Taveuni constituency. After being elected, he introduced a motion for Chinese labour to be recruited, which failed. He did not complete a full term, with William Edmund Willoughby-Tottenham elected to replace him in October 1922.

He died in Melbourne in 1936.
