= Alfred Wendt =

Fijian cricketer

Personal information
- Full name: Alfred John Wendt
- Born: 1913; Levuka, Lomaiviti Province, Fiji
- Died: 1996 (aged 82–83)

International information
- National side: Fiji

Career statistics
Competition	FC
Matches	2
Runs scored	67
Batting average	16.75
100s/50s	–/–
Top score	41
Balls bowled	48
Wickets	–
Bowling average	–
5 wickets in innings	–
10 wickets in match	–
Best bowling	–
Catches/stumpings	–/–
- Source: Cricinfo, 14 March 2010

Alfred John Wendt (1913–1996) was a Fijian cricketer.

Wendt was born in Levuka, Lomaiviti Province. He made his first-class debut for Fiji in 1948 against Wellington during Fiji's 1947/48 tour of New Zealand, where he played one first-class match during the tour against Canterbury. In his two first-class matches for Fiji he scored 67 runs at a batting average of 16.75, with a high score of 41.

Wendt also represented Fiji in six non first-class matches for Fiji on their 1947/48 tour of New Zealand, with his final match for Fiji coming against Bay of Plenty.
