= William Edmund Willoughby-Tottenham =

British military personnel (died 1962)

Member of the Legislative Council
- In office 1922–1923
- Preceded by: Herbert Valentine Tarte
- Succeeded by: Arthur Hallam Roberts
- Constituency: Vanua Levu & Taveuni
- In office 1926–1937
- Preceded by: Arthur Hallam Roberts
- Succeeded by: Seat abolished
- Constituency: Vanua Levu & Taveuni

Personal details
- Died: 22 August 1962 Suva, Fiji

Major William Edmund Willoughby-Tottenham (died 22 August 1962) was a British army major and later a politician in Fiji, where he served as a member of the Legislative Council in two spells between 1922 and 1937.

== Biography ==
Willoughby-Tottenham fought in both the Second Boer War and World War I. He moved to Fiji after World War I and became a planter in Savusavu. In 1920 he married Mabel Attenborough, who was later awarded an MBE for her work on social services.

After moving to Fiji, Willoughby-Tottenham successfully contested the Vanua Levu & Taveuni seat on the Legislative Council in a 1922 by-election. Although he was defeated by Arthur Hallam Roberts by two votes in the general elections the following year, he returned to the Legislative Council after winning the seat in the 1926 elections. He was subsequently re-elected in 1929 and 1932.

The Legislative Council was reorganised prior to the 1937 elections, with the number of elected European seats reduced from five to three. Willoughby-Tottenham ran in the Eastern constituency, but was defeated by Harold Brockett Gibson. He later unsuccessfully challenged Gibson in the 1940 and 1953 elections.

Outside politics, Willoughby-Tottenham was president of the Fijian St John Ambulance Association and owned the Hot Springs Hotel in Savusavu together with 210 acres of land. He later sold his holdings to Sathi Narain.

He died in Suva on 22 August 1962 at the age of 84.
