= Robert Crompton (politician) =

Lawyer and politician in Fiji

Robert Crompton, CBE, QC

Member of the Legislative Council
- In office 1914–1920
- Preceded by: James Burton Turner
- Succeeded by: Francis Riemenschneider
- Constituency: Southern

Personal details
- Born: 1869; Russian Empire
- Died: 19 December 1958; Christchurch, New Zealand
- Profession: Lawyer

Robert Crompton CBE QC (1869 – 19 December 1958) was a British lawyer and politician in Fiji. Alongside Henry Marks, John Maynard Hedstrom and Henry Milne Scott, he was one of the 'big four' that heavily influenced the Fijian economy and political sphere in the first half of the 20th century.

== Biography ==
Crompton was born in the Russian Empire in 1869 to an English father, and was educated at a Bluecoat school in Warrington. After qualifying as a lawyer, he moved to Fiji in 1904 and founded a law firm, going on to represent Hedstrom and Marks. He was also involved in several businesses, serving as a director of Morris Hedstrom. In 1914 elections he ran unopposed in the Southern constituency and was elected to the Legislative Council. He was made a CBE after World War I for raising funds and contingents to support the war effort. He was returned unopposed in the 1917 elections, but was defeated by Francis Riemenschneider in the 1920 elections. In 1924, he became a King's Counsel (Queen's Counsel from 6 February 1952), and later formed a legal partnership with his son Hollins under the name Cromptons. He served on the Executive Council in 1934, and again between 1941 and 1944.

His first wife Roseline Allen died in 1927; the couple had four children, Hollins, Robert, Rose and Ruve. Hollins and Rose both married into the Hedstrom family. Crompton subsequently married Thelma Sutherland in 1929. After she died in 1933, he married Vera Crawford the following year.

When Crompton retired, his son Robert took over the legal firm. He died in Christchurch, New Zealand on 19 December 1958.
