= Adolph Brewster =

British colonial administrator in Fiji

Official Member of the Legislative Council
- In office 1908–1910

Personal details
- Born: 1855 Melbourne, Victoria
- Died: October 1937 (aged 81–82) London, United Kingdom
- Profession: Colonial administrator

Adolph Brewster (1855 – October 1937) was a British colonial administrator in Fiji.

== Biography ==
Brewster was born Adolph Brewster Joske in Melbourne in 1854, the son of the businessman Paul Joske. He was educated in England, before returning to Victoria and becoming involved in a company negotiating with Cakobau of Fiji to obtain land to grow cotton in Fiji. Brewster moved to Fiji in 1870 to take over a plot of land in Suva district. He created a sugar plantation, and built the first sugar mill in the islands.

In 1884 Brewster joined the civil service. He reached the positions of Commissioner of Colo East and Colo North, as well as Deputy Commissioner of the Armed Native Constabulary. On 10 July 1902 he married Alice Caroline Stracey Tyler in St Stephen's Church in Bath whilst on a visit to England. In 1908 he was appointed to the Legislative Council by the Governor.

Brewster retired in 1910, after which he changed his name by deed poll, replacing his father's name with his mother's maiden name, Brewster. He retired to Bath, where he wrote two books, Hill Tribes of Fiji (1922) and King of the Cannibal Isles (1937). He died in London in October 1937. Alice lived until the age of 111; at the time of her death in 1982, she was the oldest person in the United Kingdom.
