= George Lynch-Staunton =

Canadian politician (1858–1940)

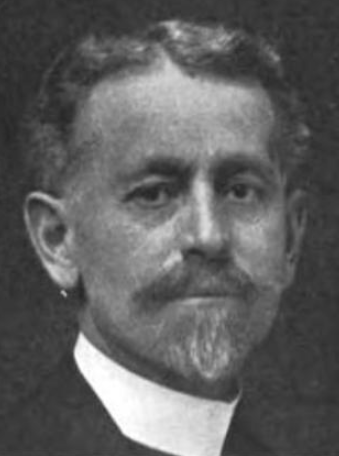

Canadian Senator from Ontario
- In office January 22, 1917 – March 19, 1940

Personal details
- Born: September 9, 1858 Southampton, Canada West
- Died: March 19, 1940 (aged 81) Hamilton, Ontario, Canada
- Party: Conservative
- Spouse: Adelaide Dewar (m. 1895)
- Education: St. Mary's College
- Occupation: Lawyer; politician

George Lynch-Staunton (September 9, 1858 – March 19, 1940) was a lawyer and member of the Senate of Canada.

== Biography ==
Lynch-Staunton was born in Southampton, Canada West (now Ontario) and was educated at St. Mary's College in Montreal as well as Upper Canada College in Toronto. He married Adelaide Dewar in 1895.

He became a lawyer based in Hamilton, Ontario and served as chairman of the Transcontinental Railway Investigation Commission from 1911 to 1913. He also was legal counsel to the government of Ontario in a number of cases. He was appointed to the Senate by Prime Minister Sir Robert Borden in January 1917 and sat as a Conservative. During the 1920s, he debated Hydro-Electric Power Commission of Ontario chairman Sir Adam Beck across Ontario on the subject of the Commission's acquisition and operation of intercity "radial" streetcar service.

He died in Hamilton on March 19, 1940.
