= George Lynch (journalist) =

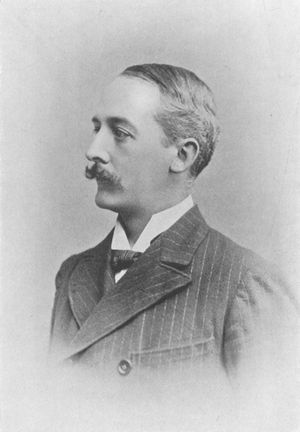
- Born: 27 March 1868; Cork, Ireland
- Died: 29 December 1928 (aged 60); West London, England
- Education: Catholic University of Ireland
- Occupations: Journalist, author
- Spouse: Carmela Lescher (m. 1902)

George Lynch (27 March 1868 – 29 December 1928) was an Irish journalist, author, explorer, war correspondent and inventor.

== Early life ==
George Lynch was born in Cork on 27 March 1868 and attended the secondary school, St. Vincent's Castleknock College, and then moved to England to attend The Oratory School, Edgbaston. He was later educated at the Catholic University of Ireland, in Dublin.

== Career ==
He began his career as an explorer looking at the Pacific Islands and Western Australia. He was later employed as a war correspondent by The Daily Chronicle reporting on the Spanish American War of 1898 and later at Collier's Weekly covering the Boer War.

In his book The War of the Civilizations: Being the Record of a Foreign Devil's Experiences with the Allies in China, Lynch remarked:

There are things that I must not write, and that may not be printed in England, which would seem to show that this Western civilisation of ours is merely a veneer over savagery. The actual truth has never been written about any war, and this will be no exception.

He also held several patents for war-related inventions.

== Works ==
- Lynch, George (1 June 2007). Impressions of a War Correspondent. Project Gutenberg.
- Lynch, George (1901). The War of the Civilizations: Being the Record of a Foreign Devil's Experiences with the Allies in China.
- Lynch, George (1903). The Path of Empire.
- Masuda, Takashi; Lynch, George (1908). Japan; its commercial development and prospects.
- Lynch, George (1916). War Wire.

=== Edited ===
- Hamilton, John Maxwell (1 October 2010). Lynch, George (ed.). In Many Wars, by Many War Correspondents (From Our Own Correspondent) (1st ed.). LSU Press. ISBN 978-0807137093.

== Personal life ==
Lynch married Carmela Lescher at St James's, Spanish Place on 18 October 1902. He knew James McNeill Whistler, the painter in the early 1890s.

== Death ==
Lynch died in his residence in West London on 29 December 1928.

== Legacy ==
His book The War of the Civilizations: Being the Record of a Foreign Devil's Experiences with the Allies in China was featured in a 2023 academic paper "A Book Series Recording Cultural Exchange between China and the West" published in 2023 and the book Reporting from the Front: War Reporters During the Great War published in 2014 by Brian Best.
