= Nadi District, Fiji =

Coordinates: 17°45′19″S 177°26′36″E

Nadi
- Tikina (District)
- Interactive map of Nadi
- Country: Fiji
- Province: Ba

Population (2017)
  - Total: 59,717

Nadi is a district within Ba Province, located on the south-west coast of the island of Viti Levu in Fiji.

Nadi is well known for its international airport, which long provided a communication link for travellers from North America to Australia and New Zealand. Because of its proximity to the airport and a number of uninhabited tropical islands, tourism is the main industry in the district. The district is served by the town of Nadi which has a population of approximately 12,000. In the rural areas of Nadi most farmers are involved in the sugar cane industry.
