= Ovalau =

Island in Fiji

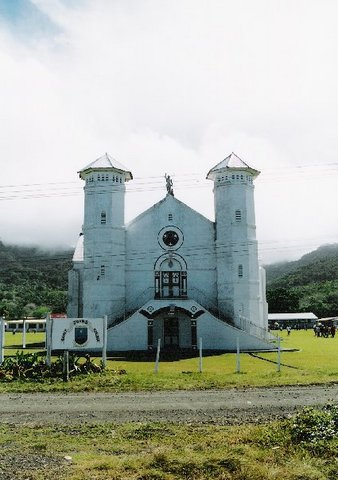
- St John's Church, Ovalau

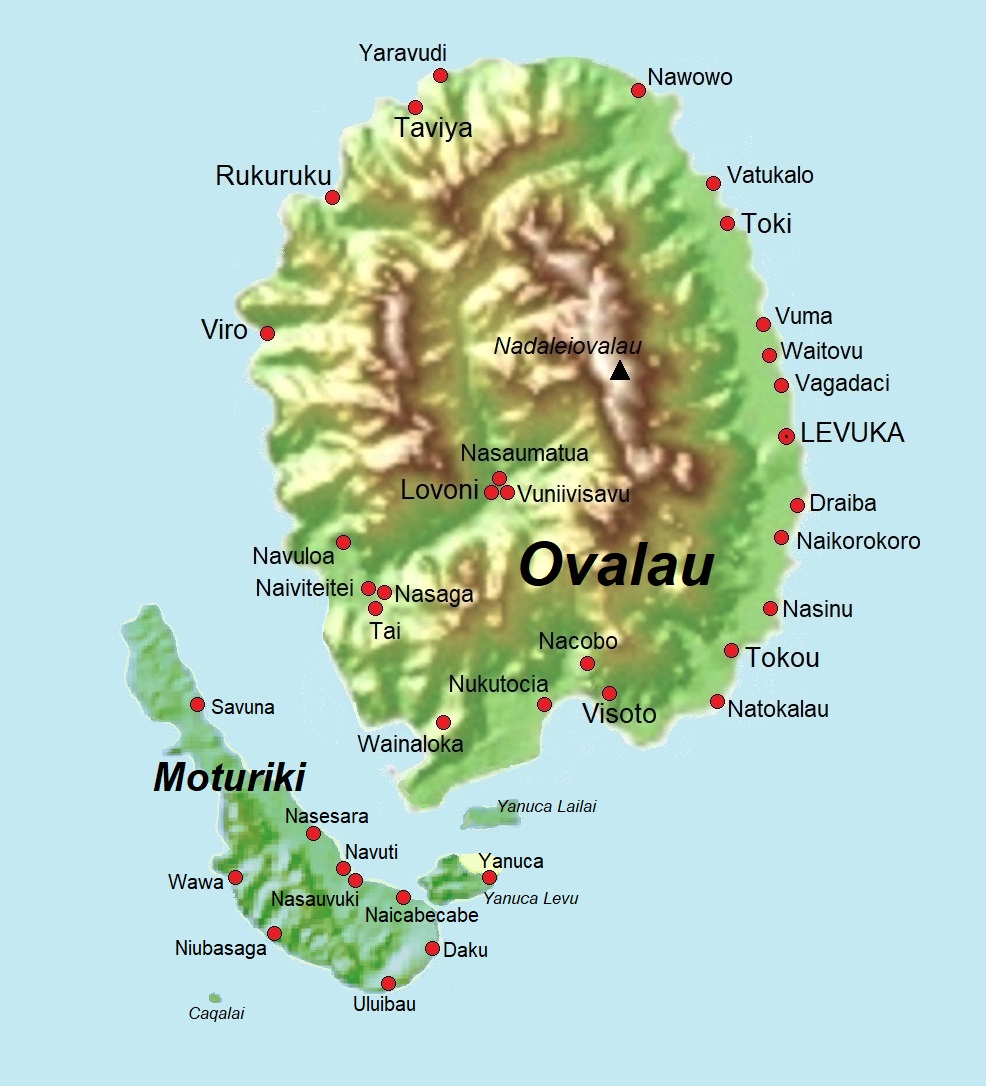
- Map of Ovalau Island

- Location in Fiji

Geography
- Location: Fiji
- Coordinates: 17°41′17″S 178°47′26″E
- Archipelago: Lomaiviti
- Adjacent to: Koro Sea
- Total islands: 1
- Major islands: 1
- Area: 106.4 km^{2} (41.1 sq mi)
- Area rank: 6th
- Length: 13.7 km (8.51 mi)
- Highest elevation: 626 m (2054 ft)

Administration
- Fiji
- Division: Eastern
- Province: Lomaiviti Province
- District: Ovalau
- Largest settlement: Levuka (pop. 1500)
- President: George Konrote

Demographics
- Demonym: Fijians
- Population: 8891 (2017) Census 2017
- Pop. density: 85.526/km^{2} (221.511/sq mi)
- Ethnic groups: Native Fijians, Indo-Fijians; other (Asian, Europeans, other Pacific Islander)

Ovalau (pronounced [oβaˈlau]) is the sixth largest island in Fiji. It is located in Lomaiviti Archipelago. Situated at 17.70° South and 178.8° East, (60 km north east from the national capital Suva and 20 km off the east coast of Viti Levu), the island is about 13 kilometers long and 10 kilometers wide. It covers a total area of 106.4 square kilometers and has a population of around 8,900 according to the census of 2017. Levuka, Fiji's former capital, is the largest place on the island, and is the only urban area in Lomaiviti.

Ovalau is characterized by its rugged topography, with little flat land apart from the Lovoni Valley in the centre of the island. The island is an eroded volcanic crater with a narrow belt of flat to undulating country between the encircling lagoon and the steep crater sides. The highest peaks are Nadelaiovalau, with an elevation of 625 meters, in the east, and Tomuna, 526 meters, in the south. Moturiki is just off the southwest coast of Ovalau. To the north-west is Naigani, and to the east is Wakaya.

== Administration and settlement ==
Ovalau has four administrative areas (tikina), which are divided into 23 traditional communities (koros) and the city of Levuka.

- Levuka (northern half of the island)
- Nasinu (southeast)
- Lovoni (center and south)
- Bureta (southwest)

Levuka includes the koros of Vagadaci (315), Waitovu (449, incl. Wailailai settlement), Vuma (211), Toki (194), Vatukalo (270), Nawowo (98), Yaravudi (161), Taviya (198), and Rukuruku (334).

Nasinu includes the koros of Nasinu (137), Naikorokoro (188, incl. Nasovo settlement), Tokou (442), Natokalau (398), and Draiba (202).

Lovoni includes the villages of Lovoni (196), Nacobo (279), Nukutocia (229), Visoto (252), and Vuniisavu (143).

Bureta includes the koros of Naiviteitei (75), Nasaga (151), and Navuloa (205, incl. Tivi settlement).

There are also the villages of Wainaloka (330), Viro (260), and Nasaumatua (117), as well as smaller settlements.

The population figures are from the 2017 census.

== Education ==
Eight villages—Toki, Taviya, Rukuruku, Viro, Nasaga, Visoto, Lovoni, and Tokou—are home to a primary school.

Secondary schools include St. John's College, Levuka Public School, and Delana Methodist School.

== Transport around Ovalau ==
There is one road which circles the island; it is about 50 km long. Levuka Airfield, which handles twice-daily Air Fiji flights to and from Nadi Airport is located on the west of the island, in the Bureta District, at the bank of the Bureta river. There is one flight in the morning, and one in the evening, with only the evening service operating on Sundays. Flights cost around FJ$150 return.

Ferry services also connect Ovalau to Viti Levu - the Patterson Brothers Shipping Company ferry company runs a service between Levuka, Buresala, Natovi, and Suva depending on the day.

Transport around the island is mainly by carrier. There is one bus service, which runs once daily from the west of Ovalau to Levuka in the morning, returns at 5pm, and is mainly used by schoolchildren and PAFCO workers.

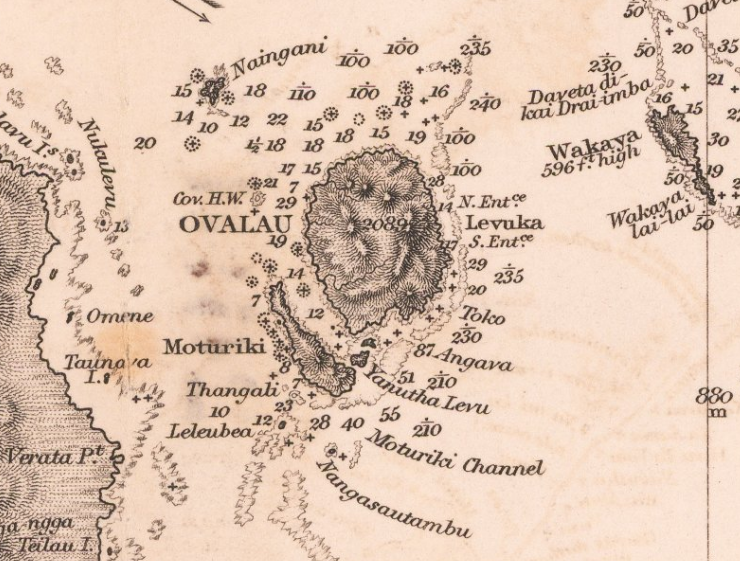
Ovalau and nearby islands in the 19th century, with the coast of Viti Levu in the west

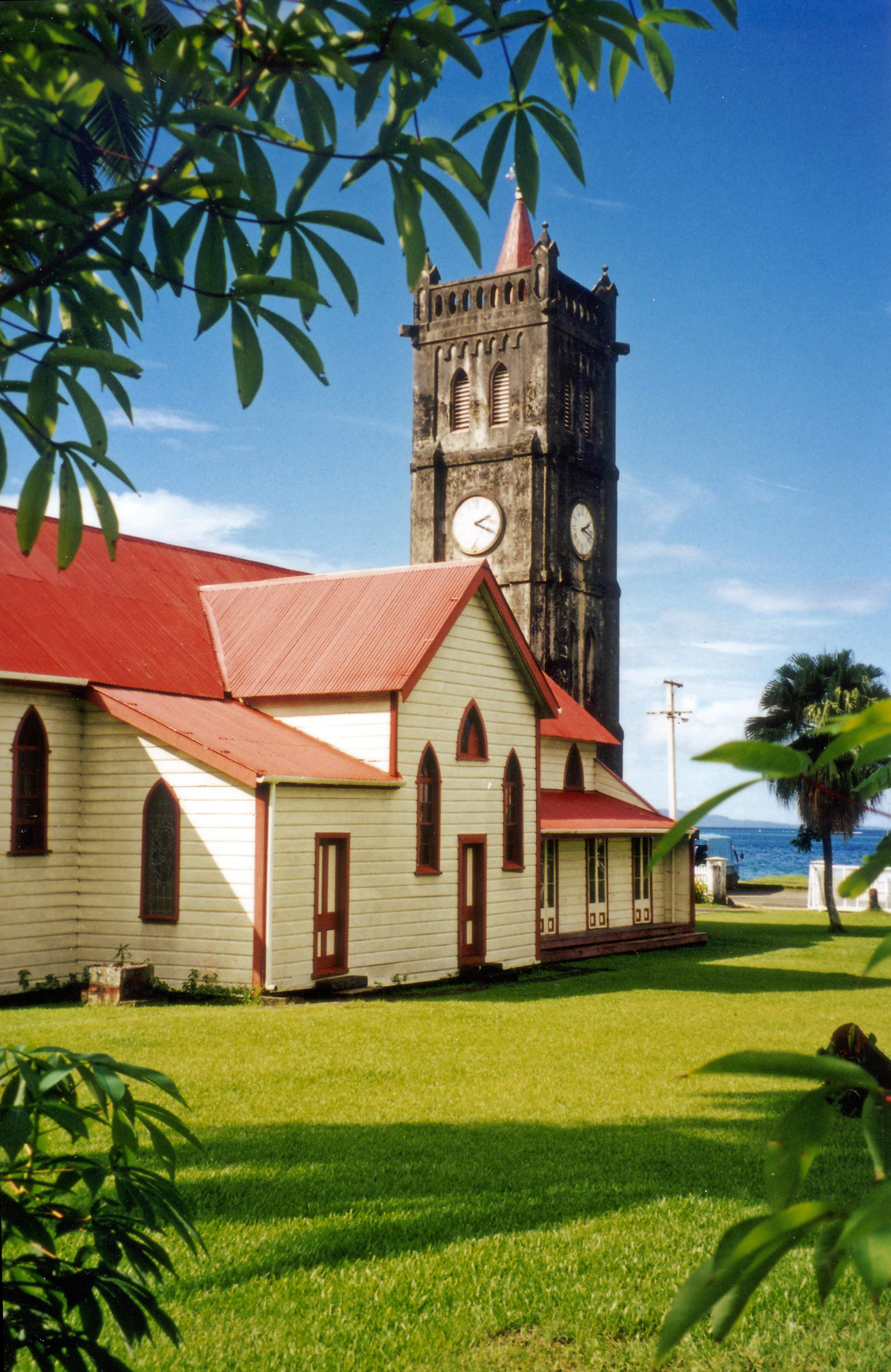
Sacred Heart Church, Levuka, Ovalau

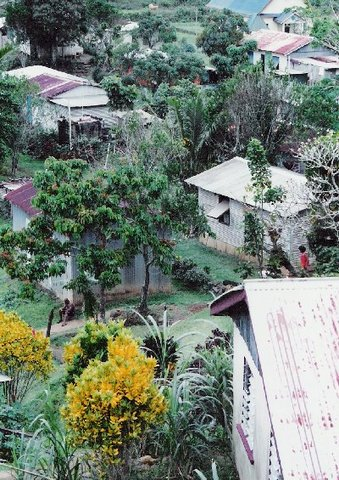
Lovoni Village, Ovalau

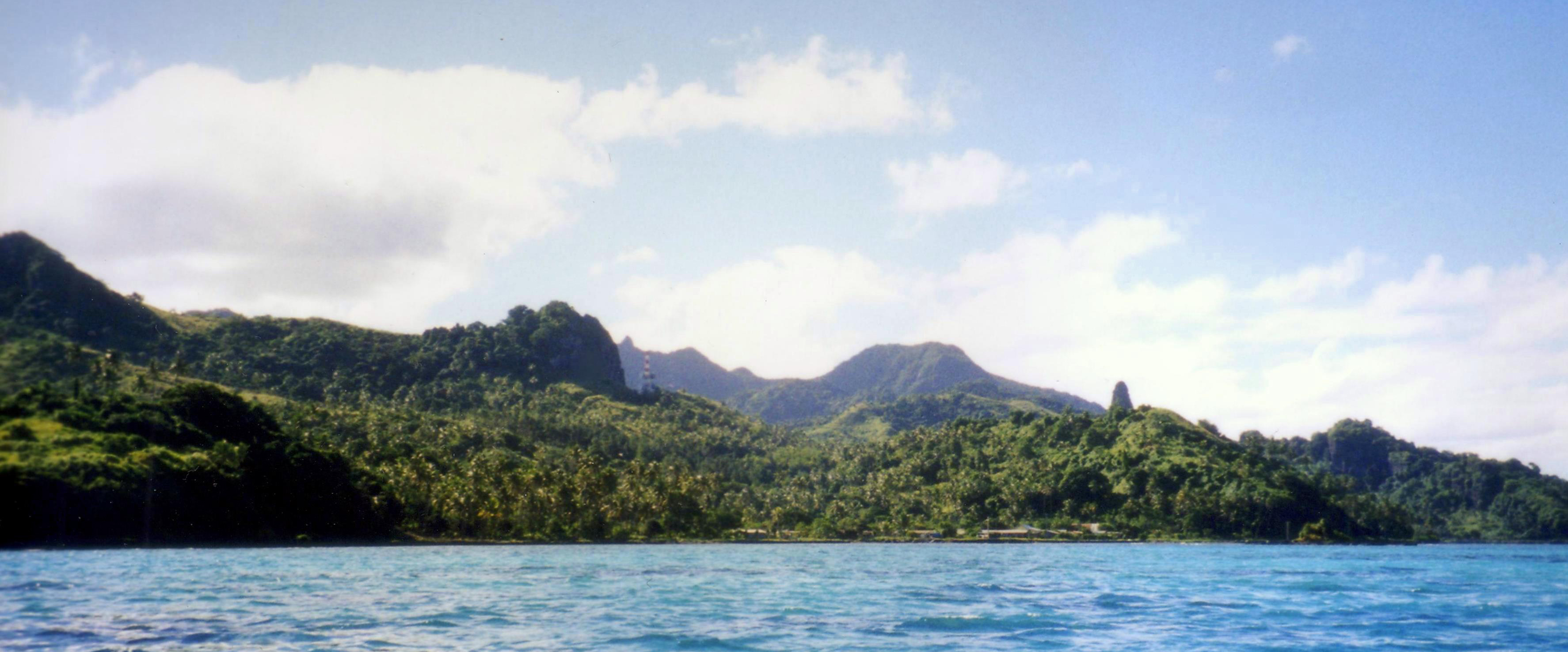
The south western side of Ovalau

== In popular culture ==
A fictionalized Ovalau appears in the 2013 tactical shooter video game Arma 3, specifically in the Arma 3: Apex downloadable content expansion pack, as the archipelago of "Tanoa", part of the island country of the "Horizon Islands Republic". In the game, the island itself is oriented sideways and includes a volcano. Moturiki is split into multiple islands, the barrier islands off the southeast coast are larger and now off the east coast, and additional islands have been added off the western and southern coasts.
