= George Lynch (Chief Medical Officer) =

British physician

Nominated Member of the Legislative Council
- In office 1903–1919

Chief Medical Officer
- In office 1908–1919

Personal details
- Born: 20 June 1861; London, United Kingdom
- Died: 22 March 1940 (aged 78)

Dr George William Augustus Lynch (20 June 1861 – 22 March 1940) was a British physician. He served as Chief Medical Officer in Fiji, and was a member of the colony's Legislative Council.

== Biography ==
Lynch was born on 20 June 1861 in London. His father, William Nicholas Lynch, was a barrister who worked at the Middle Temple in London and Georgetown in British Guiana. He attended Westminster School between 1875 and 1879, before studying at Caius College at the University of Cambridge and St Thomas' Hospital.

In 1890 he was appointed as a District Medical Officer in the town of Ba in Fiji, progressing to become Senior Medical Officer in 1898, and then Chief Medical Officer in 1908. He served as Head of the Fijian School of Medicine between 1907 and 1919.

In his role as Senior and Chief Medical Officer, he was also appointed to the Legislative Council in 1903, and also served in the Executive Council.

After retiring in 1919, he returned to the UK and settled in Aldeburgh, Suffolk, where he continued to practice. He died on 22 March 1940 at the age of 78.
