= Henry Milne Scott =

Fijian politician (1876–1956)

Member of the Legislative Council
- In office 1908–1929
- Constituency: Suva
- In office 1929–1937
- Constituency: Southern (European)

Personal details
- Born: 10 April 1876 Levuka, Fiji
- Died: 20 May 1956 (aged 80) Suva, Fiji
- Profession: Lawyer, businessman

Sir Henry Milne Scott KC (10 April 1876 – 20 May 1956) was a Fijian lawyer, businessman, politician and international cricketer. Alongside Robert Crompton, Henry Marks and John Maynard Hedstrom, he was one of the 'big four' that heavily influenced the Fijian economy and political sphere in the first half of the 20th century.

== Biography ==
Scott was born in Levuka on 10 April 1876. His father William Scott had originally emigrated to Fiji to be a cotton planter, before qualifying as a lawyer. In his late teens he made six first-class appearances for the Fiji cricket team during a tour of Australia, taking 11 wickets in six matches. He was subsequently captain of the Suva Cricket Eleven for many years.

When his father died in 1898, Scott took over his legal firm, having been called to the bar in 1899. In his legal role, he was also the colony's acting Attorney General several times. He was also heavily involved in businesses including the Colonial Sugar Refining Co and Burns Philp, and was President of the Suva Chamber of Commerce from 1908 until 1932.

In 1900 he married Nellie Weir Lindsay and went on to have four children, one of whom, Maurice Scott, also later served as a member of the Legislative Council. He became a King's Counsel in 1912, and was knighted in the 1928 New Year Honours.

=== Political career ===
In 1908 Scott was elected to the Legislative Council in the Suva constituency. He retained his seat until the 1929 elections, when he ran successfully in the new Southern constituency. He retained the Southern seat until stepping down at the 1937 elections when the number of elected Europeans was reduced from six to three. During his time in the Legislative Council, Scott was also a member of the Executive Council for several years.

Scott also served as mayor of Suva from 1916 until 1922; a street in the city was subsequently named for him.

=== Retirement ===
In retirement, Scott supervised the administration of the leper colony on Makogai. He died in Suva on 20 May 1956 at the age of 80.
