= Bua Province =

Province of Fiji

Coordinates: 16°46′34″S 178°36′04″E

- Province
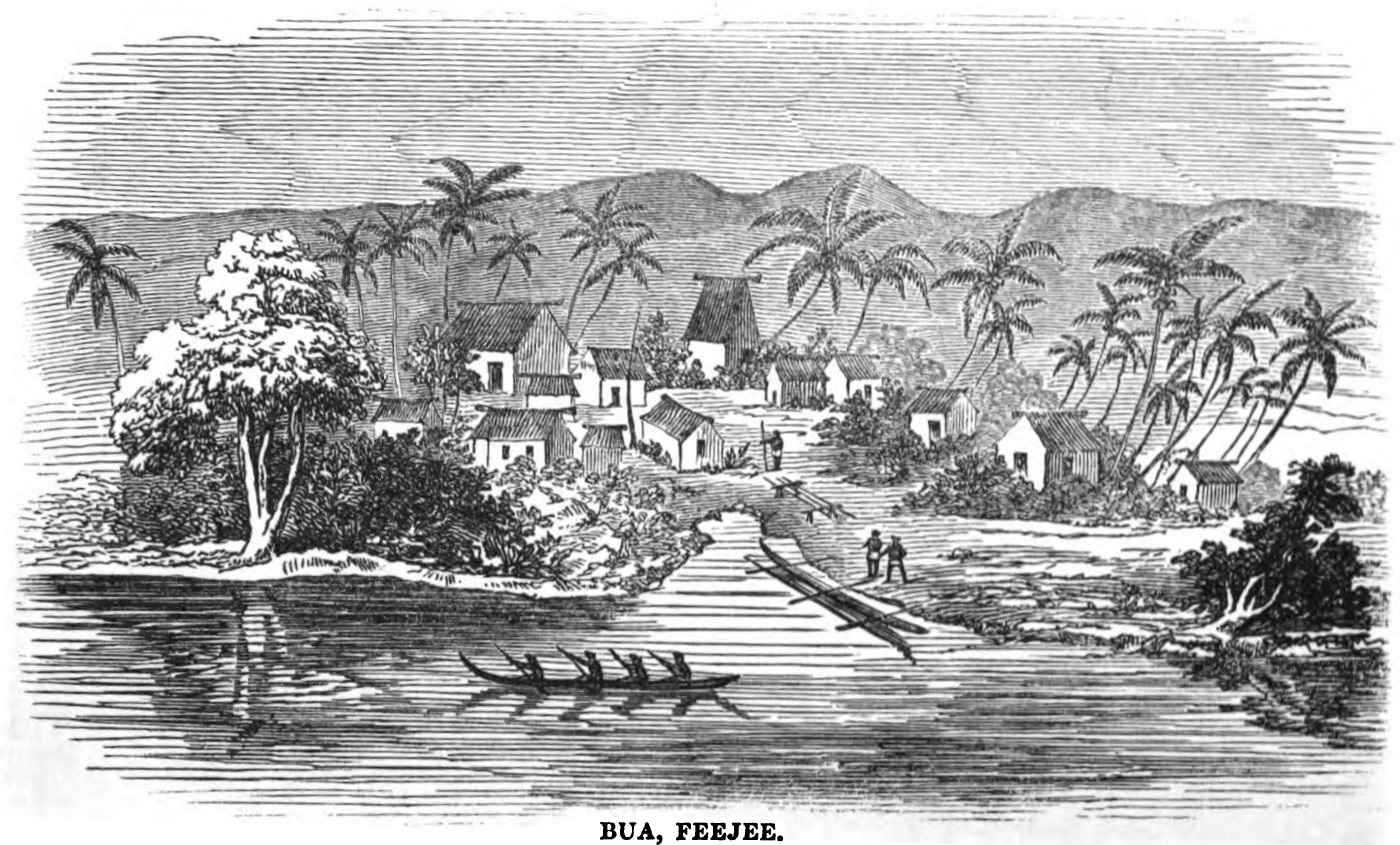
- Bua, Fiji Islands (June 1851, VIII, p.60)
- Interactive map of Bua Province
- Country: Fiji
- Division: Northern Division

Area
  - Total: 1,378 km^{2} (532 sq mi)

Population (2017)
  - Total: 15,489
  - Density: 11.24/km^{2} (29.11/sq mi)

Bua (Fijian pronunciation: [ᵐbu.a]) is one of fourteen provinces of Fiji. Located in the west of the northern island of Vanua Levu, it is one of three northern provinces, and has a land area of 1,379 square kilometers within the three main districts of Bua, Vuya and Wainunu.

Bua also is one of the port of entries into Vanua Levu. This port is located in Nabouwalu that is equipped with a jetty where ships berth. Fiji government is soon planning to declare Nabouwalu a township.

== Demographics ==
Its population at the 2017 census was 15,489, making it the fifth least-populous Province.

=== 2017 Census ===
Tikina (District)	Ethnicity						Total
Tikina (District)	iTaukei	%	Indo-Fijian	%	Other	%	Total
Bua	4,584	74.5	1,518	24.7	51	0.8	6,153
Vuya	4,584	94.6	220	4.5	40	0.8	4,844
Wainunu	4,048	90.1	42	0.9	402	8.9	4,492
Province	13,216	85.3	1,780	11.5	493	3.2	15,489

Bua is governed by a Provincial Council, chaired by Ratu Filimone Ralogaivau.

== Climate ==
Climate data for Nabouwalu, Bua Province (1991–2020 normals)
Month	Jan	Feb	Mar	Apr	May	Jun	Jul	Aug	Sep	Oct	Nov	Dec	Year
Mean daily maximum °C (°F)	30.8 (87.4)	31.0 (87.8)	31.0 (87.8)	30.0 (86.0)	28.5 (83.3)	27.6 (81.7)	27.0 (80.6)	26.8 (80.2)	27.4 (81.3)	28.2 (82.8)	29.3 (84.7)	30.3 (86.5)	29.0 (84.2)
Daily mean °C (°F)	27.7 (81.9)	27.9 (82.2)	27.9 (82.2)	27.2 (81.0)	26.1 (79.0)	25.3 (77.5)	24.7 (76.5)	24.4 (75.9)	24.9 (76.8)	25.6 (78.1)	26.5 (79.7)	27.3 (81.1)	26.3 (79.3)
Mean daily minimum °C (°F)	24.6 (76.3)	24.7 (76.5)	24.7 (76.5)	24.4 (75.9)	23.6 (74.5)	23.0 (73.4)	22.2 (72.0)	22.0 (71.6)	22.4 (72.3)	23.0 (73.4)	23.6 (74.5)	24.3 (75.7)	23.5 (74.3)
Average precipitation days (≥ 1.0 mm)	18.1	17.0	19.2	17.1	12.9	11.2	10.0	10.7	10.5	12.9	13.4	16.6	169.6
Source: World Meteorological Organization
