= Levuka =

Town in Ovalau, Fiji

Levuka लेवुका (Hindi)
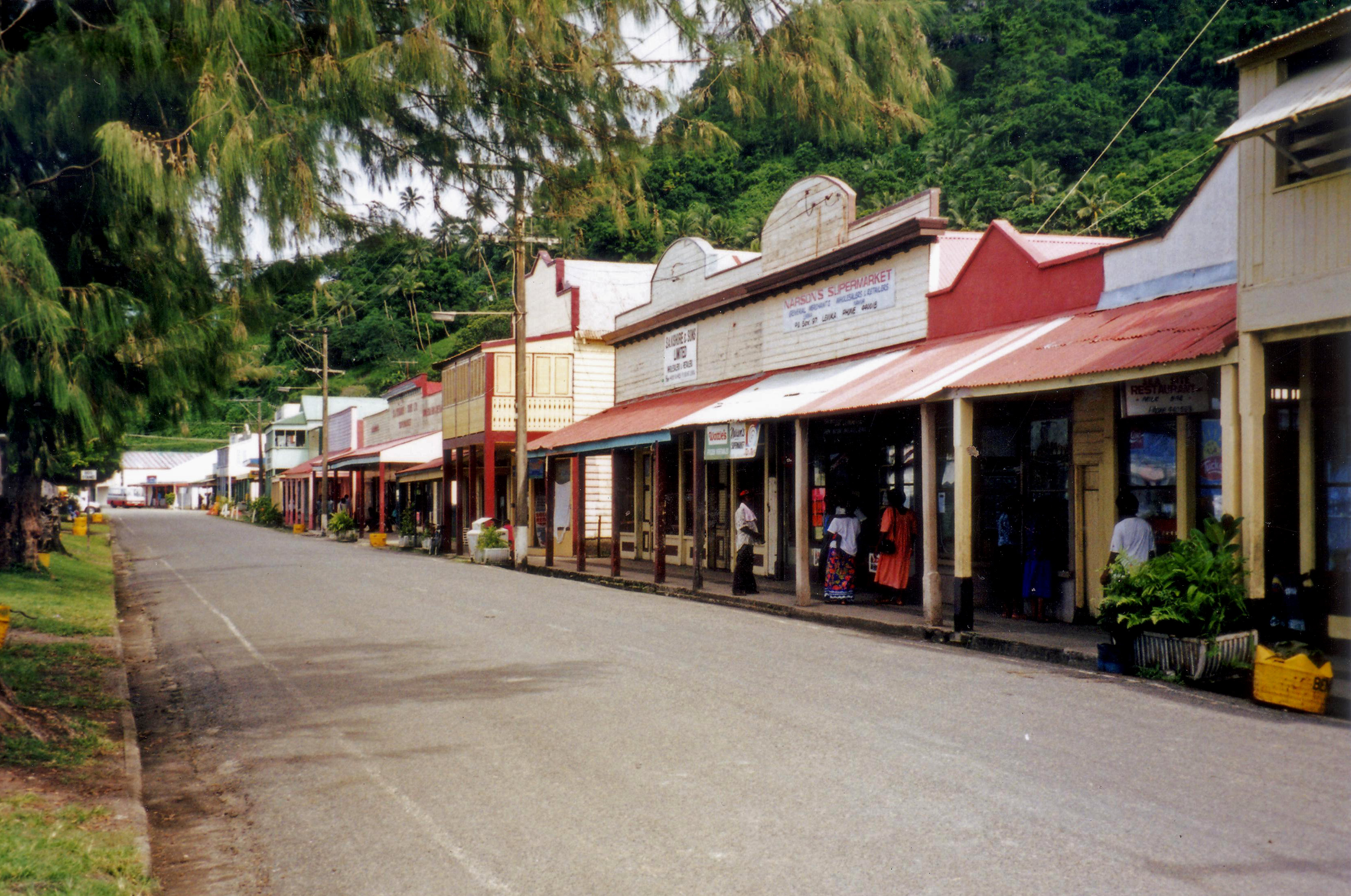
- Beach Street, Levuka

- Location in Fiji
- Coordinates: 17.684014°S 178.840127°E
- Country: Fiji
- Island: Ovalau
- Division: Eastern Division
- Province: Lomaiviti Province

Population (2007 Census)
  - City: 1,131
  - Urban: 4,397

UNESCO World Heritage Site
- Official name: Levuka Historical Port Town
- Type: Cultural
- Criteria: ii, iv
- Designated: 2013 (37th session)
- Reference no.: 1399
- Region: Asia and the Pacific

Levuka (Fijian pronunciation: [leβuka]) is a town on the eastern coast of the Fijian island of Ovalau, in Lomaiviti Province, in the Eastern Division of Fiji. Prior to 1877, it was the capital of Fiji. At the census in 2007, the last to date, Levuka town had a population of 1,131 (plus 3,266 living in the peri-urban area as defined by the Bureau of Statistics), about half of Ovalau's 8,900 inhabitants. It is the economic hub and the largest of 24 settlements on the island. Having been nominated decades prior, Levuka was designated a UNESCO World Heritage Site in June 2013, in recognition of the port town's exceptional testimony to the late colonial port towns in the Pacific.

== History ==
The modern town of Levuka was founded around 1820 by European settlers and traders as the first modern town in the Fiji Islands, and became an important port and trading post. A disparate band of settlers made up Levuka's population – traders, missionaries, shipwrights, speculators, and vagabonds, as well as respectable businessmen. The US Exploring Expedition visited in 1840.

During the mid-19th century, the town was quickly becoming a commercial hub for the sea cucumber trade. Marist priests, led by Father Jean-Baptiste Bréhéret, established a mission in Levuka in 1858, and Wesleyan missions were built around the same time. The Sacred Heart Church, Marist Convent School, and two Methodist churches still survive today. By 1870, the town had a population of more than 2000. When the first modern nation state of Fiji, the Kingdom of Fiji, was founded in 1871, Seru Epenisa Cakobau was crowned King at Levuka. After Fiji was annexed as a British colony in 1874, Levuka remained the capital until 1877, when the administration was moved to Suva, although the move was not made official until 1882. The move was prompted by concerns that the 600-meter high hills, many with cliffs, surrounding Levuka gave it no room for expansion.

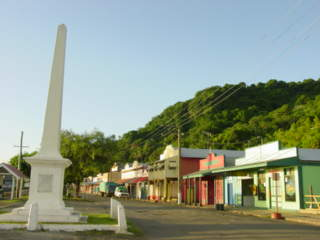
Beach Street, Levuka, Fiji

Levuka is famous for many of Fiji's "firsts". It was the site of Fiji's first bank, post office, school, private members club, hospital, town hall, and municipal government. Fiji's first newspaper, the Fiji Times, which is still in operation today, was founded in Levuka in 1869. Levuka's Royal Hotel is the oldest hotel in the South Pacific still operating. Historians have not ascertained its exact age, but records show that it was in existence by the early 1860s. Levuka Public School, opened in 1879, was the first public school in Fiji and many of Fiji's leaders in the years leading up to and following independence in 1970 were educated there. The oldest Masonic lodge in the South Pacific, Lodge Polynesia 562 SC, is also to be found in Levuka. It was established in 1875. Levuka was also the site of Fiji's first public electricity system, which began in 1927, three days before the capital Suva was electrified.

=== Arson ===
Much of Levuka's unique heritage is in its wooden architecture which is highly vulnerable to fire. The Masonic Lodge, Levuka's only Romanesque-revival building was set on fire during the period of lawlessness and unrest following Fiji's 2000 coup. There is much controversy about the Masonic fraternity in Fiji, the dominant traditional Christian faiths consider Masons to be devil-worshippers. The Lodge contained priceless historical artefacts and records of Levuka's history dating back to 1875. The arsonists have yet to be identified and prosecuted.

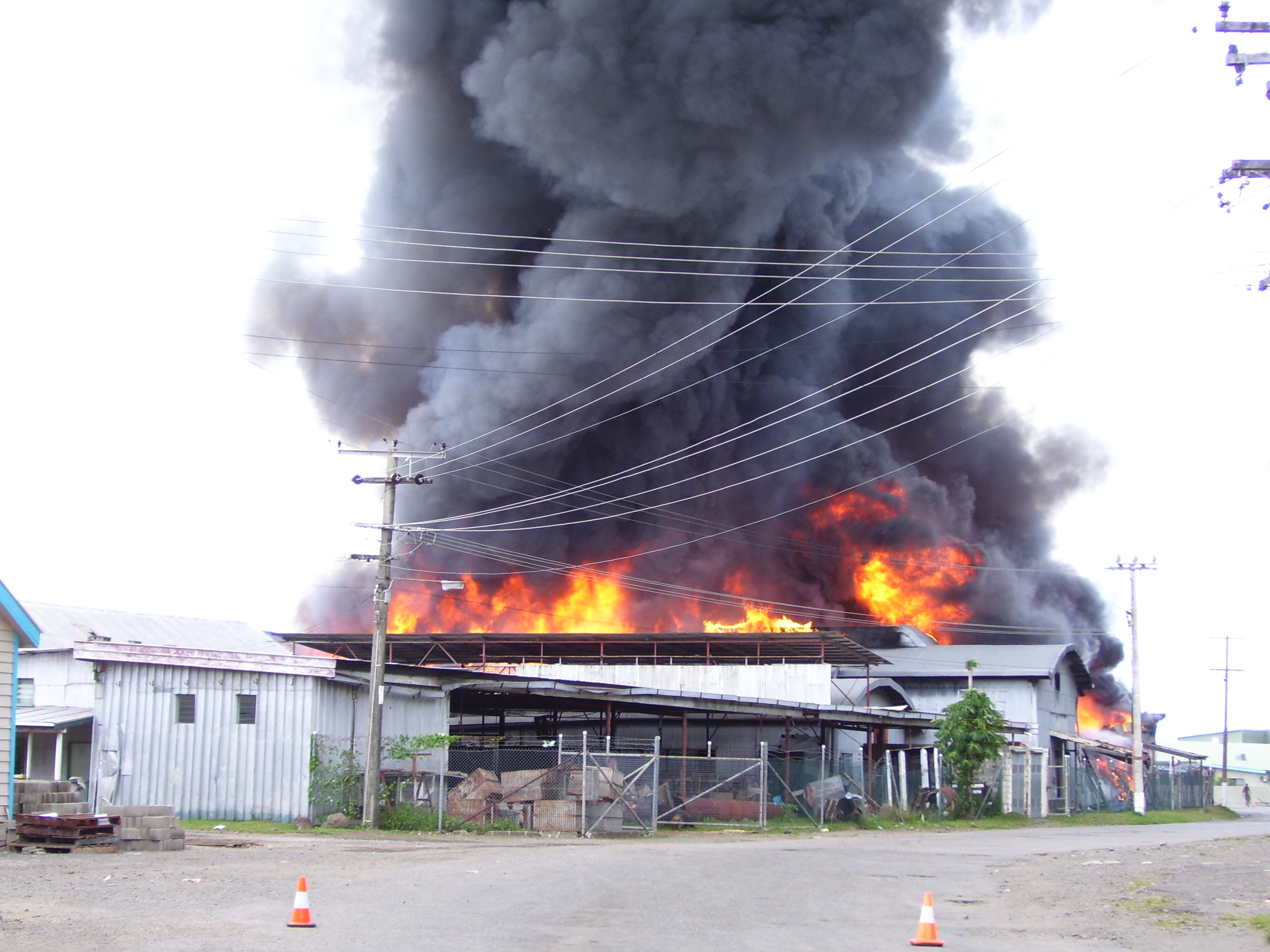
Fire destroys Pafco's Freezer Plant

In 2008, Levuka's PAFCO Cold Storage Plant which was located next the town's main road was destroyed by a fire caused during welding maintenance works. In more recent years, the old Mavida Guest house and the old General Store on Levuka's main street have also burnt down. The General Store Building housed the Westpac Bank, Air Fiji and a Supermarket and, being over 100 years old, was part of the then proposed (now established) UNESCO National Heritage Site. Rumors of arson abound in relation to the fires but no prosecutions have been made. In April 2010, Levuka's Chief Fire Authority Officer was quoted in the national paper as saying that Levuka is: ‘...a fire hazard waiting to happen...’, he points out in the article that there are no fire hydrants in the town and that virtually no buildings have fire extinguishers or fire alarm systems.

== Economy ==
Levuka's status as a stopover port for ocean vessels crossing the Pacific came to an end in the 1950s, threatening the town with economic extinction. In 1964, however, the Pacific Fishing Company (PAFCO) was founded by a Japanese firm, specialising in freezing and shipping canned tuna, mostly to markets in Europe and Canada. A cannery, a joint PAFCO-government venture, was opened in 1976, and is the largest private employer on the island of Ovalau. Owing largely to Levuka's isolation, tourism plays only a minor role in the Levuka/Ovalau economy.

== Governance and politics ==
Levuka has been incorporated as a Town since 1877, and is governed by a Town Council of 8 members, elected for 3-year terms. The municipal elections of 22 October 2005 resulted in a defeat for the SDL of outgoing Mayor Taniela Bulivou, with the Balance Party taking 6 of the 8 seats. The new council elected George Gibson to succeed Bulivou; the Mayoral term is for one year, but may be extended any number of times. The council has recently been suspended by the interim government of Fiji and a local administrator (Napolionio Masirewa) has been named.

== Landmarks ==
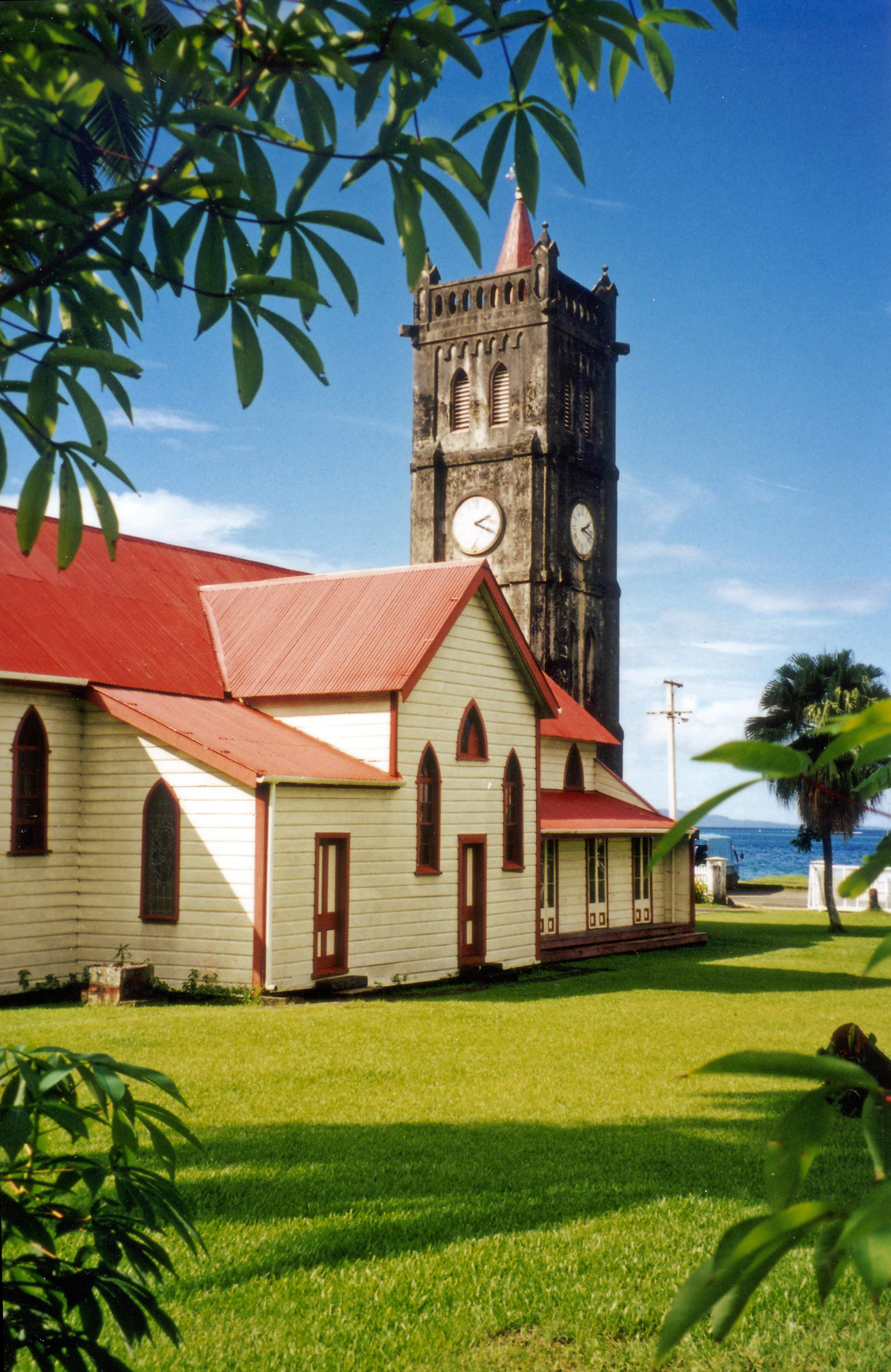
Sacred Heart Church, Beach Street

At the northern end of Levuka is the traditional Fijian village of Levuka. The village chief, who bears the title of Tui Levuka, is a direct descendant of the chief who welcomed the first European settlers. In memory of his ancestor, he is also known as "Tamana na vavalagi" (Father of the Europeans). At the southern end of the town lies the village of Nasova, where the King Seru Epenisa Cakobau signed the Deed of Cession, ceding the islands to Great Britain on 10 October 1874.

The Levuka Community Centre, which houses a branch of the Fiji Museum, a public library, crafts centre, kindergarten, squash court and meeting hall, occupies a renovated store built in 1878 by Morris Hedstrom, a trading company established in Levuka's early days and still in business in Fiji. Morris Hedstrom gave the building to the National Trust of Fiji in 1980. Adjacent to the Levuka Community Centre stands Queens Wharf, with a maximum depth of eight meters. Upgraded in the 1990s, it is used mostly by local craft, though foreign vessels sometimes dock, Levuka being one of three official ports of entry to Fiji (Suva and Lautoka being the other two).

Other well-known landmarks include Sacred Heart Church, a legacy of the Marist Fathers, who arrived in 1858, the Ovalau Club, one of the oldest social organisations in the Pacific, and Levuka Town Hall, which houses the Levuka Town Council. It was built in 1898 in honour of Queen Victoria's Diamond Jubilee.

== Notable people ==
- Hereward Kesteven – Australian medical scientist
- Graeme Leung – lawyer and former Fiji Law Society president
- Maria Liku – Olympic weightlifter
- John Maynard Hedstrom – Legislative Council member and founder of Morris Hedstrom
- Katharine Susannah Prichard – Australian novelist and Communist Party of Australia charter member; born in Levuka December 1883
- Dave Solomon – rugby union player
- Manueli Tulo – Olympic weightlifter
- Josefa Vueti - Olympic weightlifter
- Alfred Wendt – cricketer
- Ratu Josefa Celua died in Levuka
- Eileen Cikamatana - weightlifter who a gold medal for Fiji in the 2018 Commonwealth Games.
