= Battle of Malolo =

Punitive expedition of the United States

- Part of United States Exploring Expedition, the 1840 Fiji expedition, and the Fiji expeditions
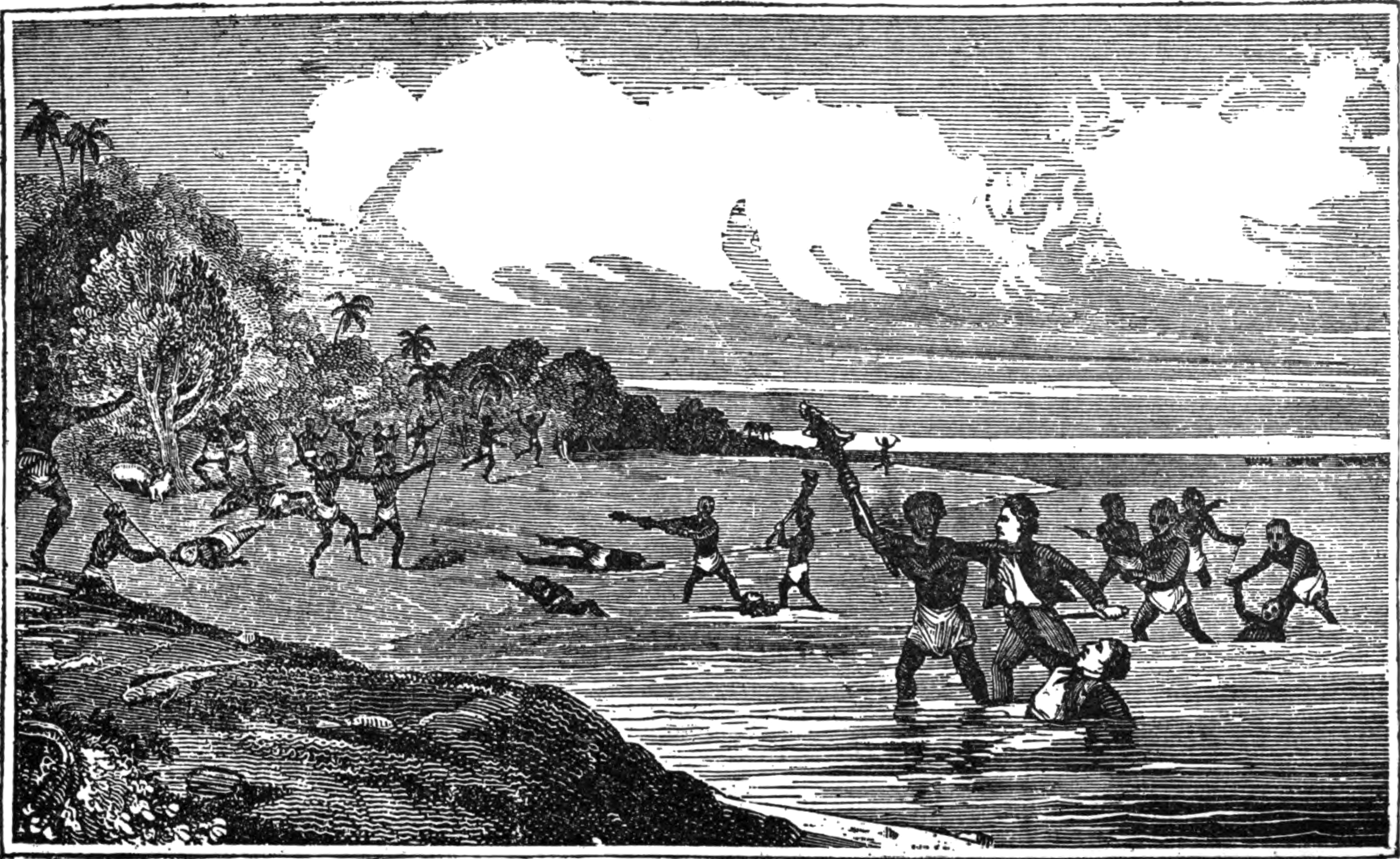
Date	July 24–25, 1840
Location	Sualib and Arro villages, Malolo Island, Mamanuca Islands, Fiji
Result	United States victory: Deaths of U.S. Sailors avenged; Enemy chief killed; Sualib and Arro villages destroyed; Survivors of Sualib and Arro surrender; Reparations received by the expedition

Belligerents
United States	Fijians

Commanders and leaders
Charles Wilkes	† Unknown Fijian Chief

Strength
Land: 70 men at least 1 Fijian scout Sea: Several boats, 1 U.S. Schooner, and 1 U.S. brig	Land: Unknown (Over 100) (Note: It is unclear whether or not women were counted as combatants for numbering purposes, although a number of them did fight during the engagement at Sualib.) Sea: Unknown number of Canoes

Casualties and losses
Military: 2 Dead Several Injured	Military: 74–104 dead (Note: There are at least 3 known estimates for the casualties at Sualib. These are 57, 80, and 87. Again it is unclear if women were counted as combatants, and of those who were killed which ones were fighting with their men and which ones were trying to avoid danger. Moreover most of the bodies were burned when the village caught fire and the Americans evacuated to safety, which makes the casualty count more difficult to estimate. Combining the casualties at Sualib together with the engagement on the 24th, the boat battles, and the bayonetting of the man in between Sualib and Arro, there were at least 17 deaths. For the final engagement which was a boat battle the witnesses state that several were killed, but did not give an estimate. So if you add the 57 to 17 you get 74, if you add 80 to 17 we you 97, and if you add 87 to 17 you get 104.) Unknown injured Civilian: At least 1 child (Note: According to one report, Henry Eld ordered his men to avoid shooting near the child and attempted to grab her and pull her to safety. However, the heat from the fire was too intense for Eld and he retreated. Later, it was found that the child had died as a result of collateral damage due to either fire or smoke inhalation. There may have other civilian casualties during the battle, but the sources have not specified any specifically.) Unknown injured

The Battle of Malolo also called the Massacre of Malolo, was the second of two punitive expeditions that occurred during the 1840 Fiji expedition of the overall United States Exploring Expedition (a.k.a. the Wilkes Expedition or the Ex. Ex.) between the United States Navy and Marine Corps vs the aforementioned Fijian villages. The catalyst was the firing of a gun amidst negotiations for food between Lieutenant Joseph Underwood and the unnamed Fijian chief of Sualib village located on Malolo island. After the gun was fired Underwood and passed midshipman Wilkes Henry (the Nephew of the Ex. Ex.'s commander Lieutenant Charles Wilkes), were both killed along with ten natives in the opening skirmish for the two day battle. Wilkes had the men buried and the next day Wilkes launched a counter attack that saw the villages of Sualib and the associated village of Arro destroyed along with much of the hinterland and populace of the villages.

== Background ==
=== Background of the 1st Fijian Expedition ===
The Ex. Ex. under the command of Lieutenant Charles Wilkes had just discovered that Antarctica was a continent, and finished surveying Wilkes Land. Now that the Antarctic discoveries were finished, Wilkes' fleet traveled to Sydney, Australia, then to the Bay of Islands, New Zealand, and finally they rendezvoused at Tongatapu, in Tonga, and prepared for their next mission in Fiji.

Fiji was of interest to the United States in that New England merchants and whalers frequented Fiji for its whale and sandalwood, and competed with the British and the French for the bêche-de-mer populations to sell in China. However, Fiji possessed many uncharted reefs, rocks, and currents, with a culture well known for its cannibalism and a noted penchant for dragging boats to shore and killing all on board. No dependable navigation charts existed, and in the 12 years prior to 1840 8 ships (5 of them being American) had been destroyed in the area. These condition made travel to and around these Islands so precarious, that the East India Marine Society of Salem, Massachusetts, had petitioned the federal government for local charts for sailors navigating these waters.

By the time of Wilkes arrival in Fiji on May 4, 1840, Wilkes had already had his four ships furnished at Sydney. His current fleet at the time of the Fiji expedition consisted of Wilkes' flagship the USS Vincennes (sloop-of-war, 780 tons, 18 guns), the USS Peacock (sloop-of-war, 650 tons, 22 guns), the USS Porpoise (brig, 230 tons, 10 guns), and the USS Flying Fish (schooner, 96 tons, 2 guns).

Wilkes' fleet set sail out of Nukuʻalofa on May 4 of that year. He dispatched the Porpoise under Lieutenant Cadwalader Ringgold to the Lau Group of the Fiji Islands, while the rest of the fleet went to the Koro Sea. The 3 ships headed for the Island of Ovalau, but by the morning of May 7, the Flying Fish under the command of Lieutenant George Sinclair went missing, after it got caught on a reef. Wilkes pressed on with the Peacock and the Vincennes and anchored by the village Levuka, and from their began their work of surveying the islands.

=== Background of the Battle of Malolo ===
Previously on July 12, Wilkes launched an attack and burned down the villages of Solevu and Tye in a retaliatory action after members of Solevu village had stolen one of the expeditions boats. Following the burning, the Ex. Ex. soon moved on from Solevu to the Mamanuca Islands to continue their survey mission, while the Vincennes and Peacock deployed to Muthuata Island. David Whippey a hired beachcomber and translator, informed Wilkes that this set of islands was particularly notorious for being perilous to westerners, as the residents of Malolo were noted for being pirates and the worst offenders of attacking foreigners. Wilkes acknowledged the danger and made sure his boats were grouped together and well escorted. He deployed 3 boats and the Porpoise and Flying Fish for this mission. The boats were led by Lieutenants James Alden Jr., George F. Emmons, and Joseph Underwood.

On July 22 the squadron reached Drawaqa Island at the southern most end of the Yasawa Islands. (Note: Wilkes named this Eld Island for the survey, but today it is called Drawaqa Island.) Wilkes divided his squadron. He sent 2 boats led by Alden and Underwood to the middle of the Mamanucas, the Porpoise took the Western side, and the Flying Fish and Emmons' cutter took the Western end. The goal was for all 3 groups to complete their surveying that day and then assemble together at Malolo Island the next day.

On July 24, Alden and Underwood finished their surveying without issue, and anchored on the east side of Malolo next to Malolo Lailai for the night. In the morning Underwood and Alden noticed the Flying Fish and Emmons boat anchored in the distant East along Malolo. An hour later, Emmons boat approached Underwood and Alden's. They inquired for food, but Emmons regrettably told them that the Flying Fish was entirely bereft of anymore supplies. This distressed the officers as only a few days ago Wilkes had cut the food rations by a third due to low provision levels, and currently Underwood and Alden's men only had a few yams with them. It was decided to try and trade with the local natives for food.

Underwood encountered a Fijian boy chief in the area, who was carrying war clubs which struck him as menacing, and so arrested him. Later, he found a group of local natives and through a Māori interpreter named John Sac, Underwood negotiated for food. Underwood was able to negotiate a tentative deal between himself and the natives. The village of Malolo was on the Southwest part of the island and the natives proposed making an exchange for a few hogs. However, in order to get them Underwood would have to accompany the natives and one of the boats would have to sail to the Southwestern part of the island to pick them up. It turned out that the local chief's son was the man that Underwood had captured. In light of this, Underwood agreed to travel with the natives to their village provided that the chiefs son stay with his boat as a captive and guarantee of Underwood's safety, and would be released when business was concluded. (Note: The practice of taking a hostage when negotiating with Fijians is implied by Wilkes to have been common between Westerners and Fijians at the time.)

Underwood used his own boat (the Leopard) as it was smaller than Alden and Emmons cutters and could more easily go over the shallows without getting trapped. He left all but 3 of his muskets with the Porpoise in order to further reduce weight and increase the ease of travel. This was actually against the standing orders that Wilkes had laid out for safety, but Underwood did not believe that the Fijians were as dangerous as was commonly supposed. Underwood brought Sac with him to translate, along with 6 other men. The rest of the men stayed with the Leopard (commanded by Alden) and their hostage on the beach.

Underwood met a group of natives near the village by a tree. The tree had many throwing and maiming clubs tied to the branches, and two thin hogs next to it. Underwood tried to barter for the swine, but he was informed that no transaction could be made without the chiefs approval. After half an hour the chief appeared after returning from a fishing trip. The Chief demanded a musket with ammo and powder in exchange for the hogs.

Meanwhile, Alden and his men had waited in their boat a short distance from the shore, however their men were becoming agitated. The tide was coming in and Alden didn't trust the natives as much as Underwood did. A messenger soon came from Underwood giving him an update of the situation. Alden sent a message to Underwood to stop negotiating and return to the ship. He sent Wilkes' Nephew Midshipman Wilkes Henry (who was named after his Uncle), to deliver the message. Soon after, a Canoe came up alongside the Leopard and began talking to the chief's son. The Fijian attempted to get out of the boat, but Aden pulled him down. Another half an hour passed, and negotiations seemed to be progressing. Another messenger from Underwood informed Alden that the chief wanted a hatchet and then the hogs would go to the sailors. Alden gave the man the hatchet and he ran to give it to Underwood.

Not long after Emmons arrived in one of the cutters. He and his crew had been looking for an area to eat the pigs at the nearby Malolo Lailai island, and began discussing it with Alden. Alden was sharing with Emmons his anxieties over the negotiations and the chief's son's attempted escape, when the native leaped out of the boat and made for the opposite direction from the village. Alden ordered one of his men to shoot over the chief's head to entice him to return.

== Battle ==
=== The Killing of Lieutenant Underwood and Midshipman Wilkes Henry ===
Accounts differ as to what happened next, however when the shot went off. Alden and Emmons claimed that the chief's son's escape attempt was a signal for the natives to attack. While those who were negotiating with the chief claimed that the attack began after the shot was fired. Either way, the chief shouted that he thought that the sailors on the beach had killed his son, and ordered an assault. 2 Fijians grabbed the musket of one of Underwood's men, named Joseph Clark. Clark gripped the musket and then brandished a knife. He stabbed one native and then bashed another with the muskets' shoulder stock. Then, several natives began spilling out of the mangrove bushes. Underwood's men began to fire their muskets as they retreated to the two boats.

About 100 natives began to give chase to the men retreating on the beach and threw spears and throwing clubs at their enemy. Wilkes Henry and Underwood covered the retreat. Henry was hit by a club and then shot the man who threw it at him. Then another native hit him in the back of the head. Henry collapsed to the ground with his face in the water, was surrounded by natives, and then stripped. Joseph Clark was hit by a glancing blow in the mouth and the spear landed in Underwood's left arm. Clark shot the man who threw the spear in the head and then another native knocked Clark out with a club. He fell into the water, but the pain from the salt water on his bloody face soon woke him. Clark stood up and witnessed Underwood being clubbed in the back of the head. Clark attempted to drag Underwood to safety with one arm, and hit away other natives with his other. Then Clark was hit twice more and fell down. He got back up when he noticed another native was about to club the unconscious Underwood and stabbed him repeatedly. Clark grabbed Underwood again who briefly came to and told him to tell his wife he loved her. Then Underwood had his head clubbed in and died. Clark was left in a state of shock and delirium. He got up and limped to the rest of the escaping sailors. Clark's face was covered in blood and dangling flesh and in his absent minded state, he laughed and sang at the natives. The natives were perplexed by Clark's actions and stayed clear of him for the rest of the engagement.Besides Clark, all the men who retreated back to the beach that survived suffered injuries.

When Aldan and Emmons saw the fighting on the beach their crews began to row for the shore. Once the other retreating men had assembled at the boats with Alden and Emmons, Alden a handful of men went back to look for Underwood and Henry. They encountered Clark in his delusional state and sent him back to the boats. The natives had retreated back to their village. Then Alden and his men found the bodies of both of Underwood and Henry almost completely naked. Underwood's face was smashed beyond recognition. As for Henry, aside from the bruising and his nudity, Henry looked unharmed, but his mourners soon realized that Henry had drowned while unconscious.

On the beach, there lay the bodies of ten Fijians from the attack. One of them stirred and was still alive, and in a fit of fury and vengeance the men, shot and stabbed him several times, before cutting off his head. A number of the men wanted to pursue the natives back to their village. But, there were less than two dozen men, and the natives could return at any moment and overwhelm them. Alden commanded the men make a swift retreat back to the rest of the expedition. The bodies of Henry and Underwood were gingerly placed in the cutter and covered in jackets to uphold their dignity, and the 2 boats sailed back to the Flying Fish.

Once the bodies were brought on board they were placed in the ships port side and covered with a tarp. Wilkes wept bitterly for his nephew. He knelt and kissed him. He called Underwood a "poor fellow". The cadavers were stitched into hammocks, draped in flags, buried on a nearby small island, and hidden out of fear that the natives would dig up and cannibalize the bodies. Wilkes named the Island Henry Island after his Nephew (not to be confused with Henry Island (Washington), which he also named after his Nephew later in the expedition).

=== Prelude to the main battle ===
That night (July 24) Wilkes set up boat patrols commanded by Alden, Emmons, and passed midshipman Henry Eld around Malolo to ensure no native escaped. It became evident that the natives also expected a counter attack. Fijians in full war paint and equipped with muskets were scattered around the shoreline and would fire pot shots at the boat crews. The crews would occasionally fire back, but the natives would take cover and drop prone before a musket ball could hit them.

In the morning of July 25. Wilkes sent a force of about 70 men and a Fijian scout in 3 divisions. The force was commanded by Lieutenant Ringgold; they landed in Southern Malolo. Wilkes gave orders to kill all men and burn the village, but "spare only the women and the children.". From there the men began marching to the fortified village of Sualib just outside of where Underwood and Henry were killed. The Flying Fish and Porpoise waited on the coast with their cannons fixed on the shore. The Flying Fish was originally going to lead the boats into battle, but it grounded on a sandbar.

In the meantime Wilkes organized a small fleet of gigs, cutters, and whaleboats supplied with forward mounted blunderbusses, and a number of them were furnished with Congreve rocket artillery frames. The boats were commanded by Alden, Emmons, and Clark whose mission was to search and destroy all hostile escaping canoes. There other objective was to approach the smaller Arro (sometimes called Yaro) village and neutralize, it while Ringgold's force would destroy Sualib and link up with Wilkes flotilla in Arro.

=== Beginning of the main battle ===
As the landing party was disembarking, 3 canoes appeared and were headed to Malolo Lailai. Emmons and Alden took 2 boats and pursued them. Once they were close enough an interpreter asked the natives where they were from. A native responded that they were from Malolo. Emmons fired the forward mounted blunderbuss and killed 6 natives. The rest of the natives jumped in the water. Alden ordered that the rest be taken as prisoners, but his men had bloodlust and shouted "Kill" repeatedly. One man grabbed a Fijian woman by the hair and was about to slash her with his sword when Alden aimed his pistol at him. Alden was able to reign in his men and together with Emmons, and they captured several men, women, and children, including a chief from Arro village. The men were handcuffed and kept captive, but the women and children were released on the beach.

=== The destruction of Arro village ===
While Emmons and Alden were occupied capturing the natives during their engagement, Wilkes proceeded with his boats to Arro. He found the village deserted, and put it to the flame. The men had gone ahead to join the defense of Sualib and the women and children had fled to the mountains. Wilkes continued on and hoped to reinforce Ringgold at Sualib, but found it destroyed. He doubled back and later met Ringgold at Arro.

=== The engagement at Sualib village ===
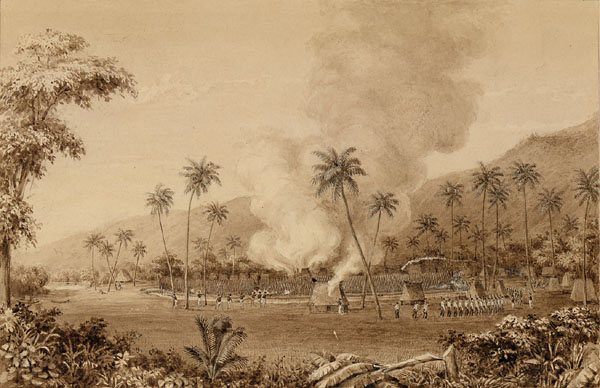
Attack on Sualib village. (Sketch by Alfred Thomas Agate)

The ground force landed at 10 A.M. and divided up in to 3 groups as Wilkes had ordered. The groups were led by Lieutenants Ringgold, Robert Johnson and Andrew Murray, and included passed midshipman Henry Eld and Alfred Thomas Agate of the science corps. Ringgold gave a short speech and reminded the men to destroy everything except the women and children. The forces split up into different paths and destroyed farms along the way, before meeting up and surrounded the fort. The fort itself was circular, with a 12 foot wide by 6 feet deep ditch/dry moat which they used as a trench, and a ten foot tall coconut tree and whicker palisade on all sides. (Note: According to George Musalas Colvocoresses this moat was filled with water.) The natives had occupied the trench and the palisade edges, and together they either aimed their muskets outside of the trench through small holes in the palisade walls. A number of chiefs, recognizable by their white headdresses, commanded the warriors in between the trenches and stockade. The warriors began to shout obscenities at the oncoming attackers.

The Americans fired a Congreve rocket and their muskets at the fort, and the Fijians quickly dashed into the fort. The enemy retreated, a portion of Johnson's division, without orders stormed the fort. The attack was spearheaded by Sinclair with a double barrel shotgun. When Sinclair entered the fort he quickly realized that it was a trap. The ditch which had been built outside of the palisades also extended into the interior and was occupied by a large number of natives. This included women armed with bows who fought with their men. Retreat for Sinclair and his advance was impractical and decidedly more dangerous than it was worth. The fort was purposefully built like a fish weir trap, with a wide opening, but a narrow avenue of escape. Sinclair got shot with an arrow in his lapel, but it only penetrated the fabric of his coat and not the skin.

Sinclair's fortune did not stop at his lapel. The Americans began running up to the palisade and shooting into the village through the small holes the Fijians had previously been using. Musket fire and Congreve rockets poured into Sualib. Americans began trickling into the village, in twos, by a narrow bridge, through the gate, and into the fort following Sinclair's example. At one point Sinclair shot a chief with his pistol, which turned out to be the chief of Sualib. Several natives carried the chiefs limp body to a nearby hut.

The battle crept on in a state of havoc for about 15–30 minutes before a Congreve rocket hit the top of a dry roof and caught fire. A native warrior got on to of the roof in an effort to remove the rocket before the fire spread, but he was shot down in a hail of bullets. The fire proliferated and began to engulf the village. The blaze forced the natives to flee the ditch and into American musket fire, which cut them down. The resulting spectacle was pure pandemonium. A translator attempted to shout that the women and children would be allowed to escape. Fire and guns moke were everywhere, children were weeping, pigs were crying, the fire roared, the noise was ear splitting. The Americans cheered their success and then fell back to a coconut grove, as the village burned.

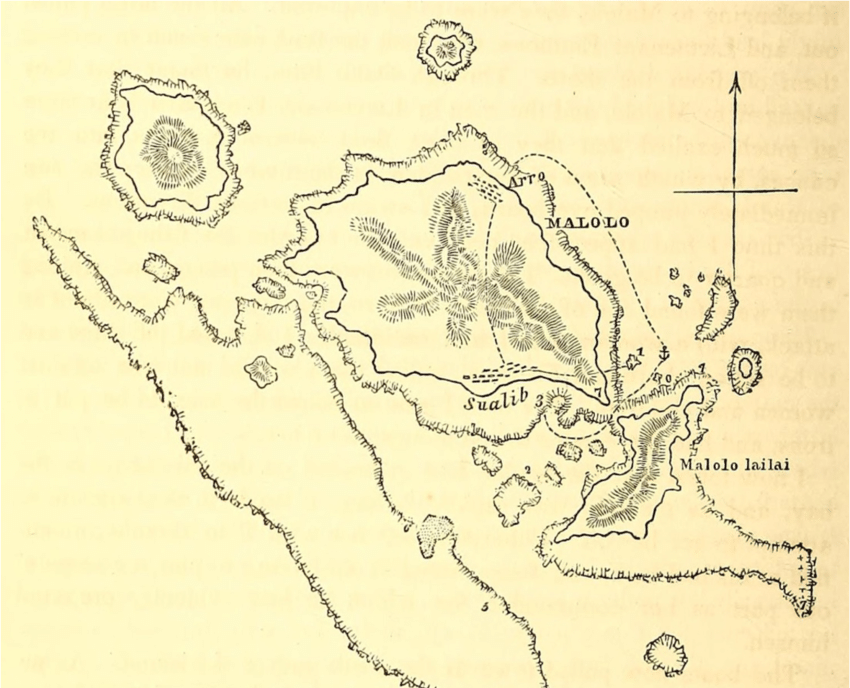
Map of the Malolo Island Group depicting the Battle of Malolo. The numbers correspond to: 1. Place of landing. 2. Boats' Anchorage. 3. Position of boats off Sualib 4. Point where the two canoes were captured 5. Where Lieutenant Emmons met the canoes. 6. Sand Bar. 7. Hill on which the natives sued for mercy. (The ------- line is the track of the boats and shore party.). Notice Malolo Lailai is to the South East of Malolo.

After a half an hour to an hour, the fires had settled to an approachable state, the Americans reentered the village. They soon discovered, that based on the remaining native supplies, the natives had expected a lengthy engagement. The Americans found piles of hollowed out calabashes filled with water, burnt yams and charred pigs. Discarded muskets, spears, and clubs littered the floor of the ditch. The weapons were pilled up on a pyre and immolated. After searching the still standing huts, Underwood's bloody cap was discovered. Out of the bodies only 4 or 5 survived being burnt to ashes including a little girl and the chief of Sualib. The preservation of the chief's cadaver was soon ended, as with a streak of vengeance, the Americans threw his body into a burning house.

Evidence of the horror that had occurred before was still present to the senses of the Americans. The treeline was pierced by misfired arrows. The smoke filled the nostrils of the sailors and marines which took on the smell of burnt human flesh, as it approached the heavens in an otherwise blue sky. It was in this setting that the otherwise exhausted combatants decided to rest and refresh themselves on coconuts to quench their thirst. While the men drank, it was discovered that the most significant injury among them was a sailor who suffered a solitary gash on the leg from an arrow.

=== The rendezvous of Ringgold and Wilkes ===
After the brief respite, the force divided into the marching lines to the nearby village of Arro and burned several houses and farms along the way. It was suspected that most of the surviving villagers were hiding somewhere in the hills. However, they did encounter one native on the way who was instantly bayonetted multiple times to death. Upon arriving there, they found that Arro had already been burned down by Wilkes and Alden. Adding the bayoneted man as a casualty and counting the lowest and highest estimates, approximately 58 to about 88 Fijians had been killed between Arro and Sualib.

=== Final engagement ===
The last skirmish that occurred during the battle lasted throughout much of the day. After midday, Lieutenant Emmons had been tracking 5 canoes that had been spotted in the morning. They had escaped Malolo, and were hiding near Malolo Lailai. Each canoe contained about 8 fighters and their sides were reinforced to curb a potential attack. Emmons was sailing his cutter which was, at this point, only at half its normal capacity. He had only seven men under his command. In any case, Emmons made full sail and pulled up alongside the closest canoe. Emmons fired the forward mounted blunderbuss and killed several natives. Emmons and another sailor jumped in the canoe, as Emmons grappled with a spear throwing native, the sailor killed him with a hatchet. One canoe got away, but the natives in the other canoes jumped overboard. After they took the plunge, they were either shot, slashed, or axed by the Americans as they swam for the shallows. Emmons sailed back to the Porpoise before midnight. In the morning it was discovered that the bodies of the natives killed by Emmons and his men were eaten by sharks.

== Aftermath ==
=== Immediate aftermath ===
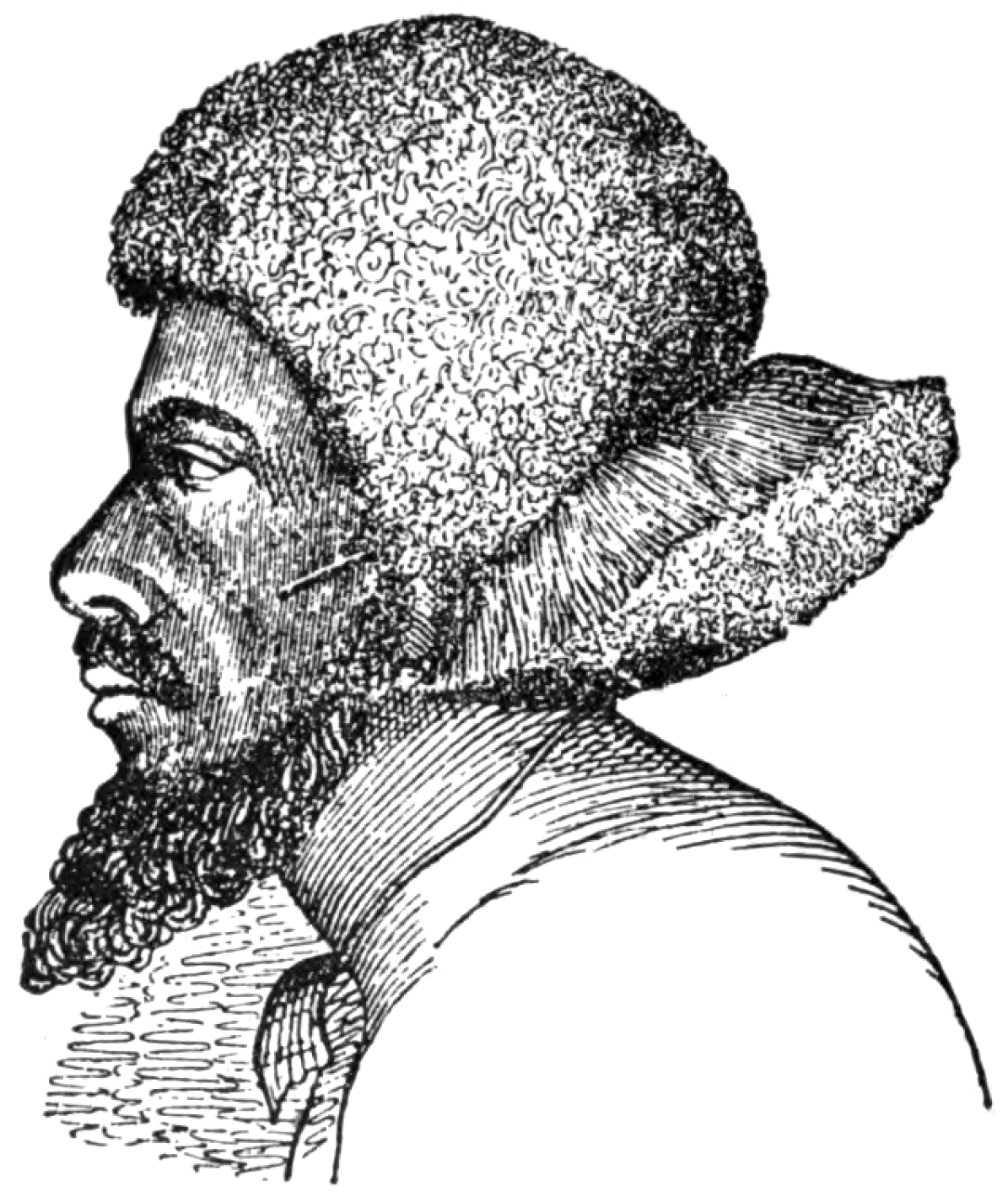
Chief Veidovi before he was shaved. (Image by Alfred Thomas Agate)

The next day (July 25, 1840) Wilkes made plans with a declaration to lead a second engagement to kill "Every man on the Island", however an assembly of natives congregated on the beach near the Flying Fish. Wilkes summoned an interpreter and together they sailed on a gig to shore. As Wilkes drew nearer the crowd dispersed, leaving behind a lone native woman to treat with Wilkes. The native offered Wilkes some of Underwood and Henry's clothes, belongings, and a chicken as an offer of peace. Wilkes retrieved the recovered items from his fallen crewmen, but refused the chicken. Wilkes was under the impression that according to Fijian tradition, for a nation to be truly conquered the populace of that nation must be present to witness a peace declaration. Instead Wilkes entreated to the woman, he and his men would meet on a hill in southern Malolo to discuss peace terms with the whole tribe. If however, the remaining chiefs and peoples of Malolo did not make an appearance, then Wilkes and his men would continue the onslaught.

Around noon, Wilkes and his men climbed the hill, which perfectly overlooked views of the sheer destruction yesterday had delivered. Then, at approximately 4 P.M. a column of weeping natives (including 40 men) began to approach the hill. At first, the native would not go beyond the foot of the hill. However, Wilkes threatened to wipe them out if they did not climb the hill in an act of contrite submission. The natives crawled on their hands and knees up the hill. An old native man approached Wilkes, spoke for Malolo. He begged for mercy, and declared that his people would never attack white men again. He admitted his people were conquered and had only about 80 surviving men left. He also offered Wilkes two young native women in reparation. Wilkes gave a speech through a translator about the power of "white" people and that if a similar attack ever happened again, then he would drive the people of Malolo to extinction.

July 26, Wilkes and his men went to what was left of Arro village and had the people fill casks of water for his vessels. On the morning of July 27, the Flying Fish and Porpoise sailed off the coast of Arro and 70 natives loaded them with 3,000 gallons of water, 12 pigs, and 3,000 coconuts. That same day the natives retrieved Underwood's pocket watch which had melted in the fire, and Henry's glasses.

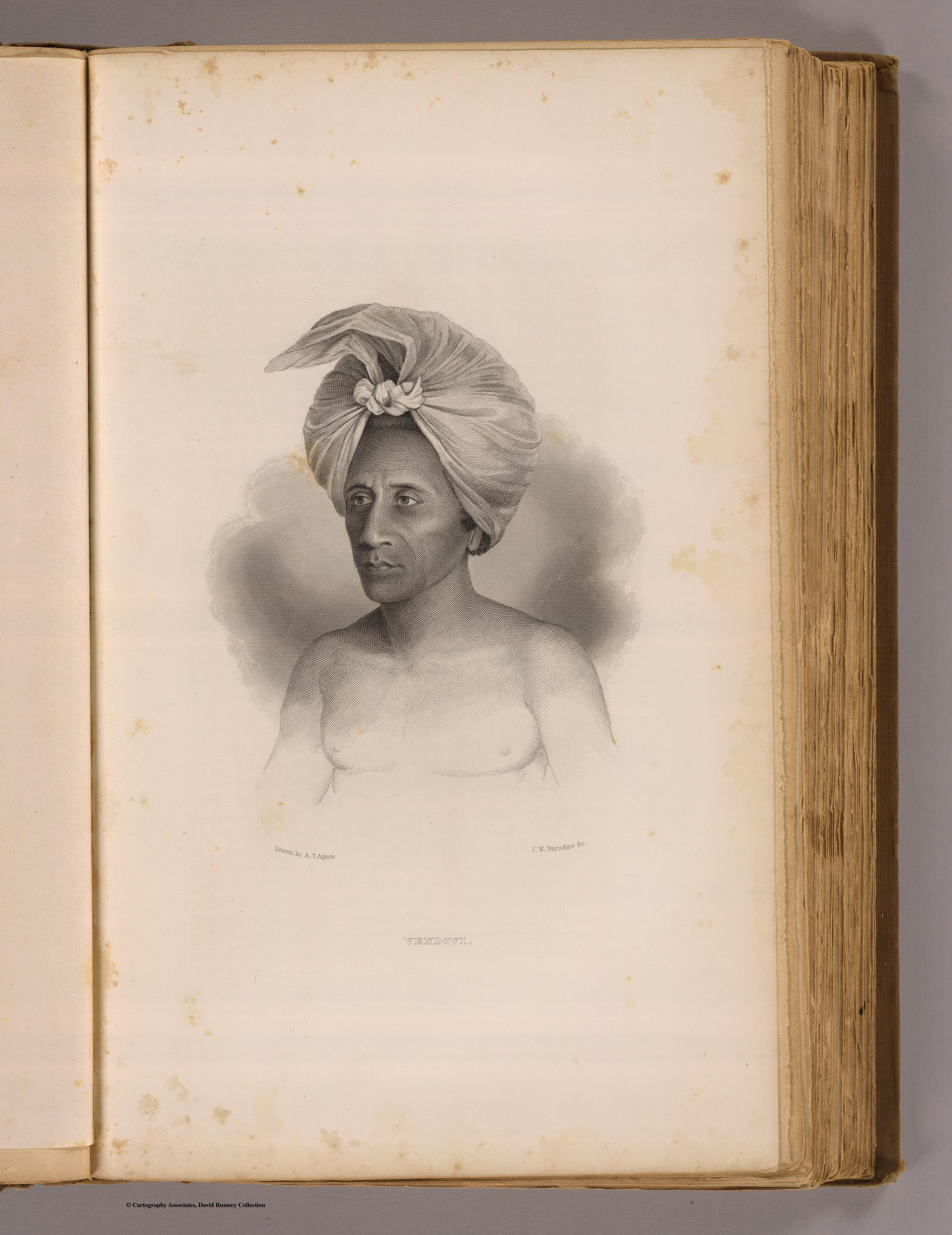
Chief Veidovi after he was given a forced shave. (Sketch by Alfred Thomas Agate)

On July 31, the Flying Fish and Porpoise returned to Bua bay where the rest of the fleet was working. Wilkes privately blamed Alden and Underwood for the deaths of Henry and Underwood. In retaliation, Wilkes had Underwood's possessions sold at an auction to much protest from the officers, and most notably midshipman James Blair who was the executor of Underwood's freshly written will just prior to the battle of Malolo.

Wilkes vindictive streak did not appear to end with Underwood. Wilkes next turned his anger to chief Veidovi. Veidovi was arrested earlier in the expedition by William L. Hudson commander of the Peacock. Veidovi war arrested for organizing an attack resulting in the death of several of the crew members of the bêche-de-mer merchant ship the Charles Doggett in August 1834. He was sentenced to return with the Ex. Ex. to the United States to learn the error of his ways and then be returned to Fiji. From his capture up until the end of the expedition in Fiji, Hudson had been kind to Veidovi and even permitted him to go on deck and speak to the officers. However, Wilkes had Veidovi transferred from the Peacock to his flagship the Vincennes. Now Wilkes kept Veidovi confined to quarters. Moreover, Wilkes had the ships barber cut Vincennes hair. This mortified Veidovi, since his hair marked his status and was important in Fijian culture.

Soon after these events, the Fijian expedition ended. The ships departed on August 11, 1840, and headed for other parts of Polynesia.

=== Events following the end of the Ex. Ex. ===
==== Prosecution ====
Following the conclusion of the Ex. Ex., several court martials were organized for the entire Ex. Ex. expedition. Wilkes had made many enemies in both the Navy, and the government. He was almost universally despised by his men for many of the actions he took during the expedition. Other officers were charged with various crimes, but Wilkes was charged with 11, and his actions throughout the Ex. Ex. were criticized in the defense of the other officers.

For his actions during the Battle of Malolo, Wilkes was charged with illegally attacking the natives. Wilkes justified his actions by stating "But I felt then as I do now, that the punishment was sufficient and effectual, while it was accompanied, as far as it could be, with mercy. Some, no doubt, will look upon it as unnecessarily severe; but if they duly considered the wanton murders that have been committed on the whites in this group of islands, merely to gratify the desire of plunder or the horrid appetite for cannibal repasts, they would scarcely think the punishment too severe." Additionally, Wilkes claimed that he called for restraint in the attacks on the Fijians, but the log books indicated that he ordered only the sparing of women and children. However, even the most ardent of Wilkes detractors supported Wilkes on this matter. Many of them indicated by their words and actions that they hated the natives for killing their friends and desired revenge. What's more, Wilkes was able to garner sympathy for the death of his nephew of which it was universally acknowledged that he loved dearly. Ultimately Wilkes was cleared of all charges including his Fiji charges. The exception was that Wilkes was found guilty of illegally flogging Marines and Sailors in Hawaii after they refused to work when their enlistments were up. As a consequence, Wilkes was given a public reprimand.

==== Monument ====
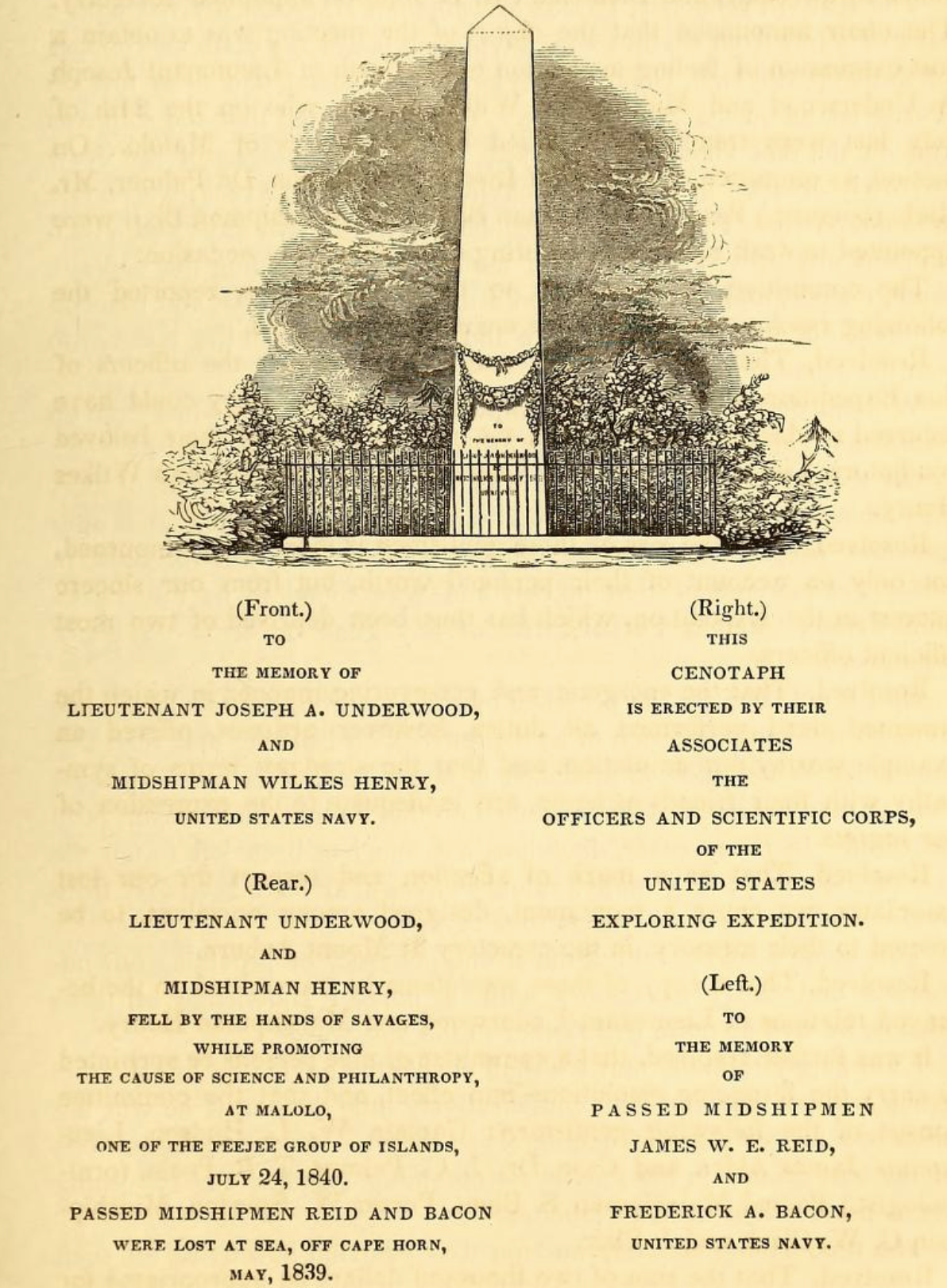
Monument to the Officers of the United States Exploring Expedition Mount Auburn Cemetery in Cambridge Massachusetts including Lieutenant Joseph Underwood and passed midshipman Henry Wilkes (Nephew of Charles Wilkes)

In 1843, a 22 foot cenotaph obelisk was built in Mount Auburn Cemetery in Cambridge Massachusetts to remember the officers who had fallen in the Ex. Ex. More specifically, the monument memorialized the loss of life in two separate events of the Ex. Ex. This included the loss of the USS Sea Gull (1838) a schooner that was Captained by Midshipman James W. Reid with the help of Midshipman Frederick A. Bacon. The Sea Gull was awaiting resupply from the USS Relief (1836), after which she was due to rendezvous with the rest of the fleet at Valparaíso, Chile. She was last spotted off Cape Horn at Midnight on 28 April 1839. After a while when the Sea Gull never returned the Ex. Ex. assumed all souls were lost.

While one side of the obelisk commemorates the memory of the officers of the Sea Gull, another preserves the memory of Henry Wilkes and Joseph Underwood killed during the first day of the battle of Malolo. The Officers and Scientific Corps. of the expedition took up a collection for their fallen comrades by the end of the Ex. Ex. Wilkes and his family desired that this monument should be constructed at a cemetery in Brooklyn, New York for the benefit of Henry's mother and sister who lived near by. However, in part due to spite over Wilkes' treatment of them the officers had the monument built in Cambridge close to Underwood's widow.

Specifically the Obelisk reads: "To the memory of Lieutenant Joseph A. Underwood and Midshipman Wilkes Henry, U. S. N. To the memory of passed midshipmen Jas. W. E. Reid and Frederick A. Bacon, U. S. N. This cenotaph is erected by their associates, the officers and scientific corps of the U. Exploring Expedition. Lieutenant Underwood and Midshipman Henry fell by the hands of savages, while promoting the cause of science and philanthropy, at Malolo, one of the Fiji Group of Islands, July 24, 1840, passed midshipmen Reid and Bacon were lost at sea, off Cane Horn, May, 1839."

== See also ==
Trent Affair

1855 Fiji expedition

1859 Fiji expedition
