= USS Sea Gull (1838) =

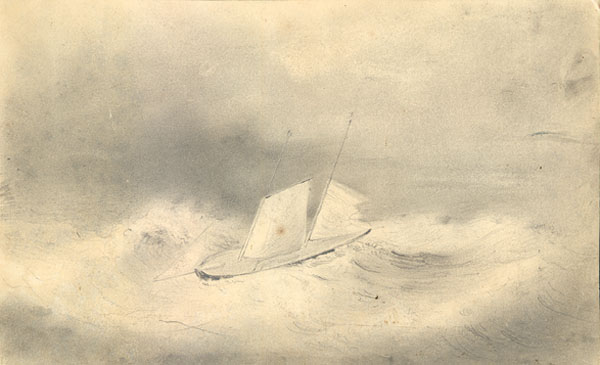
- The Sea Gull in heavy seas, drawn by Alfred Thomas Agate

History

United States
- Name: Sea Gull
- Acquired: by purchase, 3 August 1838
- Fate: Lost at sea, April 1839

General characteristics
- Type: Schooner
- Armament: 2 guns

USS Sea Gull was a schooner in the service of the United States Navy. The Sea Gull was one of six ships that sailed in the US Exploring Expedition (known as the US Ex. Ex.) in 1838 to survey the coast of the then-unknown continent of Antarctica and the Pacific Islands. The specimens collected on the voyage would later form the backbone of the Smithsonian Institution.

== Acquisition ==
Formerly the New York pilot boat New Jersey, the ship was purchased by the Navy in 3 August 1838 and renamed USS Sea Gull. She was outfitted with a new mast and sails in three days and, under the command of Passed Midshipman James W. E. Reid, sailed for Hampton Roads to join the expedition as a tender.

== The US Exploring Expedition ==
At Norfolk, Virginia the Sea Gull joined the other ships of the expedition: flagship Vincennes, Peacock, Porpoise, the schooner Flying Fish, and the supply ship Relief.

The ships left Norfolk on August 18, 1838, for the tip of South America, where they would await the slower Relief and then continue to Antarctica and the Pacific Islands. After surveying and collecting specimens, the remaining ships would sail to Hawaii and then the Columbia River to survey that area then return to the United States via the Cape of Good Hope on June 9, 1842.

The Sea Gull, commanded by Lieutenant Robert Johnson and in the company of the Porpoise, headed south from Orange Bay, Hardy Peninsula, Chile on the tip of South America on February 25, 1839, to explore the area of the South Shetland Islands. Both ships encountered heavy seas which resulted in a broken gaff for the Sea Gull; the crew was constantly drenched by huge waves. Soon they encountered snow squalls and penguins. Huge icebergs were sighted, some said to be as large as the U.S. Capitol building. On March 1, some islands of the South Shetlands were sighted. Attempts were made to land on the islands and gather specimens but the seas proved too rough to make a landing. On March 5, the wind increased to a whole gale and the commander of the expedition — Lt. Charles Wilkes — ordered the ships about and headed north. Wilkes ordered Johnson to proceed back to Orange Bay after stopping at Deception Island to attempt to retrieve a self-reading thermometer left there by an earlier British expedition. After removing ice from the ship's rigging, the crew of the Sea Gull headed for Deception. The crew didn't find the thermometer but did experience the volcanism of the island finding it frightening and unnerving to know they were standing on an active volcano. Eventually the ship made its way to Orange Bay. After reaching Orange Bay the Sea Gull participated in a search for a missing crew in a survey launch, finding the launch eventually safe and sound with all aboard.

=== Loss of the Sea Gull ===
On April 17, 1839, Wilkes left Orange Bay in Vincennes with Porpoise for Valparaíso, Chile and ordered the schooners Flying Fish and Sea Gull to wait ten days for the supply ship Relief. If the Relief didn't arrive they were to transport the scientists aboard to Valparaíso. On May 19, the Flying Fish arrived in Valparaíso and the Sea Gull was nowhere in sight. The Sea Gull, under the command of passed midshipman James Reid, was last seen waiting out a gale in the lee of Staten Island off Cape Horn at Midnight on 28 April. After a month or so, the officers of the Ex. Ex. assumed the Sea Gull was lost and took up a collection for a monument to their memory. That monument stands in the Mount Auburn Cemetery in Cambridge, Massachusetts. It lists the names of the officers who were lost on the Sea Gull and the names of two officers who were killed during the survey of the Pacific Islands. No mention was made of the other 24 sailors and marines who died during the expedition.

== Bibliography ==
Philbrick, Nathaniel (2003). Sea of Glory: America's Voyage of Discovery, the U.S. Exploring Expedition, 1838–1842. Viking Adult. ISBN 0-670-03231-X.
