= Henry Eld =

American explorer and naval officer (1814–1850)

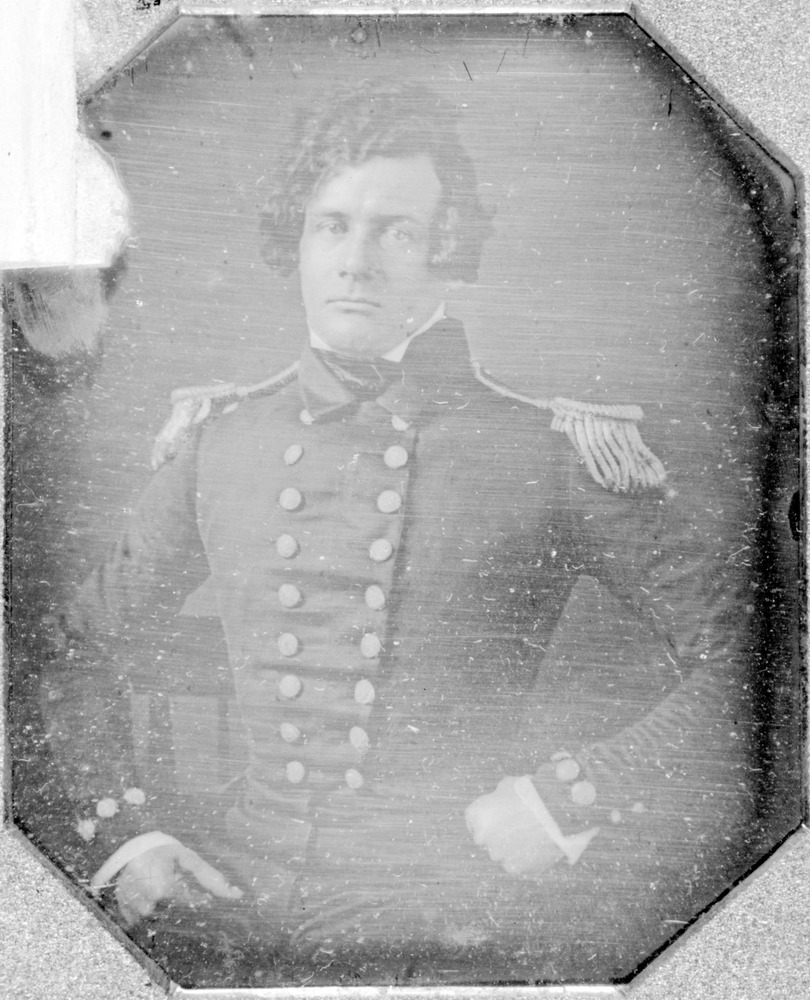
Photo believed to show Lieut. Henry Eld

Henry Eld (June 2, 1814—March 12, 1850) was a United States Navy officer, geographer, and Antarctic explorer.

== Biography ==
Eld was born in Cedar Hill, New Haven, Connecticut, on June 2, 1814, and lived in the area now known as View Street, but when it started becoming more populated he removed his house and relocated.

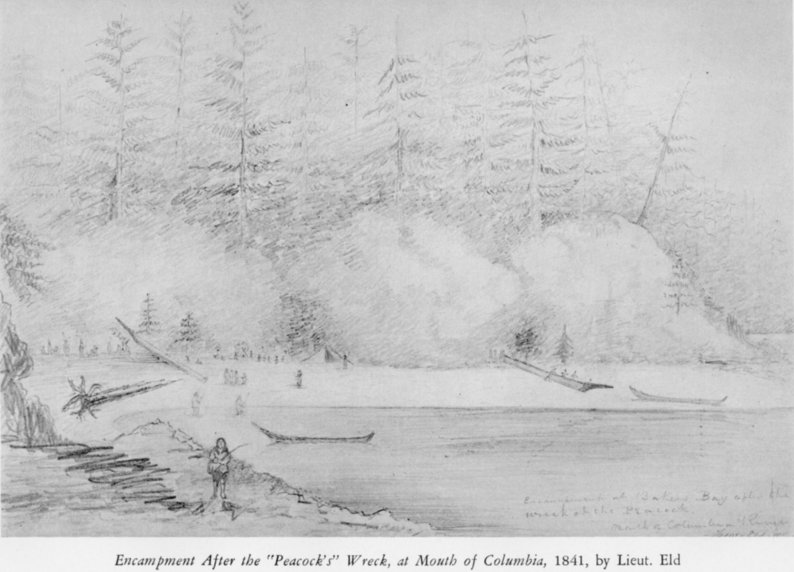
Encampment After the "Peacock's" Wreck, at Mouth of Columbia, 1841 by Lieut. Eld

Eld served as a geographer on the ship Peacock, on the ship Vincennes at Fiji, and joined Lieutenant George Emmons's overland journey through Oregon and California (while in California he was involved in the Mexican War). He produced 43 maps and 42 pencil sketches of the land between the Columbia River and the Sacramento Valley.

Passed Midshipman Eld was one of the officers of the United States Exploring Expedition under Capt. Charles Wilkes in 1838 and 1842 in search of the Antarctic continent, which Eld first descried and called out land from the crosstree of the sloop Peacock on January 16, 1840. From this the United States dates the first discovery of the Antarctic continent, and Capt. Wilkes named the highest mountain peak Eld Peak (which is part of what was later named the Lazarev Mountains). They proved that the Antarctic was a continent (Eld was the first to see the Antarctic mountains at a crucial stage of their survey of the ice fields). On January 10, 1840, Eld was part of a two-man landing party to investigate Macquarie Island, one of the first men to do so. Splitting with his quarter-master, he explored a penguin rookery alone, and was surprised by resistance the birds gave him. Eld kept journals and sketch books of the Wilkes Expedition, accompanied by letters, reports and orders, documenting his personal and professional life.

Specimens were collected during the expedition - fifty thousand plants, and over 7 thousand mineral specimens, 3 thousand insects, innumerable shells, fish, reptiles, mammals, and hundreds of tribal artifacts- all these became scientific treasure.

Also, Eld Inlet of Puget Sound in Washington state was named after Eld by Capt. Wilkes during the United States Exploring Expedition, to honor him.

Henry Eld died at sea on board U. S. ship of war Ohio on March 12, 1850, bound home from Rio de Janeiro after a 3 1/2-year cruise.

== Tributes ==
A Sailor's Poem written in memory of Henry Eld's passing in 1854:

"...thrice had weary sickness laid him low
Upon the troubled couch of feverish pain —
And days and nights of anguish measured slow
Their length upon the prostrate sufferer's chain;
Yet oft bright visions to his heart would come..."
