= United States Exploring Expedition =

American exploring and surveying expedition, 1838 to 1842

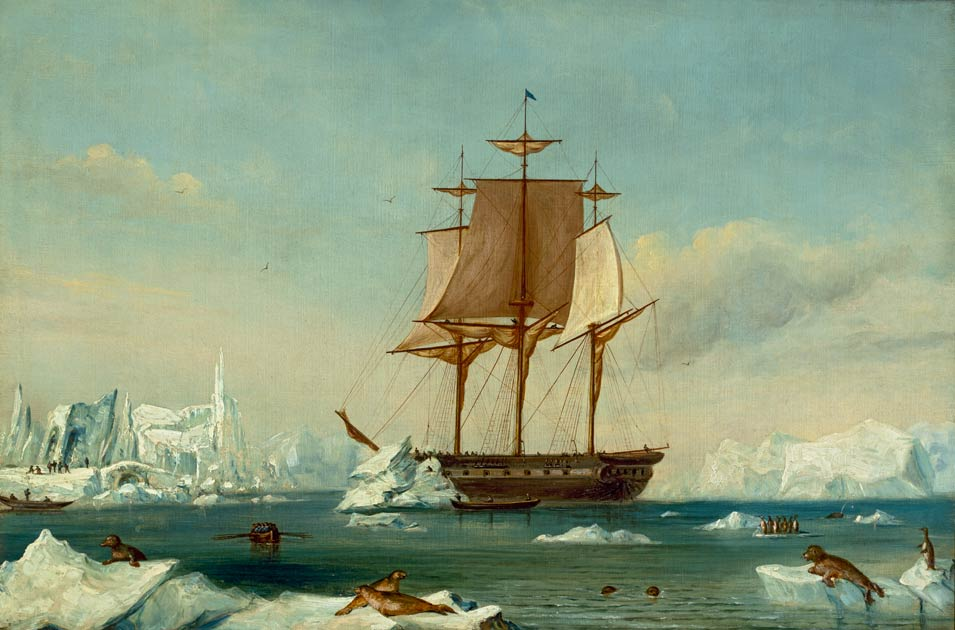
The USS Vincennes at Disappointment Bay in early 1840

The United States Exploring Expedition of 1838–1842 was an exploring and surveying expedition of the Pacific Ocean and surrounding lands conducted by the United States. The original appointed commanding officer was Commodore Thomas ap Catesby Jones. Funding for the original expedition was requested by President John Quincy Adams in 1828; however, Congress would not implement funding until eight years later. In May 1836, the oceanic exploration voyage was finally authorized by Congress and created by President Andrew Jackson.

The expedition is sometimes called the U.S. Ex. Ex. for short, or the Wilkes Expedition in honor of its next appointed commanding officer, United States Navy Lieutenant Charles Wilkes. The expedition was of major importance to the growth of science in the United States, in particular the then-young field of oceanography. During the event, armed conflict between Pacific islanders and the expedition was common and dozens of natives were killed in action, as well as a few Americans.

== Preparations ==
Through the lobbying efforts of Jeremiah N. Reynolds, (Note: Reynolds had previously lobbied for a U.S. expedition to the north pole and an alleged entrance to the hollow Earth, a petition which received 25 Congressional votes in favor.) the United States House of Representatives passed a resolution on May 21, 1828, requesting President John Quincy Adams to send a ship to explore the Pacific. Adams was keen on the resolution and ordered his secretary of the Navy to ready a ship, the Peacock. The House voted an appropriation in December but the bill stalled in the US Senate in February 1829. Then, under President Andrew Jackson, Congress passed legislation in 1836 approving the exploration mission. Again, the effort stalled under Secretary of the Navy Mahlon Dickerson until President Martin Van Buren assumed office and pushed the effort forward.

Originally, the expedition was under the command of Commodore Jones but he resigned in November 1837, frustrated with all of the procrastination. Secretary of War Joel Roberts Poinsett then assigned command to Wilkes in April 1838, after more senior officers refused the command. Wilkes had a reputation for hydrography, geodesy, and magnetism. Additionally, Wilkes had received mathematics training from Nathaniel Bowditch, triangulation methods from Ferdinand Hassler, and geomagnetism from James Renwick.

Personnel included naturalists, botanists, a mineralogist, a taxidermist, and a philologist. They were carried aboard the sloops-of-war USS Vincennes (780 tons), and USS Peacock (650 tons), the brig USS Porpoise (230 tons), the full-rigged ship Relief, which served as a store-ship, and two schooners, Sea Gull (110 tons) and USS Flying Fish (96 tons), which served as tenders.

On August 18, 1838, the vessels left the naval port of Hampton Roads, Virginia. The fleet then headed to Madeira, taking advantage of the prevailing winds.

== Ships and personnel ==
The expedition consisted of nearly 350 men, many of whom were not assigned to any specific vessel. Others served on more than one vessel.

=== Ships ===
- USS Vincennes – sloop-of-war, 780 tons, 18 guns, flagship
- USS Peacock – sloop-of-war, 650 tons, 22 guns
- USS Relief – full-rigged ship, 468 tons, 7 guns
- USS Porpoise – brig, 230 tons, 10 guns
- USS Sea Gull – schooner, 110 tons, 2 guns
- USS Flying Fish – schooner, 96 tons, 2 guns
- USS Oregon – brig, 250 tons, 2 guns

=== Command ===
- Charles Wilkes – Expedition commander and commandant of Vincennes
- Cadwalader Ringgold – Lieutenant commandant of Porpoise
- Andrew K. Long – Lieutenant commandant of Relief
- William L. Hudson – Commandant of Peacock
- Samuel R. Knox – Commandant of Flying Fish
- James W. E. Reid – Commandant of Sea Gull

=== Naval officers ===
- James Alden – Lieutenant
- Daniel Ammen - Passed midshipman
- Thomas A. Budd – Lieutenant and cartographer
- Simon F. Blunt – Passed midshipman
- Augustus Case – Lieutenant
- George Colvocoresses – Midshipman
- Edwin De Haven – Acting Master
- Henry Eld – Midshipman
- George F. Emmons – Lieutenant
- Charles Guillou – Assistant surgeon
- William L. Maury – Lieutenant
- William Reynolds – Passed midshipman
- Richard R. Waldron – Purser
- Thomas W. Waldron – Captain's clerk

=== Scientific corps ===
- Alfred T. Agate – Artist
- Joseph Drayton – Artist
- William Brackenridge – Assistant botanist
- Joseph P. Couthouy – Conchologist
- James D. Dana – Mineralogist and geologist
- Horatio Hale – Philologist
- Titian Peale – Naturalist
- Charles Pickering – Naturalist
- William Rich – Botanist

== History ==
=== Expedition ===
==== First part ====
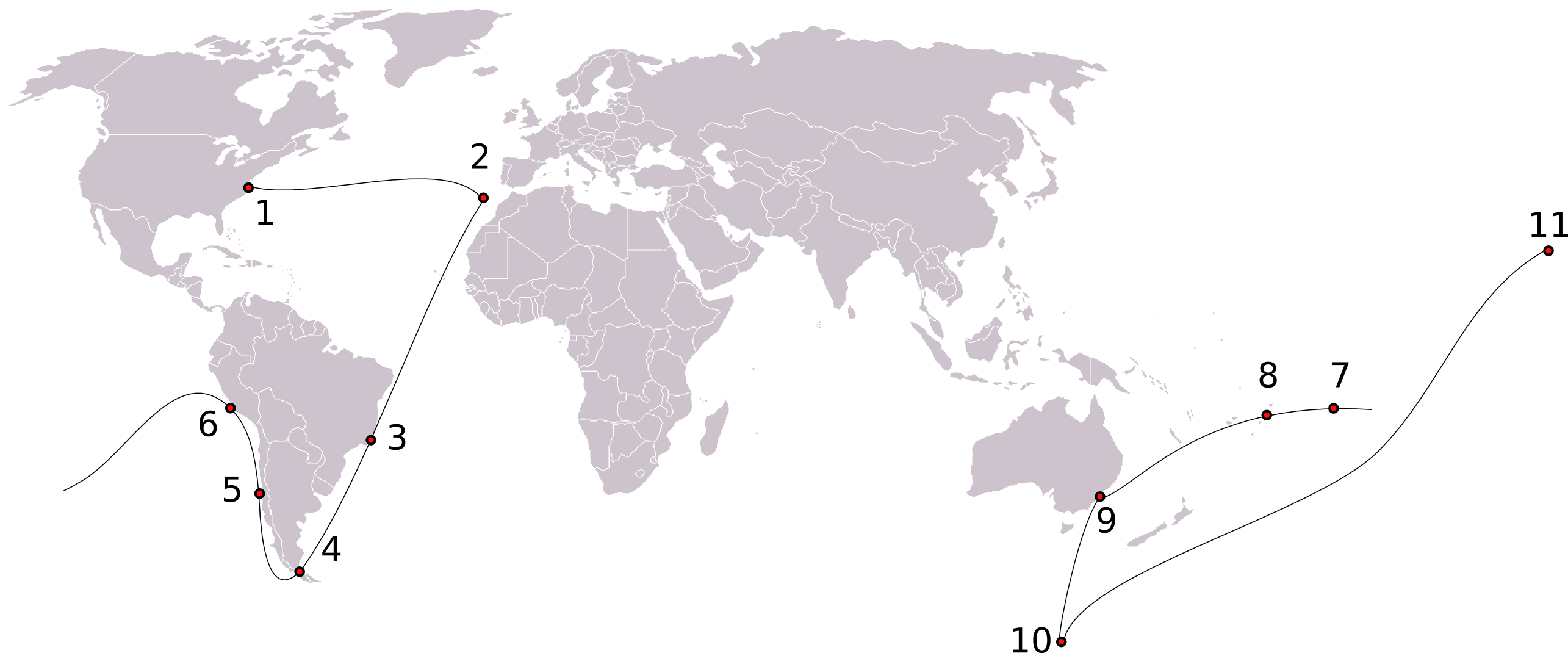
First Part of Voyage Route: 1. Hampton Roads – 2. Madeira – 3. Rio de Janeiro – 4. Tierra del Fuego – 5. Valparaíso – 6. Callao – 7. Tahiti – 8. Samoa – 9. Sydney – 10. Antarctica – 11. Sandwich Islands (via Fiji)

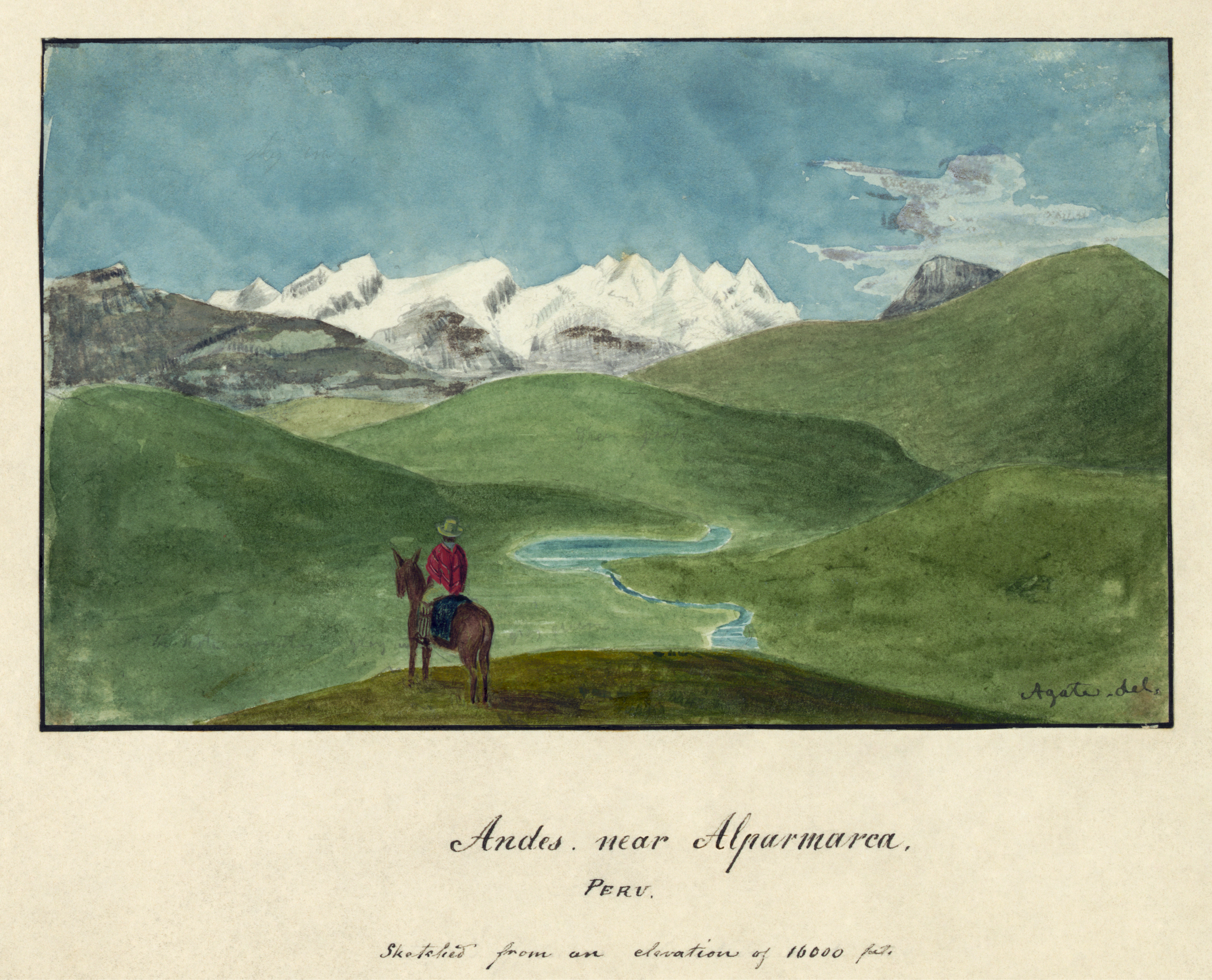
Andes near Alparmarca, Peru: Sketched from an Elevation of 16,000 Feet, an illustration by Alfred Agate

Wilkes was to search in the Atlantic for various vigias or shoals, such as those reported by John Purdy, but failed to corroborate those claims for the locations given. The squadron arrived in the Madeira Islands on September 16, 1838, and Porto Praya on October 6. The Peacock arrived at Rio de Janeiro on November 21, and the Vincennes with brigs and schooners on November 24. However, the Relief did not arrive until November 27, setting a record for slowness, 100 days. While there, they used Enxados Island in Guanabara Bay for an observatory and naval yard for repair and refitting.

The Squadron did not leave Rio de Janeiro until January 6, 1839, arriving at the mouth of the Río Negro on January 25. On February 19, the squadron joined the Relief, Flying Fish, and Sea Gull in Orange Harbor, Hoste Island, after passing through Le Maire Strait. While there, the expedition came in contact with the Fuegians. Wilkes sent an expedition south in an attempt to exceed Captain Cook's farthest point south, 71°10'.

The Flying Fish reached 70° on March 22, in the area about 100 miles (160 kilometers) north of Thurston Island, and what is now called Cape Flying Fish, and the Walker Mountains. The squadron joined the Peacock in Valparaíso on May 10, but the Sea Gull was reported missing. On June 6, the squadron arrived at San Lorenzo, off Callao for repair and provisioning, while Wilkes dispatched the Relief homewards on June 21. Leaving South America on July 12, the expedition reached Reao of the Tuamotu Group on August 13, and Tahiti on September 11. They departed Tahiti on October 10.

The expedition then visited Samoa and New South Wales, Australia. In December 1839, the expedition sailed from Sydney into the Antarctic Ocean and reported the discovery of the Antarctic continent on January 16, 1840, when Henry Eld and William Reynolds aboard the Peacock sighted Eld Peak and Reynolds Peak along the George V Coast. On January 19, Reynolds spotted Cape Hudson. On January 25, the Vincennes sighted the mountains behind the Cook Ice Shelf, similar peaks at Piner Bay on January 30, and had covered 800 miles (1,300 kilometers) of coastline by February 12, from 140° 30' E. to 112° 16' 12"E., when Wilkes acknowledged they had "discovered the Antarctic Continent." Named Wilkes Land, it includes Claire Land, Banzare Land, Sabrina Land, Budd Land, and Knox Land. They charted 1,500 miles (2,400 kilometers) of Antarctic coastline to a westward goal of 105° E., the edge of Queen Mary Land, before departing to the north again on February 21.

The Porpoise came across the French expedition of Jules Dumont d'Urville on January 30. However, due to a misunderstanding of each other's intentions, the Porpoise and Astrolabe were unable to communicate. In February 1840, some of the expedition were present at the initial signing of the Treaty of Waitangi in New Zealand. Some of the squadron then proceeded back to Sydney for repairs, while the rest visited the Bay of Islands, before arriving in Tonga in April. At Nuku'alofa they met King Josiah (Aleamotu'a), and the George (Taufa'ahau), chief of Ha'apai, before proceeding onwards to Fiji on May 4 in the Fiji Expedition of 1840. The Porpoise surveyed the Low Archipelago, while the Vincennes and Peacock proceeded onwards to Ovalau, where they signed a commercial treaty with Tanoa Visawaqa in Levuka. Edward Belcher's HMS Starling visited Ovalau at the same time. Hudson arrested Vendovi, after holding his brothers Cocanauto, Qaraniqio, and Tui Dreketi (Roko Tui Dreketi or King of Rewa Province) hostage. Vendovi was perceived responsible for an attack against the US sailors of the Charles Doggett on Ono Island after the sailors made a trade treaty with Vendovi for bêche-de-mer in August 1834. It was agreed between Vendovi and Captain Bachelor of the Charles Doggett, that a minor chief would willingly be taken hostage for the protection of the Westerners while they set up a bêche-de-mer house on shore. Later the minor chief feigned sickness and was allowed to return to shore. The next day the minor chief returned with Vendovi and some of his men and asked for medicine at the bêche-de-mer house. The mate, eight other men, and a boy came ashore, all except one were killed, robbed, and the house was set on fire. One survivor swam back to the ship. The next day the captain through an interpreter was able to negotiate for all the bodies back except an African American crewmate whose body was eaten. Vendovi was detained and taken to the US, but died in captivity shortly after his arrival in New York. His skull was added to the expedition collections and put on display in the Patent Office building in Washington, D.C.

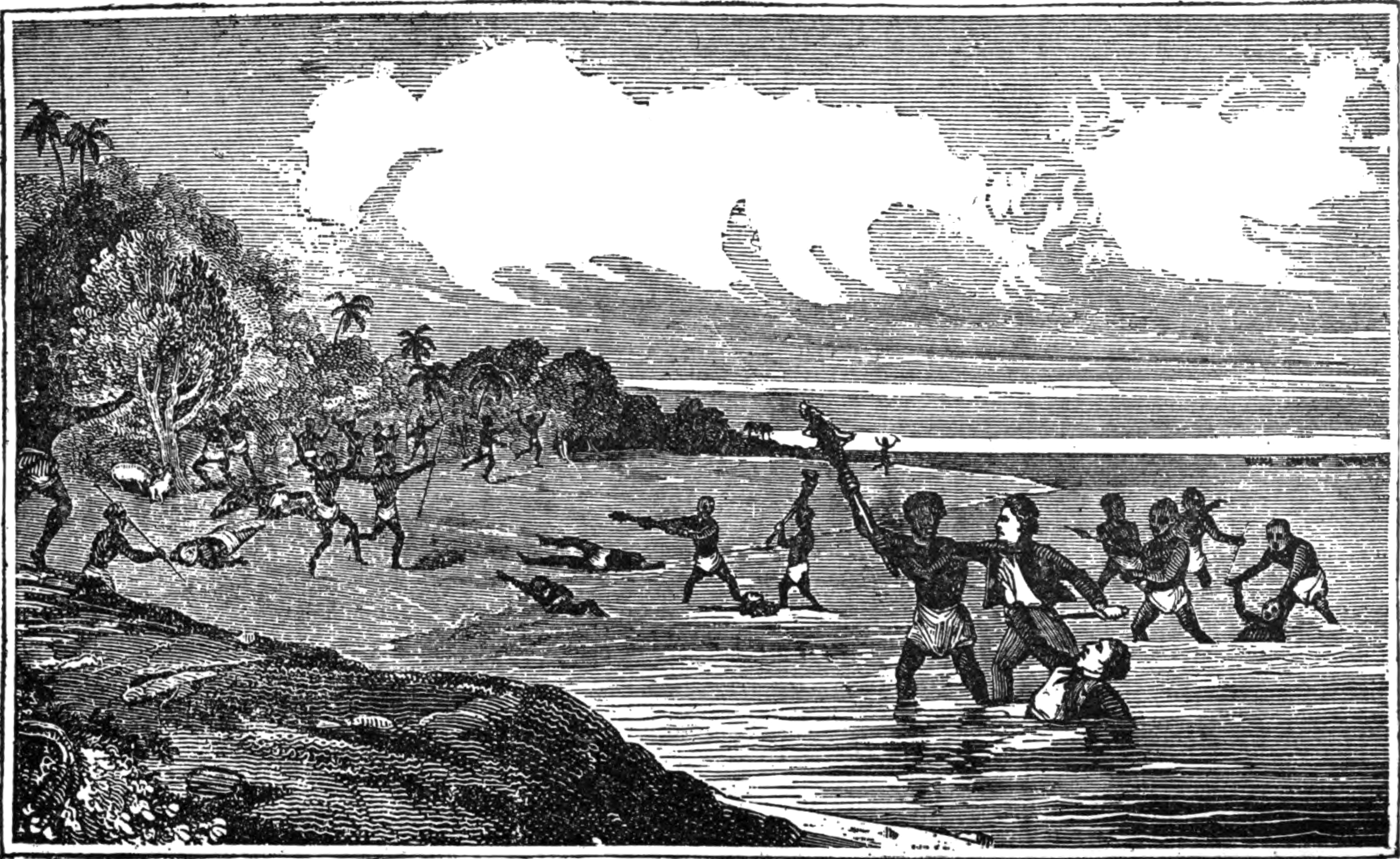
The killing of lieutenant Underwood and passed midshipman Wilkes Henry during the opening of the Battle of Malolo.

On July 24, 1840, the Battle of Malolo began when two members of the party, Lieutenant Underwood and Wilkes' nephew, Midshipman Wilkes Henry, were killed while bartering for food in western Fiji's Malolo Island. The cause of this event was that the expedition held a Chief's son hostage. Immediately prior to their deaths, the son of the local chief, who was being held as a hostage by the Americans, escaped by jumping out of the boat and running through the shallow water for shore. The Americans fired over his head. According to members of the expedition party on the boat, his escape was intended as a prearranged signal by the Fijians to attack, while according to those on shore, the shooting triggered the attack on the ground. The Americans landed an invading force of 70 sailors to attack the natives. Close to between 74 and 104 Fijians were killed, while two villages were razed.

==== Return route ====
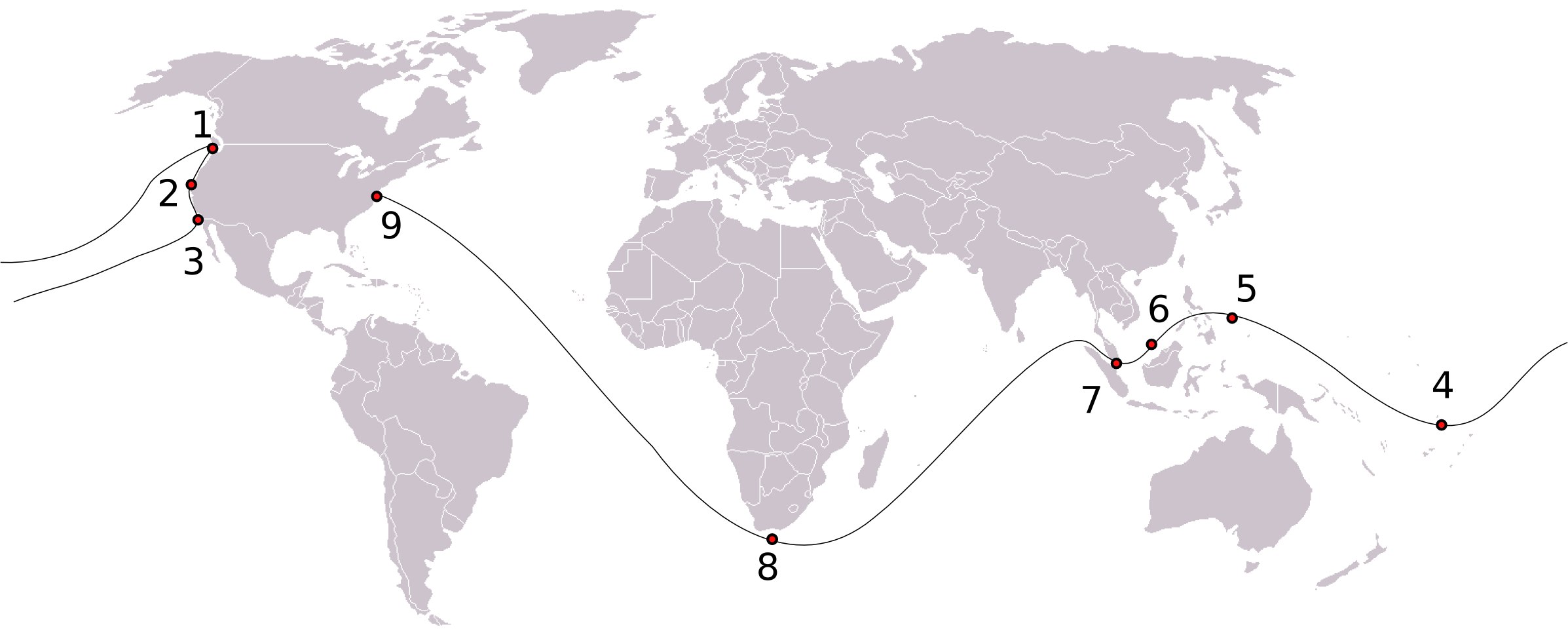
Return route: 1. Puget Sound – 2. Columbia River – 3. San Francisco – 4. Polynesia – 5. Philippines – 6. Borneo – 7. Singapore – 8. Cape of Good Hope – 9. New York

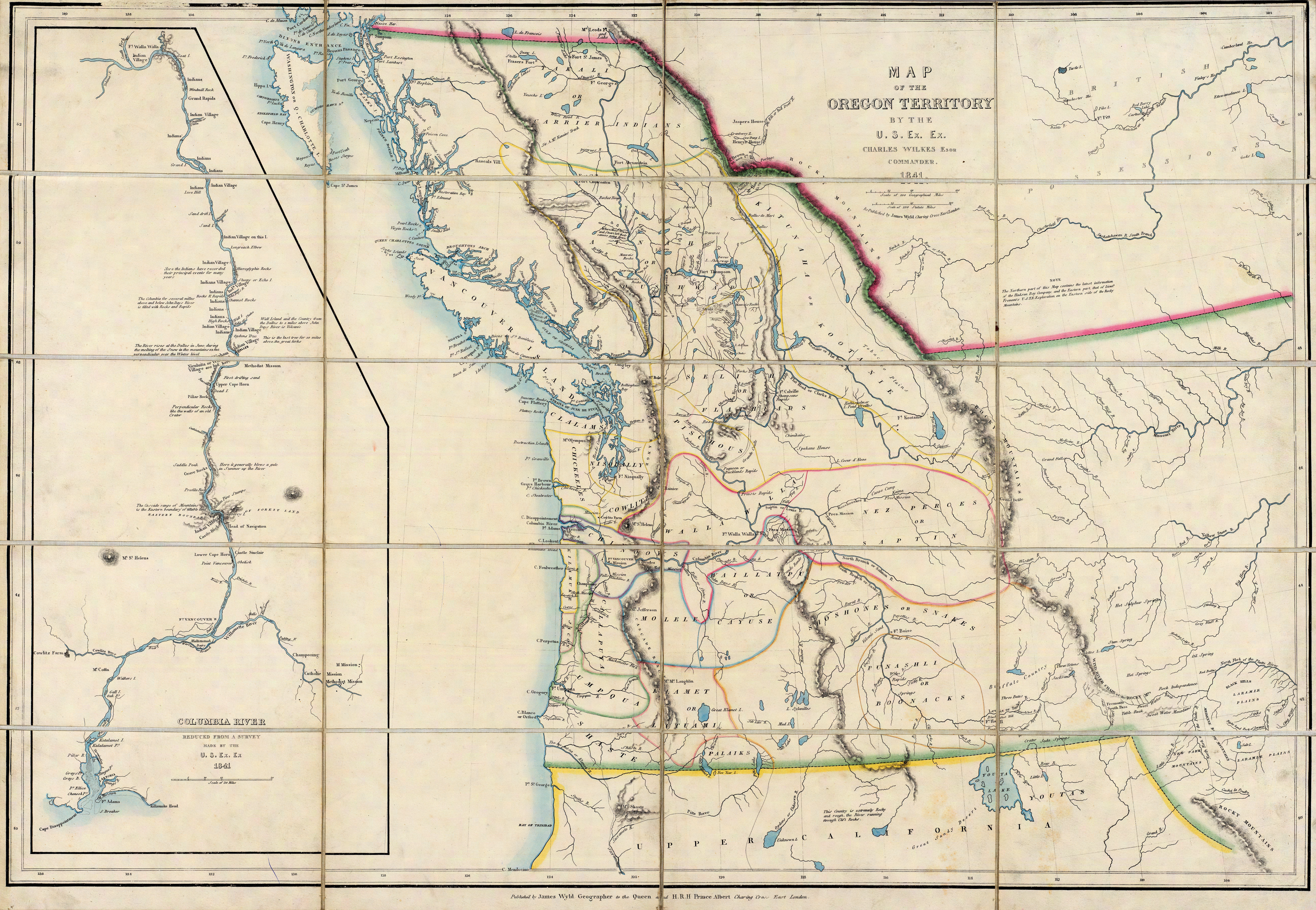
Narrative of the United States Exploring Expedition, an 1841 map of the Oregon Territory

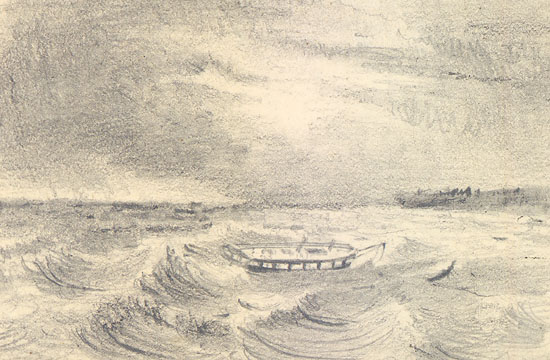
The Peacock after hitting the bar of the Columbia River near Cape Disappointment in Washington state

On August 9, after three months of surveying, the squadron met off Macuata. The Vincennes and Peacock proceeded onwards to the Sandwich Islands, with the Flying Fish and Porpoise to meet them in Oahu by October. Along the way, Wilkes named the Phoenix Group and made a stop at the Palmyra Atoll, making their group the first European scientific expedition in their known history to visit Palmyra. While in Hawaii, the officers were welcomed by Governor Kekūanaōʻa, King Kamehameha III, his aide William Richards, and the journalist James Jackson Jarves. The expedition surveyed Kauai, Oahu, Hawaii, and the peak of Mauna Loa. The Porpoise was dispatched in November to survey several of the Tuamotus, including Aratika, Kauehi, Raraka, and Katiu, and then proceeded to Penrhyn before returning to Oahu on 24 March.

On April 5, 1841, the squadron departed Honolulu, the Porpoise and Vincennes for the Pacific Northwest, the Peacock and Flying Fish to resurvey Samoa, before rejoining the squadron. Along the way, the Peacock and Flying Fish surveyed Jarvis Island, Enderbury Island, the Tokelau Islands, and Fakaofo. The Peacock followed this with surveys of the Tuvalu islands of Nukufetau, Vaitupu, and Nanumanga in March. In April, the Peacock surveyed the Gilbert Islands of Tabiteuea, Nonouti, Aranuka, Maiana, Abemama, Kuria, Tarawa, Marakei, Butaritari, and Makin, before returning to Oahu on June 13. The Peacock and Flying Fish then left for the Columbia River on June 21.

In April 1841, USS Peacock, under Lieutenant William L. Hudson, and USS Flying Fish, surveyed Drummond's Island, which was named for an American of the expedition. Lieutenant Hudson heard from a member of his crew that a ship had wrecked off the island and her trespassing crew killed by the Gilbertese. A woman and her child had survived, so Hudson decided to invade with a small force of marines and sailors, under William M. Walker, to search the island. Initially, the locals were peaceful and the Americans were able to survey the island without consequences. When the party was returning to their ship, Hudson noticed a member of his crew was missing.

After making another search, the man was not found and the natives began arming themselves in response to the military presence. Lieutenant Walker returned his force to the ship, to converse with Hudson, who ordered Walker to invade again and demand the return of the sailor. Walker then reboarded his boats with his landing party and headed to shore. Walker shouted his demand and the natives charged for him, forcing the boats to turn back to the ships. It was decided on the next day that the Americans would bombard the indigenous people and invade again. While doing this, a force of around 700 Gilbertese warriors opposed the American invasion but were defeated after a long battle. No Americans were hurt, but twelve natives were killed while others were wounded. The invaders destroyed two villages. A similar episode of violence occurred two months before in February when the Peacock and the Flying Fish briefly bombarded the island of Upolu, Samoa following the death of an American merchant sailor on the island.

The Vincennes and Porpoise reached Cape Disappointment on April 28, 1841, but then headed north to the Strait of Juan de Fuca, Port Discovery, and Fort Nisqually, where they were welcomed by William Henry McNeill and Alexander Caulfield Anderson. The Porpoise surveyed the Admiralty Inlet, while boats from the Vincennes surveyed Hood Canal, and the coast northwards to the Fraser River. Wilkes visited Fort Clatsop, John McLoughlin at Fort Vancouver, and William Cannon on the Willamette River, while he sent Lt. Johnson on an expedition to Fort Okanogan, Fort Colvile and Fort Nez Perces, where they met Marcus Whitman. Like his predecessor, British explorer George Vancouver, Wilkes spent a good deal of time near Bainbridge Island. He noted the bird-like shape of the harbor at Winslow and named it Eagle Harbor. Continuing his fascination with bird names, he named Bill Point and Wing Point. Port Madison, Washington and Points Monroe and Jefferson were named in honor of former United States presidents. Port Ludlow was assigned to honor Lieutenant Augustus Ludlow, who lost his life during the War of 1812.

The Peacock and Flying Fish arrived off Cape Disappointment on July 17. However, the Peacock went aground while attempting to enter the Columbia River and was soon lost, though with no loss of life. The crew was able to lower six boats and get everyone into Baker's Bay, along with their journals, surveys, the chronometers, and some of Agate's sketches. A one-eyed Indigenous man named George then guided the Flying Fish into the same bay.

There, the crew set up "Peacockville", assisted by James Birnie of the Hudson's Bay Company, and the American Methodist Mission at Point Adams. They also traded with the local Clatsop and Chinookan Indians over the next three weeks, while surveying the channel, before journeying to Fort George and a reunion with the rest of the squadron. This prompted Wilkes to send the Vincennes to San Francisco Bay, while he continued to survey Grays Harbor.

From the area of modern-day Portland, Wilkes sent an overland party of 39 southwards, led by Emmons, but guided by Joseph Meek. The group included Agate, Eld, Colvocoresses, Brackenridge, Rich, Peale, Stearns, and Dana, and proceeded along an inland route to Fort Umpqua, Mount Shasta, the Sacramento River, John Sutter's New Helvetia, and then onwards to San Francisco Bay. They departed September 7, and arrived aboard the Vincennes in Sausalito on October 23, having traveled along the Siskiyou Trail.

Wilkes arrived with the Porpoise and Oregon, while the Flying Fish was to rendezvous with the squadron in Honolulu. The squadron surveyed San Francisco and its tributaries, and later produced a map of "Upper California". The expedition then headed back out on October 31, arriving Honolulu on November 17, and departing on November 28. They included a visit to Wake Island, and returned by way of the Philippines, Borneo, Singapore, Polynesia, and the Cape of Good Hope, reaching New York on June 10, 1842.

The expedition was plagued by poor relationships between Wilkes and his subordinate officers throughout. Wilkes' self-proclaimed status as captain and commodore, accompanied by the flying of the requisite pennant and the wearing of a captain's uniform while being commissioned only as a Lieutenant, rankled heavily with other members of the expedition of similar real rank. His apparent mistreatment of many of his subordinates, and cruel indulgence in punishments such as "flogging round the fleet" resulted in a major controversy on his return to America. Wilkes was court-martialled on his return, but was acquitted on all charges except that of illegally punishing men in his squadron.

== Significance ==
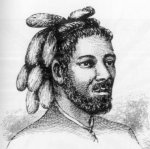
Nukufetau man, an 1841 portrait by Alfred Agate

The Wilkes Expedition played a major role in the development of 19th-century science, particularly in the growth of the American scientific establishment. Many of the species and other items collected by the expedition helped form the basis of collections at the new Smithsonian Institution.

With the help of the expedition's scientists, derisively called "clam diggers" and "bug catchers" by navy crew members, 280 islands, mostly in the Pacific, were explored, and over 800 miles (1,300 kilometers) of Oregon were mapped. Of no less importance, over 60,000 plant and bird specimens were collected. A staggering amount of data and specimens were taken during the expedition, including the seeds of 648 species, which were later traded, planted, and sent throughout the country. Dried specimens were sent to the National Herbarium, now a part of the Smithsonian Institution. There were also 254 live plants, which mostly came from the home stretch of the journey, that were placed in a newly constructed greenhouse in 1850, which later became the United States Botanic Garden.

Alfred Thomas Agate, an engraver and illustrator, created an enduring record of traditional cultures such as the illustrations made of the dress and tattoo patterns of indigenous peoples in the Ellice Islands in present-day Tuvalu.

A collection of artifacts from the expedition also went to the National Institute for the Promotion of Science, a precursor of the Smithsonian Institution. These joined artifacts from American history as the first artifacts in the Smithsonian collection.

=== Published works ===
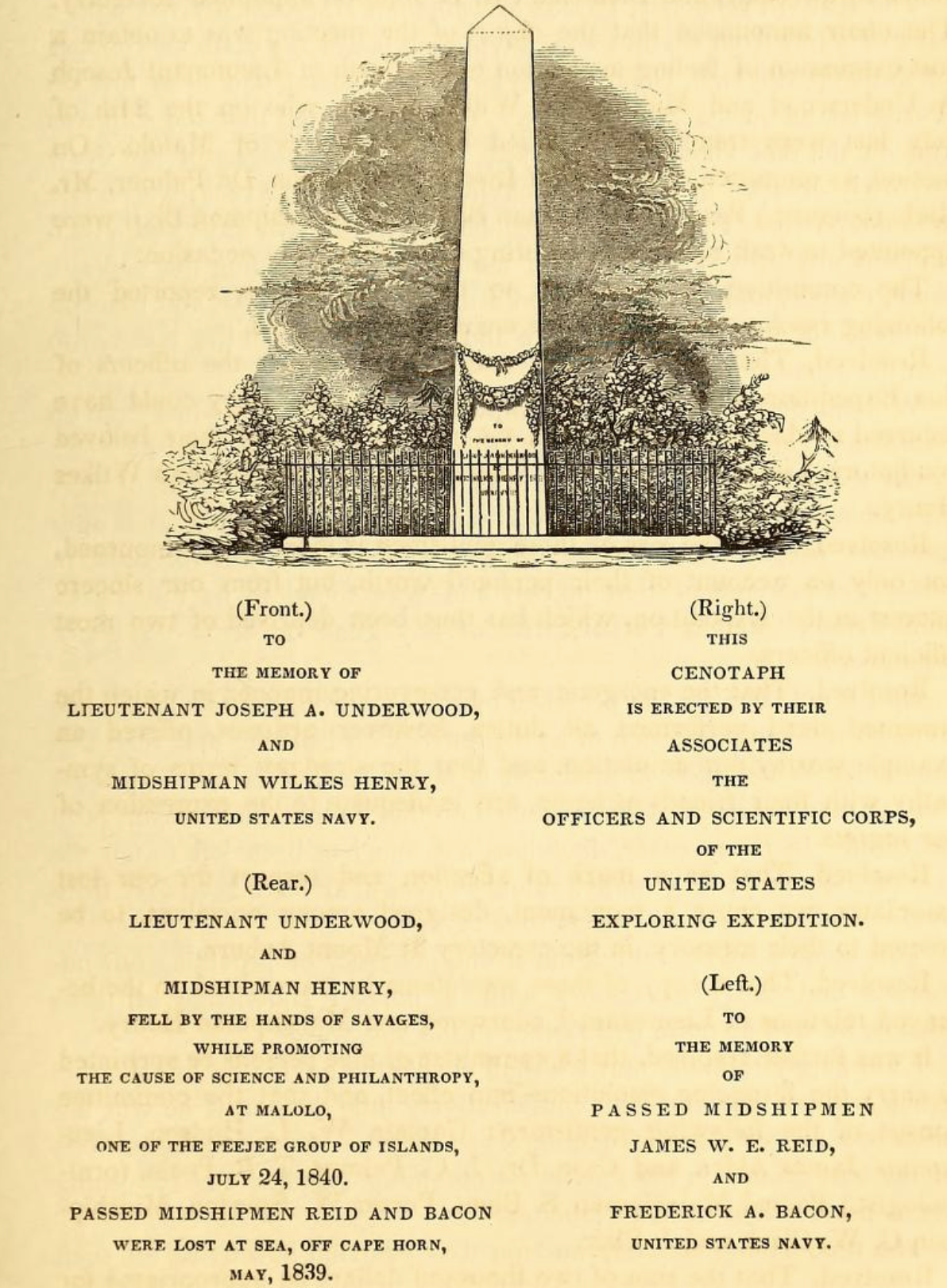
Monument to the Officers of the United States Exploring Expedition Mount Auburn Cemetery in Cambridge Massachusetts including Lieutenant Joseph Underwood and passed midshipman Henry Wilkes (Nephew of Charles Wilkes)

For a short time Wilkes was attached to the Office of Coast Survey, but from 1844 to 1861 he was chiefly engaged in preparing the expedition report. Twenty-eight volumes were planned, but only nineteen were published. Of these, Wilkes wrote the multi-volume Narrative of the United States exploring expedition, during 1838, 1839, 1840, 1841, 1842, Hydrography, and Meteorology.

The Narrative concerns the customs, political and economic conditions of many places then little-known to the Europeans. Other contributions were three reports by James Dwight Dana on Zoophytes, Geology, and Crustacea. In addition to shorter articles and reports, Wilkes published Western America, including California and Oregon, and Theory of the Winds. The Smithsonian Institution digitized the five volume narrative and the accompanying scientific volumes. The mismanagement that plagued the expedition prior to its departure continued after its completion. By June 1848, many of the stolen specimens had been lost or damaged and many remained unidentified. In 1848 Asa Gray was hired to work on the botanical specimens, and published the first volume of the report on botany in 1854, but Wilkes was unable to secure the funding for the second volume.

== See also ==
- European and American voyages of scientific exploration
- Vanderford Glacier
- Underwood Glacier
- Henry Island (Washington)
- Blair Glacier
- Hale Passage
- Holmes Glacier
- Vendovi Island
- Ringgold Isles

== Bibliography ==
- Adler, Antony (October 6, 2010). "From the Pacific to the Patent Office: The US Exploring Expedition and the origins of America's first national museum". Journal of the History of Collections. 23 (1) (published May 2011): 49–74. doi:10.1093/jhc/fhq002.
- Adler, Antony (2014). "The Capture and Curation of the Cannibal 'Vendovi': Reality and Representation of a Pacific Frontier". The Journal of Pacific History. 49 (3): 255–282. doi:10.1080/00223344.2014.914623. S2CID 162900603.
- Bagley, C. B. (1957). History of King County, Washington. S.J. Clarke Publishing Company.
- Barkan, F. B. (1987). The Wilkes Expedition: Puget Sound and the Oregon Country. Washington State Capital Museum.
- Bertrand, K. J. (1971). Americans in Antarctica, 1775–1948. American Geographical Society.
- Borthwick, D. E. (1965). Outfitting the United States Exploring Expedition: Lieutenant Charles Wilkes' European assignment. Lancaster Press.
- Brokenshire, D. (1993). Washington State Place Names: From Alki to Yelm. Caxton Press.
- Colvocoresses, G. M. (1855). Four years in the government exploring expedition. J.M. Fairchild.
- Dupree, A. H. (1988). Asa Gray, American Botanist, Friend of Darwin. Baltimore: Johns Hopkins University Press. ISBN 9780801837418.
- Ellsworth, H. A. (1934). One Hundred Eighty Landings of United States Marines 1800–1934. Vol. 1–2. Washington D.C.: U.S. Government Printing Office. ISBN 9781499740578.
- Goetzmann, W. H. (1986). New Lands, New Men – America And The Second Great Age Of Discovery. Viking. ISBN 9780670810680.
- Gray, Asa (1854). United States Exploring Expedition Botany. During the years 1838, 1839, 1840, 1841, 1842. Under the command of Charles Wilkes, U.S.N. Vol. XV. Botany. Phanerogamia, Part 1: With a Folio Atlas of One Hundred Plates. Philadelphia: C Sherman.
- Gurney, A. (2000). The Race to the White Continent: Voyages to the Antarctic. Norton.
- Haskell, D. C. (1968). The United States Exploring Expedition, 1838–1842 and Its Publications 1844–1874. Greenwood Press.
- Haskett, P. J. (1974). The Wilkes Expedition in Puget Sound, 1841. State Capitol Museum.
- Henderson, C. (1953). The Hidden Coasts: A Biography of Admiral Charles Wilkes. William Sloane Assoc.
- Jenkins, J. S. (1852). Voyage of the U.S. Exploring Squadron Commanded by Captain Charles Wilkes. Alden, Beardsley & Co.
- Jenkins, J. S. (1853). United States Exploring Expeditions: Voyage of the U.S. Exploring Squadron. Kerr, Doughty & Lapham.
- Jenkins, J. S. (1856). Explorations and Adventures in and about the Pacific and Antarctic Oceans. New York: Hurst & Company.
- Kruckeberg, A. R. (1995). The Natural History of Puget Sound Country. University of Washington Press.
- Mitterling, P. I. (1957). America in the Antarctic to 1840.
- Morgan, M.; Wilkes, D. (1981). Puget's Sound: A Narrative of Early Tacoma and the Southern Sound. University of Washington Press.
- Perry, F. (2002). Bremerton and Puget Sound Navy Yard. Perry Publishing.
- Philbrick, N. (2003). Sea of Glory: America's Voyage of Discovery, the U.S. Exploring Expedition, 1838–1842. Viking Adult. ISBN 0-670-03231-X.
  - Philbrick, Nathaniel (October 26, 2004a). Sea of Glory: America's Voyage of Discovery, The U.S. Exploring Expedition, 1838-1842. Penguin Books. ISBN 978-0142004838.
- Philbrick, N. (January 2004b). "Learn More About the U.S. Exploring Expedition". Smithsonian Libraries.
- Pickering, C. (1863). The geographical distribution of animals and plants. Trübner and Company.
- Poesch, J. P. (1961). Titian Ramsay Peale And His Journals of The Wilkes Expedition, 1799–1885. American Philosophical Society.
- Reynolds, W.; Philbrick, N. (2004). The Private Journal of William Reynolds: United States Exploring Expedition, 1838–1842. Penguin Classics.
- Ritter, H. (2003). Washington's History: The People, Land, and Events of the Far Northwest. Westwinds Press.
- Schwantes, C. A. (2000). The Pacific Northwest: An Interpretive History. University of Nebraska Press.
- Sellers, C. C. (1980). Mr. Peale's Museum. W. W. Norton & Company. ISBN 9780393057003.
- Stanton, W. R. (1975). The Great United States Exploring Expedition of 1838–1842. Berkeley: University of California Press. ISBN 9780520025578.
- Tyler, D. B. (1968). The Wilkes Expedition: The First United States Exploring Expedition (1838–1842). American Philosophical Society.
- Viola, H. J.; Margolis, C. (1985). Magnificent Voyagers: The U.S. Exploring Expedition, 1838–1842. Smithsonian.
- Wilkes, C. (1844). Narrative of the United States Exploring Expedition. Vol. 1–5. Philadelphia: C. Sherman. Archived from the original on September 20, 2003.
- Wilkes, C. (1845). Narrative of the United States Exploring Expedition during the years 1838, 1839, 1840, 1841, 1842. Vol. 1–5. Philadelphia: Lea and Blanchard. OCLC 1055695672.
  - Wilkes, Charles N. (1845a). Narrative of the U.S. Exploring Expedition. Vol. 1 (unregistered ed.). Philadelphia: Lea & Blanchard – via Smithsonian Libraries.
- Wilkes, C. (1851). Voyage round the world, Embracing the principal events of the narrative of the United States Exploring Expedition. G.P. Putnam.
- "United States Exploring Expedition 1838–1842". Records of the United States Exploring Expedition. Harvard University Herbaria – Botany Libraries Archives Gray Herbarium. June 2009. Archived from the original on June 15, 2021.
