= Frederick Styles Agate =

American painter (1803–1844)

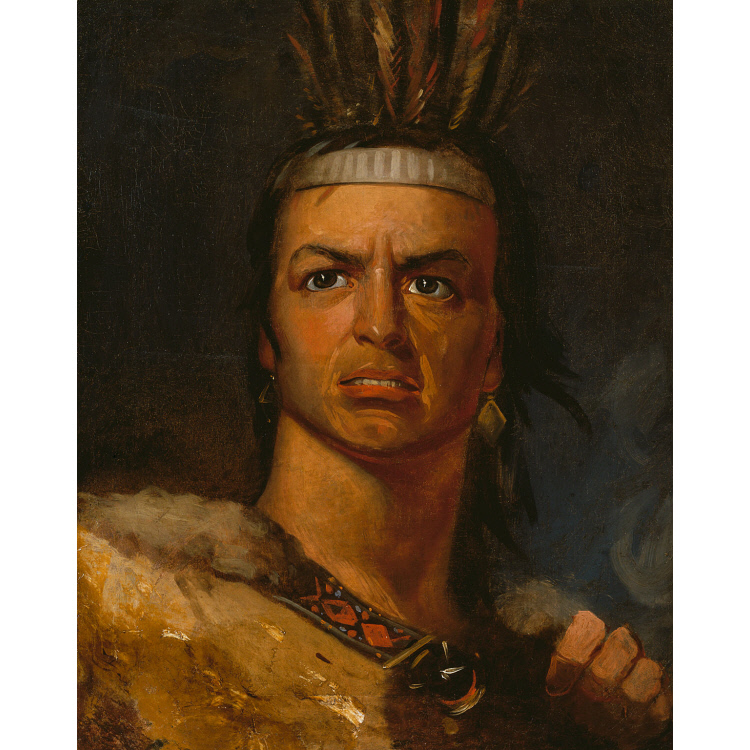
Portrait of Edwin Forrest, in the role of Metamora

Frederick Styles Agate (29 January 1803 – 1 May 1844) was a painter best known for his paintings Ugolino and Old Oaken Bucket.

== Life and work ==
He was born to Thomas Agate and his British wife, Hannah Agate in the Sparta, neighborhood of Ossining, New York in 1803, although some sources give the year as 1807.] Frederick was the brother of another noted painter, Alfred Thomas Agate. At the age of 15, he moved to New York City to study painting under John Rubens Smith.

In 1825, with his friend Thomas S. Cummings, he left Smith to study under Samuel F. B. Morse at the National Academy of Fine Arts in New York City. Agate and Cummings led the movement which resulted in the formation of the National Academy of Design.

Beginning in 1827, he worked as a historical and portrait painter at 152 Broadway in New York City. His work is described as being semi-religious and moralistic. He went to Paris and Florence in 1834–1835, returning home to Sparta, New York, where he died in 1844, aged 41 of tuberculosis.

He is buried in Sparta Cemetery, next to his sister Harriet Agate Carmichael. As of 2019, his headstone has gone missing.

== Sources ==
- Who Was Who in America: Historical Volume, 1607-1896. Chicago: Marquis Who's Who, 1963.
- Frederick Styles Agate's biography at AskART
