= USS Flying Fish (1838) =

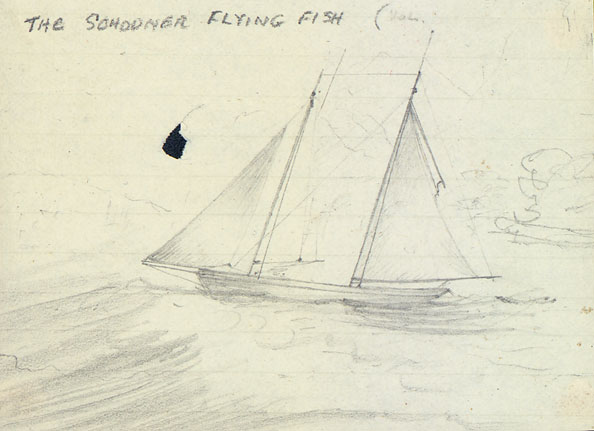
- The Flying Fish as drawn by Alfred Thomas Agate

History

United States
- Name: USS Flying Fish
- Namesake: Flying Fish
- Builder: Jabex & Williams
- Launched: 11 March 1837
- Acquired: 3 August 1838
- In service: 12 August 1838
- Out of service: 26 February 1842
- Renamed: From Independence to Flying Fish
- Fate: Sold

General characteristics
- Displacement: 96 tons
- Length: 85 ft 6 in (26.06 m)
- Beam: 22 ft 6 in (6.86 m)
- Sail plan: 34 ft 6 in (10.52 m) maintop mast
- Complement: 15
- Armament: 2 guns

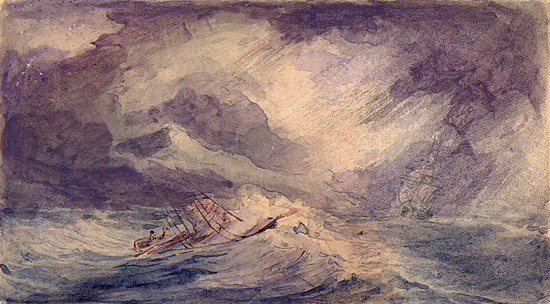
The Flying Fish in a gale, as drawn by Alfred Thomas Agate

USS Flying Fish was formerly the New York City pilot boat schooner Independence. Purchased by the United States Navy at New York City on 3 August 1838 and upon joining her squadron in Hampton Roads on 12 August 1838, she was placed under command of Passed Midshipman S. R. Knox.

== Construction and service ==
The Independence was built as a civilian schooner-rigged pilot boat built on 11 March 1837 by Jabex & Williams shipyard. She was purchased by the United States Navy on 3 August 1838 and renamed Flying Fish.

Assigned as a tender in the U.S. Exploring Expedition of 1838–42 commanded by Lieutenant Charles Wilkes, Flying Fish sailed with her squadron 19 August 1838 to visit Madeira and Rio de Janeiro while bound for Tierra del Fuego, where the squadron arrived early in 1839. From this point, the squadron made its first cruises toward the Antarctic Continent, which it was to discover later the same year after surveys among Pacific islands and a visit to Australia.

After the second penetration of the Antarctic, the squadron rendezvoused in New Zealand in April 1840 to survey Pacific islands northward toward the Hawaiians, where the ships were repaired late in the year. Flying Fish sailed with USS Peacock to resurvey some of the Samoan, Ellice, Kingsmill, and Pescadore Islands before joining the main body of the squadron on the northwest coast of America in July 1841. Flying Fish made surveys in the Columbia River and around Vancouver, then proceeded to San Francisco, from which the squadron sailed 1 November for the south Pacific. Arriving in the Philippines in mid-January 1842 Flying Fish and the other ships separated to cruise the Sulu Seas, then make a planned rendezvous at Singapore in February.

== End of service ==
When the expedition stopped in Singapore on their way home, it was discovered the Flying Fish was suffering from structural problems and was unfit for further service. It was sold to an English resident for $3,700 on 24 February, 1842. The rest of the squadron sailed for home on 26 February. There are rumors that the Flying Fish was repurposed to smuggle opium, although there does not appear to be any recorded evidence of this.

== See also ==
- Bombardment of Upolu
- Battle of Drummond's Island
- List of Northeastern U.S. pilot boats
