= Henry Island (Washington) =

Island in Washington, United States

Coordinates: 48.603°N 123.186°W

Henry Island is one of the San Juan Islands of San Juan County, Washington, United States. It lies just off the northwest shore of San Juan Island. It consists of two ridges – one 3 miles (4.8 km) long, the other about half as long – connected by a sand bar, giving the appearance of the letter H on maps. The small Pearl Island also lies between Henry Island and San Juan Island at its northern end. Just northwest of the northern tip of Henry Island lies Battleship Island, a state bird sanctuary. Except for Stuart Island, Henry Island is the westernmost of the San Juan Islands. It has a land area of 4.126 km^{2} (1.593 sq mi) and had a total of 19 permanent residents as of the 2010 census.

Henry Island was named by the Wilkes Expedition in 1841 for Charles Wilkes' nephew Henry Wilkes, who was killed in 1840 during a skirmish in Fiji.
