= William L. Hudson =

US Navy officer (1794–1862)

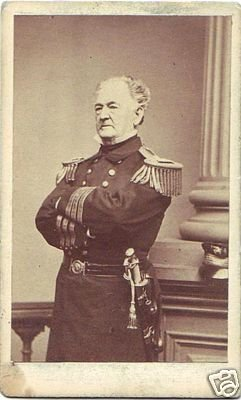
- Born: May 11, 1794; Brooklyn, New York, U.S.
- Died: October 15, 1862 (aged 68); Brooklyn, New York, U.S.
- Military career
- Allegiance: United States of America
- Branch: United States Navy
- Service years: 1815–1862
- Rank: Captain
- Commands: USS Peacock USS Vincennes; USS Niagara Boston Navy Yard
- Conflicts: Second Barbary War Aegean Sea Anti-Piracy Operations; United States Exploring Expedition: Battle of Malolo; Bombardment of Upolu; Battle of Drummond's Island; Mexican–American War American Civil War

Captain William Levereth Hudson, USN (11 May 1794 – 15 October 1862) was a United States Navy officer in the first half of the 19th century.

== Career ==
Hudson was born 11 May 1794 in Brooklyn. His first service afloat was in the Mediterranean Squadron under Commodore William Bainbridge in the schooner Alert and sloop-of-war Ontario from 1815 to 1817.

Hudson was appointed midshipman 1 January 1816. In 1821–1823, he served in Dolphin on the Pacific coast of South America, and in Warren for a Mediterranean cruise 1826–1829. In 1830–1831, Hudson accompanied Lieutenant Ramsey on a tour to Russia, and then assumed duty at the New York Navy Yard.

In June 1838 he was ordered to command Peacock, attached to Commander Charles Wilkes's exploring expedition, second in command overall. After strenuous service in the Antarctic, the South Seas, and along the coast of North America, Peacock was wrecked 18 July 1841 while attempting to cross the bar and enter the Columbia River on Wilkes' orders. Commander Hudson made every effort to free his ship but was forced to leave her, saving all his men and the scientific papers.

In September 1849, after shore and lighthouse duty, he was ordered to command Vincennes, cruising the Pacific until 1852. In March 1857 Hudson, appointed captain 8 October 1855, assumed command of Niagara. That August, in conjunction with British ships, he made the first attempt at laying a transatlantic cable. This try was unsuccessful, but a second attempt met with success 10 August 1858. After commanding the Boston Navy Yard in 1858–1862, Captain Hudson was made Inspector of the 3d Light House District. He died 15 October 1862 in Brooklyn, aged 68.

== Namesakes ==
Three ships have been named USS Hudson in his honor.

== See also ==
- European and American voyages of scientific exploration
