= George F. Emmons =

American naval officer (1811–1884)

George Foster Emmons
- Born: August 23, 1811; Clarendon, Vermont, U.S.
- Died: July 23, 1884 (aged 72); Princeton, New Jersey, U.S.
- Burial place: Green Mount Cemetery, Baltimore, Maryland
- Military career
- Allegiance: United States of America
- Branch: United States Navy
- Service years: 1828–1873
- Rank: Rear Admiral
- Commands: Ossipee
- Conflicts: Mexican–American War; American Civil War

George Foster Emmons (August 23, 1811 – July 23, 1884) was a rear admiral of the United States Navy, who served in the early to mid 19th century.

== Biography ==
He was born in Clarendon, Vermont, on August 23, 1811. Emmons began his distinguished career as a midshipman on April 1, 1828.

As a lieutenant aboard the Peacock he participated in the Wilkes Exploring Expedition of 1838 to 1842, which discovered the Antarctic Continent, and throughout the South Seas.

He was assigned command of the expedition's overland party conducting surveys and exploration from Puget Sound south to San Francisco. He served with great honor in the Mexican and Civil Wars. As commander of the Ossipee from 1867 to 1868, he carried to Alaska the commissioners who took formal possession for the United States. He became commodore in 1868, chief of the Hydrographic Office in 1870, and rear admiral in 1872. As a Rear Admiral, he commanded the Philadelphia Navy Yard until his retirement in 1873. Rear Admiral Emmons died in Princeton, New Jersey, on July 23, 1884, at the age of 82. He is buried in Green Mount Cemetery, Baltimore, Maryland.

== Namesake ==
In 1941, the Gleaves-class destroyer USS Emmons (DD-457) was named in his honor.
