= Passed midshipman =

Historical naval rank

A passed midshipman, sometimes called as "midshipman, passed", is a term used historically in the 19th century to describe a midshipman who had passed the lieutenant's exam and was eligible for promotion to lieutenant as soon as there was a vacancy in that grade.

== Royal Navy ==
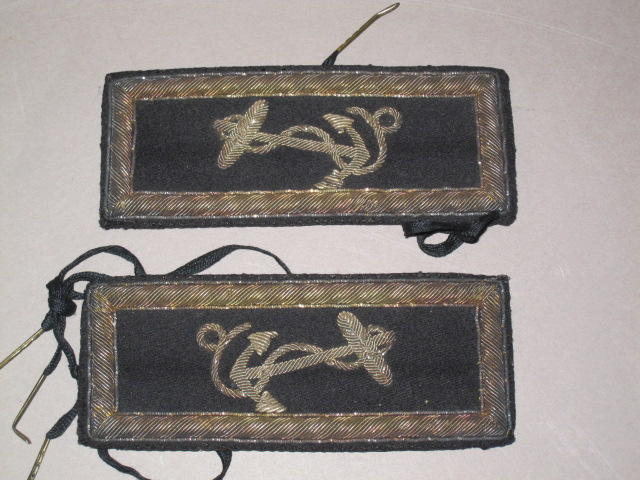
Shoulder straps used by passed midshipman T.R. Young on the USS Brandywine. The shoulder straps were tied on to the uniform coat with shoe strings. The straps are circa 1860s.

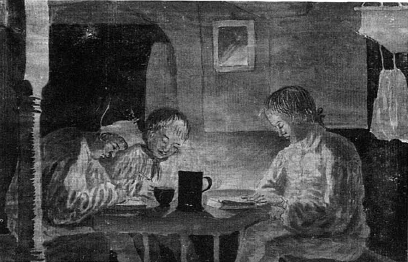
Midshipmen studying for their Lieutenant's examination aboard HMS Pallas. Sketch by Gabriel Bray, 1774

Passed midshipman was never an official rank or rating in the Royal Navy, but was commonly used to describe midshipmen who had passed the lieutenant examination but were waiting on a roster to be commissioned. Between 1800 and 1815, due to a shortage of officers to command small craft, passed midshipmen were titled sub-lieutenant but this also was not an official rank.

Passed midshipmen awaiting promotion often elected to become master's mate, an experienced seaman role as assistant to the master. Though formally the rating did not lead to promotion to lieutenant, master's mates were paid more than any other rating and were the only ratings allowed to command any sort of vessel. A midshipman who became master's mate earned an increase in pay from £2 15s to £3 16s per month, but initially reduced his chances at a commission. Over time, however, an appointment of master's mate became considered a normal part of the path to a commission; the situation caused some confusion during the last part of the 18th century, when two parallel roles – master's mates trying to become masters, and former midshipmen working toward a commission – held the same title and responsibilities aboard ship.

By the first years of the 19th century, the prefix "master's" was dropped for passed midshipmen, to distinguish them from master's mates in the navigator's branch. In 1824 two further grades were also introduced, consisting of master's assistants and second-class volunteers. These corresponded to midshipmen and first-class volunteers respectively in the executive line. From this point, passed midshipmen had the rating master's mate, abbreviated as mate, and prospective masters had the rating master's assistant. These changes helped eliminate the confusion caused by the mingling of midshipmen in the navigator's branch. In 1838 a Royal Commission, presided over by the Duke of Wellington, recommended the institution of the rank of mate as an official step between midshipman and lieutenant. In 1861 mate was abolished in favor of sub-lieutenant.

== United States Navy ==
Passed midshipman was first used in 1819, and unlike the Royal Navy was an official rank of the United States Navy. With the establishment of the rank of ensign in 1862, the ranking structure was changed. The term midshipman came to mean an officer that passed his exams, while a cadet midshipman was one that had not or was still an undergraduate. A passed midshipman would be appointed a commission to the rank of ensign, rather than lieutenant.
