= Alfred Thomas Agate =

American painter and botanical illustrator

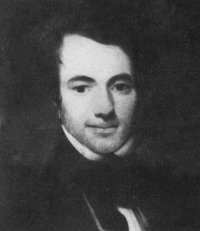
- Self-portrait
- Born: February 14, 1812; Sparta, Ossining New York
- Died: January 5, 1846 (aged 33); Washington, D.C.
- Known for: Painting, Miniature

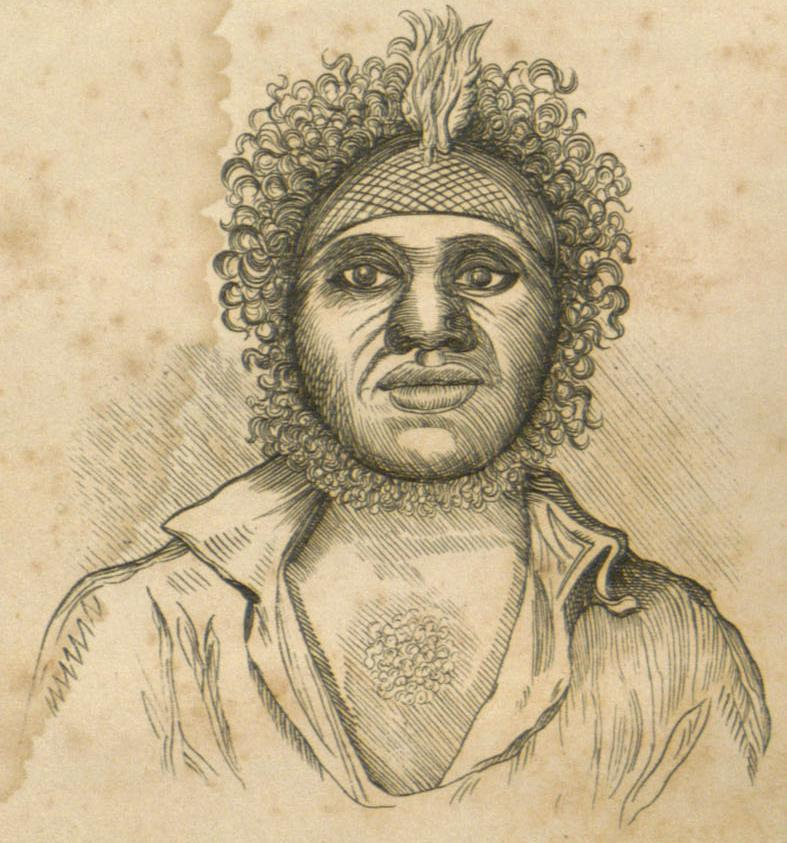
Agate's portrait of Biraban, from L. E. Threlkeld's book A Key to the Structure of the Aboriginal Language, published in 1850

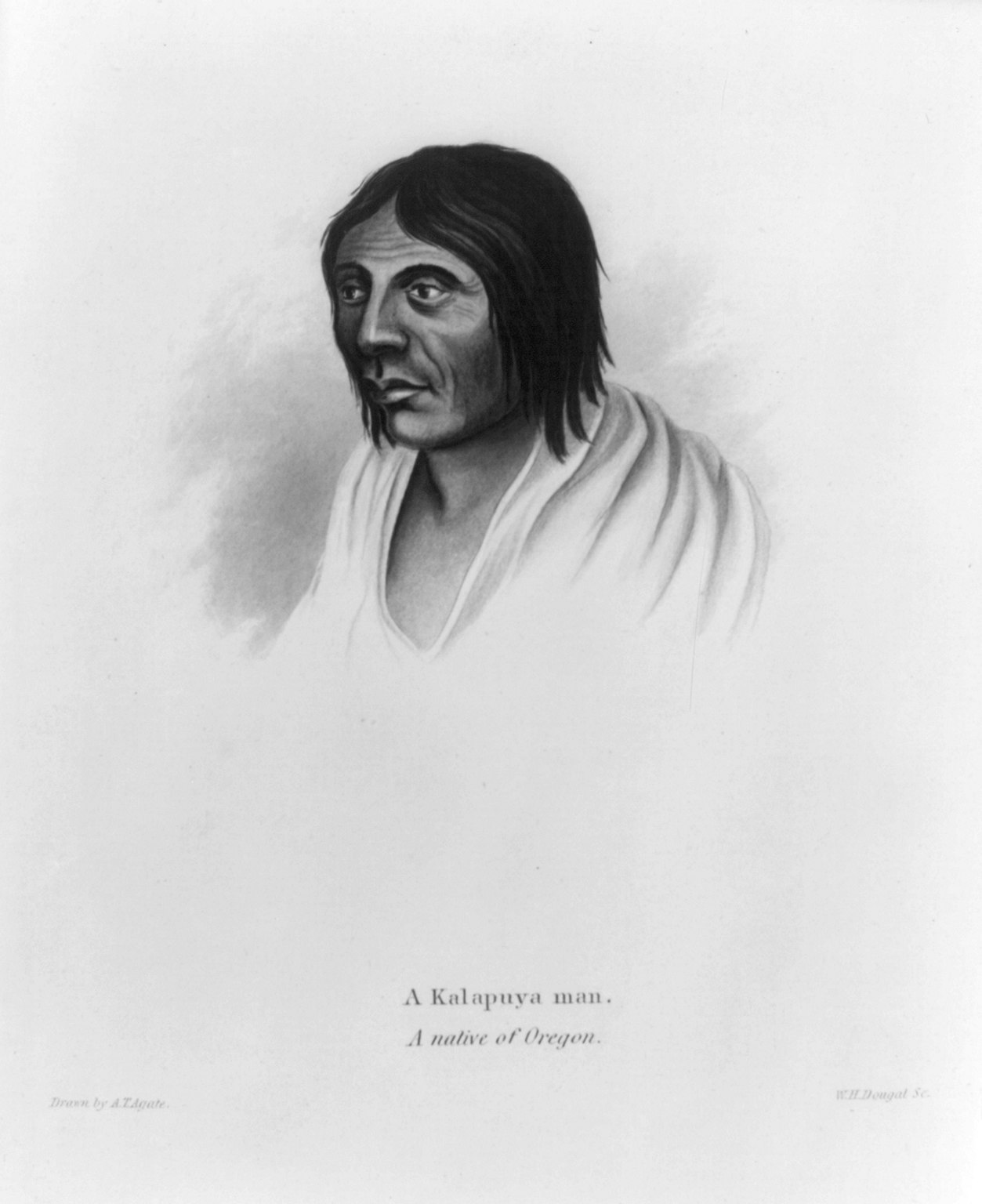
Agate's portrait of a Kalapuya man, sketched in Oregon during the United States Exploring Expedition.

Alfred Thomas Agate (February 14, 1812 – January 5, 1846) was an American painter and miniaturist.

Agate lived in New York from 1831 to 1838, where he studied with his brother, Frederick Styles Agate, a portrait and historical painter. He later went on to study with Thomas Seir Cummings. By the late 1830s, Agate was exhibiting his work at the National Academy of Design in New York, and had established himself as a skilled painter in oils. He was elected into the National Academy of Design as an honorary member in 1840.

Agate drew landscapes, portraits, and scientific illustrations. For much of his landscapes, Agate used a camera lucida, a device which projected the scene onto a piece of paper for purposes of tracing.

== Expedition ==
Agate created many artworks during his service with the United States Exploring Expedition of 1838–1842 under Charles Wilkes. He was especially good at botanical illustrations, and was the designated portrait and botanical artist of the expedition.

The United States Exploring Expedition passed through the Ellice Islands and visited Funafuti, Nukufetau and Vaitupu in 1841. During the visit of the expedition to the Ellice Islands (now known as Tuvalu) Alfred Thomas Agate recorded the dress and tattoo patterns of men of Nukufetau.

Agate created the first known picture of Mount Shasta. Agate contributed more than half (173 of 342) of the sketches and paintings reproduced as lithographs illustrating the five volumes of the expedition's reports. He sketched the Oregon Territory, including a look into a Chinook Lodge, an Indian Burial Place, an Indian Mode of Rocking Cradle, and a picture of the wreck of one of the expedition's sailing ships at the mouth of the Columbia River.

== After the expedition ==
Agate lived in Washington, D.C., from 1842 onward, but his health suffered severely from the expedition and he died four years later of consumption.

On Agate's death in 1846, the drawings passed to his widow, Elizabeth Hill Kennedy Agate, who later married Dr. William J. C. Du Hamel of Washington, D.C. In 1926, one of her daughters from this marriage, Elizabeth A. Du Hamel, sold them to the Naval Historical Foundation. The Naval Historical Foundation donated Agate's artwork to the Navy Art Collection in 1998.

== Namesakes ==
In 1841, Agate Passage near Bainbridge Island, Washington, was named by Lt. Charles Wilkes in honor of Agate. Agate Island in Fiji was also named in honor of Agate. Botanist Asa Gray used Agate's drawings and the expedition's specimens for botanical reports, and named a violet, Agatea violaris, after him.

== Gallery ==
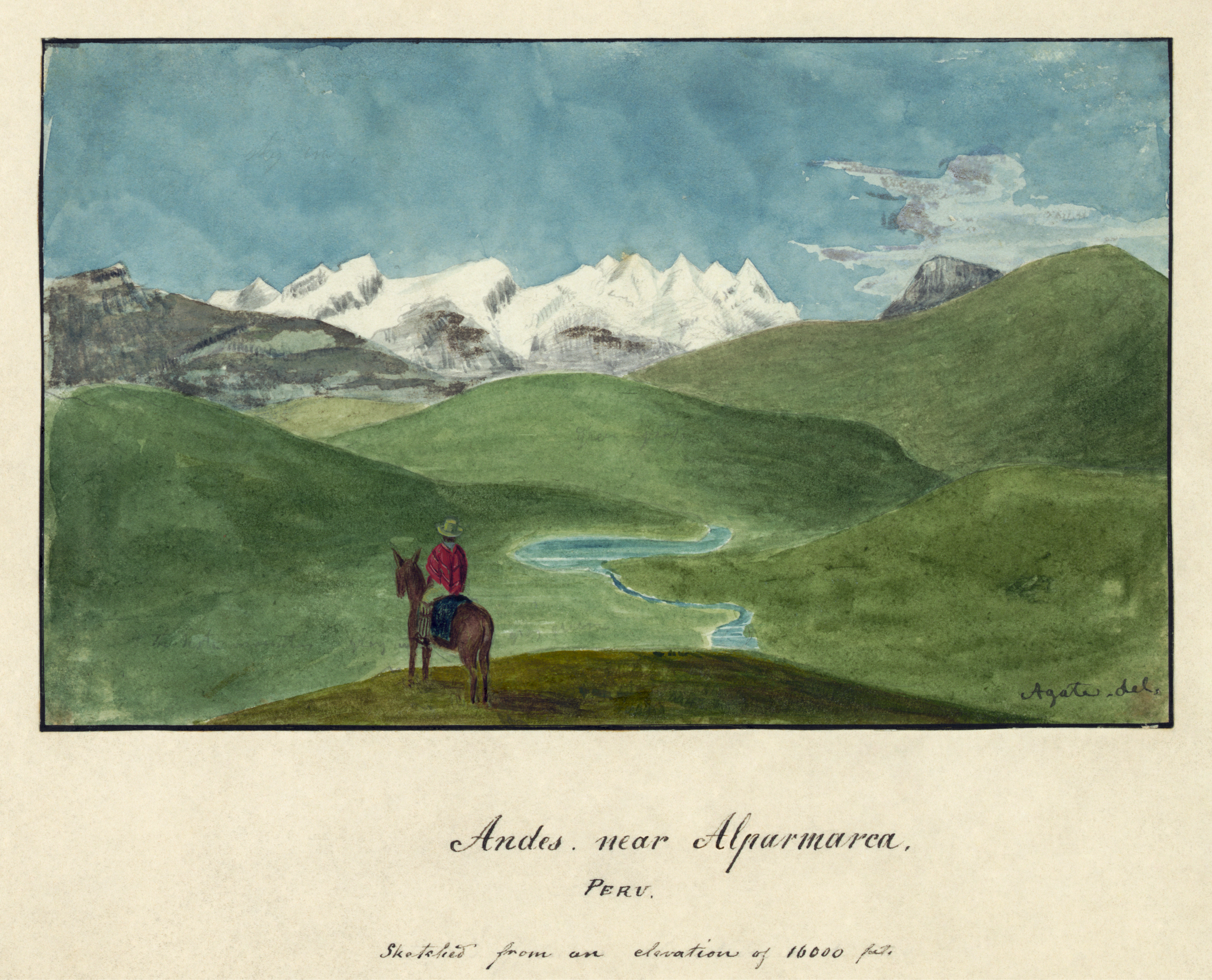
"Andes near Alparmarca, Peru: Sketched from an Elevation of 16,000 Feet", illustration from the South American portion of the United States Exploring Expedition, digitally restored

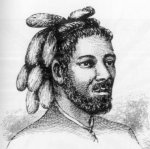
A man from the Nukufetau atoll, Ellice Islands (now Tuvalu) 1841

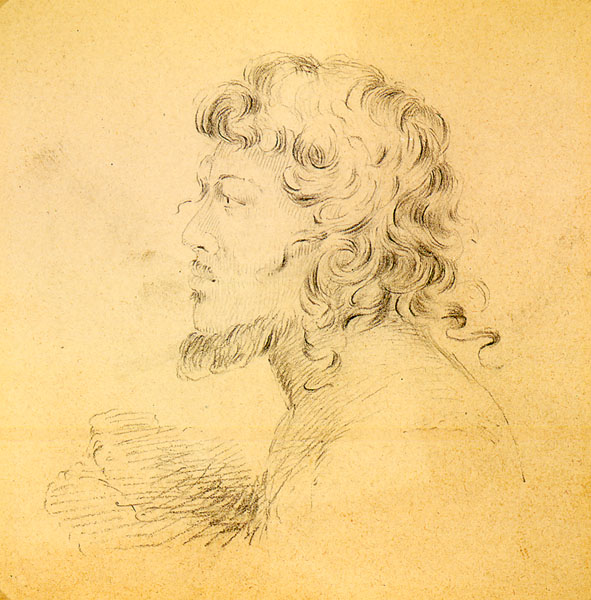
Portrait of a native of the Gilbert Islands (then called the Kingsmill Islands), 1841

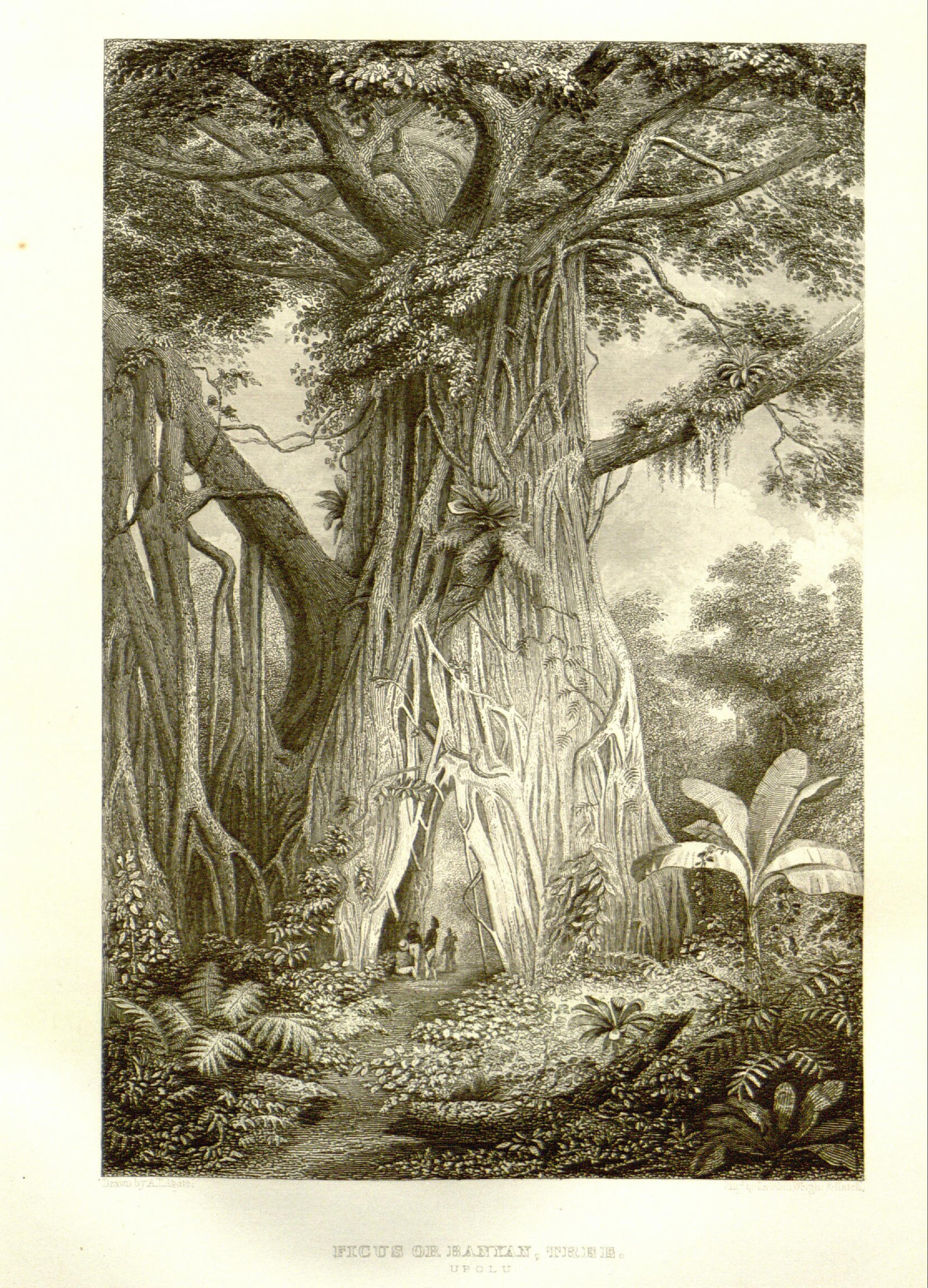
Illustration of a Ficus in Samoa

== Bibliography ==
- Gray, Asa (May 4, 1852). "Agatea Nov. Gen.". Proceedings of the American Academy of Arts and Sciences. 2: 323–324.
- "United States Exploring Expedition 1838-1842". Records of the United States Exploring Expedition. Harvard University Herbaria - Botany Libraries Archives Gray Herbarium. June 2009. Archived from the original on June 15, 2021. (Contains botanical illustrations)
- Who Was Who in America: Historical Volume 1607–1896. Chicago: Marquis Who's Who, 1963.
