= 1840 Fiji expedition =

1840 American research expedition

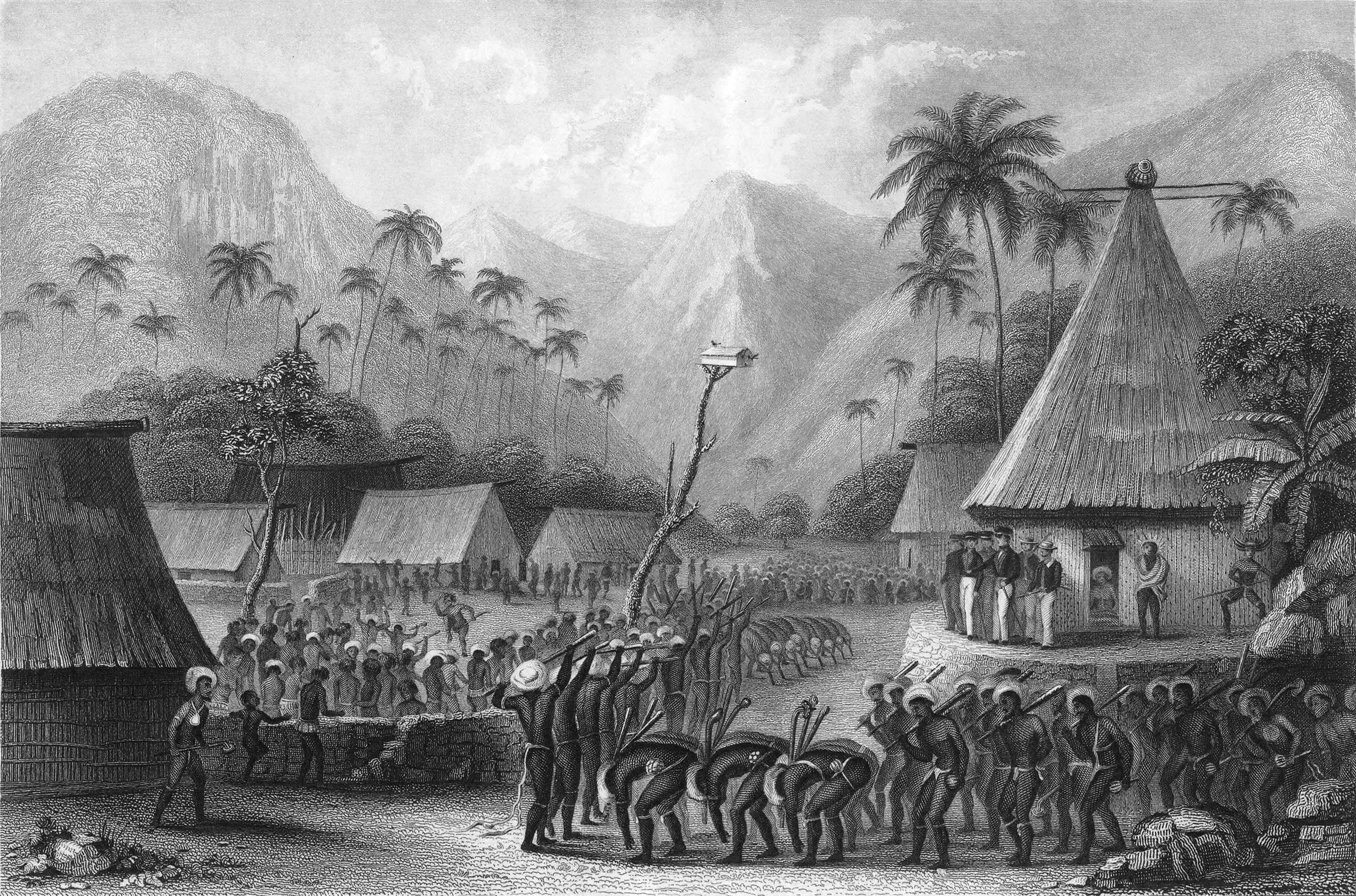
"Club Dance" being performed by around 100 Fijians, bearing a variety of clubs, while in the center of the gathering a Fijian "clown" performs, watched by American sailors, at Levuka village, surrounded by coconut palms and one banana palm, with tall hills in the background. The dance was held in honor of the United States Exploring Expedition on June 24th 1840. (Sketch made by Joseph Drayton)

The Fiji Expedition of 1840 was an exploring and surveying expedition, which itself was a part of the wider United States Exploring Expedition (a.k.a. the Wilkes expedition or the U.S. Ex. Ex.) that occurred from May 4 to August 11, 1840. It produced several scientific and cultural breakthroughs in realms such as cartography, oceanography, volcanology, anthropology, ethnography, ethnology, philology, linguistics, geology, taxonomy, trade, diplomacy, toponymy, epidemiology, pathology and Christian missionary work. It also was known for two separate punitive expeditions against separate groups of Fijians.

== Background ==
The Ex. Ex. under the command of Lieutenant Charles Wilkes had just discovered that Antarctica was a continent, and finished surveying Wilkes Land. However, Wilkes was facing a significant deadline. Wilkes was originally given a deadline of 3 years to conduct the necessary research for all the allotted study location goals for the expedition. Unfortunately for him he only had two months to conduct the studies for Fiji expedition, then he would immediately have to journey to the Columbia river expeditions to finish the rest of the studies for the rest of the year. If Wilkes did not, the sailors' and marines' enlistment service would expire, and the expedition's future would have been put in jeopardy.

This situation put Wilkes under immense pressure. As it was, besides the Columbia river expedition, the Fiji expedition was considered the most paramount research destination for several reasons. New England merchants and whalers frequented Fiji for its whale and sandalwood, and competed with the British and the French for the bêche-de-mer populations to sell in China. However, Fiji possessed many uncharted reefs, rocks, and currents, with a culture well known for its cannibalism (in fact for a while Fiji was also known as the Cannibal Isles) and a noted penchant for dragging boats to shore and killing all on board. No dependable navigation charts existed, and in the 12 years prior to 1840, 8 ships (5 of them being American) had been destroyed in the area. These conditions made travel to and around these Islands so precarious, the East India Marine Society of Salem, Massachusetts, United States had petitioned the federal government for local charts for sailors navigating these waters.

Although surveying was the primary reason for the Ex. Ex. in general, the Ex. Ex. also brought along a group of scientists which were also deployed for the Fiji expedition.

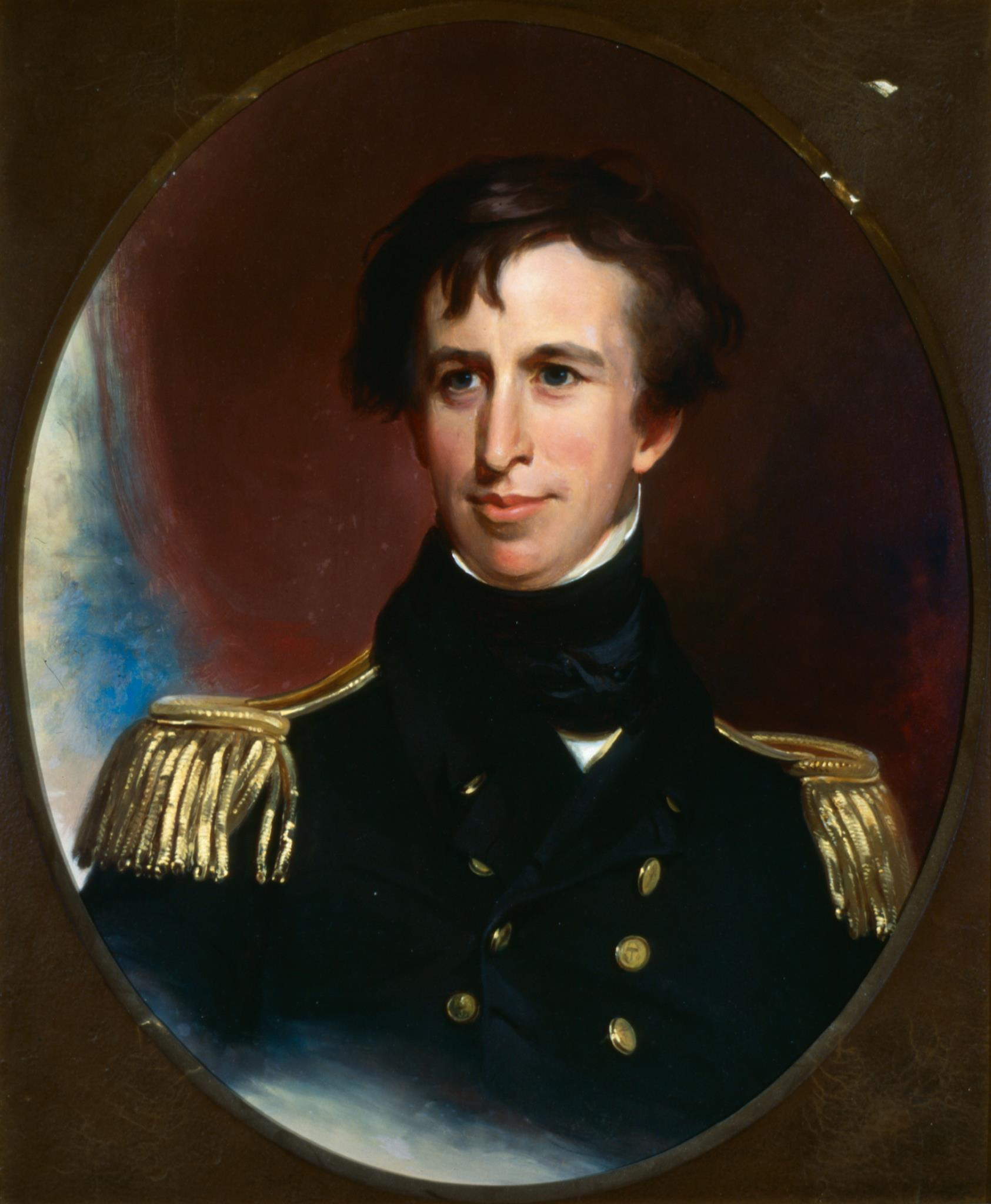
A Portrait of Charles Wilkes

Now that the Antarctic discoveries were finished, Wilkes' fleet traveled to Sydney, Australia, then to the Bay of Islands, New Zealand, and finally they rendezvoused at Tongatapu, in Tonga, and prepared for their next mission in Fiji. Wilkes had already had his four ships refitted at Sydney. His current fleet at the time of the Fiji expedition consisted of Wilkes' flagship the USS Vincennes (sloop-of-war, 780 tons, 18 guns), the USS Peacock (sloop-of-war, 650 tons, 22 guns), the USS Porpoise (brig, 230 tons, 10 guns), and the USS Flying Fish (schooner, 96 tons, 2 guns). Furthermore, Wilkes had at least a dozen gigs, cutters, and whaleboats prepared for travel against the hazardous reefs. Each of the vessels were given surveying equipment and a supply of forward mounted blunderbusses, and a number of them were furnished with congreve rocket artillery frames.Wilkes believed he was going to lose at least two ships and his officers wrote their wills to their loved ones for fear at the prospect of being shipwrecked or cannibalized.

== Beginning of the expedition ==
Wilkes' fleet set sail out of Nukuʻalofa on May 4, 1840. He dispatched the Porpoise under Lieutenant Cadwalader Ringgold to the Lau Group of the Fiji Islands, while the rest of the fleet went to the Koro Sea. The 3 ships headed for the Island of Ovalau, but by the morning of May 7, the Flying Fish under the command of Lieutenant George Sinclair went missing, after it got caught on a reef. Wilkes pressed on with the Peacock and the Vincennes and anchored by the village Levuka.

Upon Wilkes arrival, a white shipwrecked survivor of the Oneo a Nantucket man named David Whippey and one of his sons paddled up to the Vincennes. Whippey was what was called a beachcomber, which in this context meant a "tame white man" to the Fijians. This was a sort of mercenary, military advisor, and translator. The earliest beachcomber Charlie Savage and those like him taught Fijians how to use fire arms. This revolutionized Fijian warfare, and they were greatly valued by war chiefs, who rewarded them with riches and women. Whippey had risen to the title of "Mata-ki-Bau" (the Royal Messenger of Bau village.

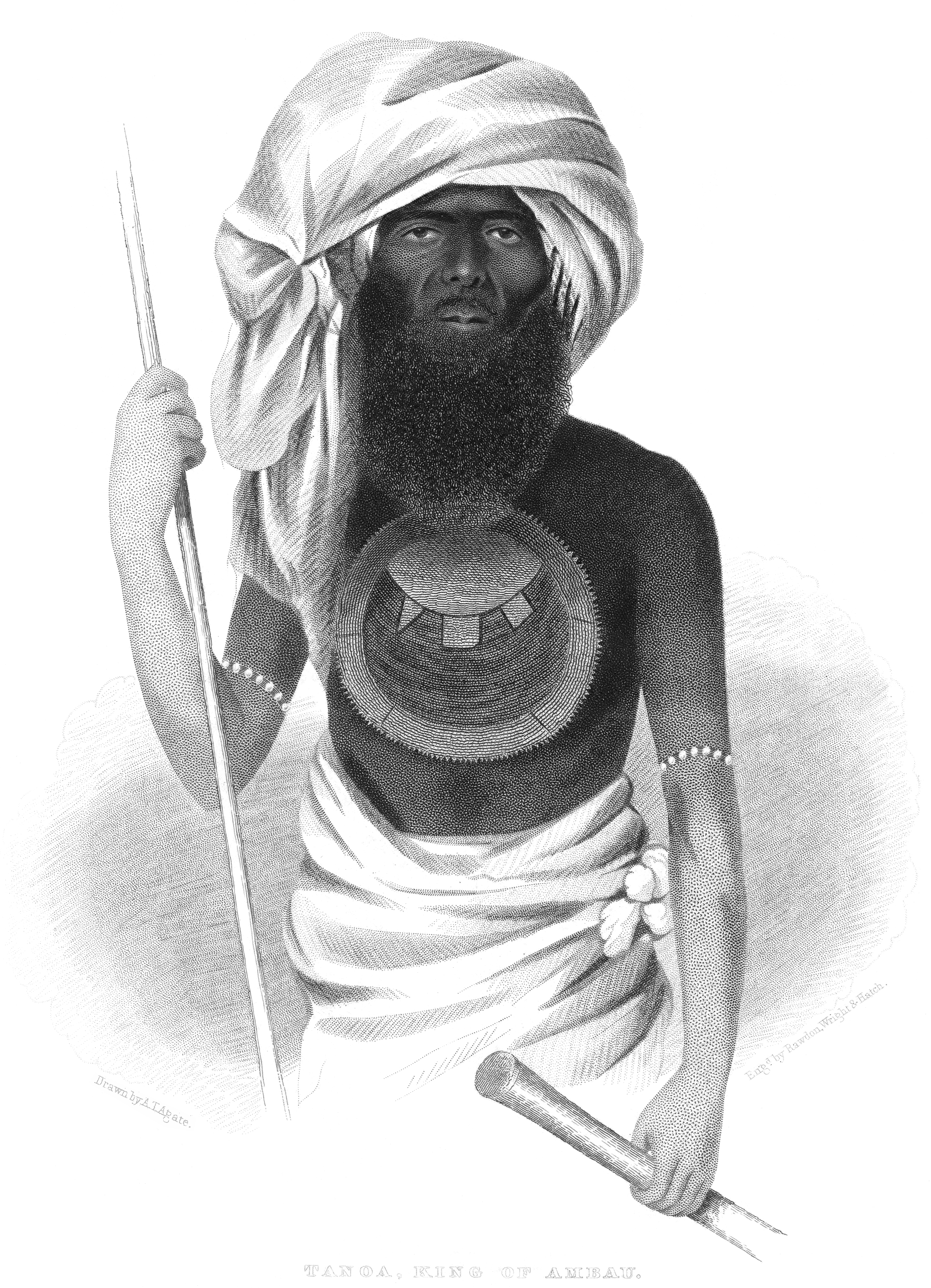
Ratu Tanoa Visawaqa (drawing by Alfred Thomas Agate, US Exploring Expedition)

Wilkes arranged for Whippey to have him meet the chief or "Tu'i" of Levuku. Wilkes bestowed several gifts upon the chief, who in gratitude and with Whippey's aid sent a message to Tanoa high King Vunivalu of Bau (called "Old Snuff by the local whites) and head of the notorious Lasakau sea warriors, and asked to meet with him. After a messenger was sent, Whippey took Wilkes and 25 of his officers and naturalists (including the commander of the Peacock Lieutenant William L. Hudson and Navy Geographer and passed midshipman Henry Eld), along with an entourage of natives, on a tour and hike of Mount Nadelaiovalau (Note: Wilkes calls this Mountain "Andulong".). At the top of the mountain Wilkes and his scientists could clearly see the surrounding area including nearby reefs and other nearby landmarks. The group set out right away making charts, sketches, measurements for recording, and collecting plant and animal specimens.

On May 8 Wilkes deployed two surveying parties on boats. One was to be led by Lieutenant James Alden Jr. who would leave Ovalau to explore the northern shore of Viti Levu Island. The second boat was led by Lieutenant George F. Emmons, who in turn scouted the south shore. Wilkes gave the officer further orders that after exploring their respective shores that they should assemble at the Island of Malolo which was to the west of Viti Levu. That same day Lieutenant Sinclair arrived with the Flying Fish at Levuka and reported to Wilkes.

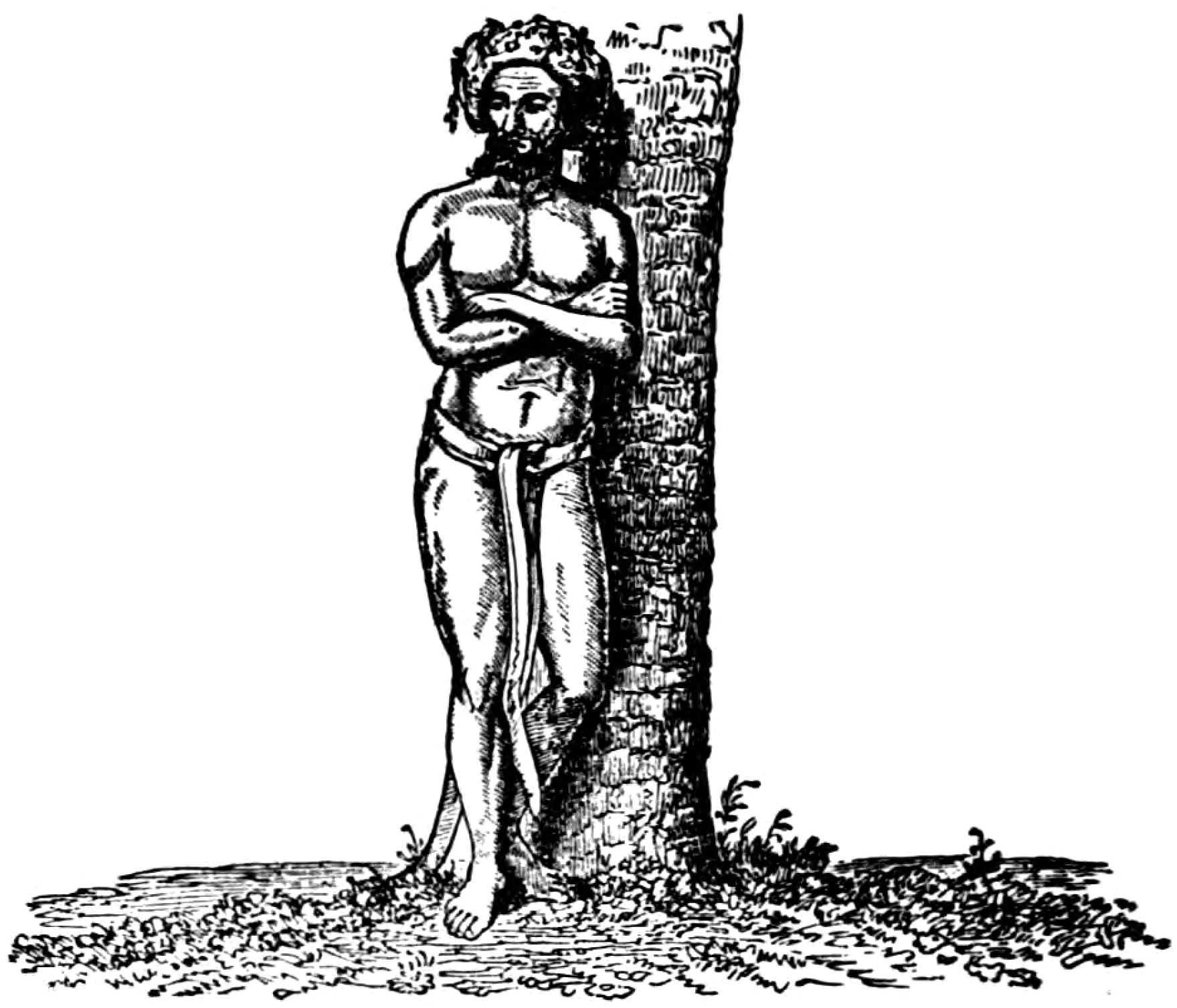
CHIEF TUI LEVUKA of Levuka village

On May 11 Wilkes decided to build an observatory of tents, houses, and a small research garden. It was situated 30 feet above the beach on a peak near Levuku village, and above Vi Tonga village as a forward operating center for the Fiji Expedition. The observatory was erected on May 11, with guards surrounding the perimeter.

On May 12, Chief Tanoa arrived in a finely decorated 100 foot, double hulled, outrigger canoe with a sail and a 40-man crew. It landed at Levuka's harbor. He boarded the Vincennes and through Whippey was able to negotiate a trade deal between Bau and the United States. A few days later, Wilkes received Seru Epenisa Cakobau the son and crown prince of Tanoa, who further cemented bonds of the Bau nation and the expedition. Seru would one day come to unite the Kingdoms of Bau, Rewa, and Naitasiri into the short lived Kingdom of Fiji.

While Tanoa was the King of Bau, he exercised the greatest influence among all the other kingdoms of the islands of Fiji, Tui Levuku was in charge of Ovalau Island. With the aid of Whippey, Tui Levuku helped the Americans maintain their supply lines, trade with Levuku village, and receive information through the first six weeks of the Fiji expedition.

== Capture of Chief Veidovi ==
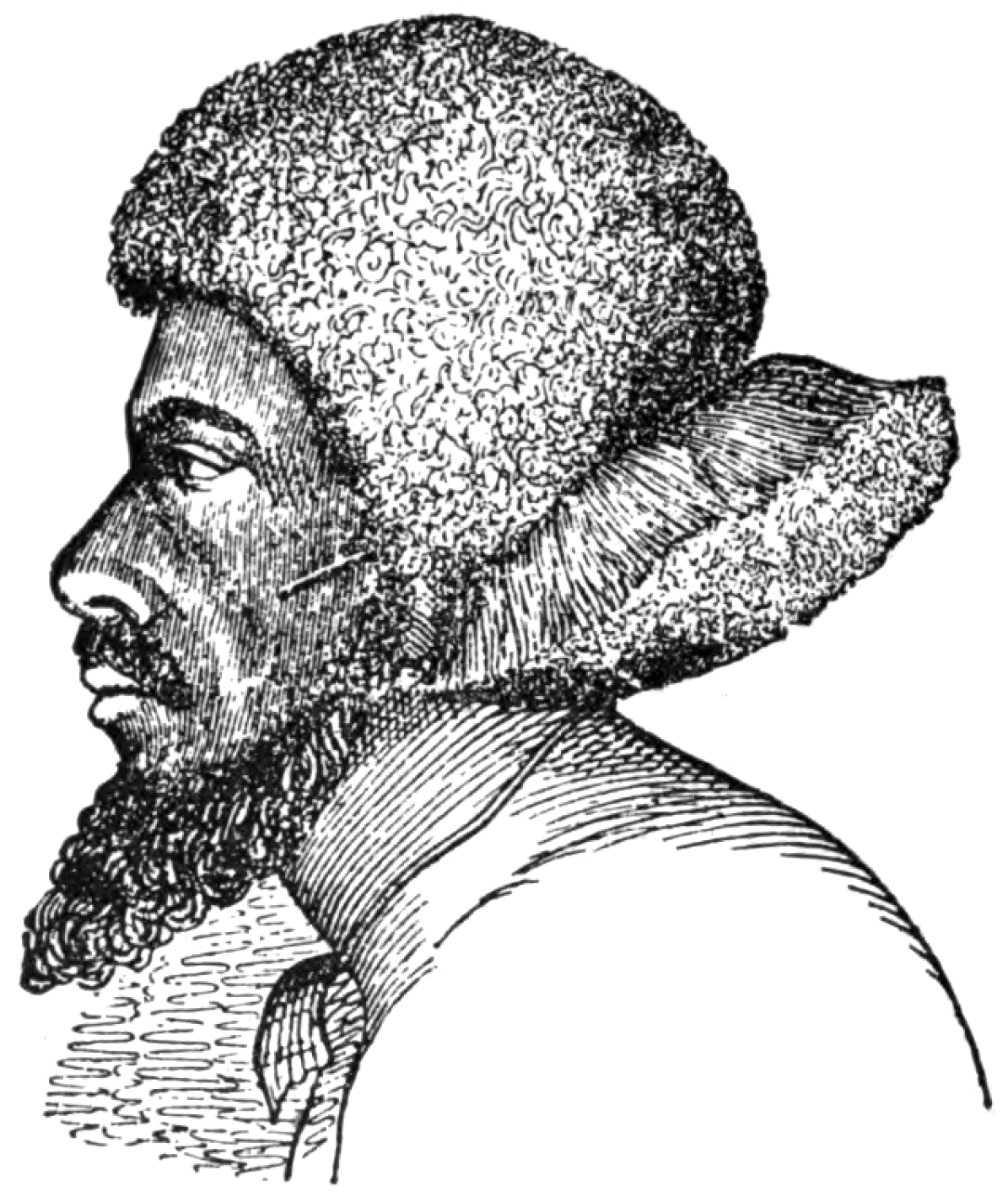
Chief Veidovi before he was shaved. (Image by Alfred Thomas Agate)

After a few says an Irish beachcomber named Paddy O'Connell entered Wilkes, tent on Ovalu. O'Connell attempted to hire himself out to Wilkes, but Wilkes dismissed him at first. However, a single story caught his interest. O'Connell informed Wiles that he was a witness to the murder of several of the crew of the American bêche-de-mer merchant ship the Charles Doggett in August 1834, on Ono Island. Wilkes learned that a Fijian chief named Veidovi was the man who organized the attack. According to O'Connell he was a crewman of the Charles Doggett when the incident occurred. In this instance Captain Bachelor of the Charles Doggett made a contract with a chief named Veidovi for bêche-de-mer on Rewa. (Note: The Americans called him Vendovi and he is often referred to as such.) When the Charles Doggett reached Rewa, it was agreed that a minor chief would willingly be taken hostage for the protection of the Westerners while they set up a bêche-de-mer house on shore. Later the chief feigned sickness and was allowed to return to shore. The next day the minor chief returned with Veidovi and some of his men and asked for medicine at the bêche-de-mer house. The mate, eight other men, and a boy came ashore, all except one were killed, robbed, and the house was house set on fire. One survivor swam back to the ship. The next day the captain, through O'Connell, was able to negotiate for all the bodies back except an African American crewmate whose body was eaten. Later O'Connell became a beachcomber and discovered that while Veidovi was the primary perpetrator of this attack, the other chiefs of Rewa and especially Veidovi's kin endorsed the killings. Upon hearing this story Wilkes became angry and sent O'Connell to Lieutenant Hudson on the Peacock to arrest Veidovi.

O'Connell met Hudson and gave him Wilkes' orders. The pair of them set out for Rewa in Viti Levu where Veidovi lived. It was there that Hudson eventually met with King Kania or Roko Tui Dreketi/King of Rewa and Methodist missionaries of the English Wesleyan Mission who helped him get the lay of the land. (Note: Tui Dreketi may be attentively spelled "Tui Ndraketi".) After assessing the political landscape, Hudson quickly concocted a plan to trap Veidovi. On May 21 Hudson invited the King Kania and his three brothers on board the Peacock to a welcoming reception. Between 70 and over 100 local Fijians showed up along with the Tui Dreketi himself, but Veidovi was noticeably absent. Hudson lured the native royals into his cabin with an offering of a meal and then called for battle stations. The royals were split away from their retainers. Hudson promised mercy to the chiefs in exchange for them delivering Veidovi to them, and causing no harm to the local missionaries. After a spout of protest the King Kania agreed, and two of the chiefs brothers were released to arrest Veidovi dead or alive.

The following day Veidovi arrived and agreed to go quietly in exchange for the freedom of his family and their families respectively. Hudson took Veidovi to his personal cabin for interrogation and Veidovi openly conceded to orchestrating the Charles Doggett killings. Veidovi explained that he lured the mate of the ship into a trip and feigned a friendly greeting to the mate of the ship. Then his men seized the mate and clubbed him to death, and then proceeded to kill more of the ship hands. Veidovi added that his motivations were to acquire firearms and that he was only following his culture in that "...he had only followed the Fegee customs and done what his people had often done before.". Hudson decided to punish Veidovi by forcing him to travel with the Ex. Ex. and then live in America for a few years, where he would learn to be civilized and not kill white people. Veidovi was dismayed, since as a chief he had 55 wives and numerous children that he would have to leave behind.

Hudson then headed for Kadavu Island where it was said more of the perpetrators of the attack on the Charles Doggett resided. However, the wind was against him, and suffering for a lack of time in his other duties for the expedition, Hudson satisfied himself with the capture of Veidovi and returned to Levuka.

Word traveled fast of Veidovi's capture, it spread to the village of Levuka, and then to Wilkes himself. Whippey and Tui Levuku soon caught wind of a plot to capture Wilkes in order to entice and exchange of prisoners (Wilkes for Veidovi). The suspected perpatrtors would have been King Tanoa who was allies with King Kania. In the Mountains of Ovalau resided the Livoni tribe who were allied with Tanoa. Wilkes remained armed, furnished himself an escort, he ordered 40 men to reinforce the observatory. Wilkes then took Seru hostage on board the Vincennes, repositioned the guns of the Vincennes to a more defensible position. Wilkes also brought his dog Sydney with him (which terrified the natives), and an attempted kidnapping never materialized.

== Arrival of Captain Edward Belcher ==
In early June, a British expedition consisting of the HMS Sulphur (1826) HMS Starling (1829)) commanded by Captain Edward Belcher arrived in Fiji. Belcher was conducting his own separate surveying expedition and had just come from the Vavaʻu island group in Tonga. Belcher traveled to Rewa where the Sulphur had lost a rudder from hitting a reef. After Belcher's expedition encountered other members of the Ex. Ex. and through messengers, Wilkes gave Belcher a spare rudder from the fleet. Later, Wilkes came to meet Belcher aboard his ship, and they spoke together in Belcher's cabin. However, despite Wilkes' goodwill in offering Belcher an extra rudder, Belcher was less than pleased to see him. Belcher was required to pay port charges due to the trade deal that he had set up between the U.S. and chief Tanoa. The meeting did not accomplish much, although Wilkes found out that Belcher had explored the Columbia River the year before in 1839, and based on Belcher's descriptions Wilkes believed he would definitely need to extend the length of the Ex. Ex. by at least a year. The two parted cordially and Belcher and his ships later sailed to Vanuatu.

== Club dance festival ==
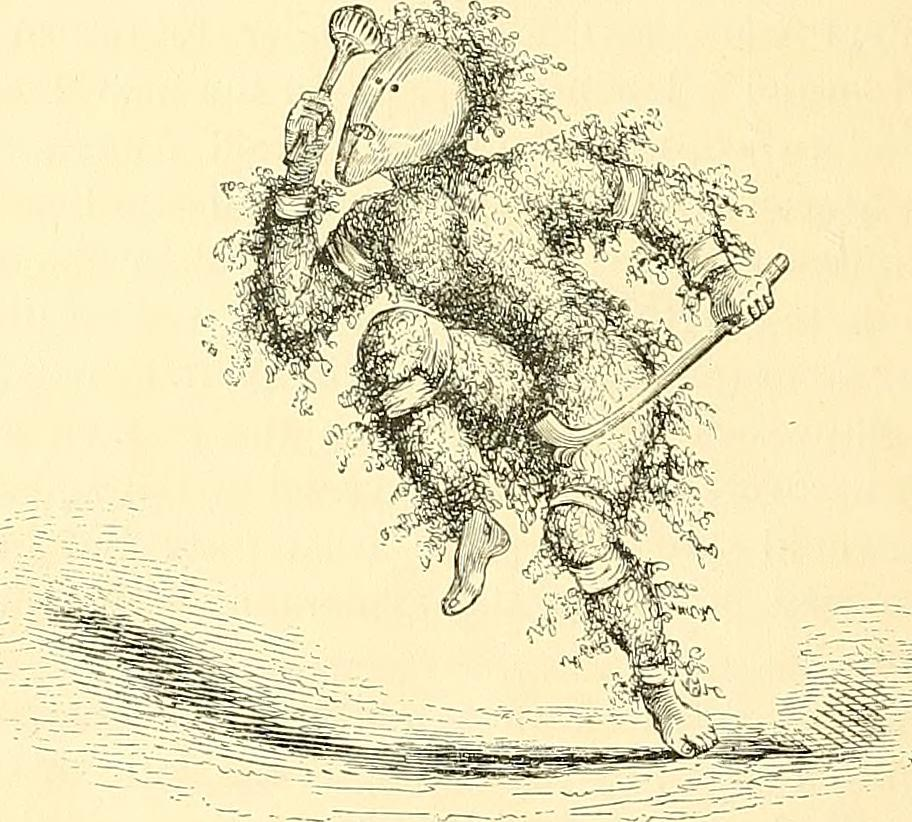
A "Feejee" clown dancing as the opening act of a Meke I Wau Club Dance that took place in Fiji on Ovalau Island in Levuka village on June 24th 1840 during the United States Exploring Expedition.

Chief Tui Levuku decided to honor the Ex. Ex. with a traditional Club dance/Meke called the Meke I Wau or Meke Mada on June 24 at Levuku village. Over a hundred Fijians and their chiefs from Levuku and other nearby villages attended. The Americans were directed to the Mbure/temple, or spirit-house, which had an elevated platform where they could more easily observe the festivities. The location overlooked the village from where they observed a low square stone wall on the opposite end of the street. On one end many Fijians sat down awaiting the performance and on the opposite were several Fijian musicians. Eventually a "Feejee Clown" emerged in the center of the crowd, and began to galivant and dance wildly, to the delight and laughter of all. The clown's body was completely enveloped with green and brown leaves and several vines, except for his face to which he wore a mask. Wilkes stated that to him the mask looked somewhat like the face of a bear. The mask was painted black on one half and orange on the other. The clown danced with one large club in one hand and a shorter one on the other. While the clown performed, the musicians began to play with hand claps, sticks, and bamboo joints which made a soft drumming sound.

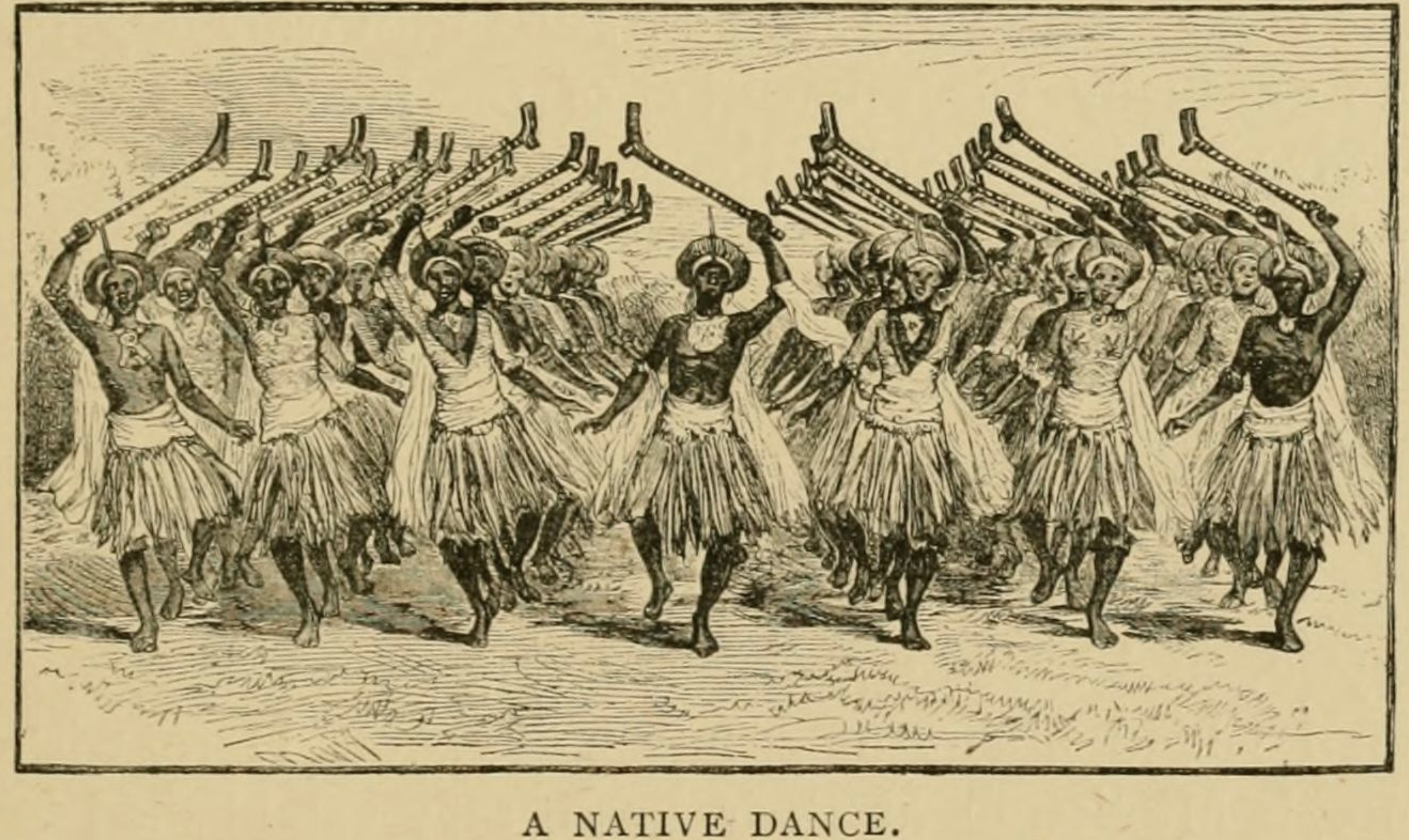
A Meke I Wau Club Dance as depicted in the 1890 book James Calvert : or, From dark to dawn in Fiji. Where a club dance is depicted.

Roughly 100 club dancers were waiting behind a rock until they were ready. Then they emerged in a column of two and began to proceed down the street at a slow three step pace. They all wore the white I-sala turban typically worn by priests and chiefs as well as a white Masi tapa cloth to cover themselves. Their sala were decorated with flowers and vines, and their faces were painted in various patterns of black and vermillion. As the dance columns advanced they split up from two columns to three and then to four and danced and swung their clubs in a variety of motions and poses. They danced into the square and joined the clown and the musicians. The dancers began singing with the musicians and their dances became more rapid and volatile, before they concluded their song and dance with a loud cry of "Wha---hoo".

When the presentation had concluded the dancers laid their clubs down in a pile before the Americans as a gift to them, but they expected to receive gifts in return. The next day Wilkes gave gifts on behalf of the expedition to Chief Tui Levuku so that he might distribute them.

== Departure from Levuka and the founding of a mission school ==
Soon after the end of the club dance festival, Wilkes decided to pack up the observatory and move on to other areas of the Fijian Islands. Before the expeditions departure the purser Robert Waldron purchased and donated land for the construction of a Methodist mission school, with both a school house and chapel led by John Hunt. Following this, the Vincennes departed on the 28th of June, to survey the hot springs of Savusavu on the Island of Vanua Levu. (Note: Some of the materials left over from the dismantling of the observatory may also have gone to help construct the mission-school.)

== Accidents involving the Peacock ==
The Peacock had several accidents associated with or on it during this expedition. At Vita Levu the ship sustained considerable, but non fatal damages to its hull. While one of the Peacocks cutter boats had overturned and sank. At one point one man lost three fingers to an anchor chain. On another occasion a man accidentally shot off his index finger. A third sailor nearly had his leg entirely detached. Later, another sailor had an accident while winding the capstan and broke his ribs. However, perhaps the worst accident occurred on June 29 when 2nd mate Joseph Baxter of the bêche-de-mer Leonidas unwittingly placed a gunpowder cartridge under his shirt while preparing to fire a cannon (for non offensive purposes). A spark flew off from the igniter and hit the cartridge the man was carrying which exploded over three pounds of gunpowder, and the man was badly charred from the ordeal. Baxter was later transferred to the Peacock for medical attention. He confessed that he was a French man whose real name was Vincent Boudet. He died on August 9 on Mbua bay.

== Discoveries, acquisitions, and accomplishments made during the expedition ==
=== Acquisition of a cannibalized skull ===
During one occasion of the expedition the Peacock was off the coast of Tavea when a chief and his wife and an escort of three canoes approached the ship. Hoping to antagonize the crew, the natives explained that they had captured three prisoners from an enemy village and had "roasted them and eaten part!". They displayed a piece of one of the bodies that had been preserved in plantain leaves to show the crew. Then they produced a half gnawed on skull to be exhibited. The crew also noticed one native eating an eyeball, with flesh dangling from his mouth. Some of the men vomited at this spectacle. Later the Waldron bought the skull to be added to the Ex. Ex.'s artifact collection in exchange for some cloth.

=== Discoveries of the science team ===
William Brackenridge the horticulturalist and Charles Pickering the naturalist teamed up to make several discoveries together while at Fiji. With their mutual cooperation, they discovered over 650 different plant species. This included a new species of tomato and poison ivy. Moreover, Pickering made the discovery that if the science team did not bring anything that appeared valuable to the natives, they could travel about the Islands without great fear of danger or harassment. This gave them ample time an opportunity to conduct their research. And Brackenridge, for his part, found the last existing variant of sandalwood on Fiji, which up until that point was thought to have been extinct from over harvesting.

Horatio Hale, the teams' philologist and anthropologist, documented over 5,600 words in the Fiji language and documented their craftsmanship in producing various canoes, dwellings, and pottery.

Formation of an atoll

James Dwight Dana the team's geologist made a titanic discovery in his field. He proved Charles Darwin's theory of subsidence, which Darwin had spoken about publicly, but was formally addressed in his book The Structure and Distribution of Coral Reefs. In the theory of subsidence after a volcanic Island is formed and after a lengthy period of time a fringing reef forms along the edges or "fringes" of the Island. After that and given more time the Island begins to erode and sink and a lagoon begins to form around the island and the fringing reef becomes a barrier reef. Then after further erosion and sinking over time the island sinks into the sea and only the reef and lagoon it forms remains becoming an atoll. Darwin at first thought he could not adequately prove his theory, but Dana proved it by finding all 3 stages of reef formations on the islands of Cicia, Matuku, and Nanuku.

Doctor John L. Fox one of the Ex. Ex.'s surgeons was able to study a number of local diseases endemic to Fiji on Ovalau, as well as the natives methods for treating them. One of these diseases included a disease the Fijians of the time called "dthoke" which has similarities to both lupus and yaws, and may be mistaken for secondary stage syphilis. Another was a Fijian form of influenza called the "dandy cough" that the natives believe spread and mutated through contact with contact from white people, or as the Fijian's called them "Papalangi". Fox believed this influenza may have come from an influenza epidemic that had spread in the USA a few years before the Ex. Ex. had arrived in Fiji. Fox recorded reports from many local whites that about a tenth of the Fijian population had died during that time.

== Burning of Solevu and Tye ==
Burning of Solevu and Tye
Date	July 12, 1840
Location	20 miles southeast of Bua, Vanua Levu, Fiji
Result	Villages of Solevu and Tye burned

Belligerents
United States	Fijians

Commanders and leaders
Charles Wilkes	Unknown Fijian Chief

Strength
Land: 80 men Sea: 11 boats and 1 U.S. Schooner	Land: 150–200 men

Casualties and losses
None	None

See: Burning of Solevu and Tye

On July 11th, the Vincenees, Flying Fish, and Peacock were surveying in Bua Bay, Bua, Vanua Levu. Wilkes dispatched, Lieutenant Oliver Hazard Perry Jr. (of the Perry Family) and passed midshipman Samuel R. Knox 20 miles southeast, to lead a two cutter survey to chart Solevu bay. (Note: This Solevu bay and village in Vanua Levu 20 miles to the Southeast of Bua, should not be confused with the more modern Solevu village on Malolo Island located to the South of modern day Yaro/Arro.) The pair and their crews had been stuck in the bay by a storm for numerous days, with dwindling supplies. While the boats were anchored a group of natives taunted them threateningly from the beach. Eventually their food ran out and both Perry and Knox felt compelled to escape. Knox made a lone attempt with his crew. The winds blew hard as the crew made for the shore. Upon disembarking the boat, the sailors were encircled by several natives with clubs, spears, and a small amount of firearms. The crews gunpowder was wet and so if it came down to a fight the crew would need to resort to hand-to-hand combat. However, in an unprecedented move by Western accounts the chief in charge of the natives took pity on the explorers. Knox and his men swam back to Perry's boat, which became overloaded.

As night fell, the natives lit fires on the beach and occasionally took pot shots at Perry and his men. In the cover of night, the natives stealthily began diving and swimming to the boat, and attempted to either lift the anchor or cut the anchor chain to drag the boat ashore. The sailors began firing into the water, and eventually were able to capture two of the tribesmen who swam to the boat and made an effort to appear to be allies. Perry suspected them as spies and so arrested them. It turned out they were both chiefs one of high rank and one of low rank. Upon taking these men hostage, the natives on the shore made no more attempts to go after the boat that night. It was supposed that they feared the death of their chiefs. When morning came Perry made a second attempt to escape the bay. This time he attempted to maneuver his cutter around the shallow reefs and into the open ocean. The Natives, realizing what Perry was attempting to accomplish, assembled around the edges of the reef. At one point the boat struck a reef and took on water. The men attempted to bail and keep their distance from the natives.

Perry was able to escape with his crew and prisoners. On July 12, Perry met with the Vincennes, Flying Fish, and Peacock which had all rendezvoused at Bua Bay. After learning what had happened, Wilkes assembled 11 boats, 80 men, and the Flying Fish to exact retribution, and retrieve the stolen cutter.

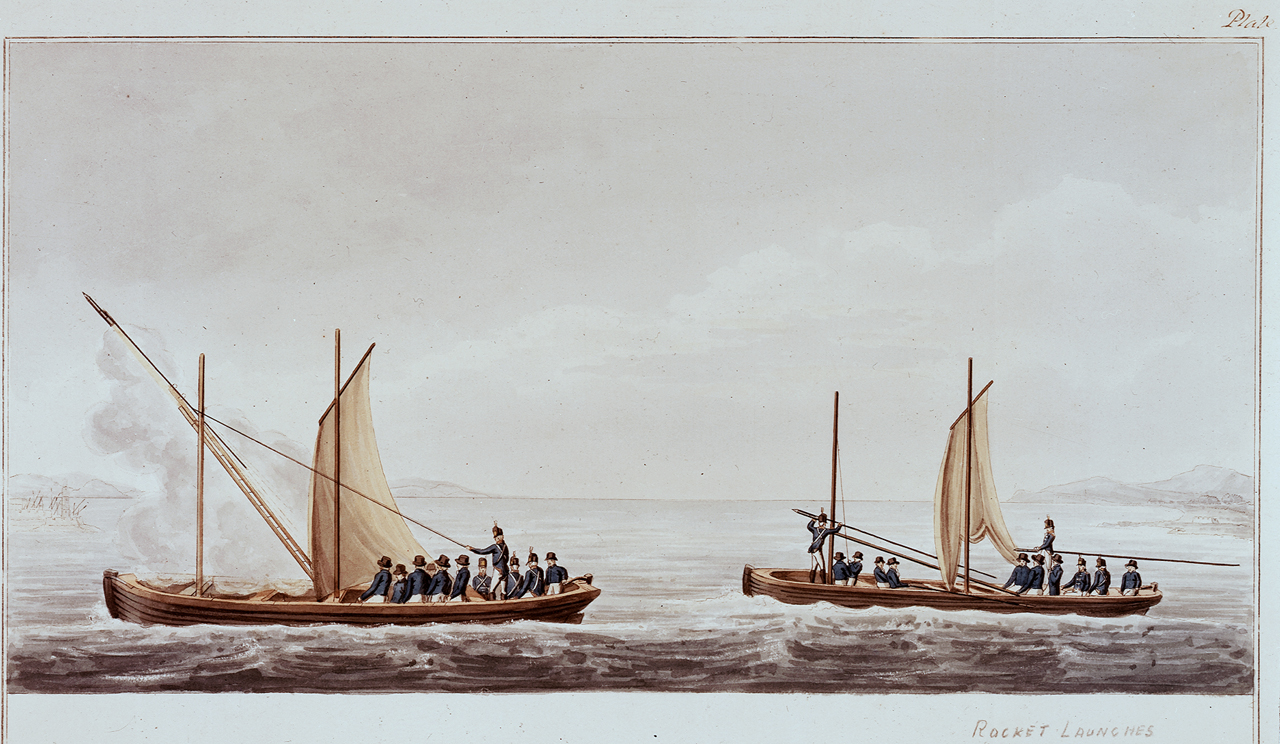
"Use of rockets from boats" – An illustration from Sir William Congreve's book. (In both the Burning of Solevu and Tye and the Battle of Malolo the U.S. Navy implemented Congreve rockets in order to burn down enemy villages. The Fijians called them "Curlew" [Meaning Spirits] or "Flying Devils")

The flotilla arrived in the afternoon at low tide. As the waters were shallow a mudflat had formed between Wilkes' ships and the stolen cutter. Wilkes met with the chiefs representatives and used Whippey as a translator. Wilkes commanded the natives to return the boat and all items that were in it. The natives were intimidated as up until this point in Fijian history there was never before a time when so many westerners had gathered threatening war. The chief returned the boat, but did not return the boats equipment and belongings of the crew.

Outraged Wilkes landed most of his men armed with muskets, but remained on a gig from which he would direct a Congreve rocket. Wilkes ordered the burning of Solevu village and the politically linked nearby village of Tye. Combined the fighters of these villages were between 150 and 200 warriors. However, both the warriors and the populace fled into the hills and Wilkes fired rockets into the village. The villages were destroyed, but due to the simplicity of the villages' material, the structures would be repaired in a few weeks. Aside from loss or damage to property no side suffered any casualties.

Following the burning of the villages, and in an act of good will, Wilkes released the two captured chiefs and bestowed them with valuable gifts. His logic was that they came bearing friendship and aid to Perry's crew. This was also done to demonstrate to the natives that hostility to Americans (and white people in general) would be met with vengeance, and cordiality met with reward.

== Battle of Malolo ==
See: Battle of Malolo

=== Background ===
Battle of Malolo
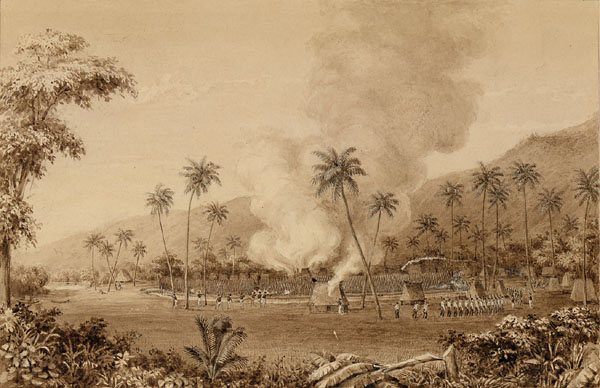
Date	July 24–25, 1840
Location	Sualib and Arro villages, Malolo Island, Mamanuca Islands, Fiji
Result	United States victory: Deaths of U.S. sailors avenged; Enemy chief killed; Sualib and Arro villages destroyed; Survivors of Solevu and Arro surrender; Reparations received by the expedition

Belligerents
United States	Fijians

Commanders and leaders
Charles Wilkes	† Unknown Fijian Chief

Strength
Land: 70 men at least 1 Fijian scout Sea: Several boats, 1 U.S. schooner, and 1 U.S. brig	Land: Unknown (Over 100) (Note: It is unclear whether or not women were counted as combatants for numbering purposes, although a number of them did fight during the engagement at Sualib.) Sea: Unknown number of canoes

Casualties and losses
Military: 2 Dead Several Injured	Military: 74-104 dead (Note: There are at least three known estimates for the casualties at Sualib. These are 57, 80, and 87. Again it is unclear if women were counted as combatants, and of those who were killed which ones were fighting with their men and which ones were trying to avoid danger. Moreover most of the bodies were burned when the village caught fire and the Americans evacuated to safety, which makes the casualty count more difficult to estimate. Combining the casualties at Sualib together with the engagement on the 24th, the boat battles, and the bayonetting of the man in between Solevu and Arro, there were at least 17 deaths. For the final engagement which was a boat battle the witnesses state that several were killed, but did not give an estimate. So if you add the 57 to 17 you get 74, if you add 80 to 17 we have 97, and if you add 87 to 17 you get 104.) Unknown injured Civilian: At least one child (Note: According to one report, Henry Eld ordered his men to avoid shooting near the child and attempted to grab her and pull her to safety. However, the heat from the fire was too intense for Eld and he retreated. Later, it was found that the child had died as a result of collateral damage due to either fire or smoke inhalation. There may have other civilian casualties during the battle, but the sources have not specified any specifically.) Unknown injured

Part of the Ex. Ex. soon moved on from Solevu to the Mamanuca Islands to continue their survey mission, while the Vincennes and Peacock deployed to Muthuata Island. Whippey informed Wilkes that this set of islands was particularly notorious for being perilous to westerners, as the residents of Malolo were noted for being pirates and the worst offenders of attacking foreigners. Wilkes acknowledged the danger and made sure his boats were grouped together and well escorted. He deployed three boats and the Porpoise and Flying Fish for this mission. The boats were led by Lieutenants Alden, Emmons, and Joseph Underwood.

On July 22 the squadron reached Drawaqa Island at the southern most end of the Yasawa Islands. (Note: Wilkes named this Eld Island for the survey, but today it is called Drawaqa Island.) Wilkes divided his squadron. He sent two boats led by Alden and Underwood to the middle of the Mamanucas, the Porpoise took the Western side, and the Flying Fish and Emmons' cutter took the Western end. The goal was for all three groups to complete their surveying that day and then assemble together at Malolo Island the next day.

On July 24, Alden and Underwood finished their surveying without issue, and anchored on the east side of Malolo next to Malolo Lailai for the night. In the morning Underwood and Alden noticed the Flying Fish and Emmons boat anchored in the distant East along Malolo. An hour later, Emmons boat approached Underwood and Alden's. They inquired for food, but Emmons regrettably told them that the Flying Fish was entirely bereft of anymore supplies. This distressed the officers as only a few days ago Wilkes had cut the food rations by a third due to low provision levels, and currently Underwood and Alden's men only had a few yams with them. It was decided to try and trade with the local natives for food.

Underwood encountered a Fijian boy chief in the area, who was carrying war clubs which struck him as menacing, and so arrested him. Later, he found a group of local natives and through a Māori interpreter named John Sac, Underwood negotiated for food. Underwood was able to negotiate a tentative deal between himself and the natives. The village of Malolo was on the Southwest part of the island and the natives proposed making an exchange for a few hogs. However, in order to get them Underwood would have to accompany the natives and one of the boats would have to sail to the Southwestern part of the island to pick them up. It turned out that the local chief's son was the man that Underwood had captured. In light of this, Underwood agreed to travel with the natives to their village provided that the chiefs son stay with his boat as a captive and guarantee of Underwood's safety, and would be released when business was concluded. (Note: The practice of taking a hostage when negotiating with Fijians is implied by Wilkes to have been common between Westerners and Fijians at the time.)

Underwood used his own boat (the Leopard) as it was smaller than Alden and Emmons cutters and could more easily go over the shallows without getting trapped. He left all but three of his muskets with the Porpoise in order to further reduce weight and increase the ease of travel. This was actually against the standing orders that Wilkes had laid out for safety, but Underwood did not believe that the Fijians were as dangerous as was commonly supposed. Underwood brought Sac with him to translate, along with six other men. The rest of the men stayed with the Leopard (commanded by Alden) and their hostage on the beach.

Underwood met a group of natives near the village by a tree. The tree had many throwing and maiming clubs tied to the branches, and two thin hogs next to it. Underwood tried to barter for the swine, but he was informed that no transaction could be made without the chiefs approval. After half an hour the chief appeared after returning from a fishing trip. The Chief demanded a musket with ammo and powder in exchange for the hogs.

Meanwhile, Alden and his men had waited in their boat a short distance from the shore, however their men were becoming agitated. The tide was coming in and Alden didn't trust the natives as much as Underwood did. A messenger soon came from Underwood giving him an update of the situation. Alden sent a message to Underwood to stop negotiating and return to the ship. He sent Wilkes' Nephew Midshipman Wilkes Henry (who was named after his Uncle), to deliver the message. Soon after, a Canoe came up alongside the Leopard and began talking to the chief's son. The Fijian attempted to get out of the boat, but Aden pulled him down. Another half an hour passed, and negotiations seemed to be progressing. Another messenger from Underwood informed Alden that the chief wanted a hatchet and then the hogs would go to the sailors. Alden gave the man the hatchet and he ran to give it to Underwood.

Not long after Emmons arrived in one of the cutters. He and his crew had been looking for an area to eat the pigs at the nearby Malolo Lailai island, and began discussing it with Alden. Alden was sharing with Emmons his anxieties over the negotiations and the chief's son's attempted escape, when the native leaped out of the boat and made for the opposite direction from the village. Alden ordered one of his men to shoot over the chief's head to entice him to return.

=== The Killing of Lieutenant Underwood and Midshipman Wilkes Henry ===
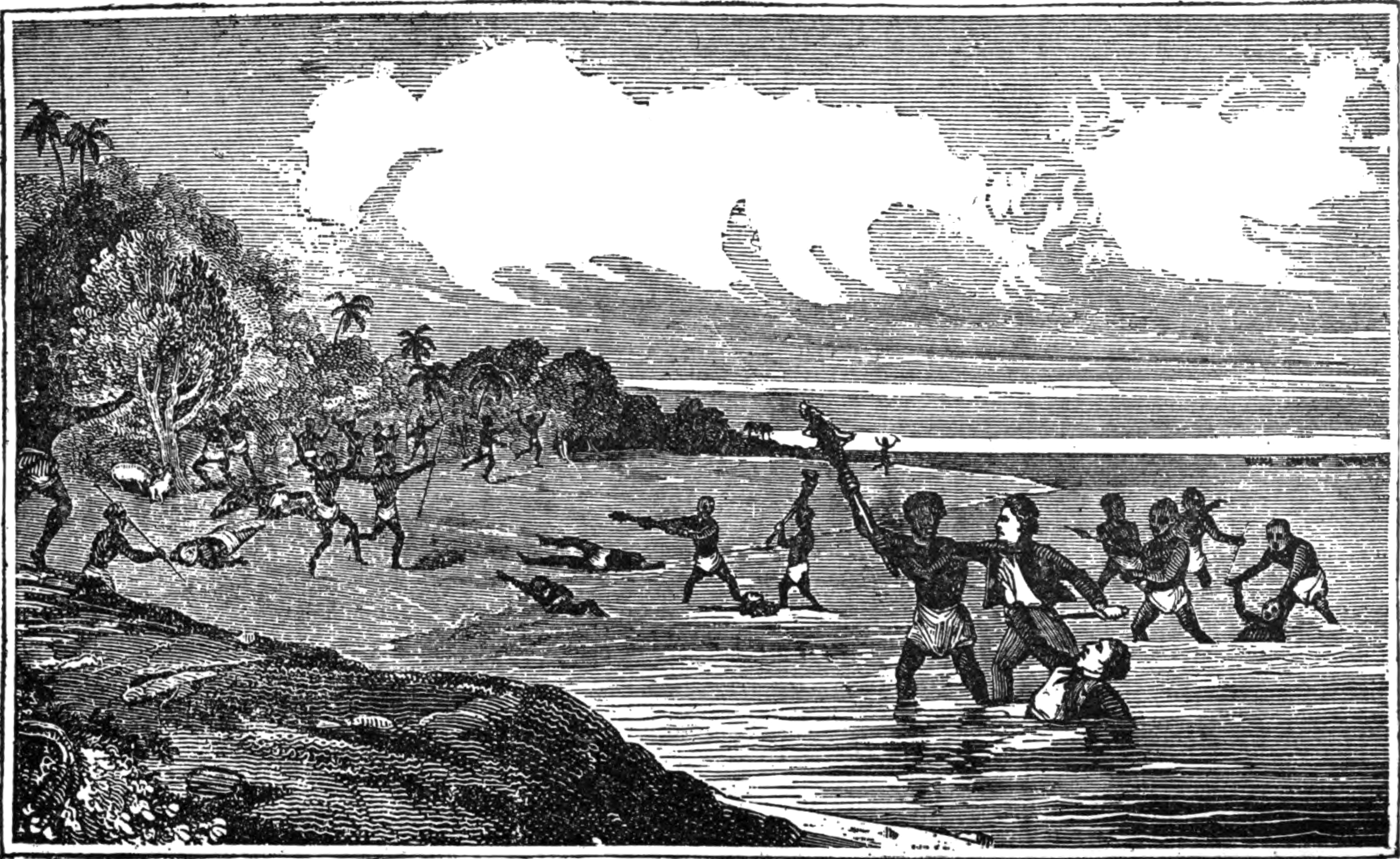
KILLING OF LIEUTENANT UNDERWOOD AND MIDSHIPMAN WILKES HENRY (An illustration from the book Twenty years before the mast by Charles Erskine in 1896) (Note: Charles Erskine served on the EX. EX.)

Accounts differ as to what happened next, however when the shot went off. Alden and Emmons claimed that the chief's son's escape attempt was a signal for the natives to attack. While those who were negotiating with the chief claimed that the attack began after the shot was fired. Either way, the chief shouted that he thought that the sailors on the beach had killed his son, and ordered an assault. Two Fijians grabbed the musket of one of Underwood's men, named Joseph Clark. Clark gripped the musket and then brandished a knife. He stabbed one native and then bashed another with the muskets' shoulder stock. Then, several natives began spilling out of the mangrove bushes. Underwood's men began to fire their muskets as they retreated to the two boats.

About 100 natives began to give chase to the men retreating on the beach and threw spears and throwing clubs at their enemy. Wilkes Henry and Underwood covered the retreat. Henry was hit by a club and then shot the man who threw it at him. Then another native hit him in the back of the head. Henry collapsed to the ground with his face in the water, was surrounded by natives, and then stripped. Joseph Clark was hit by a glancing blow in the mouth and the spear landed in Underwood's left arm. Clark shot the man who threw the spear in the head and then another native knocked Clark out with a club. He fell into the water, but the pain from the salt water on his bloody face soon woke him. Clark stood up and witnessed Underwood being clubbed in the back of the head. Clark attempted to drag Underwood to safety with one arm, and hit away other natives with his other. Then Clark was hit twice more and fell down. He got back up when he noticed another native was about to club the unconscious Underwood and stabbed him repeatedly. Clark grabbed Underwood again who briefly came to and told him to tell his wife he loved her. Then Underwood had his head clubbed in and died. Clark was left in a state of shock and delirium. He got up and limped to the rest of the escaping sailors. Clark's face was covered in blood and dangling flesh and in his absent minded state, he laughed and sang at the natives. The natives were perplexed by Clark's actions and stayed clear of him for the rest of the engagement. Besides Clark, all the men who retreated back to the beach that survived suffered injuries.

When Aldan and Emmons saw the fighting on the beach their crews began to row for the shore. Once the other retreating men had assembled at the boats with Alden and Emmons, Alden a handful of men went back to look for Underwood and Henry. They encountered Clark in his delusional state and sent him back to the boats. The natives had retreated back to their village. Then Alden and his men found the bodies of both of Underwood and Henry almost completely naked. Underwood's face was smashed beyond recognition. As for Henry, aside from the bruising and his nudity, Henry looked unharmed, but his mourners soon realized that Henry had drowned while unconscious.

On the beach, there lay the bodies of ten Fijians from the attack. One of them stirred and was still alive, and in a fit of fury and vengeance the men, shot and stabbed him several times, before cutting off his head. A number of the men, wanted to pursue the natives back to their village. But there were less than two dozen men, and the natives could return at any moment and overwhelm them. Alden commanded the men make a swift retreat back to the rest of the expedition. The bodies of Henry and Underwood were gingerly placed in the cutter and covered in jackets to uphold their dignity, and the two boats sailed back to the Flying Fish.

Once the bodies were brought on board they were placed in the ships port side and covered with a tarp. Wilkes wept bitterly for his nephew. He knelt and kissed him. He called Underwood a "poor fellow". The cadavers were stitched into hammocks, draped in flags, buried on a nearby small island, and hidden out of fear that the natives would dig up and cannibalize the bodies. Wilkes named the Island Henry Island after his Nephew (not to be confused with Henry Island (Washington), which he also named after his Nephew later in the expedition).

=== Prelude to the main battle ===
That night (July 24) Wilkes set up boat patrols commanded by Alden, Emmons, and Eld around Malolo to ensure no native escaped. It became evident that the natives also expected a counterattack. Fijians in full war paint and equipped with muskets were scattered around the shoreline and would fire pot shots at the boat crews. The crews would occasionally fire back, but the natives would take cover and drop prone before a musket ball could hit them.

In the morning of July 25. Wilkes sent a force of about 70 men and a Fijian scout in 3 divisions. The force was commanded by Lieutenant Ringgold, they landed in Southern Malolo. Wilkes gave orders to kill all men and burn the village, but "spare only the women and the children.". From there the men began marching to the fortified village of Sualib just outside of where Underwood and Henry were killed. The Flying Fish and Porpoise waited on the coast with their cannons fixed on the shore. The Flying Fish was originally going to lead the boats into battle, but it grounded on a sandbar.

In the meantime Wilkes organized a small fleet of boats commanded by Alden, Emmons, and Clark whose mission was to search and destroy all hostile escaping canoes. There other objective was to approach the smaller Arro (sometimes called Yaro) village and neutralize it while Ringgold's force would destroy Sualib and link up with Wilkes flotilla in Arro.

=== Beginning of the main battle ===
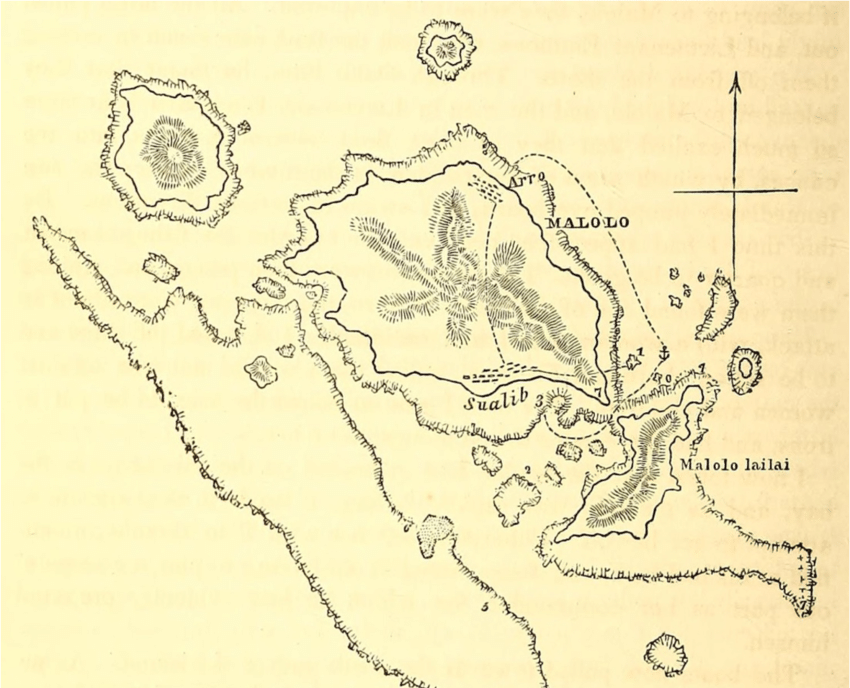
Map of the Malolo Island Group depicting the Battle of Malolo. The numbers correspond to: 1. Place of landing. 2. Boats' Anchorage. 3. Position of boats off Sualib 4. Point where the two canoes were captured 5. Where Lieutenant Emmons met the canoes. 6. Sand Bar. 7. Hill on which the natives sued for mercy. (The ------- line is the track of the boats and shore party.) Notice Malolo Lailai is to the South East of Malolo

As the landing party was disembarking, three canoes appeared and were headed to Malolo Lailai. Emmons and Alden took two boats and pursued them. Once they were close enough an interpreter asked the natives where they were from. A native responded that they were from Malolo. Emmons fired the forward mounted blunderbuss and killed six natives. The rest of the natives jumped in the water. Alden ordered that the rest be taken as prisoners, but his men had bloodlust and shouted "Kill" repeatedly. One man grabbed a Fijian woman by the hair and was about to slash her with his sword when Alden aimed his pistol at him. Alden was able to reign in his men and together with Emmons, and they captured several men, women, and children, including a chief from Arro village. The men were handcuffed and kept captive, but the women and children were released on the beach.

=== The destruction of Arro village ===
While Emmons and Alden were occupied capturing the natives during their engagement, Wilkes proceeded with his boats to Arro. He found the village deserted, and put it to the flame. The men had gone ahead to join the defense of Sualib and the women and children had fled to the mountains. Wilkes continued on and hoped to reinforce Ringgold at Sualib, but found it destroyed. He doubled back and later met Ringgold at Arro.

=== The engagement at Sualib village ===
The ground force landed at 10 A.M. and divided up in to three groups as Wilkes had ordered. The groups were led by Lieutenants Ringgold, Robert Johnson and Andrew Murray, and included passed midshipman Henry Eld and Alfred Thomas Agate of the science corps. Ringgold gave a short speech and reminded the men to destroy everything except the women and children. The forces split up into different paths and destroyed farms along the way, before meeting up and surrounded the fort. The fort itself was circular, with a 12 foot wide by 6 feet deep ditch/dry moat which they used as a trench, and a ten foot tall coconut tree and whicker palisade on all sides. (Note: According to George Musalas Colvocoresses this moat was filled with water.) The natives had occupied the trench and the palisade edges, and together they either aimed their muskets outside of the trench through small holes in the palisade walls. A number of chiefs, recognizable by their white headdresses, commanded the warriors in between the trenches and stockade. The warriors began to shout obscenities at the oncoming attackers.

The Americans fired a Congreve rocket and their muskets at the fort, and the Fijians quickly dashed into the fort. The enemy retreated, a portion of Johnson's division, without orders stormed the fort. The attack was spearheaded by Sinclair with a double barrel shotgun. When Sinclair entered the fort he quickly realized that it was a trap. The ditch which had been built outside of the palisades also extended into the interior and was occupied by a large number of natives. This included women armed with bows who fought with their men. Retreat for Sinclair and his advance was impractical and decidedly more dangerous than it was worth. The fort was purposefully built like a fish weir trap, with a wide opening, but a narrow avenue of escape. Sinclair got shot with an arrow in his lapel, but it only penetrated the fabric of his coat and not the skin.

Sinclair's fortune did not stop at his lapel. The Americans began running up to the palisade and shooting into the village through the small holes the Fijians had previously been using. Musket fire and Congreve rockets poured into Sualib. Americans began trickling into the village, in twos, by a narrow bridge, through the gate, and into the fort following Sinclair's example. At one point Sinclair shot a chief with his pistol, which turned out to be the chief of Sualib. Several natives carried the chiefs limp body to a nearby hut.

The battle crept on in a state of havoc for about 15–30 minutes before a Congreve rocket hit the top of a dry roof and caught fire. A native warrior got on to of the roof in an effort to remove the rocket before the fire spread, but he was shot down in a hail of bullets. The fire proliferated and began to engulf the village. The blaze forced the natives to flee the ditch and into American musket fire, which cut them down. The resulting spectacle was pure pandemonium. A translator attempted to shout that the women and children would be allowed to escape. Fire and gun smoke were everywhere, children were weeping, pigs were crying, the fire roared, the noise was ear splitting. The Americans cheered their success and then fell back to a coconut grove, as the village burned.

After a half an hour to an hour, the fires had settled to an approachable state, the Americans reentered the village. They soon discovered, that based on the remaining native supplies, the natives had expected a lengthy engagement. The Americans found piles of hollowed out calabashes filled with water, burnt yams and charred pigs. Discarded muskets, spears, and clubs littered the floor of the ditch. The weapons were pilled up on a pyre and immolated. After searching the still standing huts, Underwood's bloody cap was discovered. Out of the bodies only four or five survived being burnt to ashes including a little girl and the chief of Sualib. The preservation of the chief's cadaver was soon ended, as with a streak of vengeance, the Americans threw his body into a burning house.

Evidence of the horror that had occurred before was still present to the senses of the Americans. The treeline was pierced by misfired arrows. The smoke filled the nostrils of the sailors and marines which took on the smell of burnt human flesh, as it approached the heavens in an otherwise blue sky. It was in this setting that the otherwise exhausted combatants decided to rest and refresh themselves on coconuts to quench their thirst. While the men drank, it was discovered that the most significant injury among them was a sailor who suffered a solitary gash on the leg from an arrow.

=== The rendezvous of Ringgold and Wilkes ===
After the brief respite, the force divided into the marching lines to the nearby village of Arro and burned several houses and farms along the way. It was suspected that most of the surviving villagers were hiding somewhere in the hills. However, they did encounter one native on the way who was instantly bayonetted multiple times to death. Upon arriving there, they found that Arro had already been burned down by Wilkes and Alden. Adding the bayoneted man as a casualty and counting the lowest and highest estimate, approximately 58 to about 88 Fijians had been killed between Arro and Sualib.

=== Final engagement ===
The last skirmish that occurred during the battle lasted throughout much of the day. After midday, Lieutenant Emmons had been tracking five canoes that had been spotted in the morning. They had escaped Malolo, and were hiding near Malolo Lailai. Each canoe contained about eight fighters and their sides were reinforced to curb a potential attack. Emmons was sailing his cutter which was, at this point, only at half its normal capacity. He had only seven men under his command. In any case, Emmons made full sail and pulled up alongside the closest canoe. Emmons fired the forward mounted blunderbuss and killed several natives. Emmons and another sailor jumped in the canoe, as Emmons grappled with a spear throwing native, the sailor killed him with a hatchet. One canoe got away, but the natives in the other canoes jumped overboard. After they took the plunge, they were either shot, slashed, or axed by the Americans as they swam for the shallows. Emmons sailed back to the Porpoise before midnight. In the morning it was discovered that the bodies of the natives killed by Emmons and his men were eaten by sharks.

=== Aftermath of the battle ===
The next day (July 25, 1840) Wilkes made plans with a declaration to lead a second engagement to kill "Every man on the Island", however an assembly of natives congregated on the beach near the Flying Fish. Wilkes summoned an interpreter and together they sailed on a gig to shore. As Wilkes drew nearer the crowd dispersed, leaving behind a lone native woman to treat with Wilkes. The native offered Wilkes some of Underwood and Henry's clothes, belongings, and a chicken as an offer of peace. Wilkes retrieved the recovered items from his fallen crewmen, but refused the chicken. Wilkes was under the impression that according to Fijian tradition, for a nation to be truly conquered the populace of that nation must be present to witness a peace declaration. Instead Wilkes entreated to the woman, he and his men would meet on a hill in southern Malolo to discuss peace terms with the whole tribe. If however, the remaining chiefs and peoples of Malolo did not make an appearance, then Wilkes and his men would continue the onslaught.

Around noon, Wilkes and his men climbed the hill, which perfectly overlooked views of the sheer destruction yesterday had delivered. Then, at approximately 4 P.M. a column of weeping natives (including 40 men) began to approach the hill. At first, the native would not go beyond the foot of the hill. However, Wilkes threatened to wipe them out if they did not climb the hill in an act of contrite submission. The natives crawled on their hands and knees up the hill. An old native man approached Wilkes, spoke for Malolo. He begged for mercy, and declared that his people would never attack white men again. He admitted his people were conquered and had only about 80 surviving men left. He also offered Wilkes two young native women in reparation. Wilkes gave a speech through a translator about the power of "white" people and that if a similar attack ever happened again, then he would drive the people of Malolo to extinction.

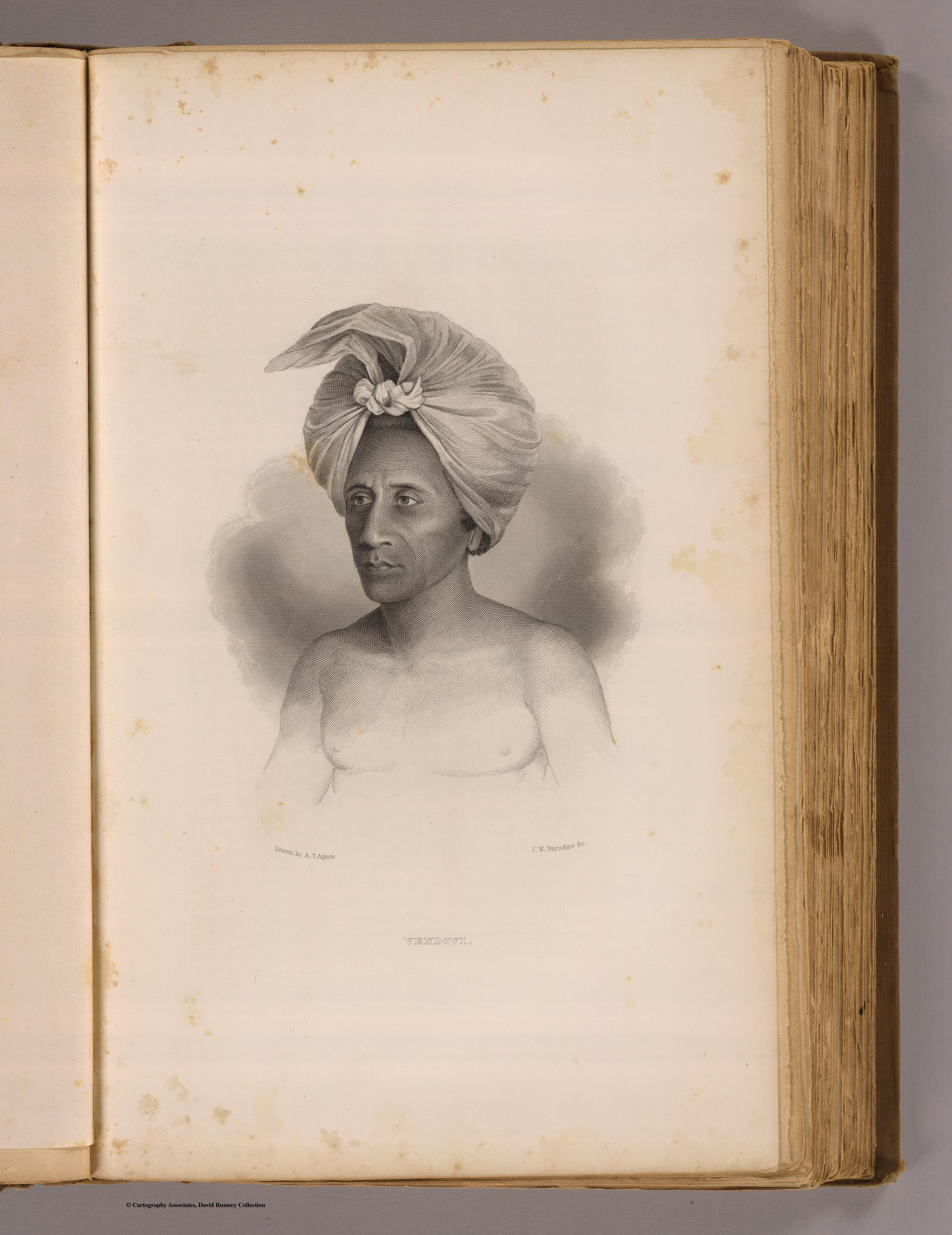
Chief Veidovi after he was given a forced shave. (Sketch by Alfred Thomas Agate)

July 26, Wilkes and his men went to what was left of Arro village and had the people fill casks of water for his vessels. On the morning of July 27, the Flying Fish and Porpoise sailed off the coast of Arro and 70 natives loaded them with 3,000 gallons of water, 12 pigs, and 3,000 coconuts. That same day the natives retrieved Underwood's pocket watch which had melted in the fire, and Henry's glasses.

On July 31, the Flying Fish and Porpoise returned to Bua bay where the rest of the fleet was working. Wilkes privately blamed Alden and Underwood for the deaths of Henry and Underwood. In retaliation Wilkes had Underwood's possessions sold at an auction to much protest from the officers, and most notably midshipman James Blair who was the executor of Underwood's freshly written will just prior to the battle of Malolo.

Wilkes vindictive streak did not appear to end with Underwood. Wilkes next turned his anger to chief Veidovi. From his capture up until the end of the expedition in Fiji, Hudson had been kind to Veidovi and even permitted him to go on deck and speak to the officers. However, Wilkes had Veidovi transferred from the Peacock to his flagship the Vincennes. Now Wilkes kept Veidovi confined to quarters. Moreover, Wilkes had the ships barber cut Vincennes hair. This mortified Veidovi, since his hair marked his status and was important in Fijian culture.

After the Ex. Ex. had ended Wilkes published a book called Narrative of the United States Exploring Expedition in 1844. Wilkes in hindsight was mad at Alden for a number of perceived grievances. One of these grievances included the idea that Alden was responsible for the deaths of Underwood and Henry. And he wrote about this an his other grievances in his book.

== Aftermath ==
=== Other stops of the Ex. Ex. ===
The Ex. Ex. left Fiji in August and set a course for more surveying and scientific work in Hawaii, before temporary splitting up the expedition to survey Hawaii and other islands in Polynesia such as modern day French Polynesia, the Cook Islands, and the Gilbert Islands. Later, the expedition surveyed the Columbia River. On the return trip the expedition traveled to Wake Island, and returned by way of the Philippines, Borneo, Singapore, Polynesia, and the Cape of Good Hope, reaching New York on June 10, 1842.

=== Fate of Chief Veidovi ===
While on the surveying expedition for the Columbia river, Wilkes appeared to have loosened his enmity to Veidovi at one point. He began allowing him on the deck of the Vincennes. A few months later on July 4th 1841 Wilkes and his men landed on Vancouver Island and fired off two howitzers in celebration of the holiday. During this occasion Veidovi was allowed to walk on shore. The next year in June, 4th 1842 Veidovi died a few days after landing in New York (possibly from pulmonary tuberculosis), although the Washington Herald inaccurately asserted that Veidovi died from a lack of eating human meat. Soon after Veidovi's death surgeons at the Brooklyn Naval Hospital removed Veidovi's head, pickled it, and then after a time the flesh was removed, and the skull was thereafter labeled Specimen 292 and was featured in the Smithsonian Institution, and became one of the most popular exhibits.

=== Prosecution ===
Soon after Wilkes' arrival in New York several court martials were organized for the entire Ex. Ex. expedition. Wilkes had made many enemies in both the Navy, and the government. He was almost universally despised by his men for many of the actions he took during the expedition. Other officers were charged with various crimes, but Wilkes was charged with 11, and his actions throughout the Ex. Ex. were criticized in the defense of the other officers.

For his actions during Fiji the Battle of Malolo, Wilkes was charged with illegally attacking the natives. Wilkes justified his actions by stating "But I felt then as I do now, that the punishment was sufficient and effectual, while it was accompanied, as far as it could be, with mercy. Some, no doubt, will look upon it as unnecessarily severe ; but if they duly considered the wanton murders that have been committed on the whites in this group of islands, merely to gratify the desire of plunder or the horrid appetite for cannibal repasts, they would scarcely think the punishment too severe." Additionally, Wilkes claimed that he called for restraint in the attacks on the Fijians, but the log books indicated that he ordered only the sparing of women and children. However, even the most ardent of Wilkes detractors supported Wilkes on this matter. Many of them indicated by their words and actions that they hated the natives for killing their friends and desired revenge. What's more, Wilkes was able to garner sympathy for the death of his nephew of which it was universally acknowledged that he loved dearly. Ultimately Wilkes was cleared of all charges including his Fiji charges. The exception was that Wilkes was found guilty of illegally flogging marines and sailors in Hawaii after they refused to work when their enlistments were up. As a consequence, Wilkes was given a public reprimand.

=== Monument ===
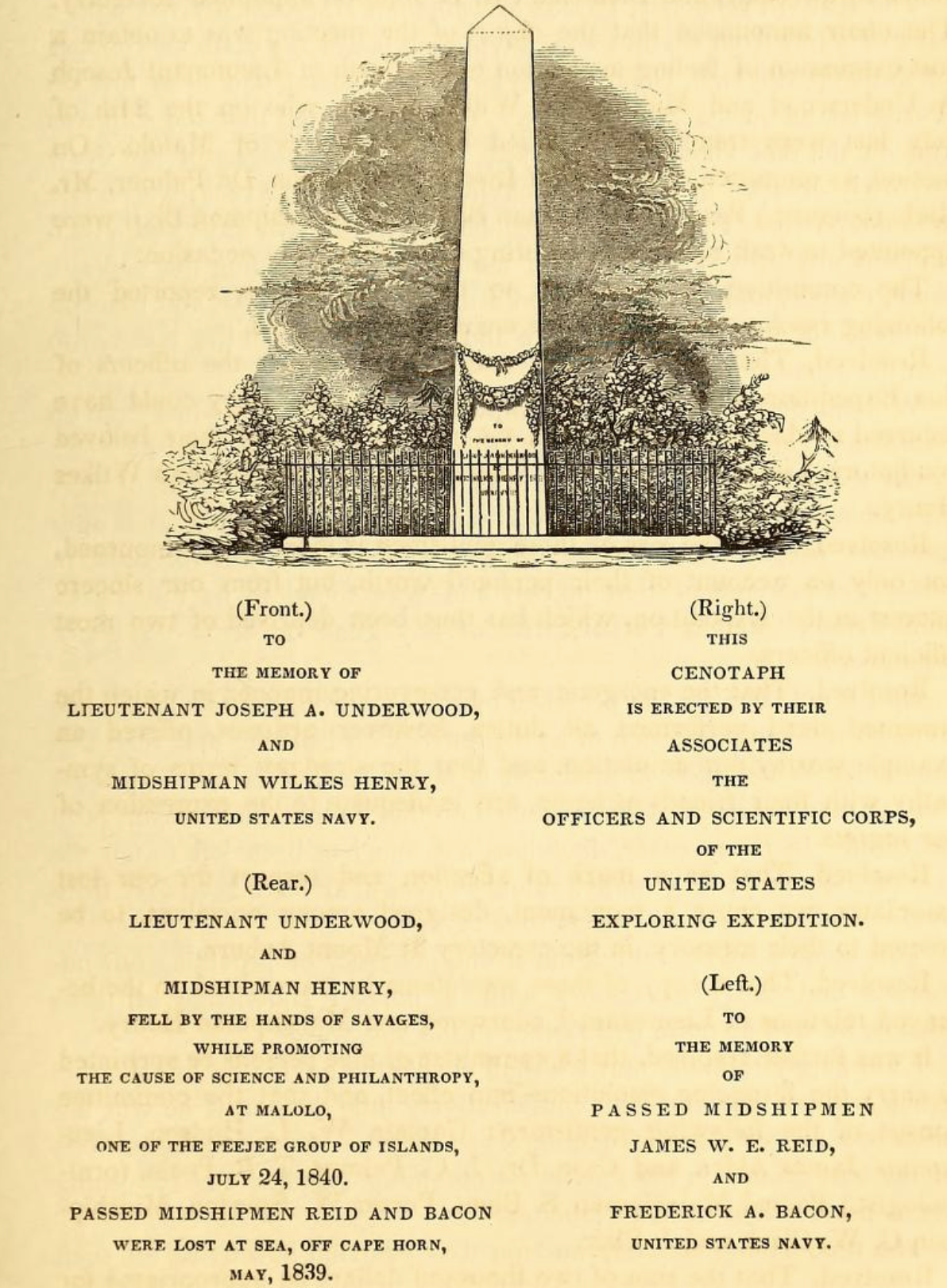
Monument to the Officers of the United States Exploring Expedition Mount Auburn Cemetery in Cambridge Massachusetts including Lieutenant Joseph Underwood and passed midshipman Henry Wilkes (Nephew of Charles Wilkes)

In 1843, a 22-foot cenotaph obelisk was built in Mount Auburn Cemetery in Cambridge Massachusetts to remember the officers who had fallen in the Ex. Ex. More specifically, the monument memorialized the loss of life in two separate events of the Ex. Ex. This included the loss of the USS Sea Gull (1838) a schooner that was Captained by Midshipman James W. Reid with the help of Midshipman Frederick A. Bacon. The Sea Gull was awaiting resupply from the USS Relief (1836), after which she was due to rendezvous with the rest of the fleet at Valparaíso, Chile. She was last spotted off Cape Horn at Midnight on 28 April 1839. After a while when the Sea Gull never returned the Ex. Ex. assumed all souls were lost.

While one side of the obelisk commemorates the memory of the officers of the Sea Gull, another preserves the memory of Henry Wilkes and Joseph Underwood killed during the first day of the battle of Malolo. The Officers and Scientific Corps. of the expedition took up a collection for their fallen comrades by the end of the Ex. Ex. Wilkes and his family desired that this monument should be constructed at a cemetery in Brooklyn, New York for the benefit of Henry's mother and sister who lived near by. However, in part due to spite over Wilkes' treatment of them the officers had the monument built in Cambridge close to Underwood's widow.

Specifically the Obelisk reads: "To the memory of Lieutenant Joseph A. Underwood and Midshipman Wilkes Henry, U. S. N. To the memory of passed midshipmen Jas. W. E. Reid and Frederick A. Bacon, U. S. N. This cenotaph is erected by their associates, the officers and scientific corps of the U. Exploring Expedition. Lieutenant Underwood and Midshipman Henry fell by the hands of savages, while promoting the cause of science and philanthropy, at Malolo, one of the Fiji Group of Islands, July 24, 1840, passed midshipmen Reid and Bacon were lost at sea, off Cane Horn, May, 1839."

=== Missionary work ===
The Methodist missionary Reverend David Cargill reported to Hudson that because of the arrest of Veidovi, the other chiefs of Rewa became terrified at the prospect of harming white people. And that this show of strength served to aid in both Western trade and missionary work.

=== Rise of the Beachcombers ===
For his political, translation, and informative aid in the expedition Wilkes made David Whippey the temporary consul of the United States in Fiji. Later, a more formal consul named John B. Williams was made the consul. However, with Wilkes' recommendation Secretary of State John C. Calhoun appointed him to vice consul of Fiji. According to Dr. Nancy Shoemaker, she theorizes the combination of the Fijians newfound fear of retribution for attacks against Westerners following the attacks of the Ex. Ex.. combined with Whippey's new position of power provided a lasting impact on Fiji. In that vein of thought, Shoemaker points out that Whippey's new found power complemented his unofficial title as chief of the white men/beachcombers of Levuka and the Royal Messenger of Bau village. With this fusion of power came a desire for autonomy for both Whippey and the white beachcombers he represented.

Traditionally, the beachcombers were compelled to fight for whichever local chief had them under employment. However, when chief Cakobau of Bau called them up to aid in him waging war against Cakaudrove at Somosomo, the beachcombers refused. They claimed they wished to protect their property. Cakobau became incensed, and was even more so after he lost the war against Cakaudrove. However, Cakobau was left in a bind. He feared that directly punishing Whippey and his beachcombers might bring down the wrath of the United States or another western power. Instead his punishment of the beachcombers was indirect and subtle. He encouraged other tribes under his domain to steal the beachcombers polygamous wives. He later demanded greater tributes from them and sent arsonists to burn down their homes.

The situation became exasperated when in 1843, the beachcombers refused to participate in the Bau–Rewa war. This time Cakobau exiled the whites and their mixed-race children to Bua and near the village of Solevu that was destroyed by the Ex. Ex.. However, by 1849, Cakobau allowed the beachcombers to return to Levuka. Trade in Levuka had suffered since the exile. The beachcombers were all to often, the most reliable middlemen traders for Fijians and the trade ships that came through Fiji. To Cakobau's dismay upon the beachcombers return they began to dominate all foreign trade to the exclusion of Cakobau and the Fijian people as a whole. The beachcombers under Whippey began defending themselves against small skirmishes or arsons as advanced by Cakobau. At this point beachcombers like Whippey, and their mixed families, had begun to transcend from being middleman minorities to autonomous settlers. The beachcombers at Levuka and elsewhere gradually made moves to separate themselves from the Fijian populace and became a semi independent military and trading power. The British would later capitalize upon this development, when they took ownership of it in 1874 and made Levuka its first capital. However, according to Shoemaker, it was the Ex. Ex.'s precedent for protection and subsequent retaliation for harm against whites that began the beachcombers move towards autonomy and the later British take over of the islands.

=== Legacy ===
The Ex. Ex. taken as a whole led to several lasting scientific revelations, explorative discoveries, and historical preservations that continue to endure to today. The Fiji expedition was no exception. The Fiji expeditions artifacts contributed to the earliest collections for the National Institute for the Promotion of Science, the precursor to what would become the Smithsonian Institution. In addition to the cannibalized skull and the skull of chief Veidovi, an assortment of Fijian weapons had been procured for future display at the institute. Wilkes names the Ringgold Isles after Lieutenant Cadwalader Ringgold. Numerous botanical samples were also obtained from Fiji and other lands the Ex. Ex. surveyed, and were placed in the United States Botanic Garden or the Smithsonian Gardens. Dried plant specimens comprised the core of what is now the National Herbarium, an herbarium curated by the Smithsonian Institution's National Museum of Natural History.

The Fiji Expedition was also not without its merits, for its contributions to science. As mentioned previously, Horatio Hale documented 5,600 words in the Fiji language as well as other information of anthological and cultural importance. Through his studies he produced the book Ethnography and Philology (1846), which is said to have laid the foundations of the ethnography of Polynesia, including Fiji. He is often cited as the Father of Polynesian ethnology. Moreover, the scientists Charles Pickering, William Brackenridge, and William Rich, collectively brought over 50,000 specimens of 10,000 species. And of the 241 charts that were created during the Ex. Ex. there was included the first ever complete chart of Fiji.

== See also ==
- European and American voyages of scientific exploration
- 1855 Fiji expedition
- 1858 Fiji expedition
