= Burning of Solevu and Tye =

- Part of United States Exploring Expedition, the 1840 Fiji expedition and the Fiji expeditions
Date	July 12, 1840
Location	20 miles southeast of Bua bay, Vanua Levu, Fiji
Result	Villages of Solevu and Tye burned

Belligerents
United States	Fijians

Commanders and leaders
Charles Wilkes	Unknown Fijian Chief

Strength
Land: 80 men Sea: 11 boats and 1 U.S. Schooner	Land: 150–200 men

Casualties and losses
None	None

The Burning of Solevu and Tye was the first of two punitive expeditions that during the 1840 Fiji expedition of the overall United States Exploring Expedition (a.k.a. the Wilkes Expedition or the Ex. Ex.) between the United States Navy and Marine Corps vs the aforementioned Fijian villages. The catalyst for the burning occurred when a two boat American survey party led by Lieutenant Oliver Hazard Perry, Jr. (of the Perry Family) and passed midshipman Samuel R. Knox were attacked and robbed of one of their boats by a group of natives in Solevu bay 20 miles southeast of Bua by on Vanua Levu. Wilkes attempted to negotiate with the natives and succeeded in acquiring the boat. However when it was discovered that none of the surveying equipment or the men's possessions were included in the boat, he ordered that the villages of Solevu and the nearby village of Tye be put to the torch.

== Background ==
=== Background of the 1st Fijian Expedition ===
The Ex. Ex. under the command of Lieutenant Charles Wilkes had just discovered that Antarctica was a continent, and finished surveying Wilkes Land. Now that the Antarctic discoveries were finished, Wilkes' fleet traveled to Sydney, Australia, then to the Bay of Islands, New Zealand, and finally they rendezvoused at Tongatapu, in Tonga, and prepared for their next mission in Fiji.

Fiji was of interest to the United States in that New England merchants and whalers frequented Fiji for its whale and sandalwood, and competed with the British and the French for the bêche-de-mer populations to sell in China. However, Fiji possessed many uncharted reefs, rocks, and currents, with a culture well known for its cannibalism (in fact for a while Fiji was also known as the Cannibal Isles),and a noted penchant for dragging boats to shore and killing all on board. No dependable navigation charts existed, and in the 12 years prior to 1840 8 ships (5 of them being American) had been destroyed in the area. These conditions made travel to and around these Islands so precarious, that the East India Marine Society of Salem, Massachusetts, United States had petitioned the federal government for local charts for sailors navigating these waters.

By the time of Wilkes arrival in Fiji on May 4, 1840, Wilkes had already had his four ships refitted at Sydney. His current fleet at the time of the Fiji expedition consisted of Wilkes' flagship the USS Vincennes (sloop-of-war, 780 tons, 18 guns), the USS Peacock (sloop-of-war, 650 tons, 22 guns), the USS Porpoise (brig, 230 tons, 10 guns), and the USS Flying Fish (schooner, 96 tons, 2 guns).

Wilkes' fleet set sail out of Nukuʻalofa on May 4 of that year. He dispatched the Porpoise under Lieutenant Cadwalader Ringgold to the Lau Group of the Fiji Islands, while the rest of the fleet went to the Koro Sea. The 3 ships headed for the Island of Ovalau, but by the morning of May 7, the Flying Fish under the command of Lieutenant George Sinclair went missing, after it got caught on a reef. Wilkes pressed on with the Peacock and the Vincennes and anchored by the village Levuka, and from there began their work of surveying the islands.

=== Background of the Burning of Solevu and Tye ===
On July 11, the Vincenees, Flying Fish, and Peacock were surveying in Bua Bay, near Bua village, Vanua Levu. Wilkes dispatched, Lieutenant Oliver Hazard Perry, Jr. (of the Perry Family) and passed midshipman Samuel R. Knox 20 miles southeast, to lead a two cutter survey to chart Solevu bay. (Note: This Solevu bay and village in Viti Levu 20 miles to the South of Bau bay, should not be confused with the more modern Solevu village on Malolo Island located to the South of modern day Yaro/Arro.) The pair and their crews had been stuck in the bay by a storm for numerous days, with dwindling supplies. While the boats were anchored a group of natives taunted them threateningly from the beach. Eventually their food ran out and both Perry and Knox felt compelled to escape. Knox made a lone attempt with his crew. The winds blew hard as the crew made for the shore. Upon disembarking the boat, the sailors were encircled by several natives with clubs, spears, and a small amount of firearms. The crews gunpowder was wet and so if it came down to a fight the crew would need to resort to hand-to-hand combat. However in an unprecedented move by Western accounts the chief in charge of the natives took pity on the explorers. Knox and his men swam back to Perry's boat, which became overloaded.

As night fell, the natives lit fires on the beach and occasionally took pot shots at Perry and his men. In the cover of night, the natives stealthily began diving and swimming to the boat, and attempted to either lift the anchor or cut the anchor chain to drag the boat ashore. The sailors began firing into the water, and eventually were able to capture 2 of the tribesmen who swam to the boat and made an effort to appear to be allies. Perry suspected them as spies and so arrested them. It turned out they were both chiefs one of high rank and one of low rank. Upon taking these men hostage, the natives on the shore made no more attempts to go after the boat that night. It was supposed that they feared the death of their chiefs. When morning came Perry made a second attempt to escape the bay. This time he attempted to maneuver his cutter around the shallow reefs and into the open ocean. The Natives, realizing what Perry was attempting to accomplish, assembled around the edges of the reef. At one point the boat struck the reef and took on water. The men attempted to bail and keep their distance from the natives.

Perry was able to escape with his crew and prisoners. On July 12, Perry met with the Vincennes, Flying Fish, and Peacock which had all rendezvoused at Bua Bay. After learning what had happened, Wilkes assembled 11 boats, 80 men, and the Flying Fish to exact retribution, and retrieve the stolen cutter. These boats were an assortment of gigs, cutters, and whaleboats,originally prepared for travel against the hazardous reefs for exploring purposes. Each of the vessels were given surveying equipment and a supply of forward mounted blunderbusses, and a number of them were furnished with congreve rocket artillery frames.

== Burning of the villages ==
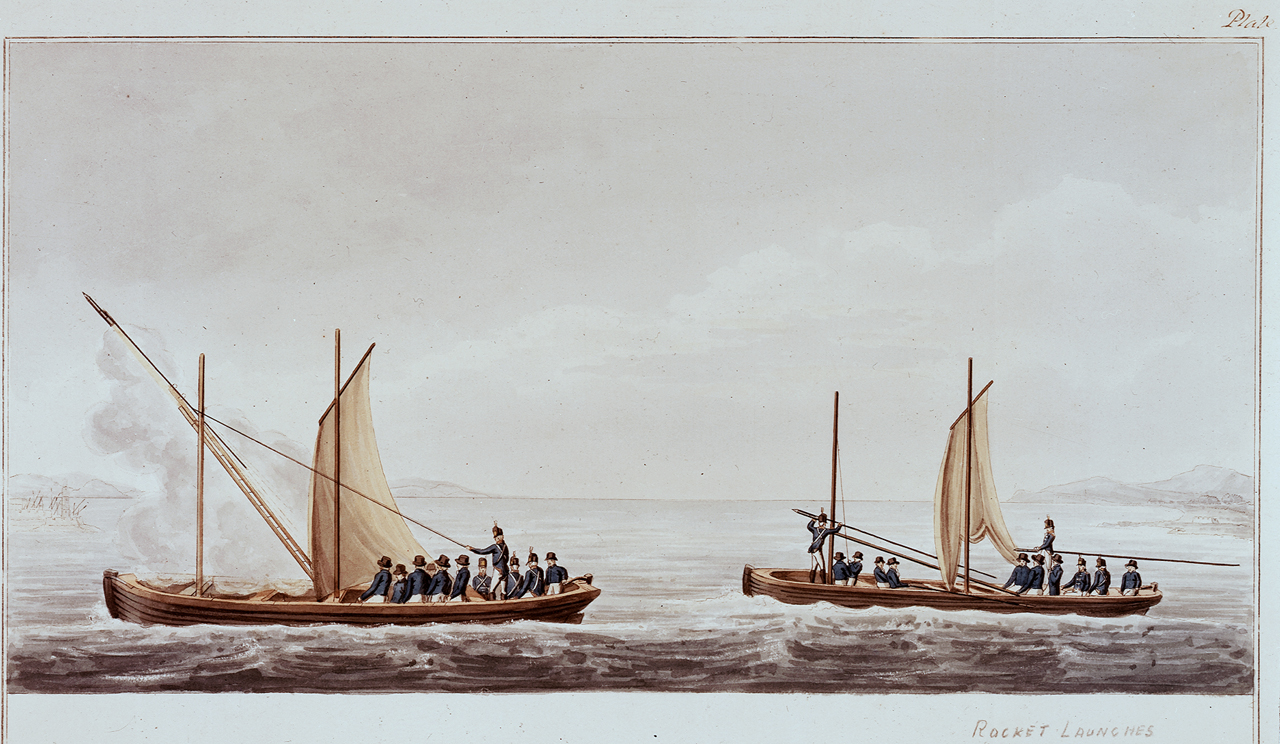
"Use of rockets from boats" – An illustration from Sir William Congreve's book. (In both the Burning of Solevu and Tye and the Battle of Malolo the U.S. Navy implemented Congreve rockets in order to burn down enemy villages. The Fijians called them "Curlew" [Meaning Spirits] or "Flying Devils")

Wilkes' flotilla arrived in the afternoon at low tide. As the waters were shallow a mudflat had formed between Wilkes' ships and the stolen cutter. Wilkes met with the chiefs representatives and used David Whippey (a hired beachcomber) as a translator. Wilkes commanded the natives to return the boat and all items that were in it. The natives were intimidated as up until this point in Fijian history there was never before a time when so many westerners had gathered threatening war. The chief returned the boat, but did not return the boats equipment and belongings of the crew.

Outraged Wilkes landed most of his men armed with muskets, but remained on a gig from which he would direct a Congreve rocket. Wilkes ordered the burning of Solevu village and the politically linked nearby village of Tye. Combined the fighters of these villages were between 150-200 warriors. However, both the warriors and the populace fled into the hills and Wilkes fired rockets into the village. The villages were destroyed, but due to the simplicity of the villages' material, the structures would be repaired in a few weeks. Aside from loss or damage to property no side suffered any casualties.

Following the burning of the villages, and in an act of good will, Wilkes released the two captured chiefs and bestowed them with valuable gifts. His logic was that they came bearing friendship and aid to Perry's crew. This was also done to demonstrate to the natives that hostility to Americans (and white people in general) would be met with vengeance, and cordiality met with reward.

== Aftermath ==
Later that same July, part of the Ex. Ex. flotilia soon moved on from Solevu to the Mamanuca Islands to continue their survey mission, while the Vincennes and Peacock deployed to Muthuata Island. There a surveying group of two ships under the command of Lieutenant Joseph Underwood had just finished surveying Drawaqa Island at the southern most end of the Yasawa Islands. His men were short on food and decided to negotiate with the local Fijans of Sualib village on the Island of Malolo.

Ultimately the negotiations deteriorated and both sides engaged in combat with Underwood and Wilkes nephew Wilkes Henry being slain, along with ten other natives, which began the two day battle of Malolo. Wilkes had the men buried the next day and led the rest of the battle the following day and inflicted severe casualties to the natives of Sualib and the affiliated Arro village. Once vengeance was concluded Wilkes made the survivors pay with work and supplies over the next few days. Soon after the Fijian expedition ended. The ships departed on August 11, 1840, and headed for other parts of Polynesia.

== See also ==
- Trent Affair
- 1855 Fiji expedition
- 1859 Fiji expedition
