= List of shipwrecks in June 1825 =

The list of shipwrecks in June 1825 includes some ships sunk, wrecked or otherwise lost during June 1825.

== 1 June ==
List of shipwrecks: 1 June 1825
Ship	State	Description
Eliza	United Kingdom	The ship capsized off Ailsa Craig in a squall with the loss of a crew member. She was on a voyage from Sligo to Liverpool, Lancashire.
Jean	United Kingdom	The sloop struck the Beacon Rocks, in the River Nith at Dumfries and sank.

== 3 June ==
List of shipwrecks: 3 June 1825
Ship	State	Description
Francis Currell	United States	The schooner was wrecked north of Cape Hatteras, North Carolina. Her crew were rescued. She was on a voyage from Antigua to Baltimore, Maryland.

== 4 June ==
List of shipwrecks: 4 June 1825
Ship	State	Description
Endeavour	(United Kingdom of Great Britain and Ireland) Jamaica	The drogging sloop was driven ashore in Morant Bay.
Recover	United States	The ship was wrecked on the Rum Quay. All on board were rescued. She was on a voyage from Jamaica to New York City.

== 5 June ==
List of shipwrecks: 5 June 1825
Ship	State	Description
Gabrielle	France	The ship was driven ashore at Quillebeuf-sur-Seine, Eure.
William & George	United Kingdom	The ship was driven ashore at Southport, Lancashire. She was on a voyage from Galway to Liverpool, Lancashire.

== 10 June ==
List of shipwrecks: 10 June 1825
Ship	State	Description
Calder	United Kingdom	The brig was lost at Valparaíso, Chile.
Valparaiso	Chile	The ship was lost at Valparaíso.

== 11 June ==
List of shipwrecks: 11 June 1825
Ship	State	Description
Aurora	Spain	The ship was lost on Zanzibar.
Royal Charlotte	United Kingdom India	The full-rigged ship was wrecked on the Frederick Reefs, off the coast of New South Wales (modern Queensland) with the loss of two lives.
Valdivia	Chilean Navy	The frigate foundered off Valparaíso.

== 12 June ==
List of shipwrecks: 12 June 1825
Ship	State	Description
Sir Charles Forbes	United Kingdom	The ship was driven ashore and severely damaged at Sydney, New South Wales. She was on a voyage from Sydney to Madras, India.
Lord Palmerston	United Kingdom	The steamship ran around on the Nash Sand, in the Bristol Channel. All on board, over 200 people, were rescued. She was later refloated. Lord Palmerston was on a voyage from Dublin to Bristol, Gloucestershire.

== 17 June ==
List of shipwrecks: 17 June 1825
Ship	State	Description
Hercules	Sweden	The ship was damaged on the Kopper Grandel, in the Baltic Sea. She was on a voyage from Gävle to Alicante, Sain. Hercules put into Gothenburg for repairs.
Neptune	United Kingdom	The ship was wrecked on the coast of Portugal. Her crew were rescued by Neptune (France). She was on a voyage from Zakynthos, Greece to Falmouth, Cornwall.
Vrow Catharina	Norway	The ship foundered in the North Sea. Her crew were rescued by a Danish fishing vessel. She was on a voyage from Hull, Yorkshire to Dram.

== 18 June ==
List of shipwrecks: 18 June 1825
Ship	State	Description
South Esk	United Kingdom	The ship was driven ashore east of Faro, Portugal. She was on a voyage from Alicante, Spain to Liverpool, Lancashire. South Esk was refloated on 23 June and taken in to Faro for repairs.

== 21 June ==
List of shipwrecks: 21 June 1825
Ship	State	Description
Gratitude	United Kingdom	The schooner was wrecked on the Stag Rock, off the coast of Cornwall with the loss of two lives. She was on a voyage from Plymouth, Devon to Newport, Monmouthshire.
Maldon	United Kingdom	The ship was wrecked on the Shipwash Sand, in the North Sea off the coast of Essex. Her crew were rescued. She was on a voyage from Grangemouth, Stirlingshire to London.

== 22 June ==
List of shipwrecks: 22 June 1825
Ship	State	Description
Nereide	(United Kingdom of Great Britain and Ireland) New South Wales	The cutter was driven ashore and wrecked 10 nautical miles (19 km) north of Newcastle. She was on a voyage from Sydney to the East Indies.

== 25 June ==
List of shipwrecks: 25 June 1825
Ship	State	Description
Hector	United States	The ship was wrecked on Saint Domingo. Her crew were rescued.
Malta	United Kingdom	The ship collided with Sally (United States) and foundered with the loss of six lives. Malta was on a voyage from Bristol, Gloucestershire to Montreal, Lower Canada, British North America.
Pheasant	United Kingdom	The ship ran aground in the River Suir. She was on a voyage from Waterford to Arundel, Sussex.

== 27 June ==
List of shipwrecks: 27 June 1825
Ship	State	Description
Amerique	France	The ship was driven ashore on Barbuda. She was on a voyage from Guadeloupe to Bordeaux, Gironde. Amerique was later refloated and put into Saint Thomas, Virgin Islands for repairs.
Mason's Daughter	United States	The ship was captured by pirates. She was deliberately wrecked on the Anegado Shoals. She was on a voyage from Gibraltar to Tampico, Mexico.
Robert Kerr	United Kingdom	The ship ran aground on the Red Island Reef, in the Saint Lawrence River. She was later refloated and put back to Quebec City, Lower Canada, British North America, for repairs.

== 28 June ==
List of shipwrecks: 28 June 1825
Ship	State	Description
Success	United Kingdom	The ship ran aground at Truro, Cornwall and was severely damaged.

== 29 June ==
List of shipwrecks: 29 June 1825
Ship	State	Description
Caroline	United Kingdom	The ship was off Dover while sailing from London to New Brunswick when she ran afoul of Lord Hungerford (United Kingdom). Caroline lost her bowsprit and had to put back to the Downs.

== 30 June ==
List of shipwrecks: 30 June 1825
Ship	State	Description
Apollo	flag unknown	The ship ran aground off Visby, Sweden and was damaged. She was on a voyage from St. Ubes. Portugal to a Baltic port. Apollo was refloated and taken in to Visby for repairs.
Auspicious	United Kingdom	The ship was driven ashore and sank near Rampside, Lancashire. She was on a voyage from London to Lancaster, Lancashire.

== Unknown date ==
List of shipwrecks: Unknown date in June 1825
Ship	State	Description
Active	United States	The ship was wrecked at Ocracoke, North Carolina. She was on a voyage from Portland, Oregon to Demerara.
Horatio	United Kingdom	The brig was destroyed by an explosion at Singapore with the loss of all hands. Her captain survived as he was ashore.
Palmerston	United Kingdom	The steamship was wrecked at Nash Point, Glamorgan, All on board, in excess of 200 people, were rescued.
