= Tiger (1813 ship) =

1813 US/UK sailing cargo ship

History

United Kingdom
- Name: Tiger
- Acquired: 1813 by purchase of a prize
- Fate: Last listed in 1833

General characteristics
- Tons burthen: 325, or 327, or 32768/94, or 330 (bm)

Tiger was launched in America in 1813 and apparently captured on her maiden voyage. Captain Lewellyn purchased her in prize and initially she sailed between England and the Mediterranean. Under new ownership in the early-1820s, she started trading with New South Wales and India under a license from the British East India Company (EIC). She is last listed in 1833.

== Origins ==
Tiger apparently was launched in America in 1813. On 10 March 1813 Medusa captured the American vessel Messenger, and on 22 March the American vessel Tiger. It is highly likely that this Tiger was the Tiger condemned in the prize court on 4 May 1813 and sold to Llewellyn & Co.

== Career ==
Initially Tiger traded between England and the Mediterranean.

Year	Master	Owner	Trade	Source and notes
1814				Lloyd's Register (LR) – missing pages; Register of Shipping (RS) – no data
1815	Llewelyn	Capt. & Co.	Plymouth–London; London–Malta	LR

In February 1817 Lloyd's List reported that Tiger, Llewellyn, master, had run onshore near Gravesend while on her way to Smyrna and Constantinople. It was expected that she would have to put back to repair. Tiger, Powell, master, put into Northfleet Dock on 25 February to repair.

Year	Master	Owner	Trade	Source and notes
1818	Llewellyn; W.Powell	Llewellyn	London–Smyrna	LR; damage repaired 1817
1821	W.Powell; Brash	Captain & Co. Buckle & Co.	London–Malaga; London–Cape of Good Hope	LR; damage repaired 1817 & small repairs 1821

From around 1821 Tiger started trading with India and Australia. Tiger, Brash, master, left England in October 1821 for Van Diemen's Land (VDL), and arrived at Hobart Town on 22 January 1822, having sailed via the Cape of Good Hope. She then sailed to Port Jackson, returning to Hobart Town on 20 April. She sailed for England on 26 May with colonial produce and 4000 bushels of wheat for Cape Town.

Year	Master	Owner	Trade	Source and notes
1824	Brash; J.Duke	Buckle & Co.	London–Malaga; London–VDL	LR; damage repaired 1817 & small repairs 1821
1825	J.Duke	Buckle & Co.	London–Veracruz	LR; damage repaired 1817 & small repairs 1821
1826	J.Duke; H.Kent; Richards	Buckle & Co.	London–Veracruz	LR; small repairs 1821 & thorough repairs 1825

On 18 March 1825 Captain Kent sailed from England for Ceylon.

Lloyd's Register reported that on 9 August 1826 Captain R. Brash sailed from England for Van Diemen's Land and New South Wales. However, newspapers from Hobart Town, Van Diemen's Land, report that Tiger, Captain Thomas Richards left England on 14 December and arrived 13 April 1827 at Hobart Town. Tiger carried a wide variety of goods consigned to merchants there. Captain Richards left Hobart-Town on 4 May for Port Jackson. After she arrived at Port Jackson, she was taken up for a voyage to Calcutta.

On 11 June 1828 Tiger, Captain Richards, was at Concepción, Chile. Also in port was the brig Indefatigable, ex–Calder. On 18 August Tiger was at Tahiti where she was able to assist four men from Indefatigable who had arrived there by open boat, having been put in the boat after the Chilean crew members had mutinied on 21 July, killed Captain James Duncan, and taken her. The mutineers had retained the chief mate, Mr. Lossgreen, to navigate for them. Tiger brought the crew members she had rescued to Port Jackson around 24 September.

Tiger was carrying a cargo of wheat, tobacco, and horses. On her way to Sydney, as she neared the Australian coast, she had encountered a severe gale that damaged her spars and rigging. Two passengers on board, William Lowe and James Marshall, did such good work in assisting in the repairs to Tiger that Captain Richards refunded them their passage money. Lowe and Marshall later established a ship-building partnership. (Note: One of the vessels they built was William the Fourth.)

Year	Master	Owner	Trade	Source and notes
1830	J. Richards	Buckle & Co.	London–New South Wales	LR; small repairs 1821 & thorough repairs 1825
1833	J.Richards	Buckle & Co.	London	LR; small repairs 1821 & thorough repairs 1825
