= David Whippey =

American sailor

David Whippey (or Whippy, 1802–1871) was an American sailor from Nantucket who became a "beachcomber", a white resident of the Fijian islands who served as liaison between the local and foreign communities, and eventually was the United States vice-consul to Fiji.

Whippey left Nantucket on the whaling ship Hero in 1816, but jumped ship in Peru. In 1824 he arrived in the Fijian Islands on the brig Calder, the captain Peter Dillon then left Whippey behind to collect tortoise shell, but Dillon failed to return for 13 years. By 1826 Whippey had become Mata ki Bau (the envoy to the powerful Fijian tribe of Bau). Whippey settled in Levuka on the island of Ovalau in Fiji, married a local woman, and had at least eleven children with multiple women. He also mediated between the Fijians and white sailors.

Whippey served as the vice-consul of the United States to Fiji from 1846 to 1856.

The first attempt at commercial sugar production in Fiji was by Whippey on Wakaya Island (near Ovalau) in 1862, where he built a sugarcane mill, but this was a financial failure, as the island is small and not suited for growing sugarcane. Whippey spent the later years of his life on Wakaya until his death in 1871.
