= Meke =

Fijian dance

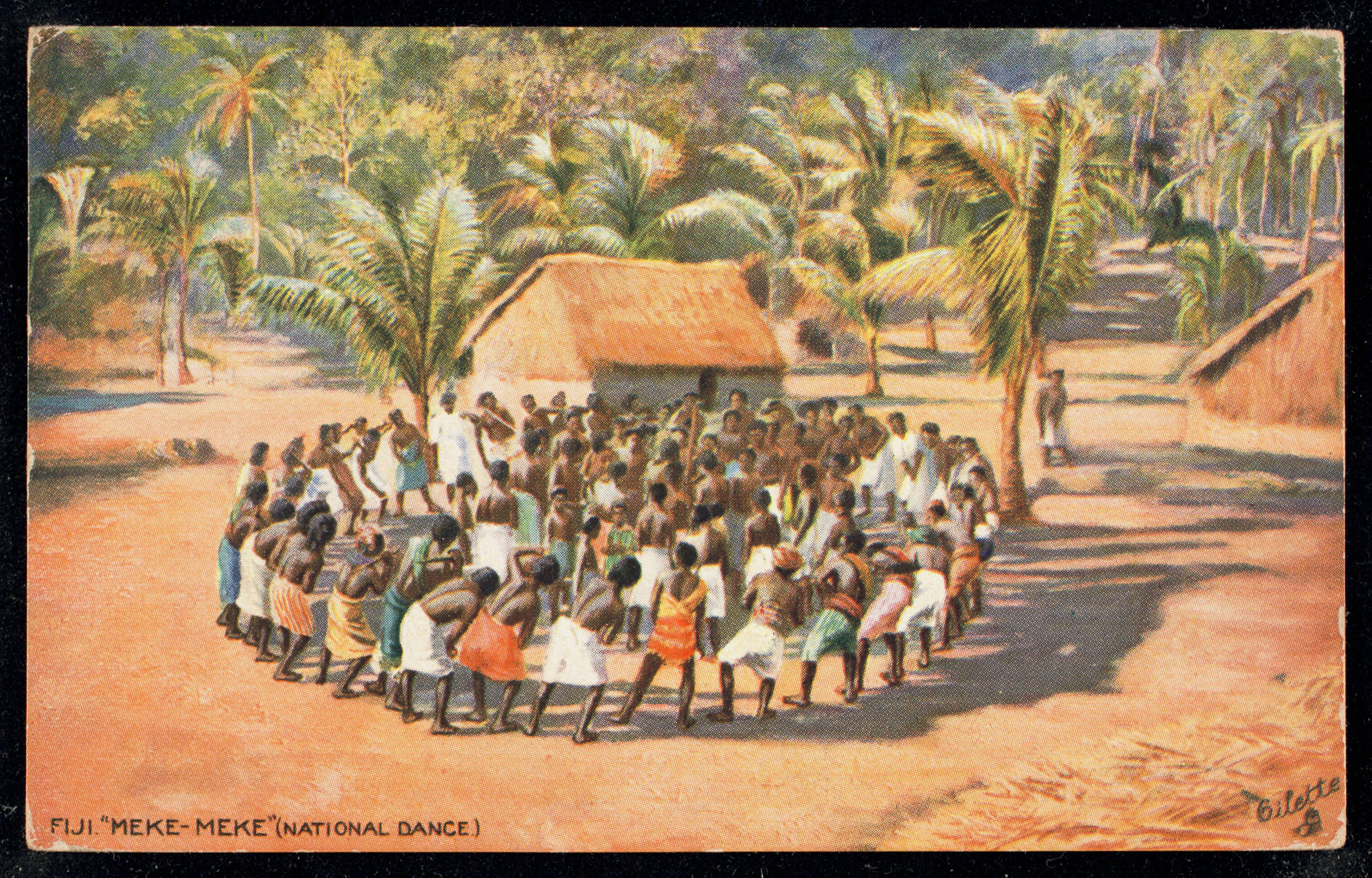
Postcard from Fiji depicting "'Meke-Meke' (National Dance)" from 1903

Meke, in the Fijian language, is all traditional style of dance. It is a cognate of the words "me’e" (Tongan) and mē in Samoan). It is typically performed during celebrations and festivals. Traditionally the dances that comprise the meke art form are performed by groups of men only or women only, however, foreign influences, such as the male/female Tongan ma'ulu'ulu becoming the Fijian vakamalolo, are evident throughout.

Friedrich Ratzel in his 1896 publication The History of Mankind, writes about the Fijian meke as both song and dance, which only a few are given to invent and which those who do, allege that they do so in the spirit world where divine beings teach them the song and the appropriate dance. He wrote that the ideal of the Fijian poet is poetry with every verse ending with the same vowel of regular measure, which in practice is often achieved with poetic license through the use of arbitrary abbreviations or lengthenings, and omission of articles.

== In popular culture ==
- A meke was performed by contestants for a reward challenge in Survivor: Fiji.
