= Calder (1821 ship) =

United Kingdom
- Name: Calder
- Owner: Originally: Barretto & Sons; 1822:Peter Dillon
- Builder: J. Vigneron & Co., Howrah
- Launched: 31 October 1821
- Fate: Wrecked 1825

Chile
- Name: Indefatigable
- Owner: James Duncan
- Acquired: By purchase of a wreck
- Fate: Mutiny 1828

Spain
- Acquired: By purchase of a prize
- Fate: Lost in a typhoon

General characteristics
- Tons burthen: 190 (bm)

Calder was a brig launched in 1821 at Calcutta. A new owner in 1822 sailed her to Australia and she then traded in the Pacific until in 1825 she sailed to Chile and was wrecked at Valparaiso. There a new owner salvaged her and returned her to sailing under the name Indefatigable. On Indefatigable's first voyage the Chilean members of her crew mutinied, killing her captain. The mutineers sailed to Guam where the authorities took Indefatigable in prize. She was later lost in a typhoon in the China Sea.

== As Calder ==
Peter Dillon purchased Calder in 1822. In July he sailed her to Hobart Town via Acheh with cargo and four prisoners, and arriving on 28 September. Then on 22 November she stopped at Port Jackson, where she landed her four prisoners.

Grounding: In January 1823 Dillon sent Calder to Coal River under the command of his Chief Mate, William Worth, to bring back logs. On 24 January Calder was driven ran aground on a reef off Nobbys Island. Dillon sailed to her assistance in the brig Fame. Lloyd's List reported that part of her cargo was saved, though apparently she was in ballast. A few days later she was gotten off with some damage.

In August 1823 Dillon and Calder were at new Zealand.

Calder, again visited Sandal Wood Bay (Bua Bay) in late December 1824, searching for sandalwood, only to find the area had been stripped of it two years earlier, and he was able to gather only about 500 pounds. Before he sailed away, Dillon left David Whippey with Vunivalu (Chief) Naulivou at Bau. Whippey was to gather beche de mer for Calder's return; Calder then sailed in January 1825, never to return. Dillon sailed via Resolution Bay at Tanna, in the New Hebrides.

Loss: Calder arrived back at Port Jackson on 25 February 1825. Dillon sailed Calder on 19 March for Chile and arrived at Valparaiso on 3 or 4 May. About a month later a gale developed that drove both the Chilean frigate Valdivia (ex-Esmeralda) and the Chilean merchantman Valparaiso on shore. As Valparaiso was blown towards shore, her anchor hooked and broke Calder's chains, with the result that Calder too wrecked on shore. Lloyd's List reported that Calder and Valparaiso had wrecked on 10 June 1825 at Valparaiso. Calder's hulk was then auctioned off to the highest bidder. (Note: George Bayly, who shipped on board Calder, has an autobiographical account of the voyage to Valparaiso, and her loss.)

== Indefatigable & mutiny ==
By 1828 the vessel that had been Calder was under the ownership of John Duncan, an English merchant at Valparaiso, He named her Indefatigable and appointed Joseph Hunter as her master. On 11 June she sailed from Concepción, Chile, for Australia with 2500 fanegas (Spanish bushels) of wheat, 60 fanegas of walnuts, and three "donkie_". The crew, in addition to the captain, consisted of two European officers and two or three seamen, and a Bengali steward who had sailed with the captain for many years, and half a dozen or more Chilenos recruited shortly before Indefatigable left harbour. Reportedly, the Chilenos resented the discipline on the ship and within a week of her departure were plotting mutiny.

On 22 July 1828 was at 17°13′S 127°51′E, about 600 miles from the Paumotu Group. During the mutiny the mutineers killed the captain and wounded the two mates and the steward. They kept Loftgreen (or Loftgren; the First Mate), to navigate Indefatigable and put Mr. Todd (the Second Mate), the carpenter, a Swedish sailor, and the steward in the ship's long boat that they provisioned with food and water for two weeks, and sent her off. Loftgreen had communicated to Todd that Todd should steer for Tahiti while he made for Manila, which he believed was the mutineer's destination, and possibly recapture the vessel with the help of the cook and another seaman, should the opportunity arise.

The Second Mate and the three other men reached Tawere Island in the Archipleago on 7 August. They stayed there for about 24 hours and were able to reprovision. On 15 August a sudden squall cost them their compass and damaged the boat and mast. Still, that evening they reached Anaa. They stayed there two days and on the 20th they reached Tahiti. The locals imprisoned them, believing that they were escaped convicts that had recently visited the islands and conducted depredations after having been treated hospitably. Fortuitously the ship Tiger, Captain Richards, was in port. Tiger and Indefatigable had been at Concepción at the same time and the officers had met. Richards vouched for the men and the natives released them. Tiger brought the crew members she had rescued to Port Jackson around 24 September.

The mutineers ordered Loftgreen to steer to Guam, not realizing that Spain had actually occupied the island. The mutineers' naive plan was to sell Indefatigable to the islanders and then settle on some Pacific island where they would live "eating, drinking, sleeping, and keeping an extensive harem". Indefatigable arrived at Guam on 12 December. Throughout the voyage Loftgreen, who understood Spanish, had to listen to the mutineers debating if and when they should kill him.

When the mutineers arrived at Guam the Spanish governor arrested them. The British frigate HMS Rainbow happened to arrive at San Luis d'Apra shortly thereafter. She took Loftgreen and the mutineers to Manila, where they arrived on 9 or 19 January 1829.

The trial in Manila lasted from end-January to end-March as the court only convened for two hours a day, with frequent 2-3 day adjournments. The court found all six mutineers guilty of murder. They were then garrotted, or hanged. Eventually Loftgreen was able to secure passage to Macao, and from there to Sydney on board Nimrod.

== Fate ==
The Spanish government condemned Indefatigable as a prize to the government. She was later lost in a typhoon in the China Sea.
