= Malolo Lailai =

Malolo Lailai Plantation Island
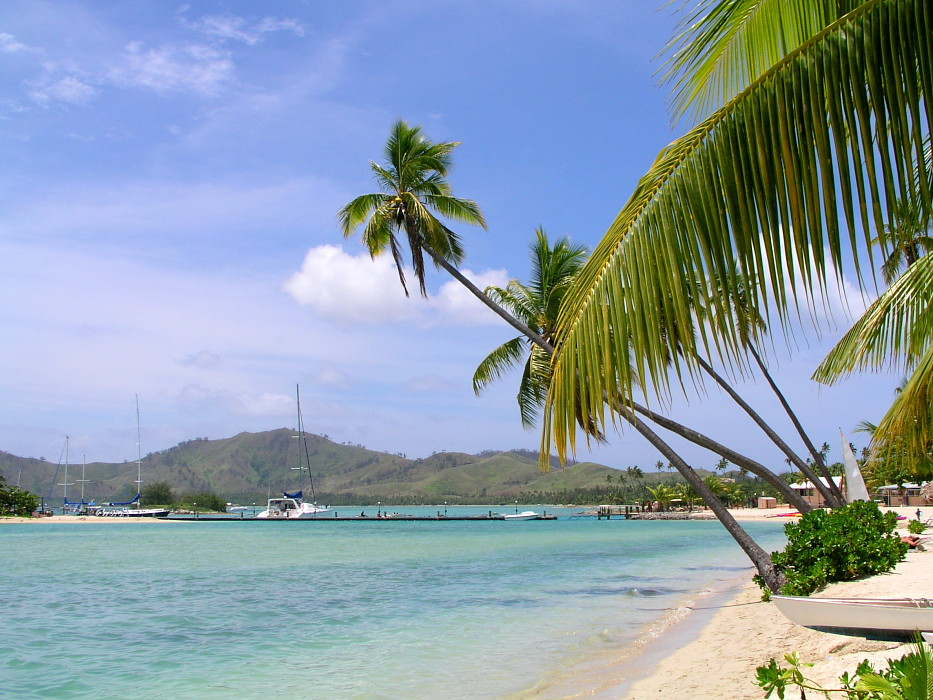
- Marina

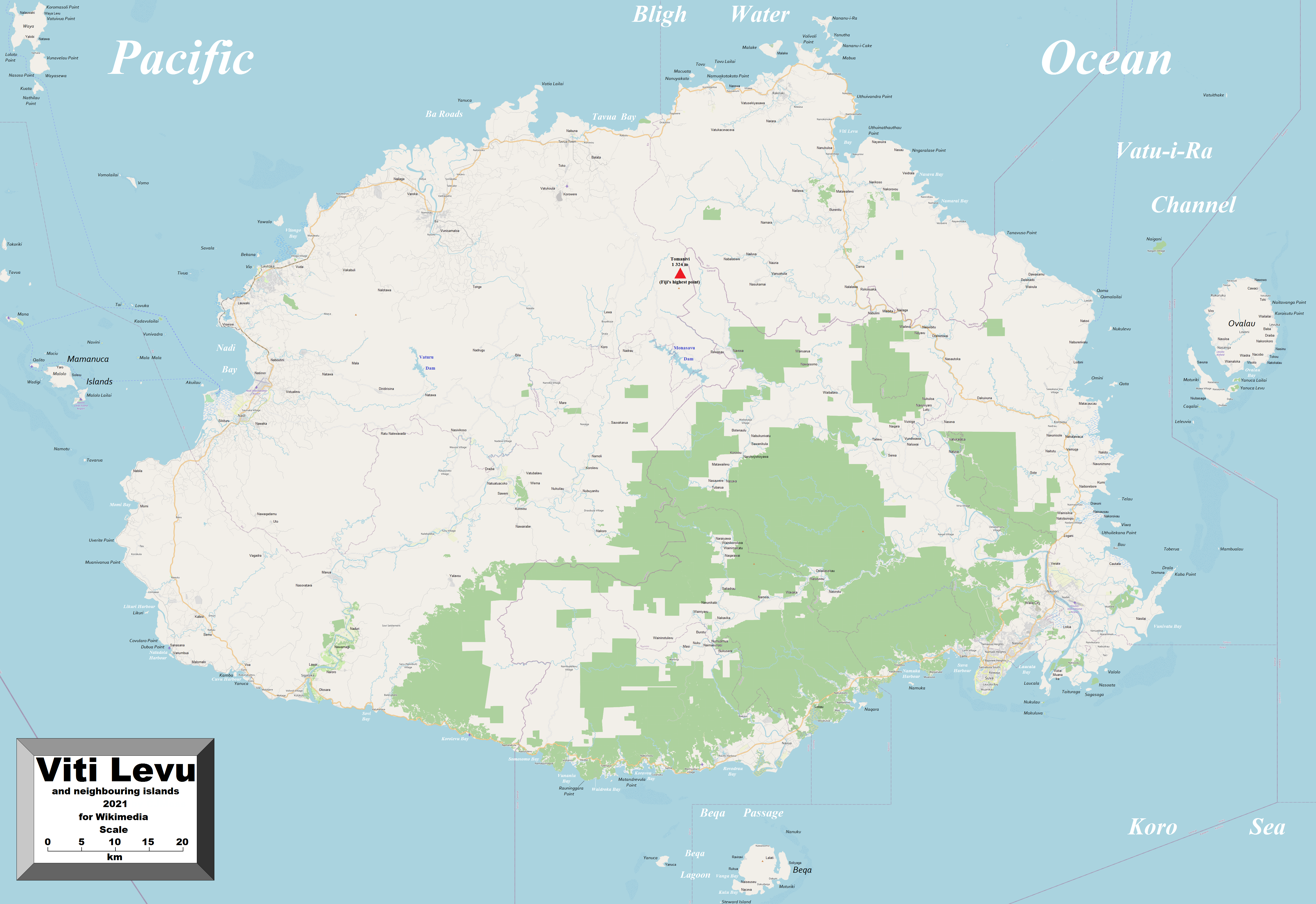
- Viti Levu with Malolo Lailai off the west coast

- Location in Fiji
- Country: Fiji
- Archipelago: Mamanuca
- Division: Western Division
- Province: Nadroga-Navosa
- District: Malolo
- Time zone: UTC+12

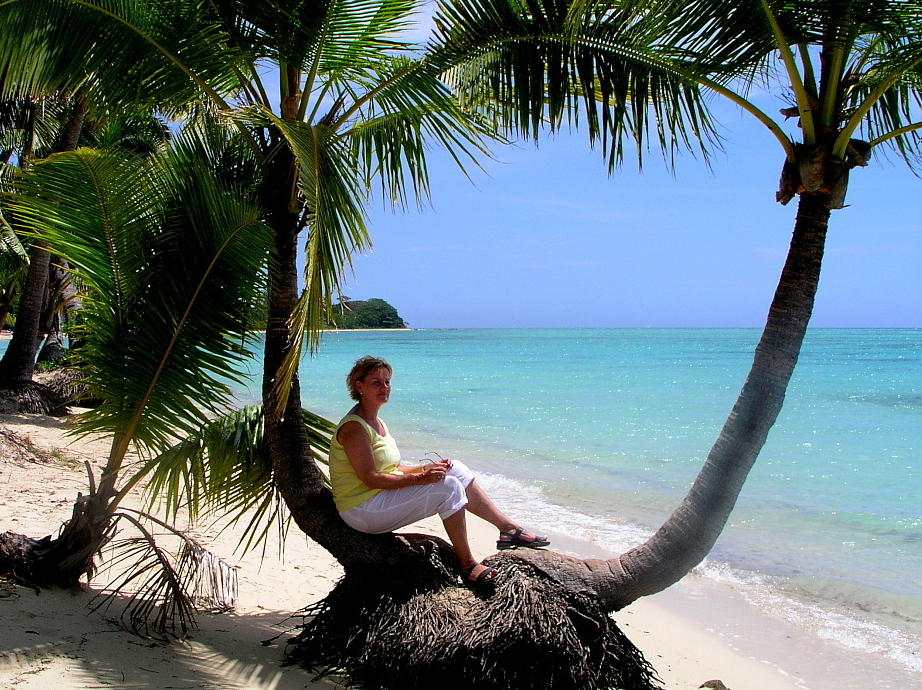
Beach

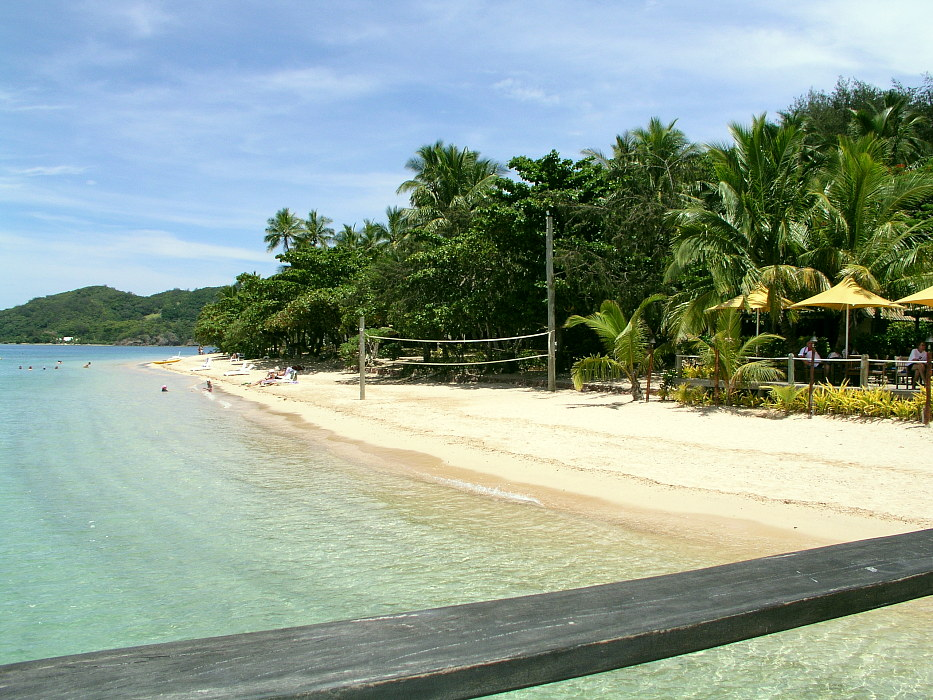
View from pier

Malolo Lailai (Little Malolo), also known as Plantation Island, is the second largest and most developed of the Mamanuca Islands, lying 20 kilometres west of Nadi on Fiji's main island Viti Levu. Malolo Lailai is the centre of tourism in the Mamanuca Islands, and consists of four resorts, a number of residential houses, a marina and a golf course.

== History ==
The Nadroga chief Ratu Kini sold the uninhabited island in 1872 to John Thomson for cotton planting. Thomson died in 1876 and the island was sold to the American Louis Armstrong; he died bankrupt, and the island fell to the Mortgage Agency of Australasia. In November 1891, they sold it to James Borron who owned several plantations throughout Fiji and who leased Malolo Lailai to the Chinese family Wong Ket for 70 years to plant coconut palms and harvest copra. In the early 1960s, the island was sold to Richard "Dick" Smith, Reginald Raffe and Sir Ian MacFarlane. They parted ways in the early 1970s to develop their own part of the island. At about this time, the airstrip was built. In 1969, Reg Raffe opened Plantation Village Resort, now Plantation Island Resort, with six rooms. In 2004 his children opened a boutique adults only resort called Lomani Island Resort.

Smith started to build Musket Cove, and it opened on 3 October 1975 with twelve bures. The resort's restaurant is called Dick's Place in honour of Smith who died, aged 81, in July 2012 on the island. In 2000, MacFarlane sold his parcel of the island to the other two partners and those 400 acres (162 ha) are now used for organic farming and the continuation of the coconut plantation for the supply of the resorts.

== Transportation ==
The island can be reached in 50 minutes from Port Denarau by the Malolo Cat, a catamaran, or by Malolo Lailai Airport, a 10-minute flight from Nadi International Airport. Separated by a small isthmus which can be walked at low tide, the larger island of Malolo Levu lies north-west of Malolo Lailai.

== Tourism ==
The island is home to four resorts: Musket Cove Island Resort, Plantation Island Resort, Lomani Island Resort, and the timeshare facility Malolo Lailai Lagoon Resort. Restaurants on the island are provided at Musket Cove (2), Plantation Island (3) and Lomani; Musket Cove and Plantation Island provide a convenience store, some tourist shops, excursions, water activities including diving, fishing, surfing trips to the reef, and others. The marina is operated by Musket Cove.
