= Peter Dillon =

French sea captain (1788–1847)

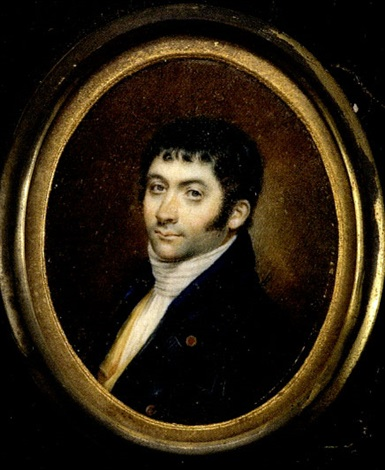
- Dillon in 1802
- Born: 15 June 1788; Martinique
- Died: 9 February 1847 (aged 58); Paris, France
- Occupations: Sea captain, writer

Peter Dillon (15 June 1788 – 9 February 1847) was a French sea captain engaged in the merchant trade, explorer and writer. Dillon discovered in 1826–27 the fate of the La Pérouse expedition.

== Early career ==
Peter Dillon was born in Martinique, France, the son and namesake of an Irish immigrant. Not much is known of his early life. He claimed to have joined the Royal Navy at one point and to have served at Trafalgar. He left the Royal Navy and made his way to Calcutta as a young man, eventually becoming a trader in the South Seas.

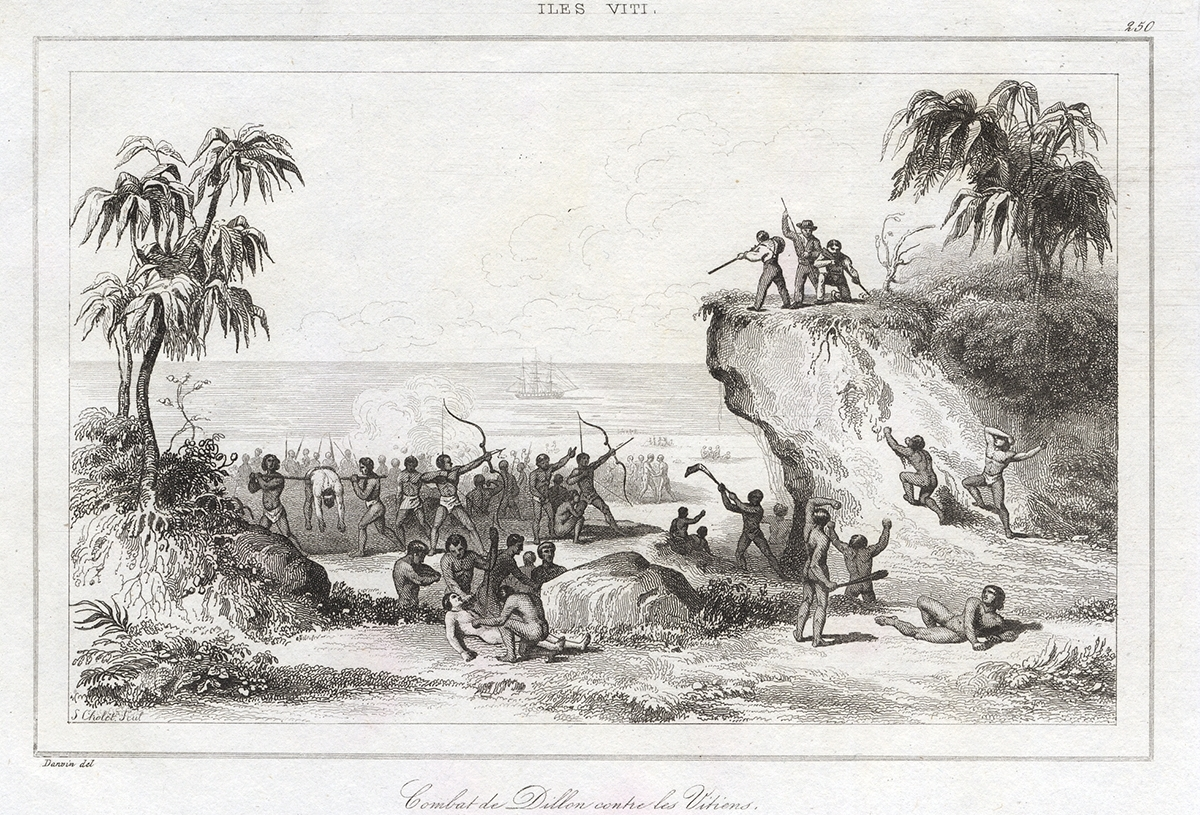
1836 illustration of the battle at Dillon's Rock

In 1813, he sailed to Fiji as third mate in the Hunter under Captain James Robson to look for sandalwood. While there, tensions between the Europeans and the Fijians escalated into violence that cost the lives of many on both sides. Dillon recounted the events of this battle in his Narrative and Successful Result of a Voyage to the South Seas (1829). In it he describes holding out with five other people, including Charles Savage, on a rock later called "Dillon's Rock" while native Fijians prepared a cannibal feast of Dillon's fallen comrades.

During his time as a trader, at least two of his ships were wrecked: Phatisalam on 9 July 1821, and Calder on 10 June 1825.

== Discovery of La Pérouse wrecks ==
In 1826, Dillon had command of the St. Patrick and was attempting to get to Fiji when he happened upon Tikopia, one of the Santa Cruz Islands. There he found many of the inhabitants in possession of items of European manufacture such as sword guards, teacups, knives, and glass beads. He learned from the Tikopians that the items had come from two ships wrecked some years before on the neighbouring island of Vanikoro.

Dillon was convinced he had happened on the wreckage of Boussole and Astrolabe, the two French frigates of the La Pérouse expedition. The ships had disappeared in the Pacific after calling at Botany Bay in 1788, and their fate had been a mystery for nearly 40 years.

Dillon sailed to Calcutta to report his discovery and garner support for an exploration of Vanikoro. The British government in India of Lord Amherst commissioned him and gave him command of the British East India Company's survey vessel Research. In January 1827 Dillon sailed for Vanikoro. After a long and difficult journey he reached Vanikoro in September 1827. While there he recovered items from the wrecks, including a ship's bell of French make.

He also tried to learn more about the fate of the French explorers from the older inhabitants of the island. According to Dillon's account in his Narrative and Successful Result, he learned that both ships had been wrecked on the reefs during a storm, that some of the survivors had built a boat from the wreckage and sailed off in it, and that two survivors had remained on the island but had since died.

Dillon eventually made his way to France, where he met Barthélemy de Lesseps, the only living survivor of the La Pérouse expedition. De Lesseps had served the expedition as a Russian interpreter; he had left the expedition in Petropavlovsk, Siberia and made his way overland back to Europe. He identified the items brought back by Dillon as items that had been carried on the French ships.

In 1829, Dillon published his Narrative and Successful Result. He also received a knighthood and pension from the French government. Much of the remainder of his life was spent in a disappointing search for greater recognition for his achievements. Although generally not recalled, he was one of the character witnesses called by Sir Fitzroy Kelly in the defence of John Tawell for the poison murder of Sarah Hart in March 1845. By all accounts a passionate and complex individual, Peter Dillon by turns charmed and alienated the people he encountered. He died in Paris on 9 February 1847.

== Modern criticisms ==
Gananath Obeyesekere, a Sri Lankan professor at Princeton, in 2005 attempted a "radical reexamination of the notion of cannibalism" and deconstruction, particularly as it pertains to "Western eyewitness accounts, carefully examining their origins and treating them as a species of fiction writing and seamen's yarns."
