= Sparta, Ossining =

Neighborhood of Ossining, New York, US

Coordinates: 41°08′41″N 073°51′48″W

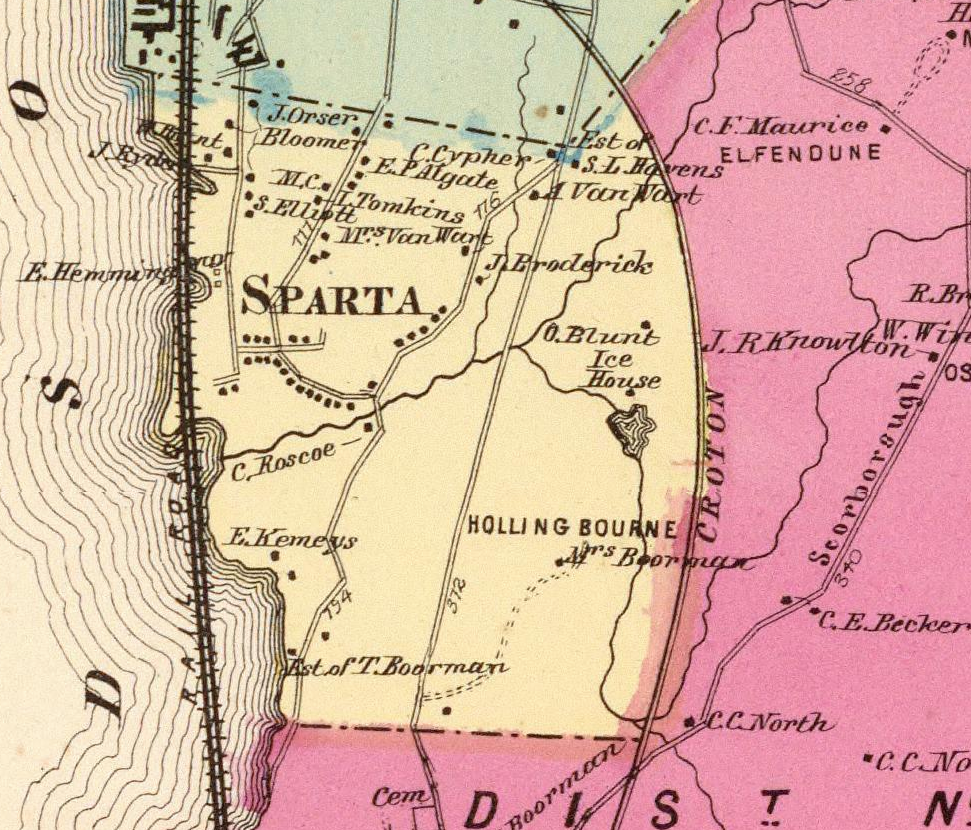
Sparta in 1868 before incorporation within Ossining village

Sparta is a neighborhood of the village of Ossining in Westchester County, New York, United States. Sparta borders the Hudson River, south of most of the village of Ossining. The neighborhood was a hamlet of the town of Ossining, and remains its oldest community. Sparta was founded by Dutch settlers in the 17th century. It has zip codes 10510 and 10562. The elevation is 56 feet.

The neighborhood includes the Sparta Historic District, the Jug Tavern, and the Sparta Cemetery. The New Croton Aqueduct, Old Croton Aqueduct, Old Croton Trailway State Park, and Trailways State Park Aqueduct transverse the neighborhood.

1 Rockledge Avenue, built c. 1784 by Josiah Rhodes and one of the oldest remaining houses in Sparta

About a mile south of the village green is the Sparta Mine, a silver and lead mine that was worked prior to the Revolutionary War.

1 Rockledge Avenue is one of the oldest existing houses in Sparta, and was built circa 1784 by Philip Van Cortlandt, its first resident was Josiah Rhodes, a man who operated a mustard mill on Sparta Brook with William Kemeys. The property was alleged to be one of George Washington's headquarters during the Revolutionary War. Frank A. Vanderlip expanded and renovated the house in 1921 and added two new wings. He also bought about 70 nearby homes and business buildings. He tore down dilapidated structures, turned some to face the river, and moved at least one house to a new location.

14 Rockledge Avenue, known today as Captain's Cottage, was the home of Captain Lewis Brady and his family for over 50 years, beginning in 1805. Brady was born into slavery at George Washington's Mount Vernon plantation, escaped to freedom, and eventually became a respected local businessman and fisherman in Ossining. Captain Brady lived to the age of 108, making him the oldest person buried in the historic Sparta Cemetery. The house is part of the African American Heritage Trail of Westchester County.
