= Jug Tavern =

Historic house in New York, United States

- U.S. National Register of Historic Places
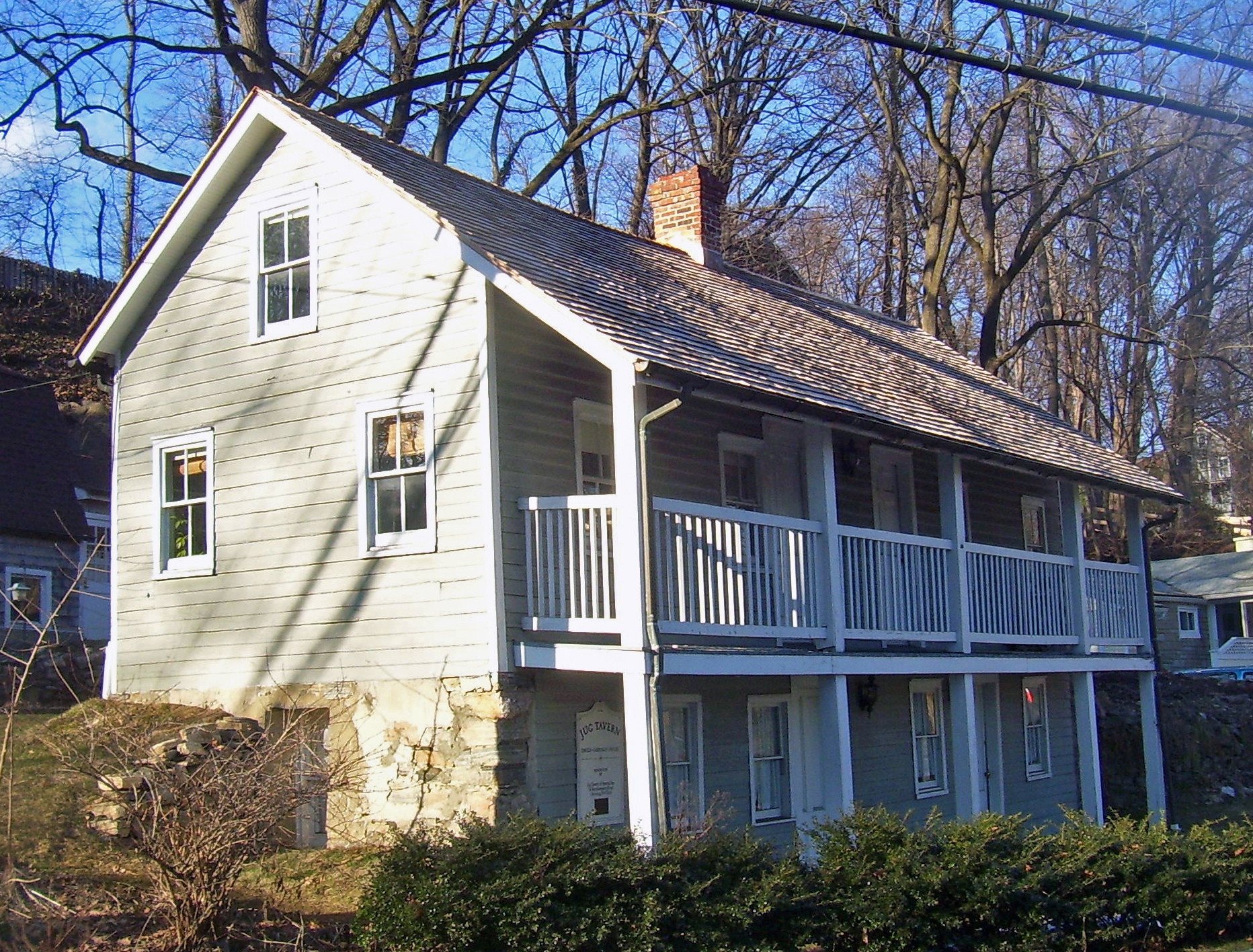
- South profile and east elevation, 2009

- Location within New York Location within the United States
- Location: Ossining, NY
- Nearest city: White Plains
- Coordinates: 41°8′41″N 73°51′49″W
- Built: c. 1760
- NRHP reference No.: 76001293
- Added to NRHP: June 7, 1976

The Jug Tavern, also known as the Davids–Garrison House or the Grapevine Inn, is located at the junction of Revolutionary Road and Rockledge Avenue in Sparta section of Ossining, New York, United States. It is a wood frame building, the oldest elements of which date to the mid-18th century, before the American Revolution, making it possibly the oldest structure in the village. It has, however, been expanded and modified since then, and was almost completely rebuilt in the late 19th century. In 1976 it was listed on the National Register of Historic Places.

Originally it was located along the Albany Post Road, the central building in the small hamlet of Sparta, a name still used for the neighborhood later absorbed into the village of Ossining and retaining many other intact historic buildings. Much of the house's history is unclear, including whether it was ever even a tavern. Some local legends hold that Revolutionary War figures such as George Washington and John André visited. The name "Jug Tavern" was not even known to have been used for the property until the mid-20th century. A local organization dedicated to preserving the building currently owns the property.

== Building ==
The tavern is located on the northwest corner of the intersection, 600 feet (180 m) west of Albany Post Road (U.S. Route 9) and 1,000 feet (300 m) east of the Hudson River. On the east are large modern commercial buildings and parking lots; to the west are the other residential buildings of Sparta, amid mature trees. Sparta Brook, a small tributary of the Hudson that takes its name from the settlement, is just to the east. The land slopes up slightly toward the north and northwest as a result.

The six-by-two-bay building is built into that rise, with its stone foundation exposed on the east to give it the appearance of two and a half stories. The basement's east face, like the upper stories, is sided in clapboard. It is topped with a side-gabled, shingled roof from which one brick chimney rises. On the northwest corner of the second story is an addition that gives the north facade an extra bay.

Along the full length of the second story is a balustrade veranda that serves as a porch for the ground floor. It is supported by five square wooden pillars that rise to the overhanging eaves. Both stories have full fenestration with two-over-two double-hung sash windows and two entrances flanking the center, with those on the second story closer together and having no intervening window. Similar windows are on the other three elevations and in the gable fields. Additional entrances are located at the south basement and the north addition.

Inside all the finishes are modern. Most date to the late 19th century at the earliest. The only remnant of the original building is in the structural system, where later renovations replaced some, but not most, of the original mortise and tenon framing with balloon framing more common at the time the renovations were likely done.

== History ==
Early 18th-century records suggest that the land where the tavern now stands, then owned by the Philipse family, was leased by a Charles Davids (or Davis, in some documents), a tenant farmer. The Albany Post Road was built through the area in 1723, and by 1744 a bridge crossed the brook. The area was a natural crossroads, and Davids built a farmhouse from which at least the foundation and framing survive between 1758 and 1760.

Incomplete later records suggest that his sons inherited various portions of the leasehold, though it is not known which. By the 1780s, the latest period suggested for the house's construction, a road ran down to the river from the site and the future hamlet of Sparta was coming into being. In 1784 the Philipse land was confiscated by the state as a consequence of Frederick Philipse's support for the British during the recent Revolutionary War. The following year it was offered for sale, and Peter Davids bought the 200 acres (81 ha) that comprise not only the tavern site but present-day Sparta. Maps from this time show a building, but not at the exact site.

Four years later, Davids took out a mortgage covering 70 of those acres (28 ha) to cover debts he had owed a New York City man since 1772. In 1794 he defaulted, and signed it over to James Drowley, who laid out a plan for Sparta but died in 1795. A survey map from that year of the plan is the first known to show a building at the current site. Davids died that year also, and his widow may have lived there at the time.

By 1814 the house had become the property of Nathaniel and Annis Garrison. That year they transferred it to a Samuel and Tallman Garrison, possibly Nathaniel's brothers. In turn, Tallman Garrison's 1817 will bequeathed his half of the property to his brother William. Nathaniel and Annis apparently continued living there. Sparta changed soon after when the Post Road was rerouted away from the house to the current alignment of Route 9. This benefited Sing Sing (as Ossining was then known) to the north as a local port for river shipping, since its Main Street was still a convenient route to its docks, which also charged a lower fee. Sparta began to decline as a commercial center, to the point that when then Hudson River Railroad was built two decades later, no station was built to serve it.

Nathaniel Garrison died in 1843. His wife at some point regained the property, since records show that she paid the property taxes on it during the 1860s, possibly with proceeds from a very small shop local lore says she ran in the house and boarders they took in. At some time during the Garrisons' ownership of the house, its size was doubled and the veranda added. Sparta further changed two years after Nathaniel Garrison's death, when, in 1845, it became part of the Town of Ossining, newly created from the Town of Mount Pleasant.

The likelihood that Nathaniel and Annis Garrison regained ownership sometime during the early 19th century also finds support in their grandsons' sale of the house to Michael Geisler in 1882. He spent much of the next year rebuilding it almost as it was. A contemporary painting, presumed to show the house as it was before this work, depicts it almost as it is now save for having two chimneys and showing signs of neglect, with gaps in its eaves showing its rafters.

This might have led Geisler to restore the house, but that is not known for sure. It is also possible that it was damaged by fire, as a contemporary newspaper account reports that Geisler's home in Sparta was burned. It is not clear whether the article is referring to the tavern itself though since Geisler owned more than one property in the hamlet, and an account of the tavern's demolition in the same newspaper a week later makes no mention of a fire. (Note: In the late 1970s, two architectural specialists who inspected the framing and fabric of the building found no evidence of fire; however, they were also not aware that one had supposedly occurred.) It also reports that much of the original timber framing was in good condition, so it may likely have been reused either in the rebuilt house or the new house Geisler was building nearby.

In 1901 the village of Sing Sing formally changed its name to Ossining, in order to distinguish itself from Sing Sing Prison. Five years later, Sparta itself voted to be annexed by the prosperous village, which they had increasingly come to feel part of. It was an increasingly declining part, with high crime and deteriorating buildings. That ended in 1919 when Frank A. Vanderlip, president of National City Bank, and his wife, residents of Scarborough to the south, began redeveloping the hamlet. They bought many of the old houses and restored them into middle-class housing.

The Jug Tavern, already renovated by the Geislers, was not among Vanderlip's restorations. However, it may have figured in Vanderlip's efforts, as many of the houses were being renovated in the Colonial Revival mode, and it was the only building in Sparta that actually dated to that period. The Vanderlip efforts, which continued past his death until the last restored house was sold in the 1970s, led to much local newspaper coverage and an interest in the history of the area. It is during that period that much of the lore about the Tavern—that various Revolutionary figures such as George Washington or John André had stopped in for a drink, or that British prisoners of war were held in the cellar—may have surfaced and become accepted as, or confused with, fact.

Geisler's descendants owned and lived in the house until 1974, when it was sold to the town. The village designated Sparta a local historic district the following year. Restoration efforts began, and it was listed on the Register in 1976. In 1986, the property was turned over to its present owner, Jug Tavern of Sparta Inc., a non-profit organization that preserves it. Restoration was completed in 1991.

== Name and use ==
There is uncertainty over whether the house was ever used as a tavern, and if it was, whether it was called the Jug Tavern. No clear record of a liquor license being granted to the property exists. In 1795, a man named William Hall was granted a license to operate a tavern in Sparta, the first record of that name being used for the community, but the tavern's location is not specified. Some local lore holds that liquor was served illegally, without charge, to those who could be trusted to keep that knowledge to themselves, and hence no license would have been sought, much less recorded.

That belief also holds that liquor sales were illegal when made by the jug rather than the glass, hence the name. "Jug Tavern" does not appear in any document related to the building until 1947, and reportedly the Geisler descendants who lived there as it began to catch on were offended by it. Almost 30 years later, Frank Vanderlip's son told the authors of a walking tour guidebook that he had never heard the name in his lifetime of developing the area. To him it had always been known as the "Grapevine Inn", due to the decorations around the front door. An 1895 photograph appears to show them.

== See also ==
- National Register of Historic Places listings in northern Westchester County, New York
