= Mark Sadan =

American photographer and filmmaker

Mark Sadan is an American photographer, film maker and visual artist.

== Career ==
Mark Sadan began his work in art as an actor in his early twenties graduating from the American Academy of Dramatic Arts in New York City.

As an experimental filmmaker, he received two special screenings of his films in cine-probes at the Museum of Modern Art in New York City. Later, he was awarded a full scholarship to study at the Graduate Film and Television Institute of New York University. He produced short films for Sesame Street, and NBC television. After directing a documentary in Norway, Sadan was invited to exhibit at the Preus Foto Museum and later decided to pursuit a career as photographer. This led to an exhibit on Norway at the World Trade Center in 1983.

Sadan has given workshops in the US and abroad. He has exhibited in Eastern Europe, Scandinavia, North America and the United Kingdom. His work has been featured in photo magazines such as La Photographica from Spain, Zoom from Italy, Iris from Brazil, Nippon and Asahi from Japan, SchwarzWeiss (Black & White) from Germany, and Foto-Forum from Norway. In the United States, American Photo, Popular Photography, Dance Magazine and The New York Times published Sadan's photos. His work is also found in private and museum collections. He's also had solo exhibitions at the Julia Margaret Cameron Museum on the Isle of Wight, the National Museum of Dance in the U.S., the Museum of New Art in Estonia, and the Preus National Photo Art Museum in Norway.

== Personal life ==
Sadan was raised in Arizona, moving to Israel as a teenager to reconnect with his Jewish heritage. While traveling, Sadan was inspired by a film festival and decided to study acting in New York City. After graduating, he returned to Israel where he met Abu'l-Qásim Faizí, a prominent Bahá’í educator who introduced him to the religion. Sadan's interest in Bahá’í took him to Tehran, Iran for three months before moving back to New York City and officially joining the faith.

== Sex Offender Registry ==
In June 2014, Sadan's friend reported that Sadan had sexually assaulted his two daughters at ages 10 or 11 "about 30 times" over the course of seven years, having read their account in one of their senior memoirs.

Sadan was charged with two counts of aggravated sexual assault of a minor in 2015, by Vermont authorities. A warrant had been issued for Sadan's arrest in Montpelier, Vermont on December 8, 2014, accusing Sadan of sexually assaulting two minors over several years. The Montpelier Police Department contacted the U.S. Marshals seeking assistance in locating Sadan, who lived in Ossining, New York at the time. He was arrested 11 days later in Bradenton, Florida, where U.S. Marshals believe Sadan fled as a result of the arrest warrant.

On April 19, 2016, Sadan was convicted of three felony counts of lewd and lascivious conduct with a child. He was sentenced to serve 4 to 12 years; all of which were suspended, with credit for two years of time served. Sadan was released December, 2016 and placed on probation as a registered sex offender.
