= Ralph Ingersoll Lockwood =

American novelist (1798–1858)

- Born: 1798; New York City, U.S.
- Died: 1858 (aged 59–60); New York City, U.S.
- Occupations: Writer; lawyer; novelist
- Relatives: Ingersoll Lockwood (nephew)
- Writing career
- Pen name: Mr. Smith

Ralph Ingersoll Lockwood (1798 Greenwich – 1858 New York City) was an American political writer, lawyer and novelist. Lockwood was one of 136 signatories to an 1838 petition to Congress on the matter of copyright and intellectual property. He also wrote under the pseudonym "Mr. Smith". Lockwood's nephew, Ingersoll Lockwood, was a lawyer and writer.

== Bibliography ==
=== Novels ===
- The Insurgents. Philadelphia: Carey, Lea and Blanchard (1835)
- Rosine Laval

=== Political writings ===
- An Address to the Republicans and People of New-York, Pennsylvania and Virginia, Upon the State of Presidential Parties

=== Legal works ===
- An analytical and practical synopsis of all the cases argued and reversed in law and equity : in the Court for the Correction of Errors of the state of New York, from 1799 to 1847 : with the names of the cases and a table of the titles, &c
- Essay on a national bankrupt law
- A treatise on the law of husband and wife : as respects property : partly founded upon Roper's treatise, and comprising Jacob's notes and additions thereto, with John Edward Bright, Edward Jacob and R S Donnison Roper
