= Ingersoll Lockwood =

American novelist (1841–1918)

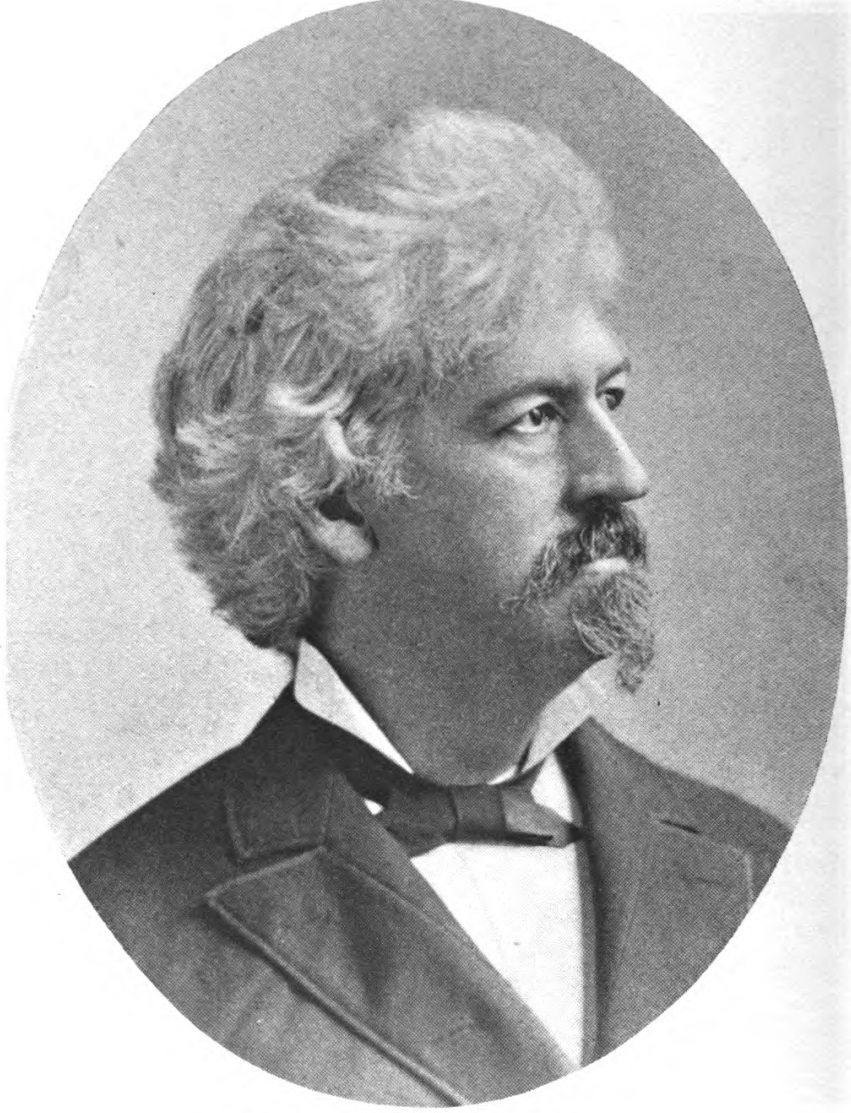
- Born: August 2, 1841; Ossining, Atwater, U.S.
- Died: September 30, 1918 (aged 77); Saratoga Springs, New York, U.S.
- Occupations: Lawyer; writer
- Relatives: Ralph Ingersoll Lockwood (uncle)

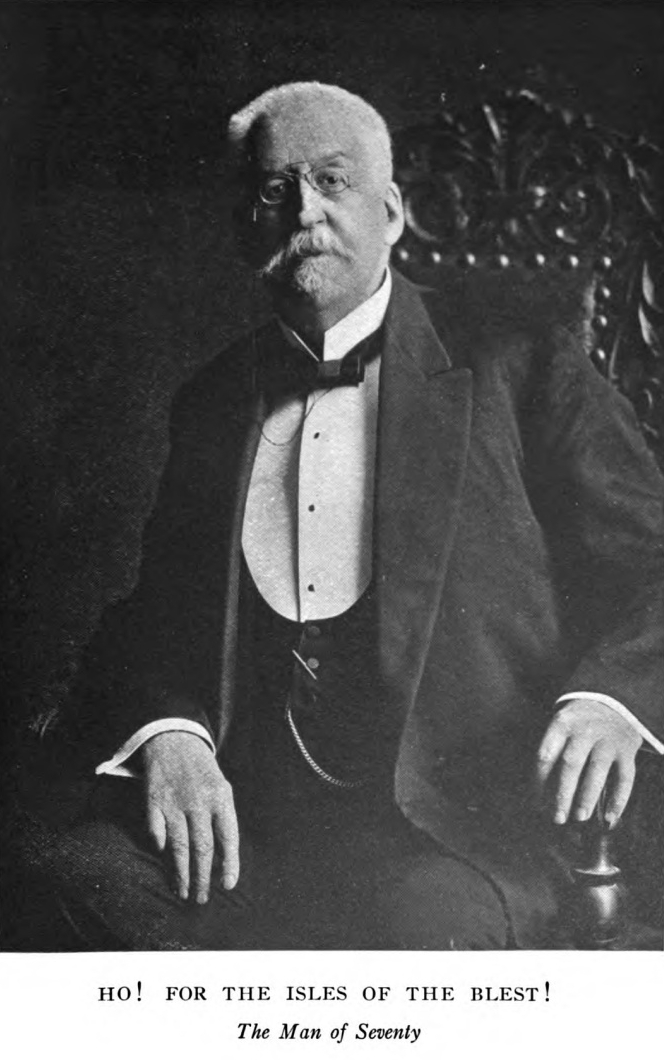
Ingersoll Lockwood, at the age of 70

Ingersoll Lockwood (August 2, 1841 – September 30, 1918) was an American lawyer, diplomat and writer. He wrote children's novels, including the Baron Trump novels (1889/93), as well as the dystopian novel, 1900: or; The Last President, a play, and several non-fiction works. He wrote some of his non-fiction under the pseudonym Irwin Longman.

== Early life and career ==
Lockwood was born in Ossining, New York, the son of Munson Ingersoll and Sarah Lewis (née Smith) Lockwood. Munson Lockwood, like his two older brothers, Ralph and Albert, was a lawyer and intimate friend of Henry Clay. However, Munson primarily achieved prominence during his military service and civic activism. He was a general in the New York State Militia and commandant of its 7th Brigade. In New York, Munson actively raised funds for the Hungarian statesman and freedom fighter Lajos Kossuth, whom he greatly admired. He was also one of the founders of Ossining's first bank and Dale Cemetery and served as the Warden of Sing Sing prison from 1850 to 1855. Lockwood had two brothers, Henry Clay Lockwood and Howard Lockwood.

Like his father and uncles, Ingersoll Lockwood trained as a lawyer, although his first position was as a diplomat. In 1862, he was appointed Consul to the Kingdom of Hanover by Abraham Lincoln. At the time, he was the youngest member of the U.S. consular force and served in that post for four years. On his return, he established a legal practice in New York City with his older brother Henry.

By the 1880s, Lockwood had established a parallel career as a lecturer and writer. He wrote and published two children's novels featuring a character named Baron Trump in 1889 and 1893 respectively. In 1896, he published 1900: or; The Last President, in which a populist candidate brings on the downfall of the United States after winning the 1896 presidential election.

== Personal life ==
In 1884, he married Winifred Wallace Tinker, a graduate of Vassar College and aspiring author. They were divorced in 1892. That same year, she married Edward R. Johnes, a lawyer by profession and a literateur by avocation. (Note: Edward Rodolph Johnes (1852–1903) specialised in corporate and business law. He wrote a number of pamphlets on legal issues and also published a book of poetry, Briefs by a Barrister, in 1879. After their marriage, Winifred Tinker Johnes published several short stories and two novels, Miss Gwynne, Bachelor (1894) and Memoirs of a Little Girl (1896).) He was described in Current Literature as Winifred's "kind and most sympathetic literary advisor."

== Later years and death ==
Lockwood spent his retirement years as a recluse in Saratoga Springs, New York where he published his last book, a collection of poetry entitled In Varying Mood, or, Jetsam, Flotsam and Ligan in 1912. It opens with juxtaposed photographs of Lockwood at age 35 and at age 70. In the preface, he wrote:

The end has almost come. I'm only waiting for the signal to push off and begin my voyage to the Isles of the Blest in the far Western Seas. I was troubled in my mind at first, for my little bark, staunch though it may be, sat too deep in the water. It was overladen with conceits that wouldn't be current and merchandise that wouldn't be saleable in the Isles of the Blest. Overboard with it! Now that I have lightened ship I feel better.

Lockwood died in Saratoga Springs five years later, in 1918, at the age of 77. He had no children or surviving relatives.
