= Ossining, New York =

- Town
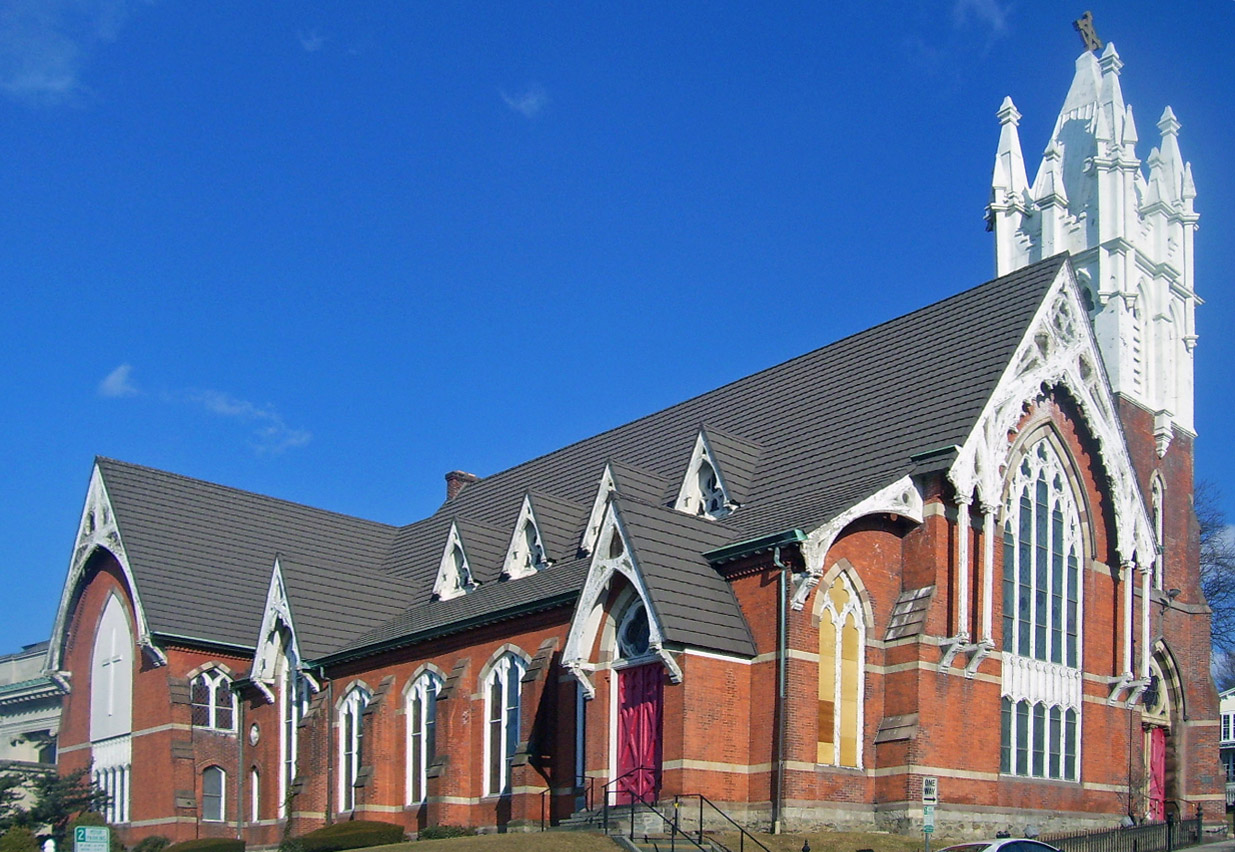
- First Baptist Church of Ossining

- Flag
- Nickname: The Volunteer-Spirited Town
- Location of Ossining (town), New York
- Coordinates: 41°9′45.47″N 73°51′41.75″W
- Country: United States
- State: New York
- County: Westchester

Government
  - Type: Manager-Council
  - Town Supervisor: Elizabeth Feldman (D)

Area
  - Total: 15.74 sq mi (40.76 km^{2})
  - Land: 11.58 sq mi (29.99 km^{2})
  - Water: 4.16 sq mi (10.77 km^{2})

Population (2020)
  - Total: 40,061
  - Density: 3,459.49/sq mi (1,335.72/km^{2})
  - Demonym: Ossinaut
- Time zone: UTC−5 (Eastern (EST))
  - Summer (DST): UTC−4 (EDT)
- ZIP Code: 10562
- Area code: 914
- FIPS code: 36-55530
- GNIS feature ID: 0959520
- Website: Official website

Ossining (/ˈɒsɪnɪŋ/ OSS-in-ing) is a town located along the Hudson River in Westchester County, New York. The population was 40,061 at the time of the 2020 census. It contains two villages, the Village of Ossining and part of Briarcliff Manor, the rest of which is located in the Town of Mount Pleasant. Ossining is the location of Sing Sing maximum-security prison.

== Geography ==
According to the United States Census Bureau, the town has a total area of 15.7 square miles (41 km^{2}), of which 11.6 square miles (30 km^{2}) is land and 4.2 square miles (11 km^{2}) (26.43%) is water.

Ossining is bounded on the west by the Hudson River and on the north by the Croton River.

== History ==
In 1685, Frederick Philipse bought the area which presently constitutes the Town of Ossining from the Sint Sinck, a Munsee-speaking Lenape people. His Manor extended from Spuyten Duyvil Creek on the border between present-day Manhattan and the Bronx to the Croton River. The last Lord of the Manor, Frederick Philipse III, was a Loyalist in the American Revolutionary War who fled to England. The State of New York confiscated the manor in 1779.

In 1813, the village of Sing Sing was incorporated. Sing Sing Prison, now known as Sing Sing Correctional Facility, which is a maximum-security prison, opened in 1826. The prison was opened to replace the Newgate Prison, located in New York City. In 1845, the New York State Legislature created a new town out of the northern part of what had been the Town of Mount Pleasant. A local Indian authority suggested the town be named Ossinsing, a different form of the name Sing Sing. One year later the last "s" was removed for ease in pronunciation. In 1901, to prevent confusion of goods made in the village with Sing Sing prison-made items, local officials had the village name changed to Ossining as well.

In 1902 an area southeast of the village of Ossining, then known as Whitson's Corners, was incorporated as the village of Briarcliff Manor.

The Jug Tavern and Scarborough Historic District are listed on the National Register of Historic Places.

A plaque on the Hudson Hills Golf Course on Croton Dam Road commemorates its pre-WWII history as the Rising Sun Golf & Country Club, the first black-owned and operated golf course in the Tri-State area. It is now one of the stops on the African American Heritage Trail of Westchester County.

== Demographics ==
Historical population
Census	Pop.	Note	%±
1850	4,939		—
1860	6,766		37.0%
1870	7,798		15.3%
1880	8,760		12.3%
1890	10,058		14.8%
1900	10,895		8.3%
1910	12,828		17.7%
1920	12,358		−3.7%
1930	17,724		43.4%
1940	18,911		6.7%
1950	20,137		6.5%
1960	26,199		30.1%
1970	32,397		23.7%
1980	30,680		−5.3%
1990	34,124		11.2%
2000	36,534		7.1%
2010	37,674		3.1%
2020	40,061		6.3%
U.S. Decennial Census

In the census of 2000, there were 36,534 people, 12,355 households, and 8,537 families residing in the town. The population density was 3,123.0 inhabitants per square mile (1,205.8/km^{2}). There were 12,733 housing units at an average density of 1,088.4 units per square mile (420.2 units/km^{2}). The racial makeup of the town was 70.26% White, 14.28% Black or African American, 0.35% Native American, 4.54% Asian, 0.02% Pacific Islander, 7.34% from other races, and 3.21% from two or more races. Hispanic or Latino of any race were 19.93% of the population.

There were 12,355 households, out of which 33.1% had children under the age of 18 living with them, 54.4% were married couples living together, 10.7% had a female householder with no husband present, and 30.9% were non-families. Of all households 25.5% were made up of individuals, and 9.0% had someone living alone who was 65 years of age or older. The average household size was 2.64 and the average family size was 3.14.

In the town, 21.8% of the population was under the age of 18, 7.8% from 18 to 24, 34.5% from 25 to 44, 22.9% from 45 to 64, and 13.0% was 65 years of age or older. The median age was 37 years. For every 100 females, there were 106.1 males. For every 100 females age 18 and over, there were 105.4 males.

The median income for a household in the town was $65,485, and the median income for a family was $81,943 (these figures had risen to $77,753 and $98,593 respectively as of a 2007 estimate). Males had a median income of $51,286 versus $40,618 for females. The per capita income for the town was $34,195. About 5.0% of families and 8.4% of the population were below the poverty line, including 8.3% of those under age 18 and 9.2% of those age 65 or over.

== Government ==
The Town of Ossining is governed by a town supervisor and a four-member town board. It comprises two incorporated villages, Village of Ossining and Village of Briarcliff Manor, each of which has a mayor and a village board. Each village maintains its own police department and village justice court. In addition to the two incorporated villages, there is an unincorporated section of the town that is not part of either village. The unincorporated section of the town has its own highway department. Fire, EMS and water services are provided by either the Village of Ossining or the Village of Briarcliff Manor. Law enforcement services for the unincorporated section of the town are provided through an inter-municipal agreement with the Village of Ossining Police Department (the town's police department was disbanded in 2011).

== Education ==
Ossining Union Free School District operates public schools, including Ossining High School, Anne M. Dorner Middle School, Roosevelt Elementary School, Claremont Elementary School, Brookside Elementary School, and Park Elementary School.

The Ossining Public Library, originally chartered in 1893 as the Sing Sing Public Library, serves the residents of the Village and Town of Ossining, and of the Ossining School District. The current library collections include 110,000 books, 25,000 non-print items, and 300 newspaper and magazine titles. As a charter member of the 38-member Westchester Library System, the Ossining Public Library offers its patrons access to the more than one million holdings of the other county libraries. A $15.8-million building program was started in 2005 to replace the 1960s-era facility with a new 48,000-square-foot (4,500 m^{2}) building. The new Ossining Public Library opened in March 2007 and added many new or enhanced services, including over 50 public Internet terminals, a 250-seat theater, an art gallery, and the county's first radio frequency (RFID) circulation system.

== Notable people ==
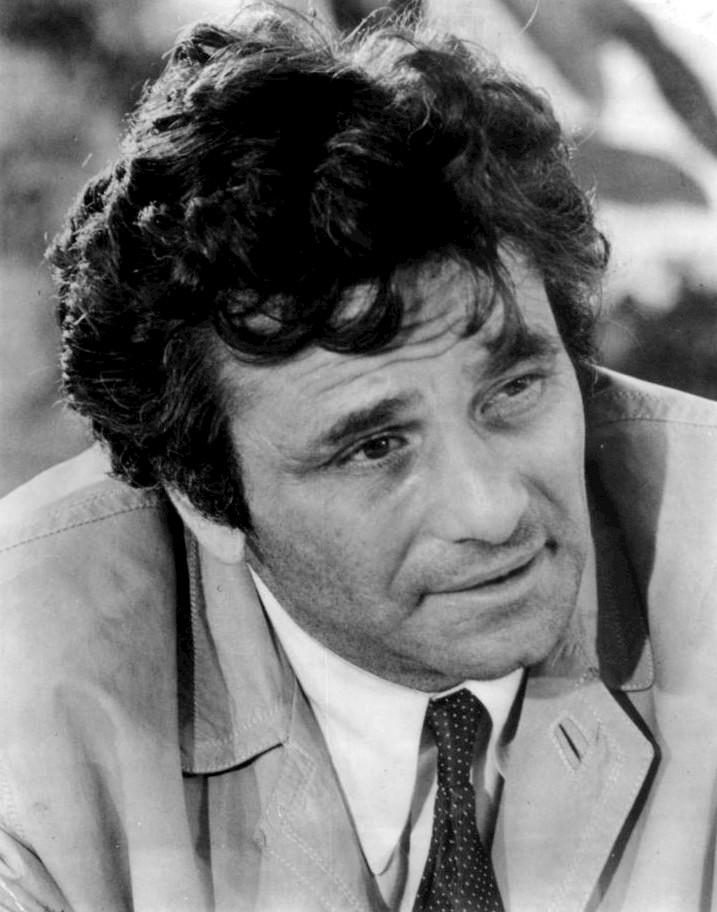
Peter Falk

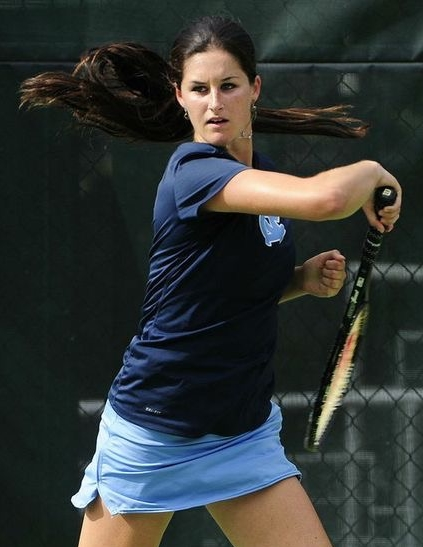
Jamie Loeb

- David T. Abercrombie, co-founder of Abercrombie & Fitch
- George Borup, Arctic explorer
- Jason Robert Brown, musical theatre composer, lyricist, and playwright
- Northern Calloway, actor, David on Sesame Street
- John Cheever (1912–1982), author
- John Chervokas, advertising executive
- Jennifer Cihi, singer (Broadway/television)
- Ted Daniel, jazz trumpeter and composer
- Kara DioGuardi, singer-songwriter
- Meredith Dixon, member of the New Mexico House of Representatives
- Peter Falk (1927–2011), actor
- Albert Fish, serial killer and rapist
- Mike da Fonte, professional soccer player
- Anne Francis, actress
- Khalid Khannouchi (born 1971), American record holder for the marathon
- Erica Leerhsen (born 1976), actress
- Ingersoll Lockwood (1841–1918), lawyer and writer, author of the Baron Trump novels
- Jamie Loeb (born 1995), tennis player
- Fonda Rae, R&B singer
- Igby Rigney, actor
- Sonny Sharrock, jazz guitarist
- Jesse Lee Soffer, actor
- Matt Striker, WWE interviewer and commentator
- Jacob Toppin (born 2000), basketball forward in the Israeli Basketball Premier League, formerly in the NBA.

== In popular culture ==
Don Draper, the primary protagonist of Mad Men, lives with his family in Ossining.

== Gallery ==
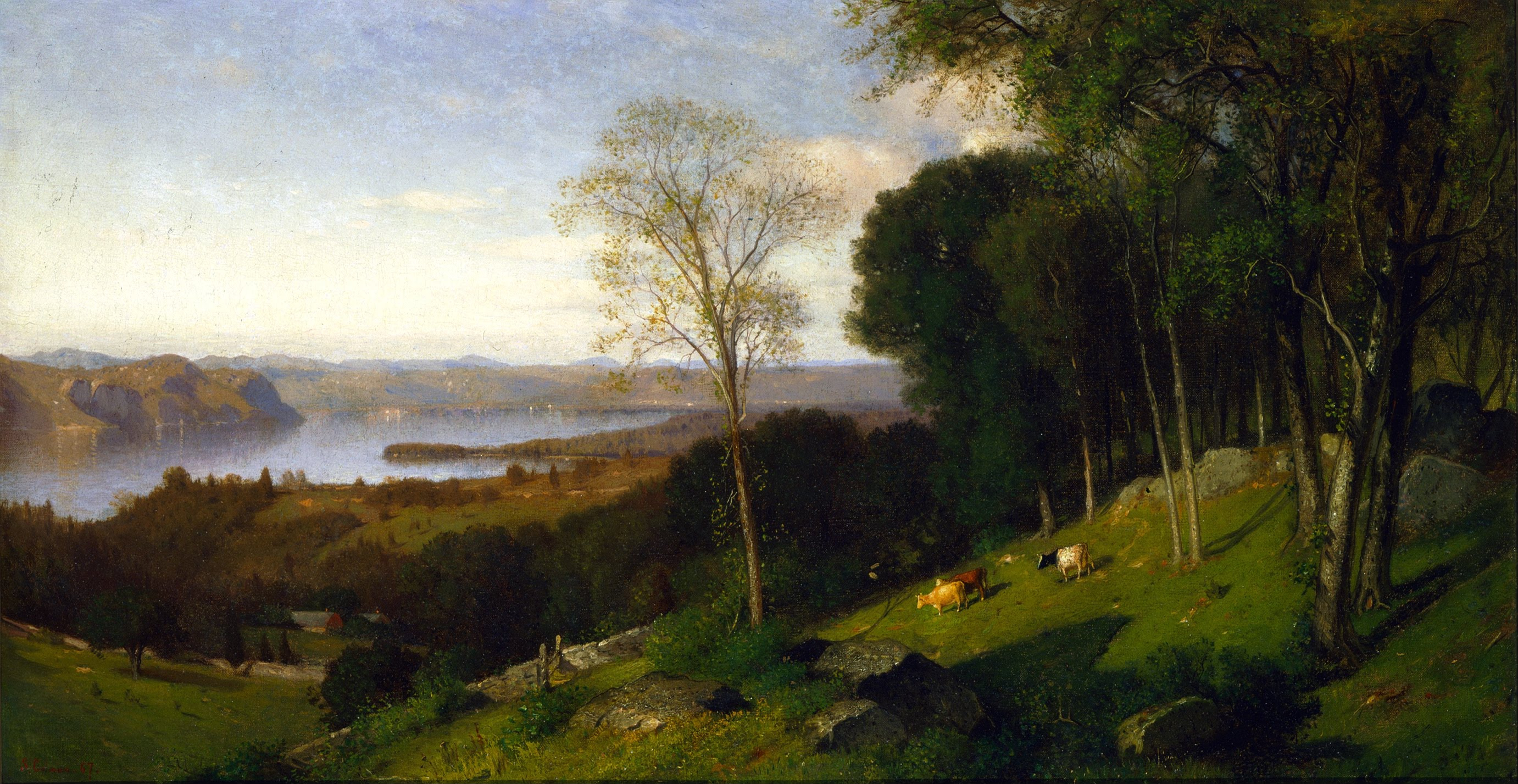
Painting by Samuel Colman of the view looking north from Ossining (1867)

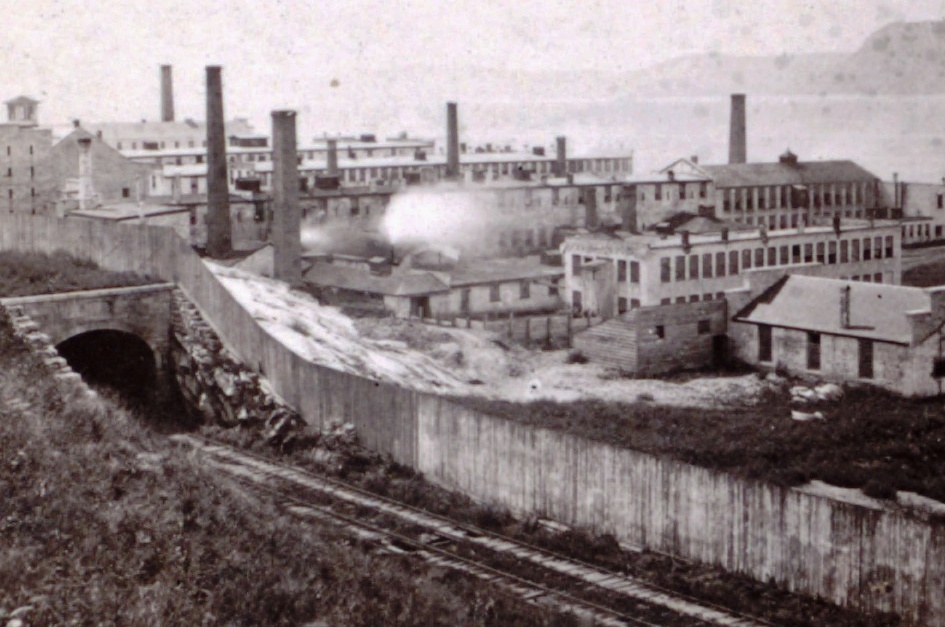
A photograph of Sing Sing Prison from about the same time (c.1863-1885)

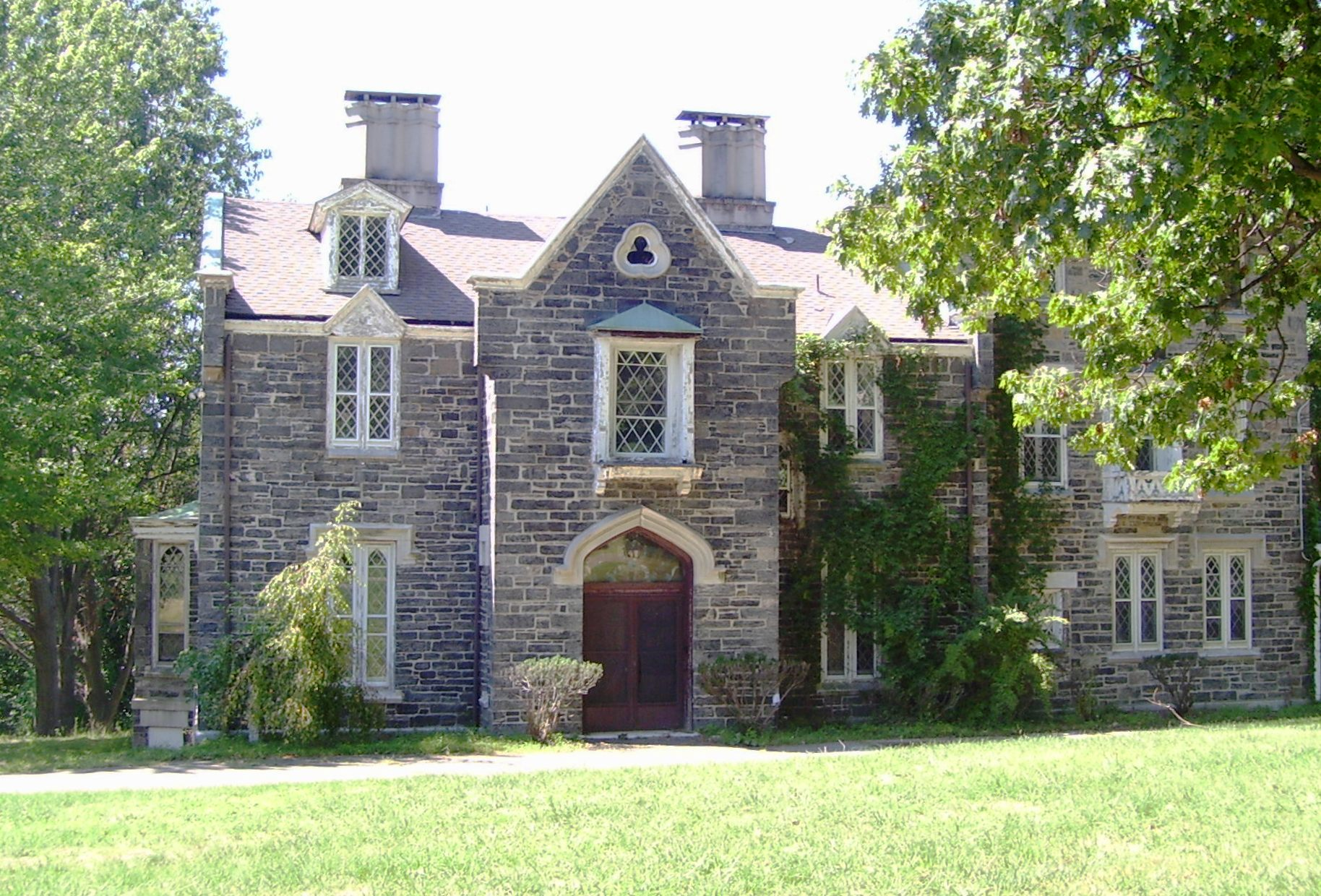
Like most of the river towns along the Hudson in the middle- to late-19th century, Ossining was the location of the mansions and estates of the rich. The Kane Mansion was built in 1843....

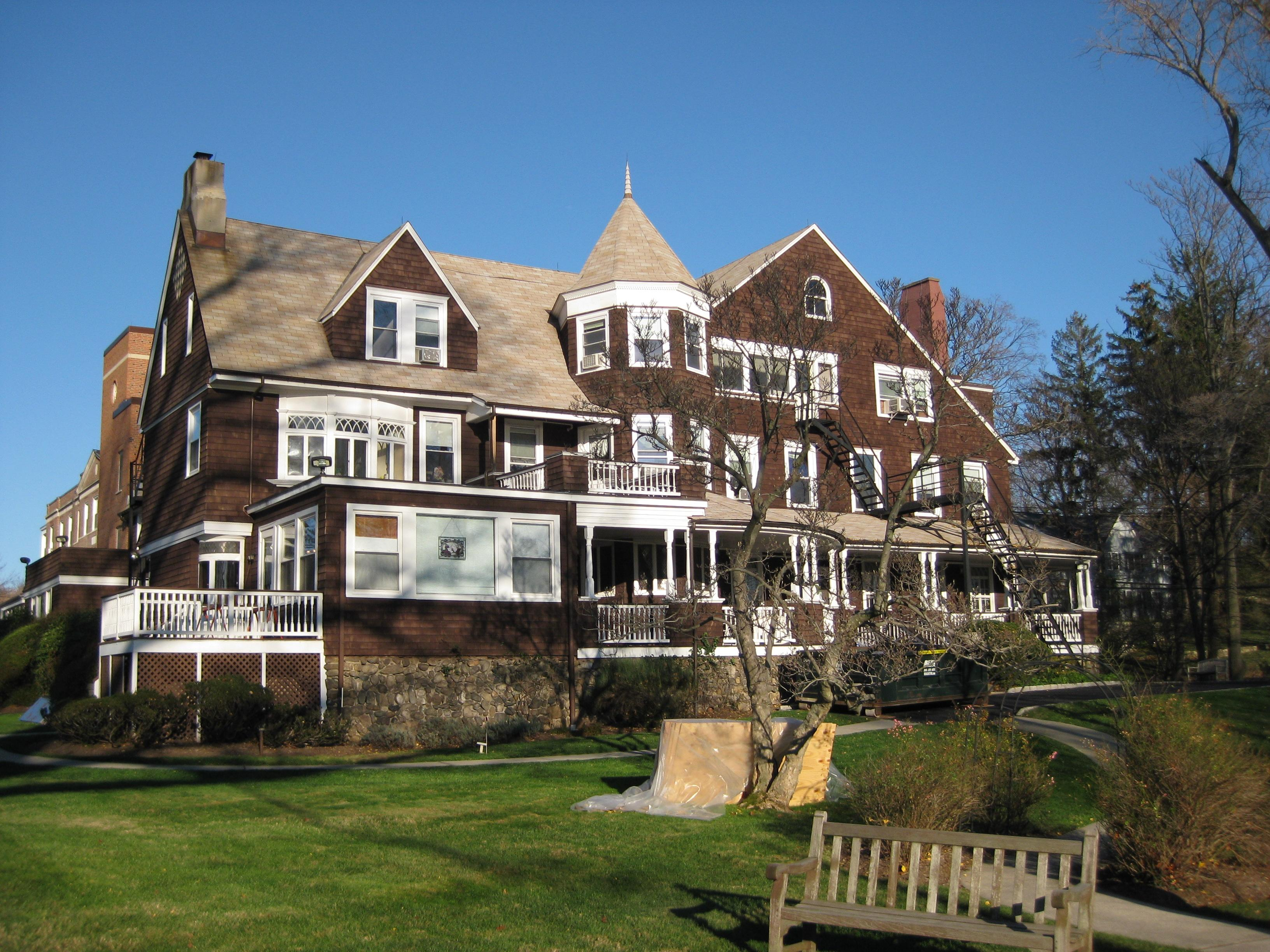
...while "Hillside", the house of General Edwin McAlpin, was built prior to 1895

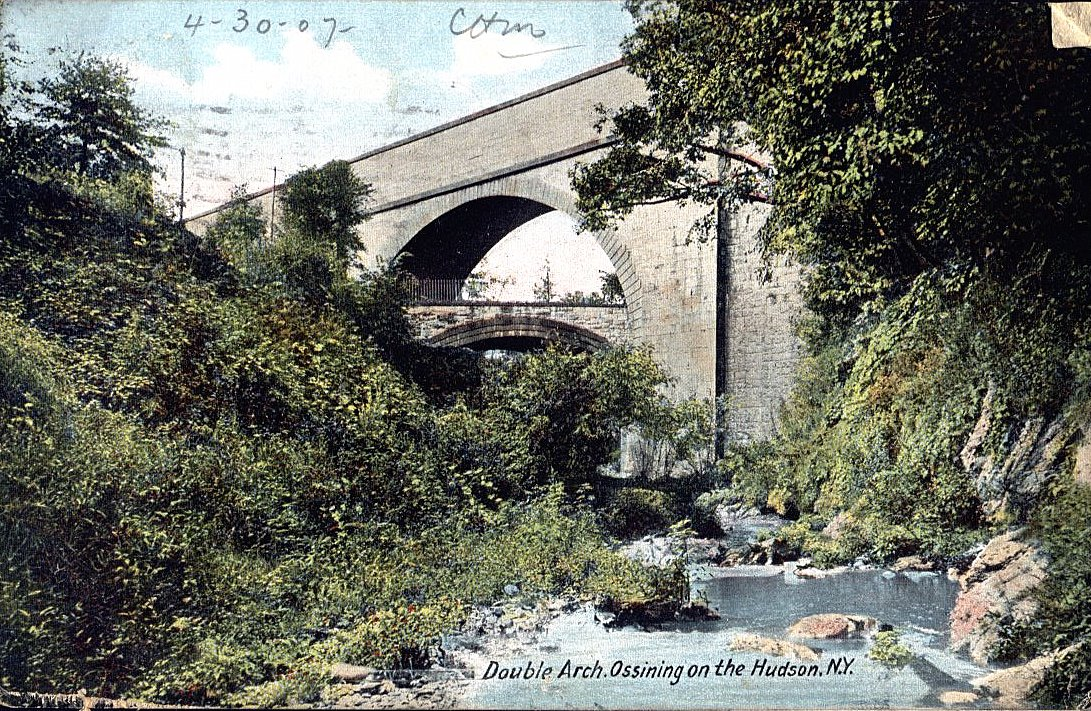
Two arched bridges cross Sing Sing Kill in Ossining. Broadway is carried on the lower bridge, while the Croton Aqueduct was carried on the upper one

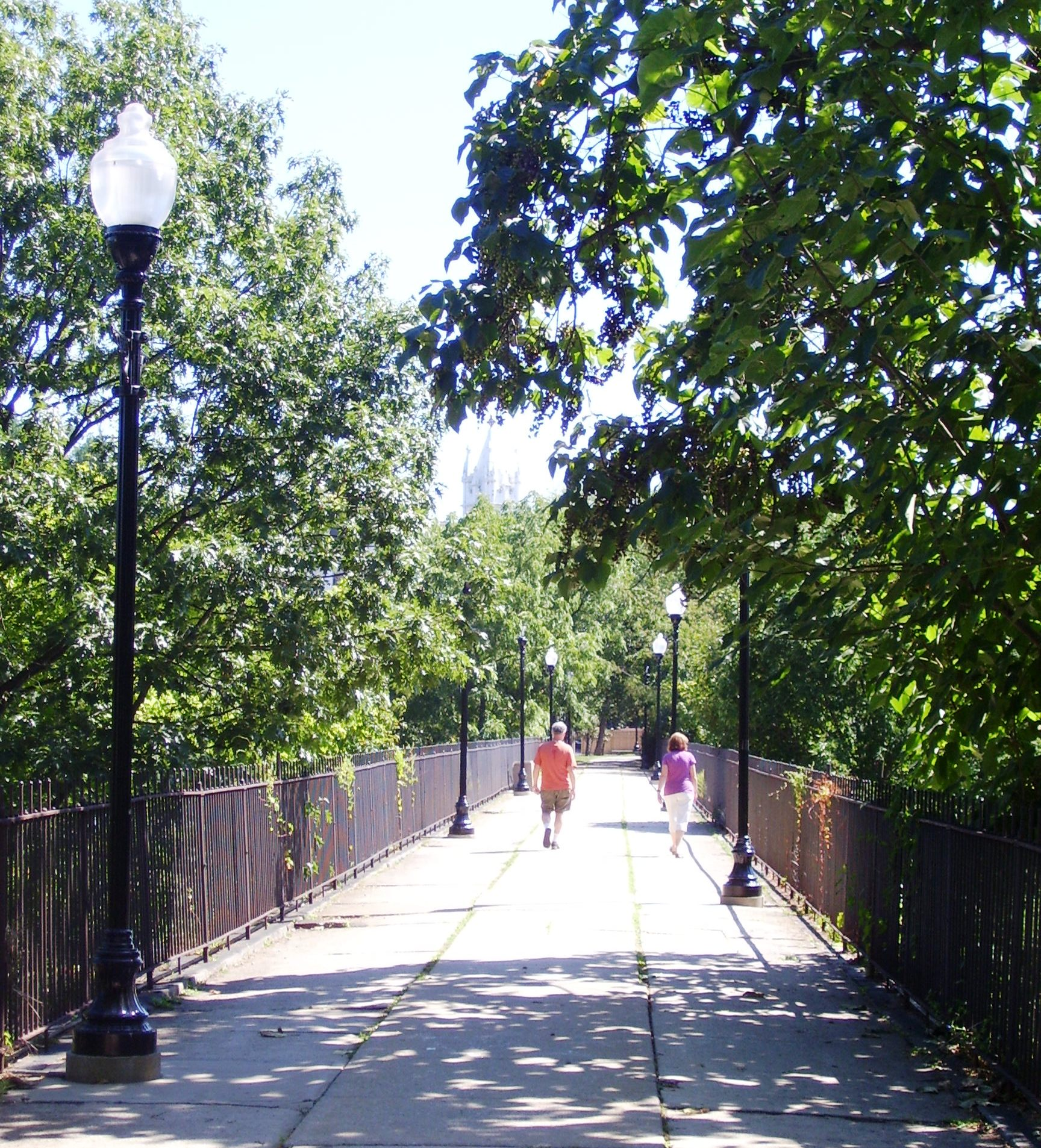
The upper bridge is today used as a pedestrian bridge, and is part of the state Old Croton Aqueduct Trail
