= Scarborough Historic District =

Historic district in New York, United States

- U.S. National Register of Historic Places
- U.S. Historic district
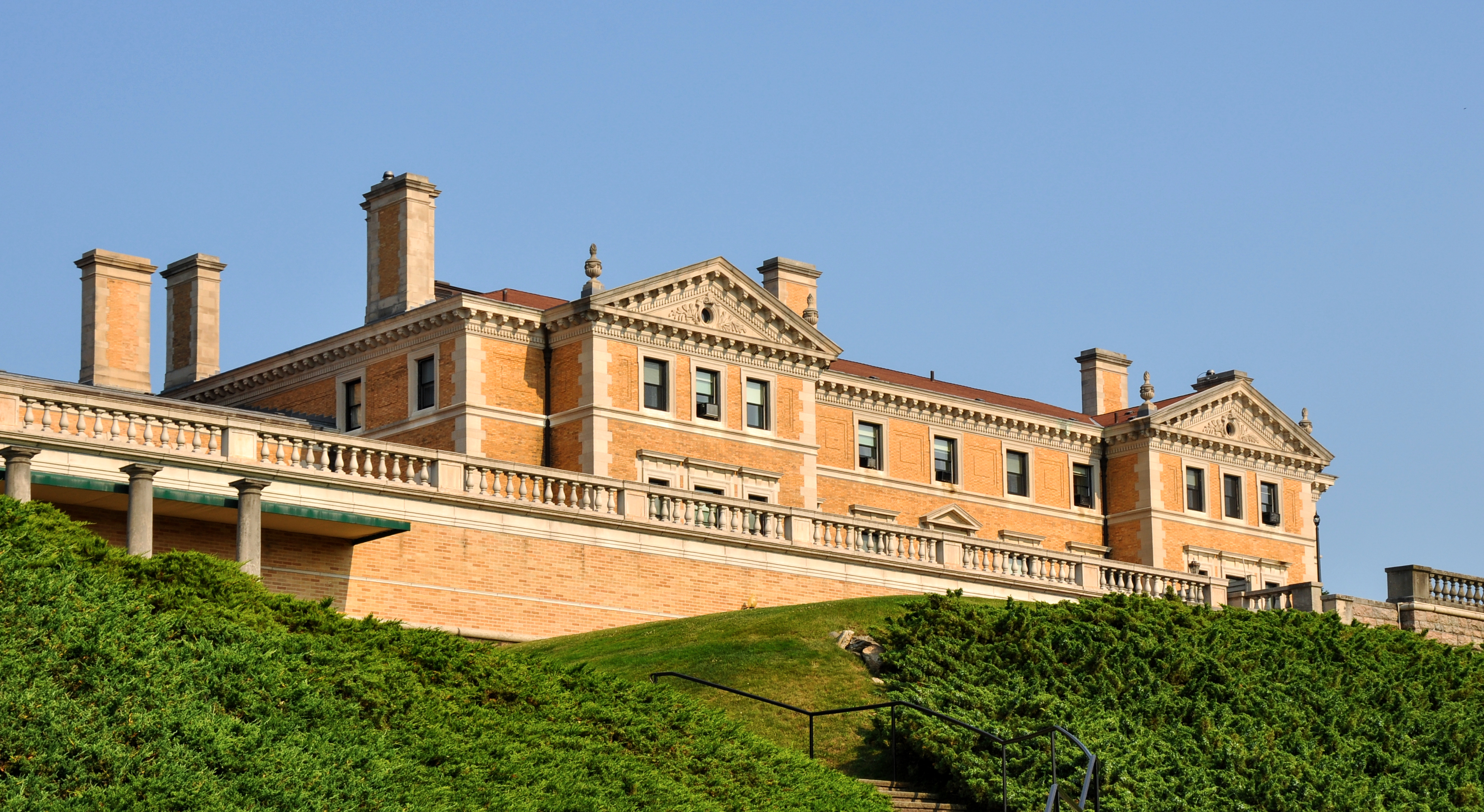
- Woodlea at Sleepy Hollow Country Club

- Location within New York

- Map of the Scarborough Historic District
- Location: U.S. Route 9, Briarcliff Manor, New York
- Coordinates: 41°7′45″N 73°51′22″W
- Area: 376 acres (152 ha)
- Built: 1770
- Architects: Multiple; McKim, Mead & White
- Architectural style: Mid-19th Century Revival, Late Victorian
- NRHP reference No.: 84003433
- Added to NRHP: September 7, 1984

The Scarborough Historic District is a national historic district located in the suburban community of Scarborough-on-Hudson, in Briarcliff Manor, New York. The 376-acre (152 ha) district was added to the National Register of Historic Places in 1984, and contains seven historically and architecturally significant properties dating from the late 18th century to the early 20th century. Most of the properties are domestic, or used for education or religion. The most common architectural styles within the district are Mid-19th Century Revival and Late Victorian.

== Profile ==
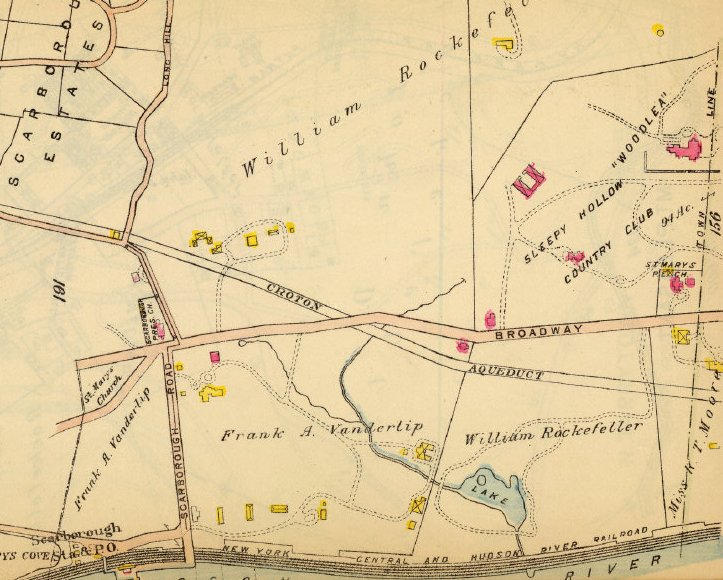
1914 map of all district properties or their present locations except Sparta Cemetery

The 376-acre (152 ha) district contains 26 contributing buildings, two contributing sites, and one contributing structure. They are associated with three estates: Beechwood, Rosemont, and Woodlea (now Sleepy Hollow Country Club); The Clear View School, a school complex; two religious properties: Saint Mary's Episcopal Church and Scarborough Presbyterian Church; and Sparta Cemetery, which dates back to before the Revolutionary War. All properties stand in much the same condition as when first nominated, except Rosemont, which was demolished in the mid- to late-1980s.

Several properties within the district exemplify Mid-19th Century Revival architectures, including Greek, Gothic, Renaissance, and Neoclassical styles; their formal landscaping exemplifies estate landscaping at the turn of the 19th century. Most of the properties were established by wealthy landowners, ranging from the late 18th century to the early 20th century. The district, which remains generally rural and sparsely developed, borders the Hudson River and lies within the towns of Ossining and Mount Pleasant, between the villages of Ossining and Sleepy Hollow.

Most of the district's buildings are set on large parcels of land, and many are clearly visible from U.S. Route 9 (the former Albany Post Road), the district's major thoroughfare. Stone and brick walls line Route 9 within the boundaries of the district. The district achieved State Register status on August 6, 1984, National Register district status on September 7, 1984, and local landmark status on January 5, 1988.

== Beechwood ==
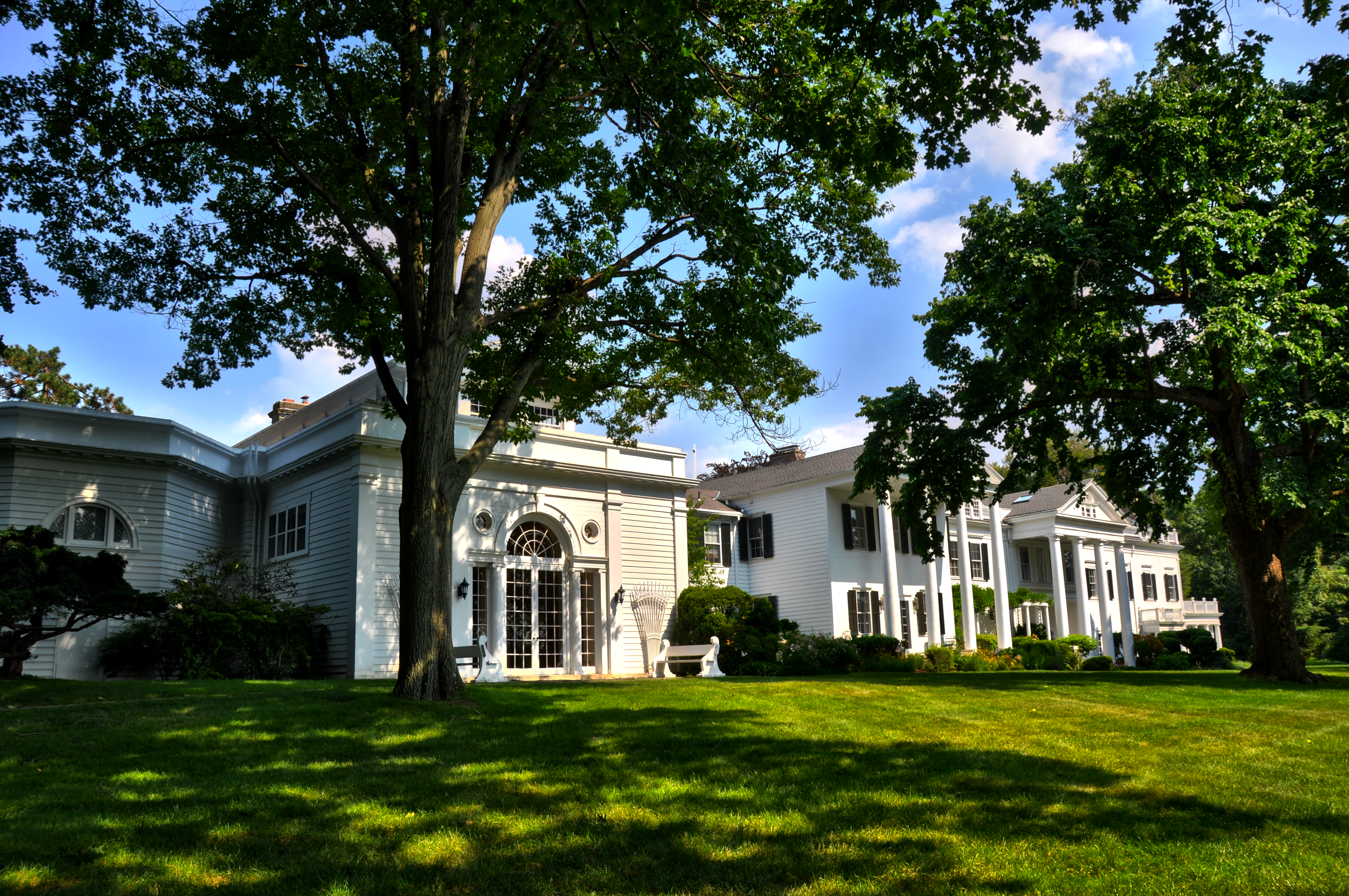
Beechwood

Beechwood is an estate built in 1780; it was most notably the home of National City Bank president Frank A. Vanderlip and his family. The mansion has gone through a number of expansions and renovations; the most recent involved dividing the mansion into three segments for use as condominiums. Beechwood was a filming location of the 1970 film House of Dark Shadows, and a filming location and the primary setting of Savages, a 1972 Merchant Ivory film.

In the 1890s, Henry Walter Webb substantially added to the estate from numerous properties, including an earlier estate named Beechwood. Webb also renovated and expanded the mansion, hiring R. H. Robertson to double the size of the house. Robertson designed the expansion in the Colonial Revival style, to be compatible with the neoclassical Federal style of the original but more ornate.

== The Clear View School ==
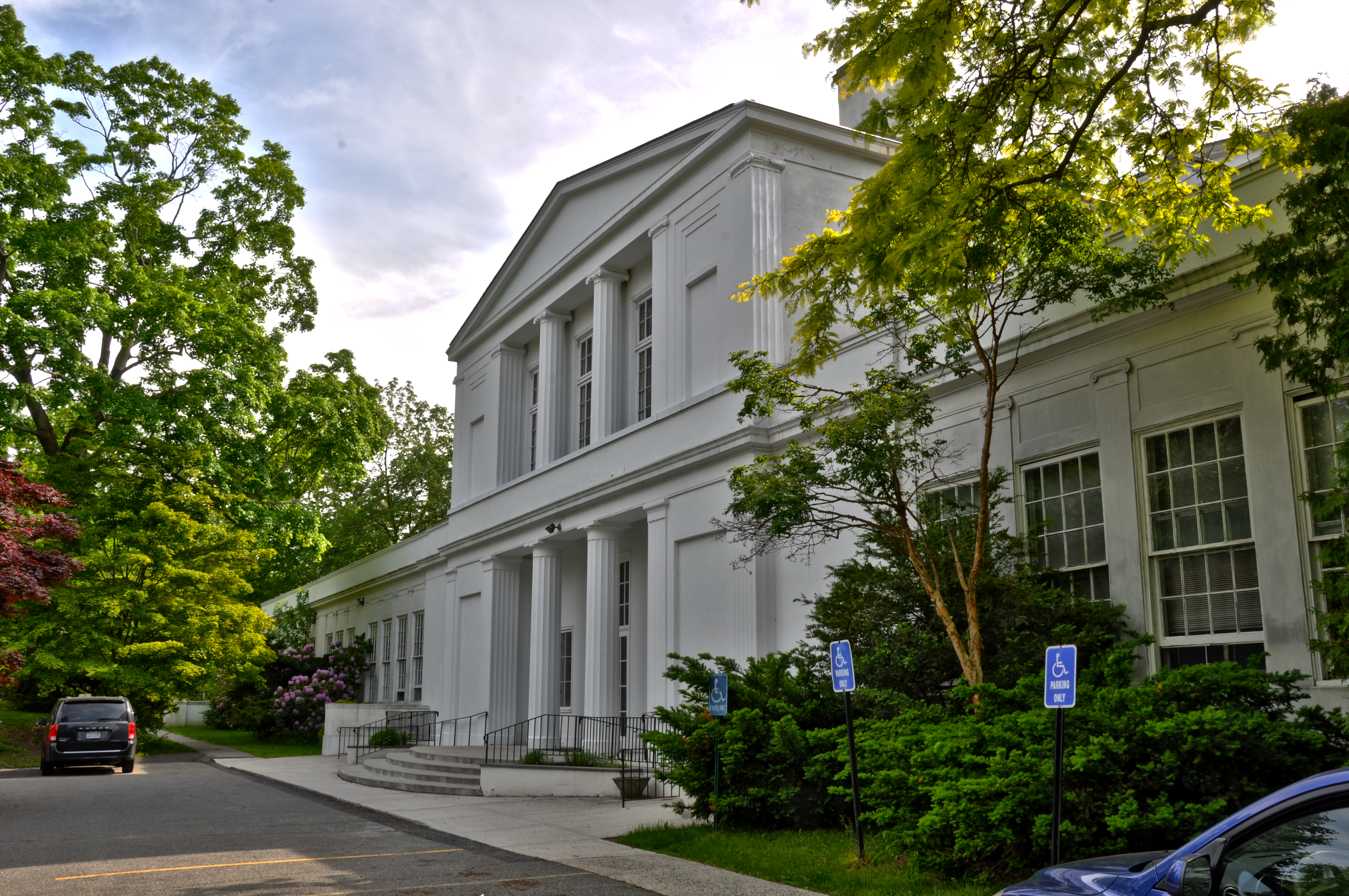
Vanderlip Hall of The Clear View School

The Clear View School was built in 1917 by Frank Vanderlip on his Beechwood property as the Scarborough School, the first Montessori school in the United States. In 1978, the school closed; The Clear View School purchased the property in 1980 and opened in 1981. It runs a day treatment program for 83 students with mental disorders.

== Rosemont ==
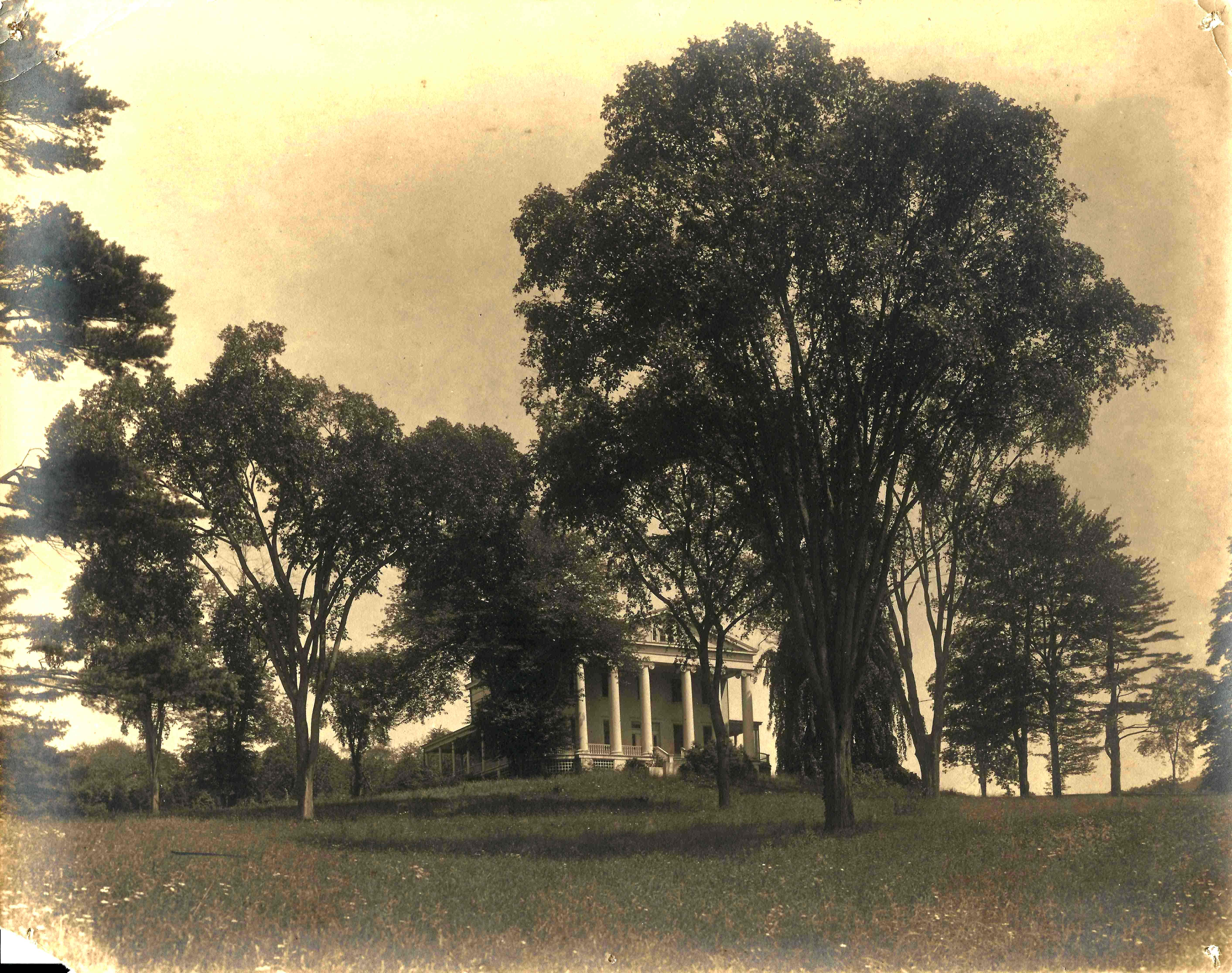
Rosemont

Rosemont, also known by the names Scarborough House and Hillside, was a Greek Revival mansion built around 1840. The house was near the birthplace of Rear Admiral John Lorimer Worden (1818-1897). It became headquarters to Stein and Day in 1973, and was known at that time as Scarborough House. The house was demolished in February 1990. The area was developed in the late 1990s with five up-scale homes on a cul-de-sac called Admiral Wordens Lane

The mansion was used by Frank Vanderlip as a dormitory for Scarborough School boarding students. Rosemont stood opposite Vanderlip's Beechwood, at the corner of Route 9 and Scarborough Road.

== Saint Mary's Episcopal Church ==
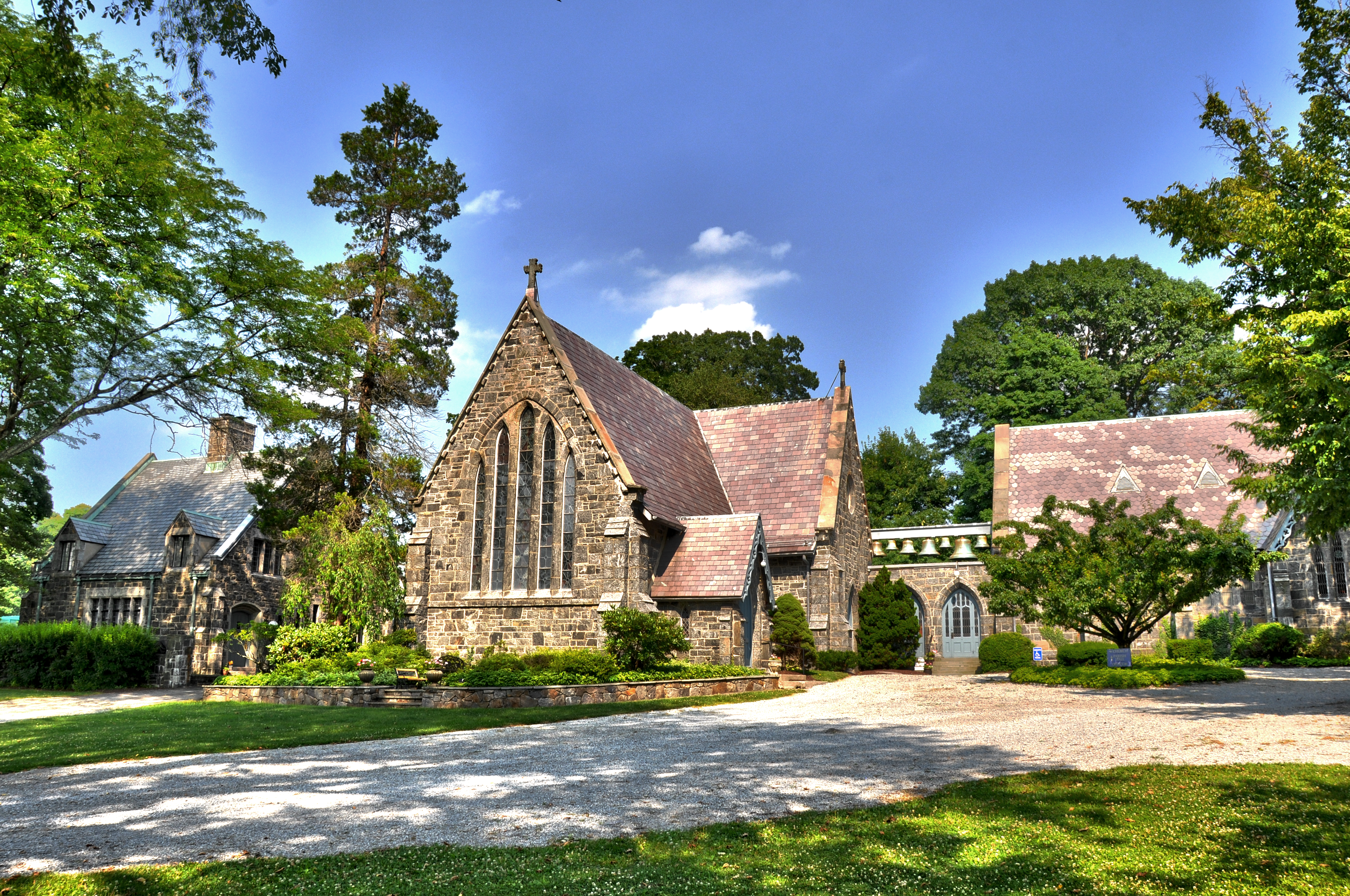
Saint Mary's Episcopal Church

Saint Mary's Episcopal Church, founded in 1839 by William Creighton and incorporated in 1883 as Saint Mary's Church, Beechwood, is Briarcliff Manor's oldest church; it was reincorporated in 1945 as Saint Mary's Church of Scarborough. Its first service was in 1839 in a small schoolhouse on an acre of Creighton's Beechwood property, at the corner of Albany Post and Sleepy Hollow Roads. The service was led by Creighton's son-in-law Reverend Edward Nathaniel Meade.

The granite church was built in 1850 by local stonemasons and paid for primarily by Creighton and Meade, but also by Creighton's wealthy neighbors, including US Navy Commodore Matthew C. Perry, James Watson Webb, William Aspinwall, and Ambrose Kingsland. The first services there were held on September 21, 1851. The church is in near-original condition, with a design based on the 14th-century Gothic St. Mary's parish church in Scarborough, England and is the only church with a complete set of John Bolton (brother of William Jay Bolton) stained-glass windows.

The church's rectory was built in 1931 as a memorial to its first two rectors Creighton and Meade. Notable parishioners included Commodore Matthew Perry, Viola Allen, and Washington Irving. Irving, the author of "Rip Van Winkle" and "The Legend of Sleepy Hollow", brought and planted the ivy surrounding the church. He had received it from Walter Scott, from Abbotsford. The ivy of the parish house was brought from the Argonne battlefield, after World War I, by Narcissa Vanderlip. The 200-acre-plus (81 ha) Sleepy Hollow Country Club surrounds the church grounds on three sides.

During World War I, the New York Guard's First Provisional Regiment was stationed at the former Holbrook Military Academy, guarding the Croton Aqueduct. The regiment held a service at Saint Mary's in 1918, as described in a contemporary regimental history:

On Sept. 29th, Supply Company trucks, sector cars, and auxiliary motor service brought from every unit of the regiment on the east side of the Hudson River details to the stated regimental service held at St. Mary's Church, Scarborough, as a tribute from the men of the regiment to Captain Baldwin.

It was a beautiful bright Sunday morning and the men of the various companies, clad in their Sunday best, made a splendid appearance. As each company arrived, it was formed along the side of the Albany Post Road facing the church, and at 11 o'clock, while the church bells rang a final call to worship, Sergt. Bugler Corrie and the headquarters field-music sounded church call. This was immediately followed by assembly, and then, headed by the field-music, the staff, non-commissioned staff, Headquarters Company, Supply Company and the company details of the two battalions marched up through the church grounds to the church itself. At the entrance the field-music swung out of line and played the remainder of the column into the church, where the organist took up the processional.

With the entire church filled with soldiers, it was impossible to seat the civilian congregation and all of the detachments of the National League for Women's Service, the Motor Corps' of America and the Red Cross Motor Corps who marched in the column. Many found seats in the cloister, and others sat on chairs outside the doors of the church.

— T. R. Hutton, page 295

On July 5, 2015, Saint Mary's Episcopal Church closed after 175 years in operation.

William Rockefeller, who lived nearby at Rockwood Hall, was a regular attendee of the church in the last few years of his life.

== Scarborough Presbyterian Church ==
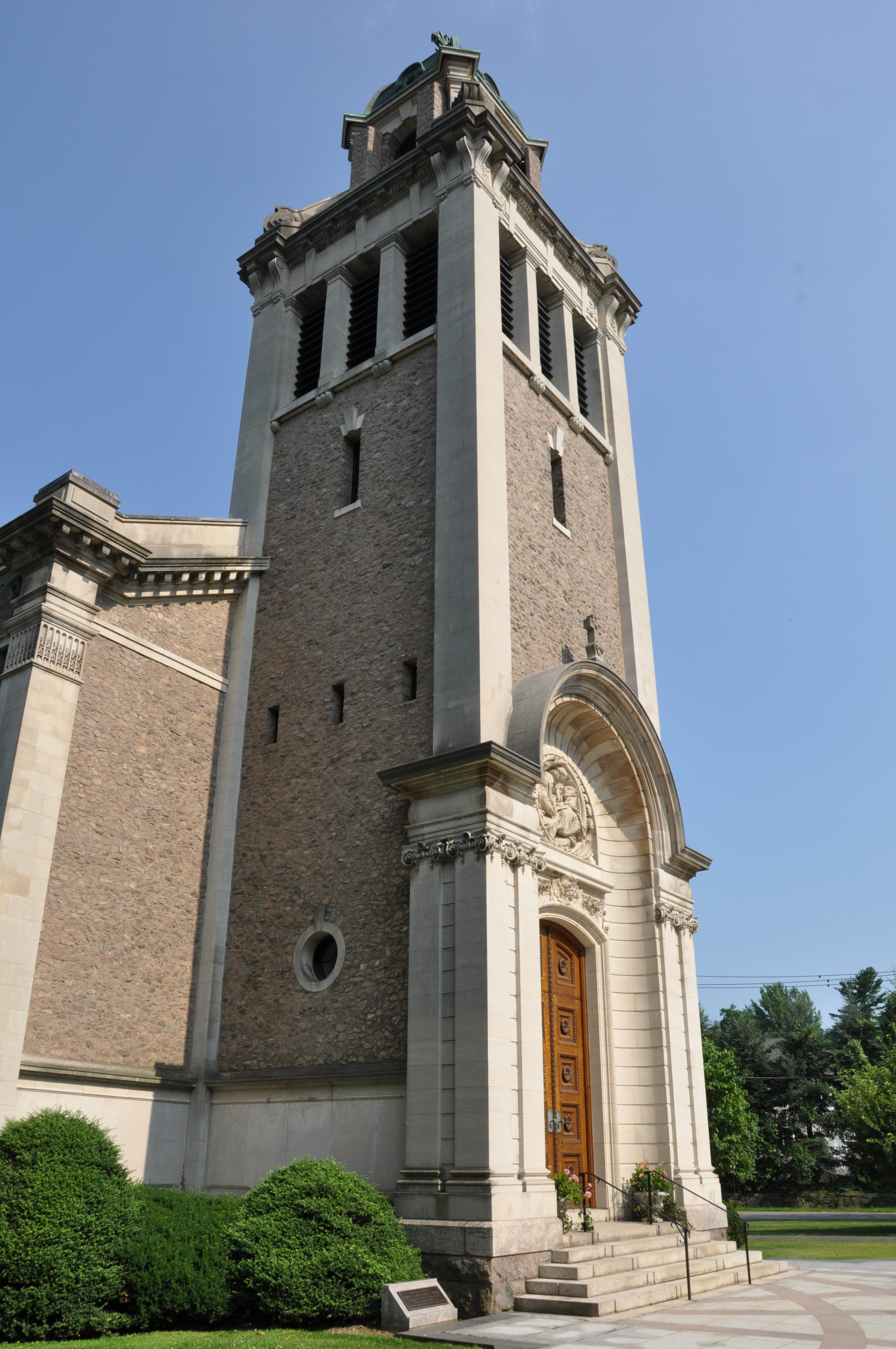
Scarborough Presbyterian Church

Scarborough Presbyterian Church is the third-oldest in Briarcliff Manor., and has a 2.75-acre (1.11 ha) property. The church has its origins with Elliott Fitch Shepard and his wife Margaret Louisa Vanderbilt Shepard purchasing a roadhouse on the Albany Post Road. In 1892, after enlarging and remodeling the store, adding diamond-paned windows and replacing the floors and porches, the building was first used as a church. The church's organization meeting was held with nineteen charter members.

After Elliott Fitch Shepard's death in March 1893, Margaret donated the present church building and manse. The Spanish Renaissance-style church was designed by Augustus Haydel (a nephew of Stanford White) and August D. Shepard (a nephew of Elliott Shepard and of William Rutherford Mead). The two nephews later designed the 1899 Fabbri Mansion in Manhattan. The church's cornerstone was laid on October 13, 1893. During construction of the building's foundation, workers found quicksand, though Shepard was intent on constructing the church there and had the construction workers dig 30 feet into the ground to find firm ground for the foundation. European workers were brought to the site to aide in the building's construction. The Italian Renaissance Revival building was of limestone delivered from Indiana by railroad, requiring a special track laid at Scarborough to accommodate the delivery. The completed church was dedicated on May 11, 1895, in memory of Elliott Fitch Shepard. It was briefly known as Shepard Memorial Church. The dedication was attended by Cornelius Vanderbilt II, Frederick W. Vanderbilt, Chauncey Depew, William Sloane of W. & J. Sloane, William Seward Webb, H. Walter Webb, and James A. Burden Jr.

It was built of pink granite rubble with limestone trim, with a steeple supported by flying buttresses. The interior has mosaic tile floors, fluted pilasters with gilded capitals, a coffered ceiling made of redwood, and stained-glass windows. The church's 1,498-pipe organ was constructed around 1894; it was the first all-electric action organ in the world. The 3-acre (1.2 ha) church property also contains the church's carriage house, used for offices, and the parish house, designed by Augustus D. Shepard and completed in 1908.

From 1929 to 1974, the Scarborough Engine Company of the Briarcliff Manor Fire Department had its first firehouse in the church's garage building or barn, which is older than the church building itself.

Since around 1995, the church has run the Scarborough Presbyterian Children's Center, a non-denominational preschool housed in a building next door to the church, with an outdoor playground nearby. The preschool serves families in Briarcliff Manor and Scarborough, Ossining, Tarrytown, Sleepy Hollow, Pocantico Hills, and Pleasantville.

In 1995, some of the church was renovated; in 2002, the building was more fully renovated due to years of floodwater and runoff damage, including floods from Hurricane Floyd.

== Sleepy Hollow Country Club ==
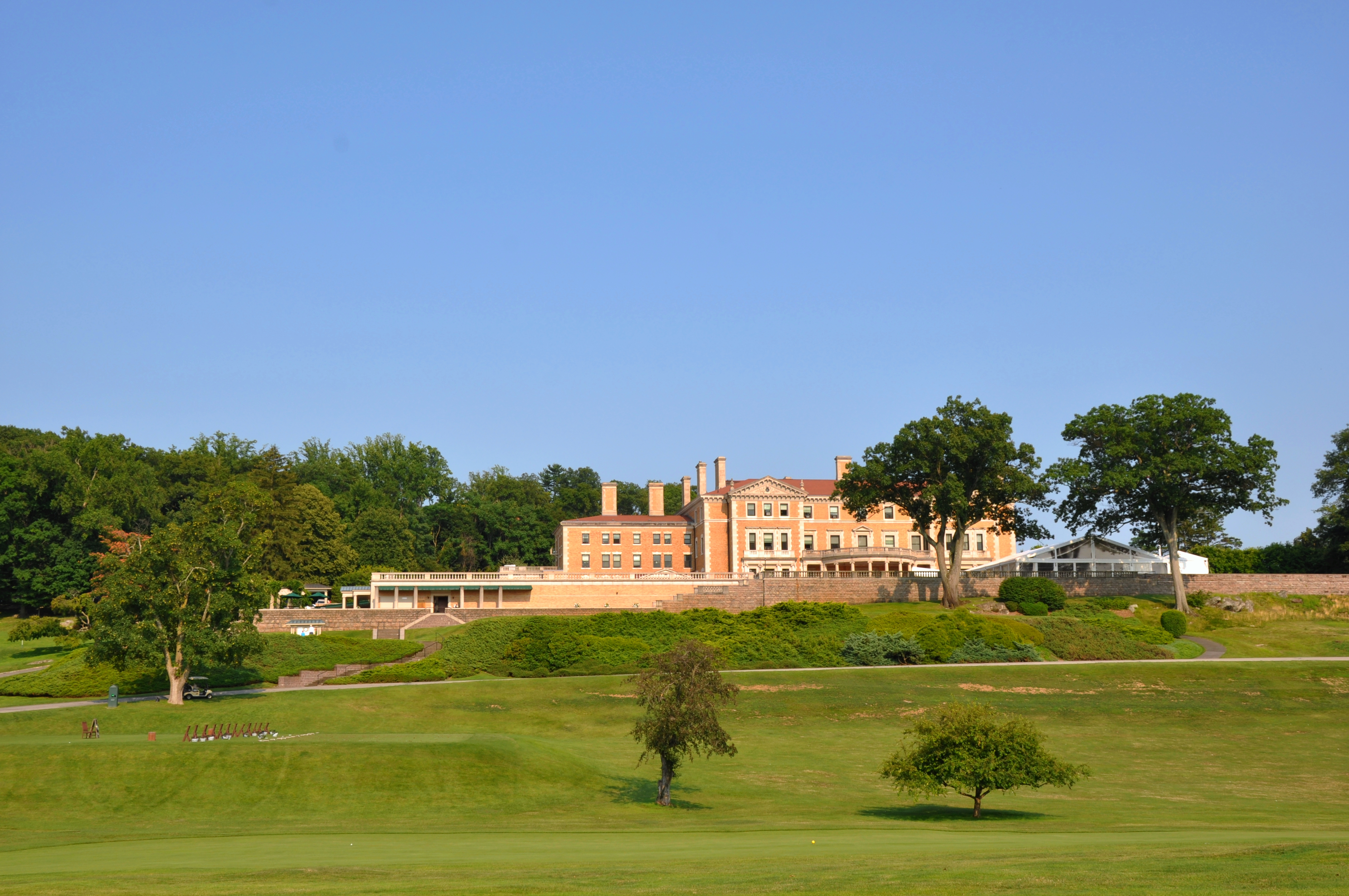
Woodlea, clubhouse of Sleepy Hollow Country Club

Sleepy Hollow Country Club was founded in 1911. The main building of Sleepy Hollow Country Club was known as Woodlea, the 140-room $2 million ($71.7 million in 2025) mansion built in 1895 for Elliott Fitch Shepard and his family. The building, with Beaux-Arts and Georgian Revival features, was designed by McKim, Mead & White and built from 1892 to 1895. In 1910, Margaret Louisa Vanderbilt Shepard sold the estate to Frank A. Vanderlip and William Rockefeller, who converted it into a country club. Current members include Bill Murray, James Patterson, and several members of the Rockefeller family.

== Sparta Cemetery ==
Sparta Cemetery, or the Presbyterian Burying Ground at Sparta, is a two-acre (0.81 ha) burying ground dating to 1764, making it the oldest cemetery in Westchester County. It is the only contributing property outside Briarcliff Manor; the Ossining Historical Society has maintained the cemetery since 1984. Until 2012, the cemetery was owned by the First Presbyterian Church of Ossining; its original church building, constructed circa 1768, was relocated to the center of Ossining in 1800. In 2012, ownership of the cemetery was transferred to the Town of Ossining, though it has retained its historic identity as the "Presbyterian Burying Ground." The grounds hold 34 known Revolutionary War veterans. Many of the area's earliest residents are buried in the cemetery. The oldest person interred in the cemetery, aged 108, was Captain Lewis Brady; his home in Ossining's Sparta neighborhood is part of African American Heritage Trail of Westchester County.

In September 1780, the British warship HMS Vulture fired a cannonball into the gravestone of Abraham Ladew, Jr., who had died in 1774, at the age of 7 years. The Vulture was traveling south from Croton Point to pick up Major John André, a rendezvous that never occurred; André was captured in Tarrytown on his way to the vessel. One of the American soldiers who fired at HMS Vulture during the Teller Point engagement of September 21, 1780, Moses Sherwood, is buried in Sparta Cemetery.

=== Gallery ===
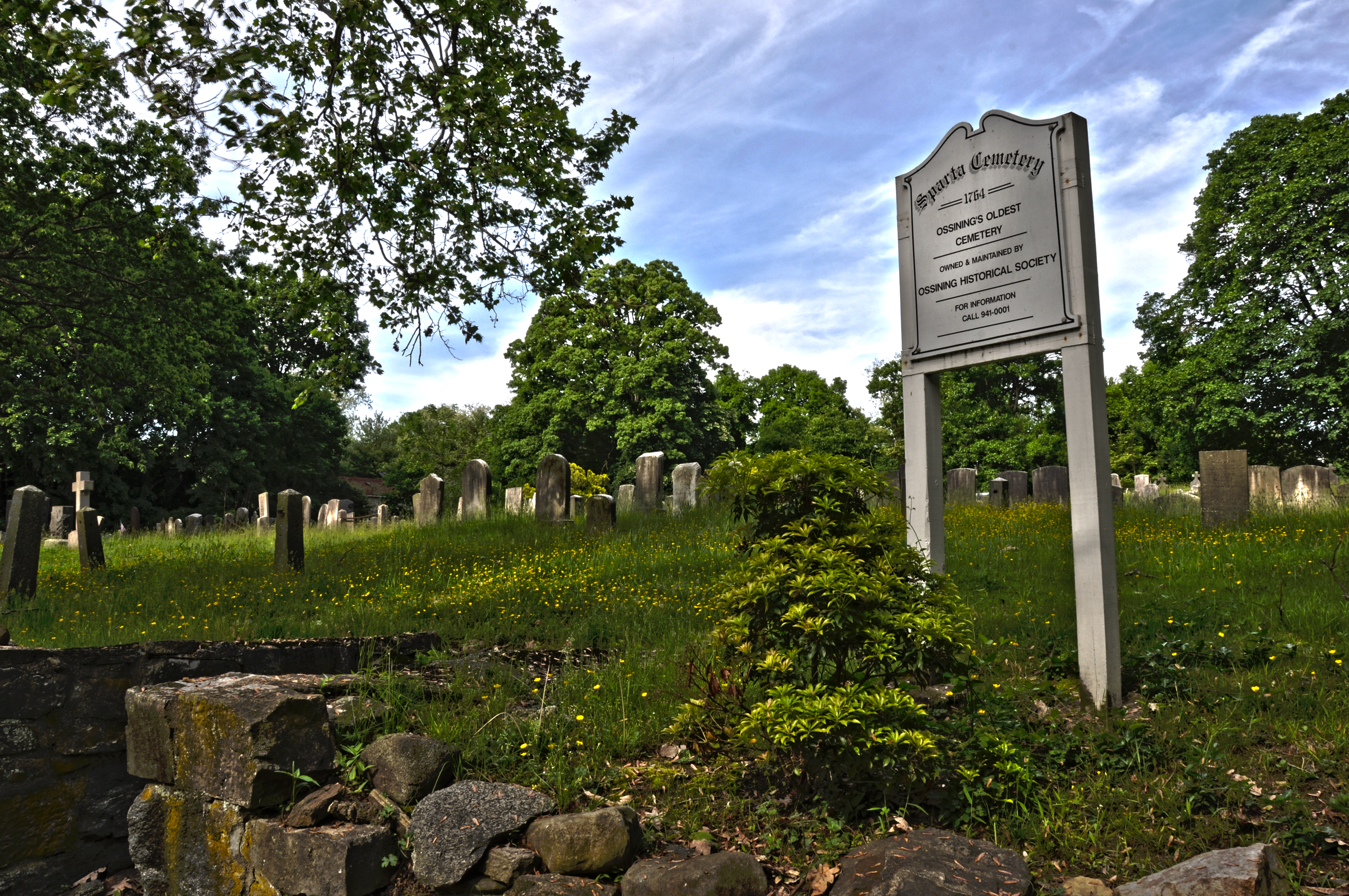
Entrance from Revolutionary Rd.

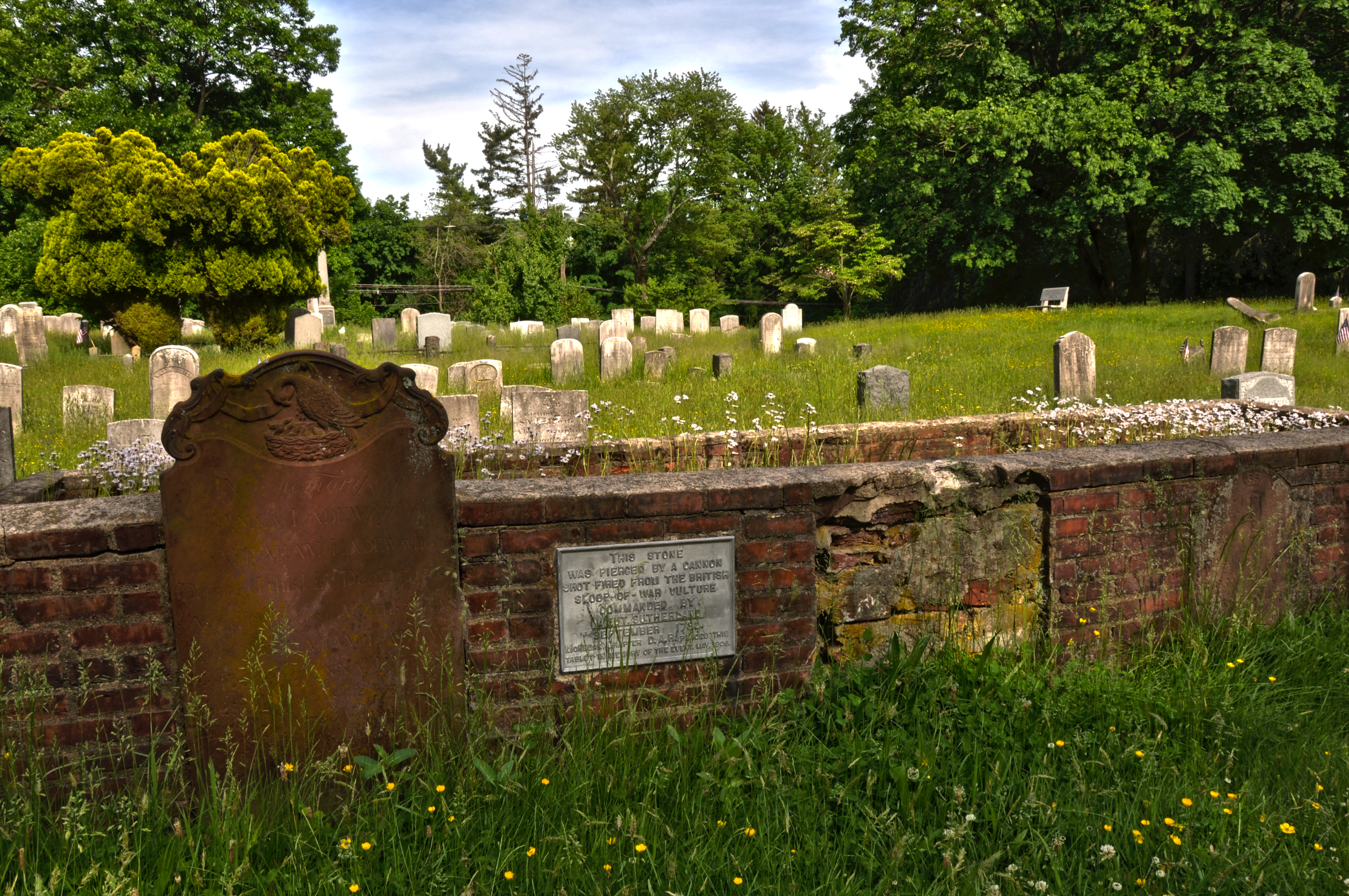
The Ladew family plot, with a commemorative plaque describing the 1780 event

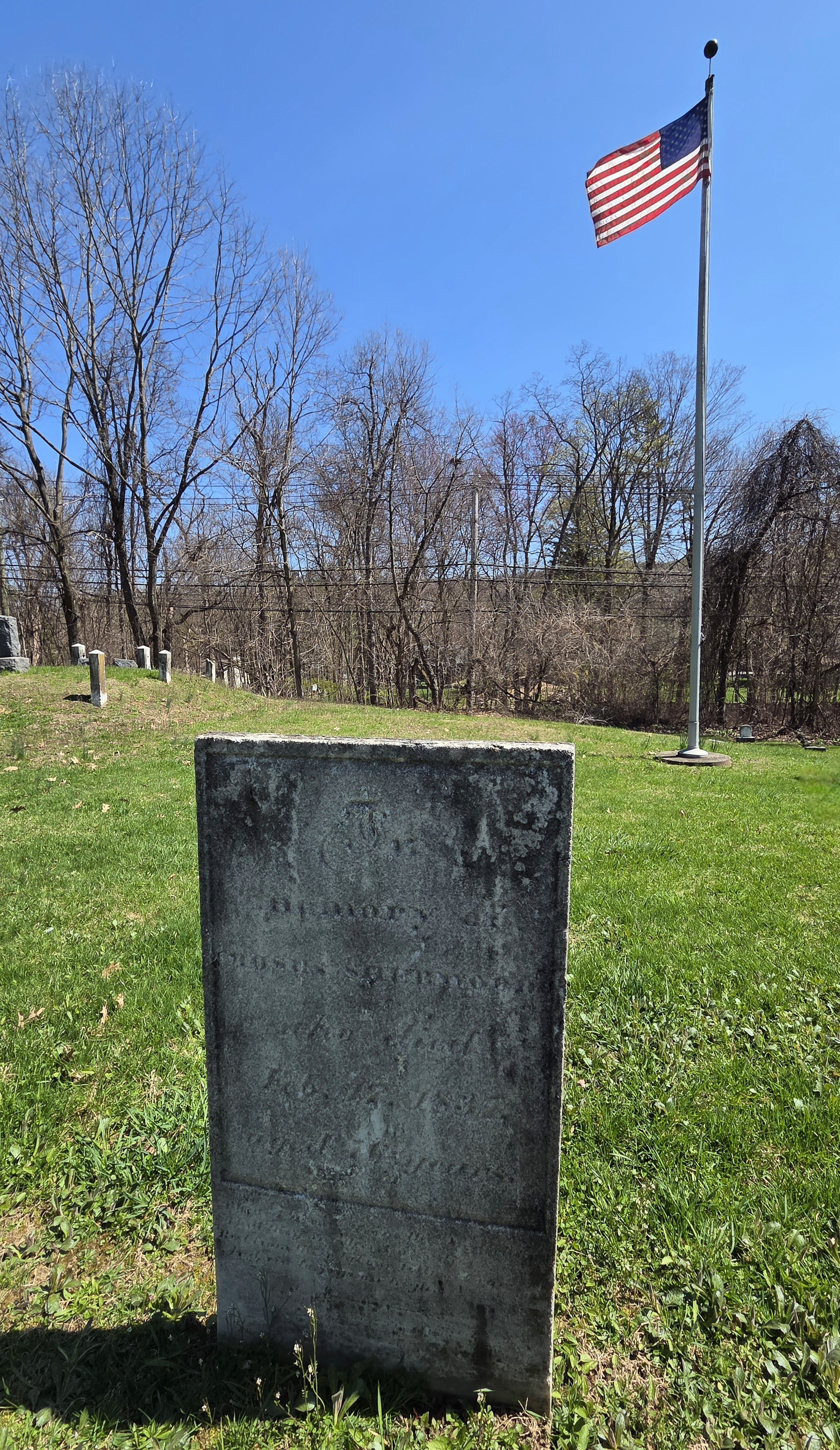
Grave of Moses Sherwood

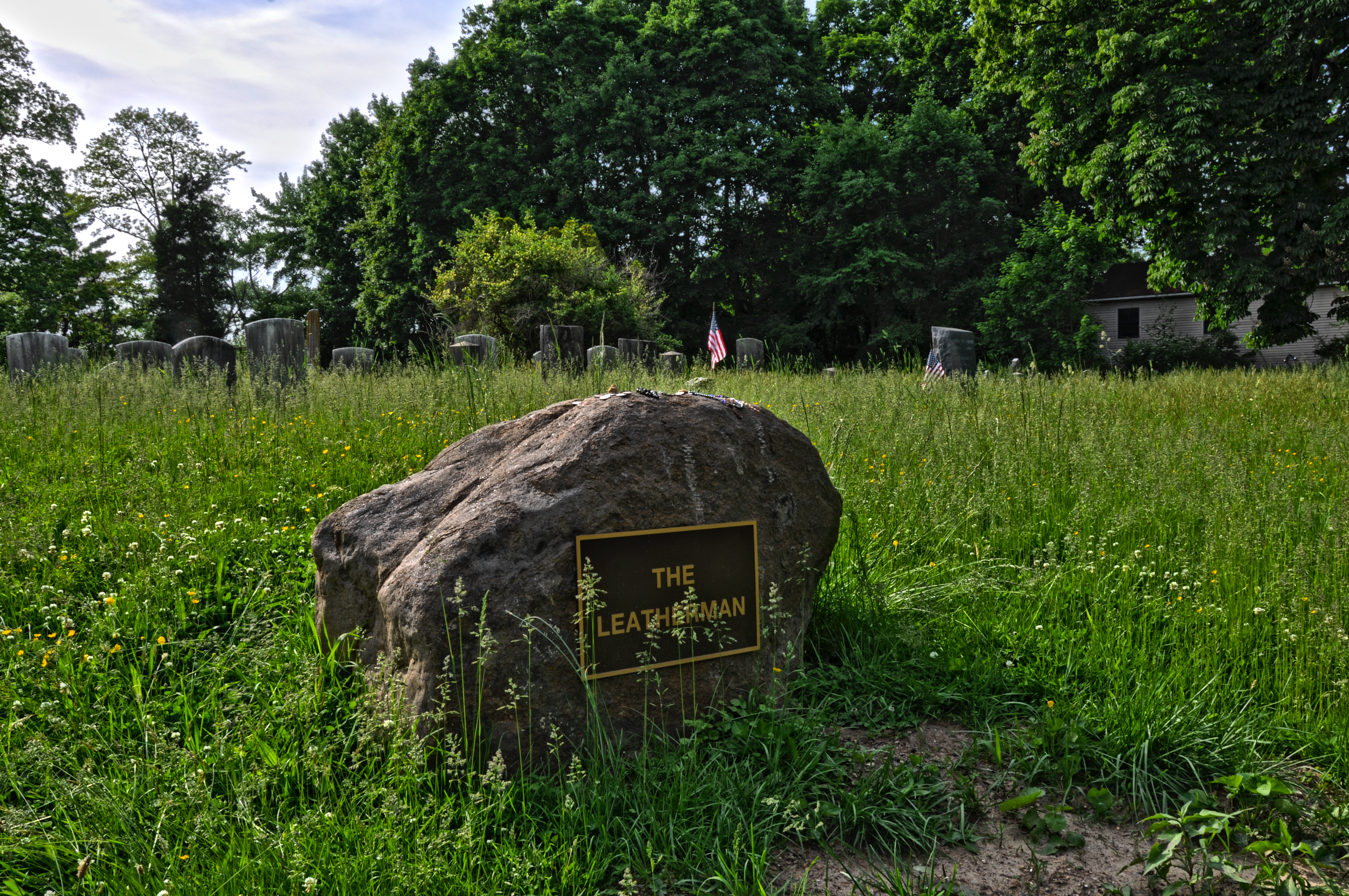
Gravestone of the Leatherman

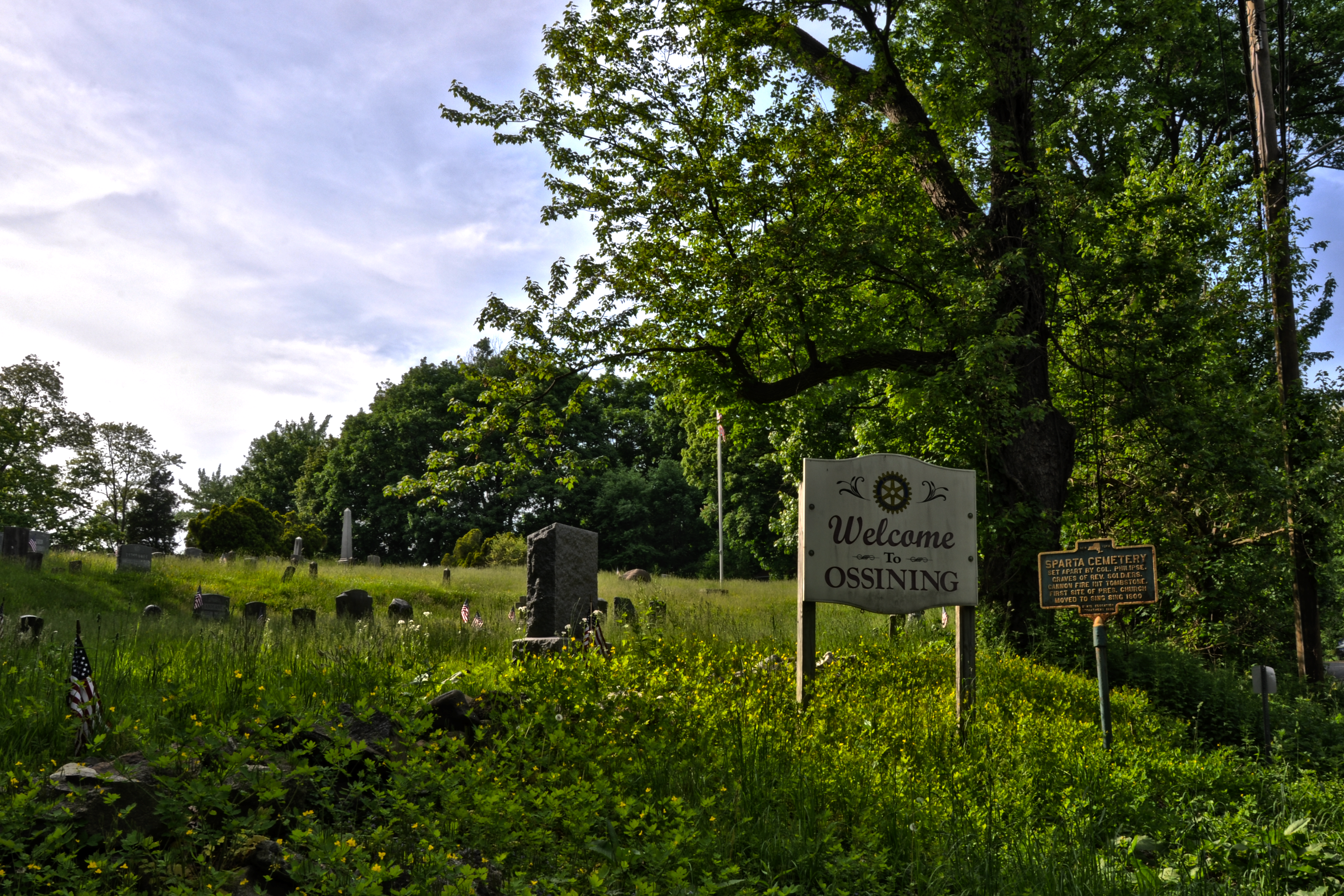
Entrance from US Route 9

== See also ==
- History of Briarcliff Manor
- National Register of Historic Places listings in northern Westchester County, New York
