= Baron Trump novels =

1889–1893 children's novels by Ingersoll Lockwood

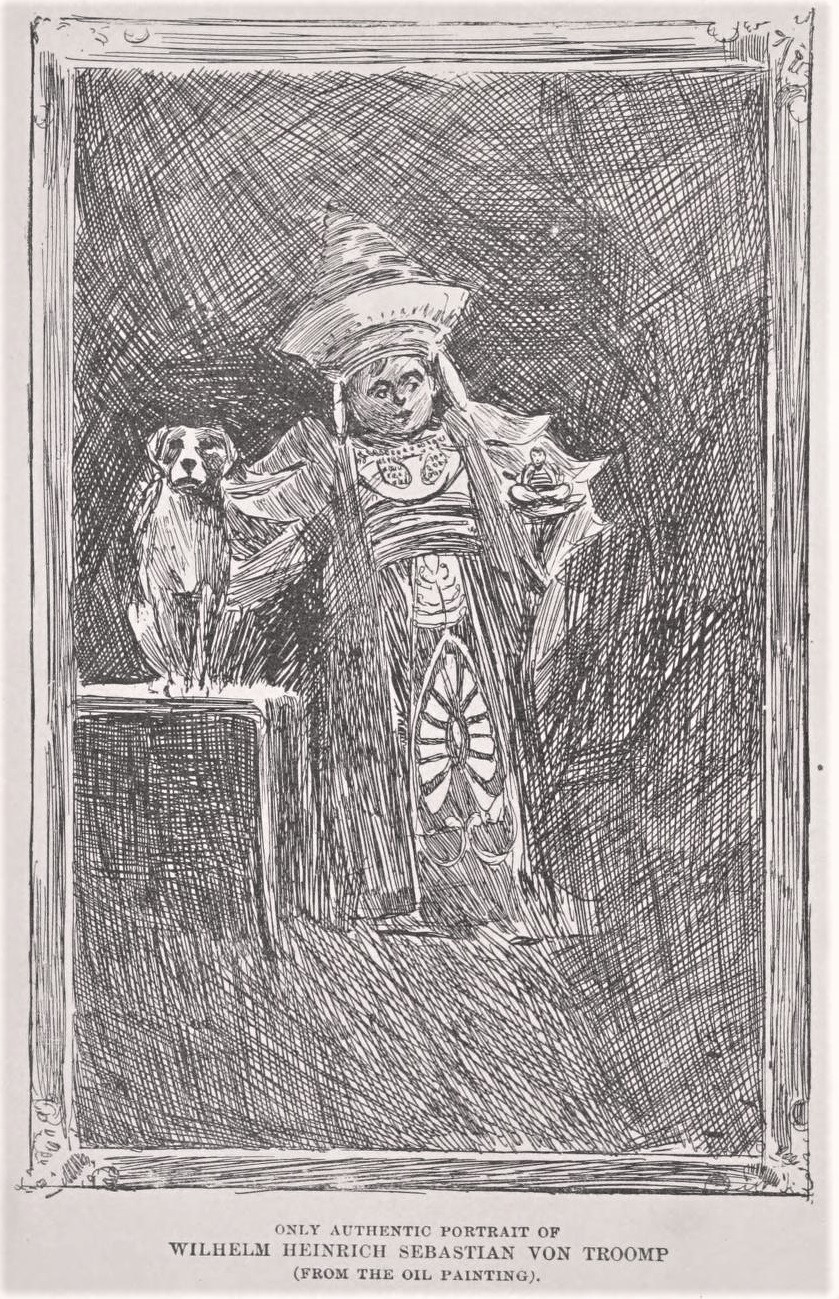
Frontispiece from Baron Trump's Marvellous Underground Journey. The caption reads: "Only Authentic Portrait of Wilhelm Heinrich Sebastian Von Troomp (From the Oil Painting)"

The Baron Trump novels are two children's novels written in 1889 and 1893 by American author and lawyer Ingersoll Lockwood. They remained obscure until 2017 when they received media attention for perceived similarities between their protagonist and U.S. President Donald Trump.

== 19th century publication and reception ==
Lockwood published the first novel, Travels and Adventures of Little Baron Trump and his wonderful dog Bulger, in 1889, and its sequel, Baron Trump's Marvellous Underground Journey, in 1893. The novels recount the adventures of the German boy Wilhelm Heinrich Sebastian Von Troomp, who goes by "Baron Trump", as he discovers weird underground civilizations, offends the natives, flees from his entanglements with local women, and repeats this pattern until arriving back home at Castle Trump.

The novels were part of a trend in U.S. children's literature that responded to the demand for fantastic adventure stories triggered by Lewis Carroll's Alice's Adventures in Wonderland published in 1865. They were, however, indifferently received and did not enter the canon of children's literature. An 1891 reviewer wrote about one of Lockwood's novels: "The author labors through three hundred pages of fantastic and grotesque narrative, now and then striking a spark of wit; but the sparks emit little light and no warmth, and one has to fumble for the story."

== Rediscovery in 2017 ==
In July 2017, the books were rediscovered by Internet forum users, and then by the media, who pointed out similarities between the protagonist and U.S. President Donald Trump.

Jaime Fuller wrote in Politico that Baron Trump is "precocious, restless, and prone to get in trouble." He often mentions his massive brain and has a personalized insult for most people he meets. Fuller also notes that Baron Trump lives in a building named after himself, "Castle Trump"; while the real-life Donald Trump had lived in Trump Tower for decades. Furthermore, Donald Trump's youngest son's name is Barron Trump, and Donald Trump used the pseudonym "John Barron" in the 1980s. Chris Riotta noted in Newsweek that Baron Trump's adventures begin in Russia. Riotta also mentioned another book of Lockwood's, 1900; or, The Last President, in which New York City is riven by protests following the shocking victory in the 1896 presidential election of a populist candidate who brings on the downfall of the American republic.
